= List of people from Alabama =

State flag of Alabama

Location of Alabama in the United States

This is a listing of notable people born in, or notable for their association with the U.S. state of Alabama.

== A ==
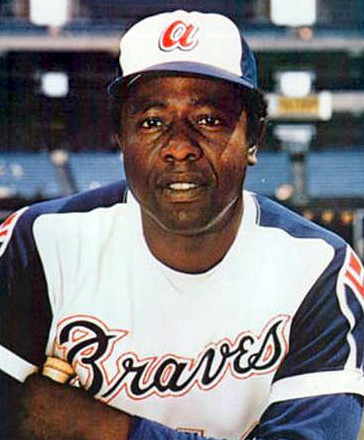
Hank Aaron

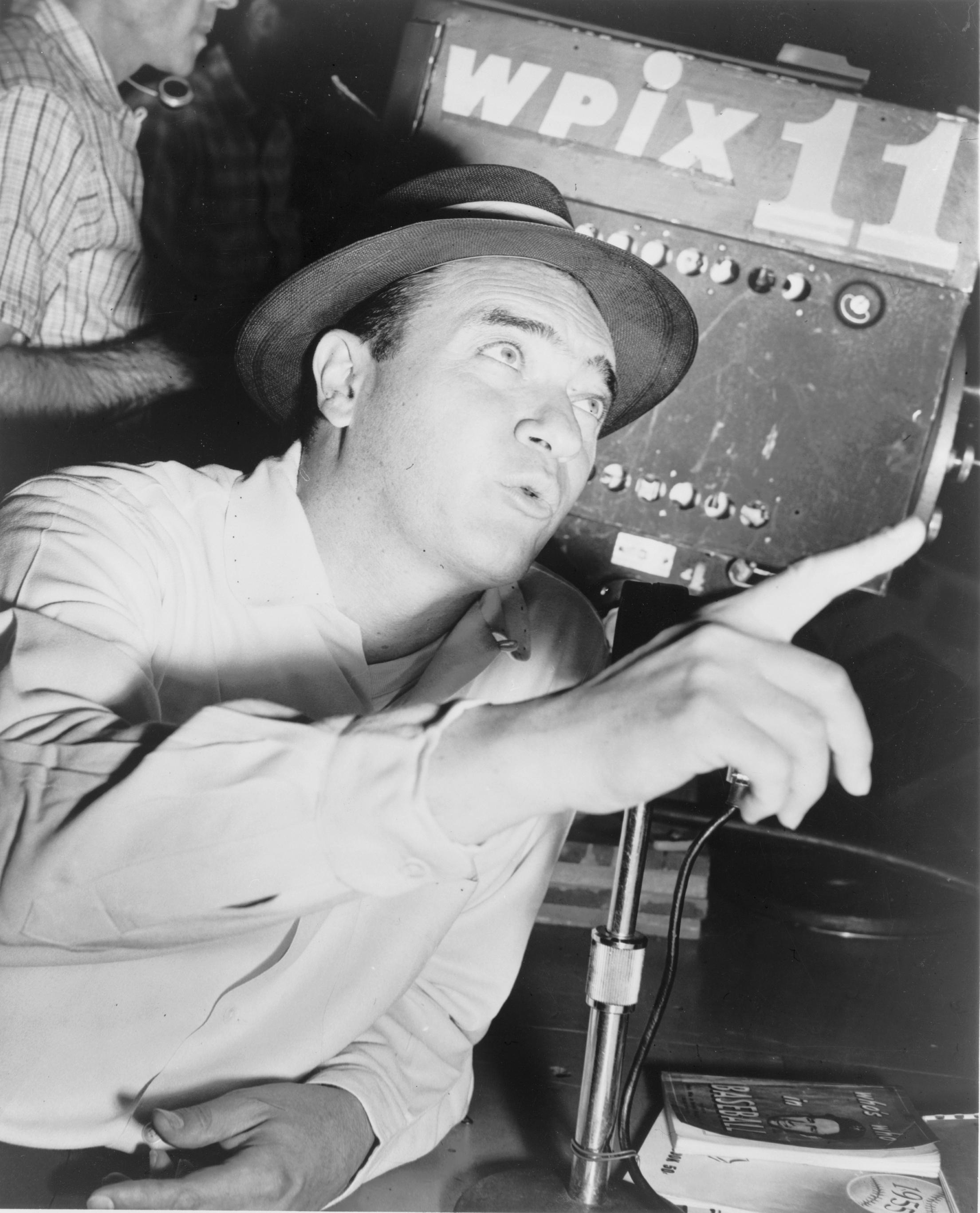
Mel Allen

- Hank Aaron, Hall of Fame Major League Baseball player (Mobile)
- Ralph Abernathy, civil rights leader, Baptist minister (Linden)
- Act of Congress, musical group
- Austin Adams, MLB pitcher, Cleveland Indians (Montgomery)
- Mario Addison, NFL player, Carolina Panthers (Birmingham)
- Robert Aderholt, representative from Alabama's 4th congressional district since 1997 (Haleyville)
- Tommie Agee, MLB player (Magnolia)
- Tommie Agee, former NFL player, Dallas Cowboys (Maplesville)
- Daniel Alarcón, novelist (Birmingham)
- David Donald Albritton, Olympic medalist and politician (Danville)
- Doyle Alexander, MLB player (Cordova)
- Chalmers Alford, musician (Huntsville)
- James B. Allen, U.S. senator (1969–1978) (Gadsden)
- Jason Allen, NFL player (Muscle Shoals)
- Jonathan Allen, NFL player, Washington Commanders (Anniston)
- Maryon Pittman Allen, U.S. senator (1978) (Gadsden and Birmingham)
- Mel Allen, sportscaster, Alabama football and New York Yankees (Birmingham)
- Viola Allen, stage actress (Huntsville)
- Bobby Allison, NASCAR driver (Hueytown)
- Davey Allison, NASCAR driver (Hueytown)
- David Allison, professor at University of Alabama at Birmingham (Birmingham)
- Donnie Allison, NASCAR driver (Hueytown)
- John Amari, circuit judge and former member of both houses of the Alabama legislature (Trussville)
- Mary Anderson, actress (Birmingham)
- Ray Anderson, boxer (Anniston)
- Glenn Andrews, U.S. representative (1965–1967) (Anniston)
- Ivy Andrews, MLB player (Dora)
- Sheila Andrews, country music singer (Athens)
- John Archibald, Pulitzer-prize-winning journalist, author (Birmingham)
- Anthony J. Arduengo, III, chemist, material scientist, professor at University of Alabama (Tuscaloosa)
- R.G. Armstrong, actor (Birmingham)
- Lloyd Austin, secretary of defense nominee (Mobile)
- Ethel Ayler, actress (Whistler)

== B ==
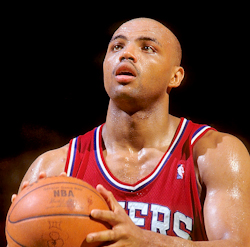
Charles Barkley

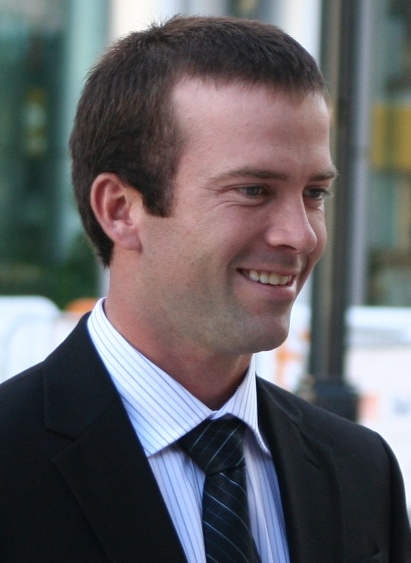
Lucas Black

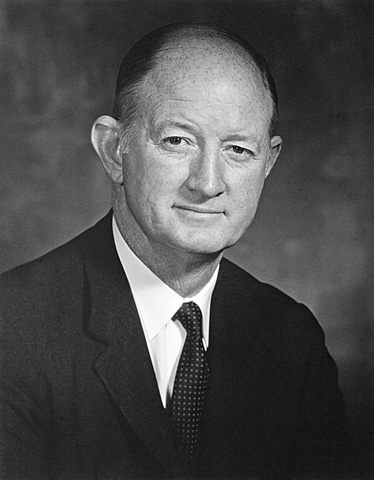
Winton M. Blount

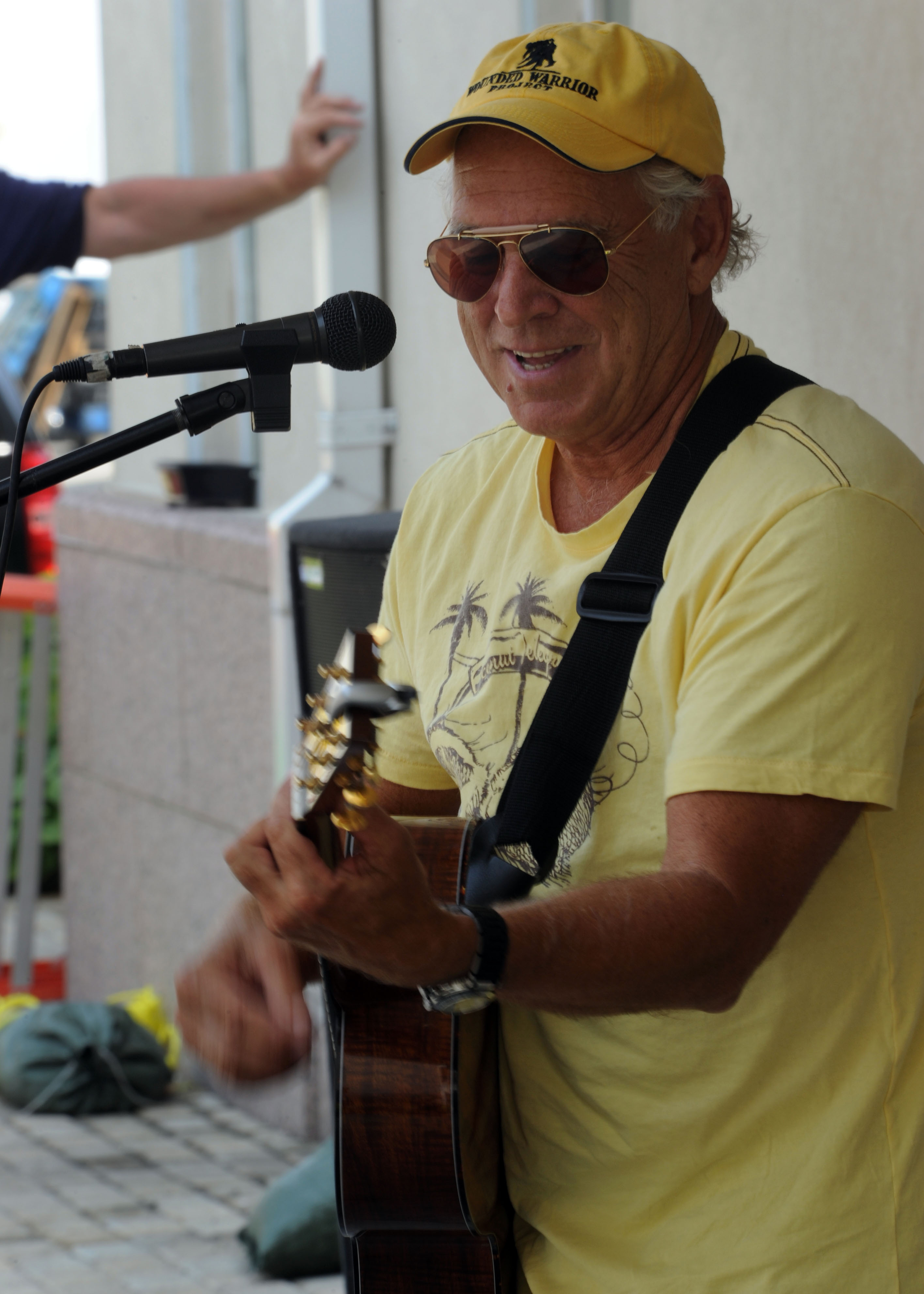
Jimmy Buffett

- Spencer Bachus, representative from Alabama's 6th congressional district 1993–2015 (Vestavia Hills)
- Mary Badham, actress (Birmingham)
- David Baker, activist (Anniston)
- Locy Baker, Alabama House of Representatives 1994–2010 (Abbeville)
- Hank Ballard, singer (Bessemer)
- Tallulah Bankhead, actress (Jasper)
- Charles Barkley, Hall of Fame basketball player, television commentator (Leeds)
- Reggie Barlow, NFL wide receiver, college football coach (Montgomery)
- Desi Barmore (born 1960), American-Israeli basketball player
- Mark Barron, NFL player, St. Louis Rams (Mobile)
- Inez Baskin, African American journalist and civil rights activist (Florala)
- Cynthia Bathurst, animal activist, founder of Safe Humane Chicago and the Court Case Dog Program
- Bill Baxley, lieutenant governor (Dothan)
- Lucy Baxley, lieutenant governor (2003–2007) (Vestavia Hills)
- Colter Bean, former MLB player, New York Yankees (Birmingham)
- Paul Bearer, WWE manager and wrestling promoter (Mobile)
- Jere Beasley, born in Tyler, Texas, lieutenant governor (1971–1979) (Clayton)
- Killer Beaz (born Truett Beasley Jr.), stand-up comedian (Andalusia)
- Scott Beason, Alabama state senator (2006–2014) (Hartselle)
- Barry Beckett, keyboardist, composer, record producer, original member of Muscle Shoals Rhythm Section (Muscle Shoals)
- Ann Bedsole, member of both houses, consecutively, of the Alabama State Legislature 1979–1995 (Mobile)
- Regina Benjamin, surgeon general of the United States (Mobile)
- Earl Bennett, NFL wide receiver (Birmingham)
- Amber Benson, actress (Birmingham)
- Bo Bice, singer, American Idol runner-up (Huntsville)
- Michael Biehn, actor (Anniston)
- James Gillespie Birney (1792–1857), planter, attorney, abolitionist (Huntsville)
- Sanford Bishop, U.S. representative from Georgia's 2nd congressional district (Mobile)
- Hugo Black, U.S. senator, United States Supreme Court justice (Harlan)
- Lucas Black, actor (Speake)
- I. M. E. Blandin, writer (Uniontown)
- Thomas Edwin Blanton Jr., white supremacist and co-conspirator in the 16th Street Baptist Church bombing (Birmingham)
- Eric Bledsoe, NBA player, Milwaukee Bucks (Birmingham)
- Winton Blount, businessman, U.S. postmaster general (1969–1972) (Union Springs)
- Michael Boley, NFL linebacker (Gadsden)
- Jo Bonner, representative from Alabama's 1st congressional district (2003–2013) (Mobile)
- Judy L. Bonner, first female and 28th president of the University of Alabama (2012–2015) (Mobile)
- Neil Bonnett, NASCAR driver (Hueytown)
- Margaret Boozer, sculptor (Anniston)
- Young Boozer, state treasurer (Montgomery)
- Stephen "tWitch" Boss, freestyle hip-hop dancer, entertainer, and actor (Montgomery)
- Th-resa Bostick, IFBB professional bodybuilder (Birmingham)
- Albert Boutwell, lieutenant governor (1959–1963), mayor of Birmingham (1963–1967) (Birmingham)
- Bobby Bowden, college football coach, Florida State (Birmingham)
- Larry Bowie, former NFL player, Washington Redskins (Anniston)
- Frank W. Boykin, former U.S. representative (Bladon Springs)
- Robert Bradley's Blackwater Surprise, music group (Evergreen)
- Rick Bragg, Pulitzer Prize-winning author (Possum Trot)
- Debbie Bramwell-Washington, IFBB professional bodybuilder (Birmingham)
- Jeff Brantley, MLB player, ESPN sportscaster
- Albert P. Brewer, governor (1968–1971) (Birmingham)
- Jeff Briggs, businessman, video game pioneer (Florence)
- Bobby Bright, mayor of Montgomery (1999–2009), representative from Alabama's 2nd congressional district (2009–2011) (Montgomery)
- Eric Brock, former NFL player (Alexander City)
- David G. Bronner, CEO of Retirement Systems of Alabama (Montgomery), born in Cresco, Iowa
- Mo Brooks, representative from Alabama's 5th congressional district since 2011 (Huntsville)
- Janice Rogers Brown, U.S. Court of Appeals judge (Luverne)
- Jerry Dolyn Brown, folk artist, traditional potter (Hamilton)
- Johnny Mack Brown, football player for Alabama, actor (Dothan)
- Mary Ward Brown, short story writer and memoirist (Hamburg)
- Michael Brown, astronomer (Huntsville)
- Roger Brown, artist, member of the Chicago Imagists (Hamilton)
- Paul "Bear" Bryant, iconic coach of Alabama football, born in Camden, Arkansas (Tuscaloosa)
- John Hall Buchanan Jr., representative from Alabama's 6th congressional district (1965–1981) (Birmingham and thereafter Bethesda, Maryland)
- Jimmy Buffett, singer-songwriter (Mobile), born in Pascagoula, Mississippi
- Bill Burgess, college football head coach, Jacksonville State (Birmingham)
- Edward M. Burgess, chemist (Birmingham), inventor of the Burgess reagent
- Edward A. Burkhalter, admiral, United States Navy, Chief of Naval Intelligence, Chief of Staff, Defense Intelligence Agency (Roanoke)
- Brett Butler, actress (Montgomery)
- Keith Butler, NFL coach, Pittsburgh Steelers (Anniston)
- Pat Buttram, actor (Addison)
- Larry Byrom, rock music guitarist, Steppenwolf (Huntsville)

== C ==
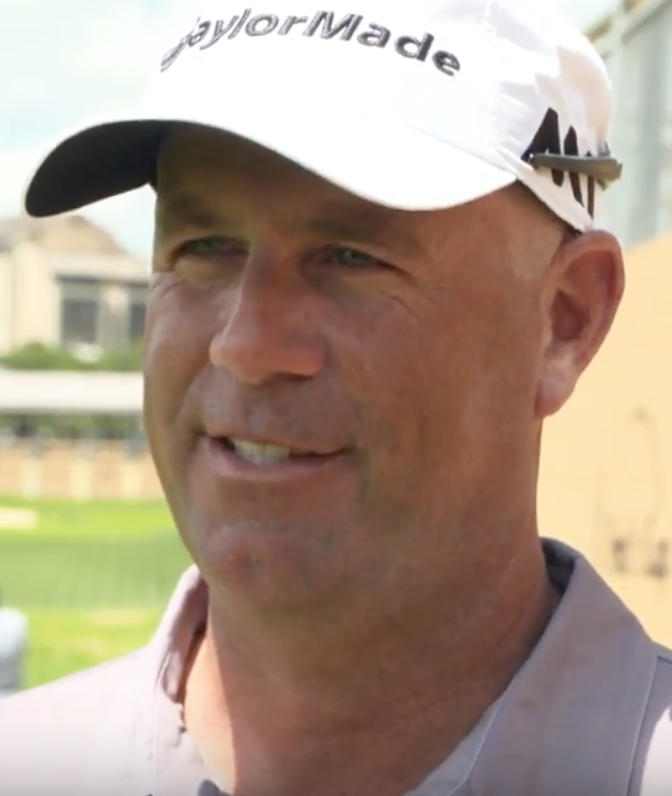
Stewart Cink

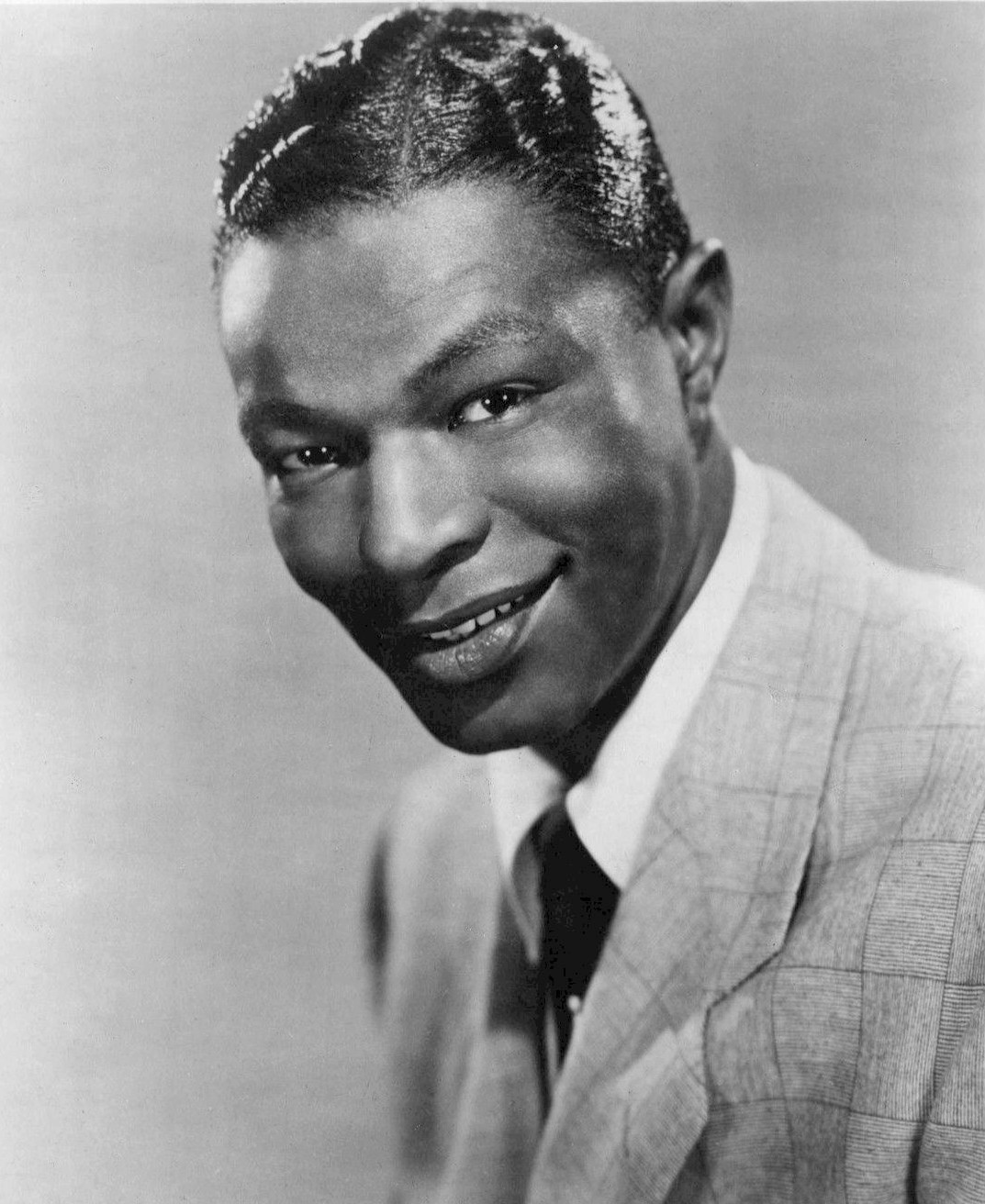
Nat King Cole

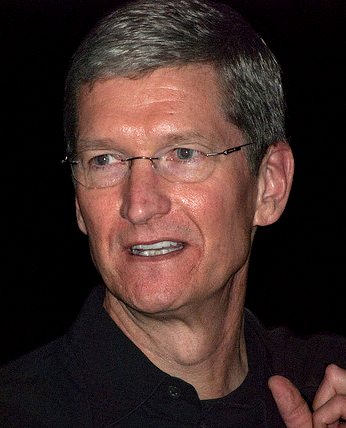
Tim Cook

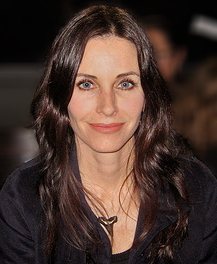
Courteney Cox

- Matt Cain, baseball player, San Francisco Giants (Dothan)
- Antoine Caldwell, NFL player, Houston Texans (Montgomery)
- Sonny Callahan, representative from Alabama's 1st congressional district (1985–2003) (Mobile)
- Julia Campbell, actress (Huntsville)
- Eli Capilouto, twelfth president of the University of Kentucky (Montgomery)
- Truman Capote, author of In Cold Blood, born in Louisiana (Monroeville)
- Robert Daniel Carmichael, mathematician (born in Goodwater)
- Edward Earl Carnes, judge, United States Court of Appeals for the Eleventh Circuit (Albertville)
- DeMarre Carroll, NBA player, Brooklyn Nets (Birmingham)
- Clarence Carter, soul singer and musician (Montgomery)
- Forrest Carter, writer
- Jonathan Carter, former NFL player (Anniston)
- Nell Carter, actress, singer (Birmingham)
- George Washington Carver, scientist, botanist, born in Diamond, Missouri (Tuskegee)
- Herman Frank Cash, white supremacist and co-conspirator in the 16th Street Baptist Church bombing (Birmingham)
- Tim Castille, NFL player, Kansas City Chiefs (Birmingham)
- Reg E. Cathey, actor (Huntsville)
- Quinton Caver, former NFL player (Anniston)
- Robert Edward Chambliss, white supremacist and co-conspirator in the 16th Street Baptist Church bombing (Birmingham)
- Hosea Chanchez, actor (Montgomery)
- Josh Chapman, NFL defensive lineman, Indianapolis Colts (Hoover)
- Katharine Hopkins Chapman, author and historian (Selma)
- Teresa Cheatham, Miss Alabama 1978 (Wellington)
- Elaine Cheris (born 1946), Olympic fencer
- Bobby Frank Cherry, white supremacist and co-conspirator in the 16th Street Baptist Church bombing (Birmingham)
- Chika, rapper
- Fred Child, host of American Public Media's Performance Today (Huntsville)
- Mark Childress, writer (Monroeville)
- Stewart Cink, professional golfer (Huntsville)
- Bill Clark, college football head coach, University of Alabama (Piedmont)
- Bob Clark, actor, director, screenwriter (Birmingham)
- Jeremy Clark, NFL player, Dallas Cowboys (Daphne)
- Mattie Moss Clark, gospel artist, mother of gospel group The Clark Sisters (Selma)
- Clever, rapper (Gadsden)
- Nat King Cole, singer (Montgomery)
- Ronnie Coleman, football player, Alabama A&M and NFL's Houston Oilers (Jasper)
- Kaitlan Collins, journalist at CNN (Prattville)
- Marva Collins, educator (Monroeville)
- Commodores, funk/soul band (Tuskegee)
- Fred Cone, football player for Clemson and NFL's Green Bay Packers, Dallas Cowboys (Pine Apple)
- Bull Connor, politician who opposed the activities of the Civil Rights Movement (Selma)
- Jared Cook, NFL player, St. Louis Rams (Birmingham)
- Jeff Cook, country music guitarist, the band Alabama (Fort Payne)
- Tim Cook, CEO of Apple Inc. (Robertsdale)
- Algernon J. Cooper, former mayor of Prichard (Mobile)
- Charles J. Cooper, former assistant United States attorney general (Birmingham)
- Miles Copeland Jr., musician, CIA officer (Birmingham)
- Jerricho Cotchery, NFL player, Carolina Panthers (Birmingham)
- DeMarcus Cousins, basketball player, Golden State Warriors (Mobile)
- Dennis Covington, author (Birmingham)
- Courteney Cox, actress (Mountain Brook)
- Laverne Cox, actress and LGBTQ activist (Mobile)
- Tony Cox, actor (Uniontown)
- Clayne Crawford, actor (Clay)
- Rick Crawford, NASCAR Craftsman Truck Series driver (Mobile)
- Julia Pleasants Creswell, poet, novelist (Huntsville)
- Howard Cross, football player for Alabama and NFL's New York Giants (Owens Cross Roads)
- Ashley Crow, actress (Birmingham)
- Brodie Croyle, NFL player, Kansas City Chiefs (Rainbow City)
- Korey Cunningham, NFL player, New England Patriots (Montevallo)
- Michael Curry, NBA coach, Philadelphia 76ers (Anniston)

== D ==
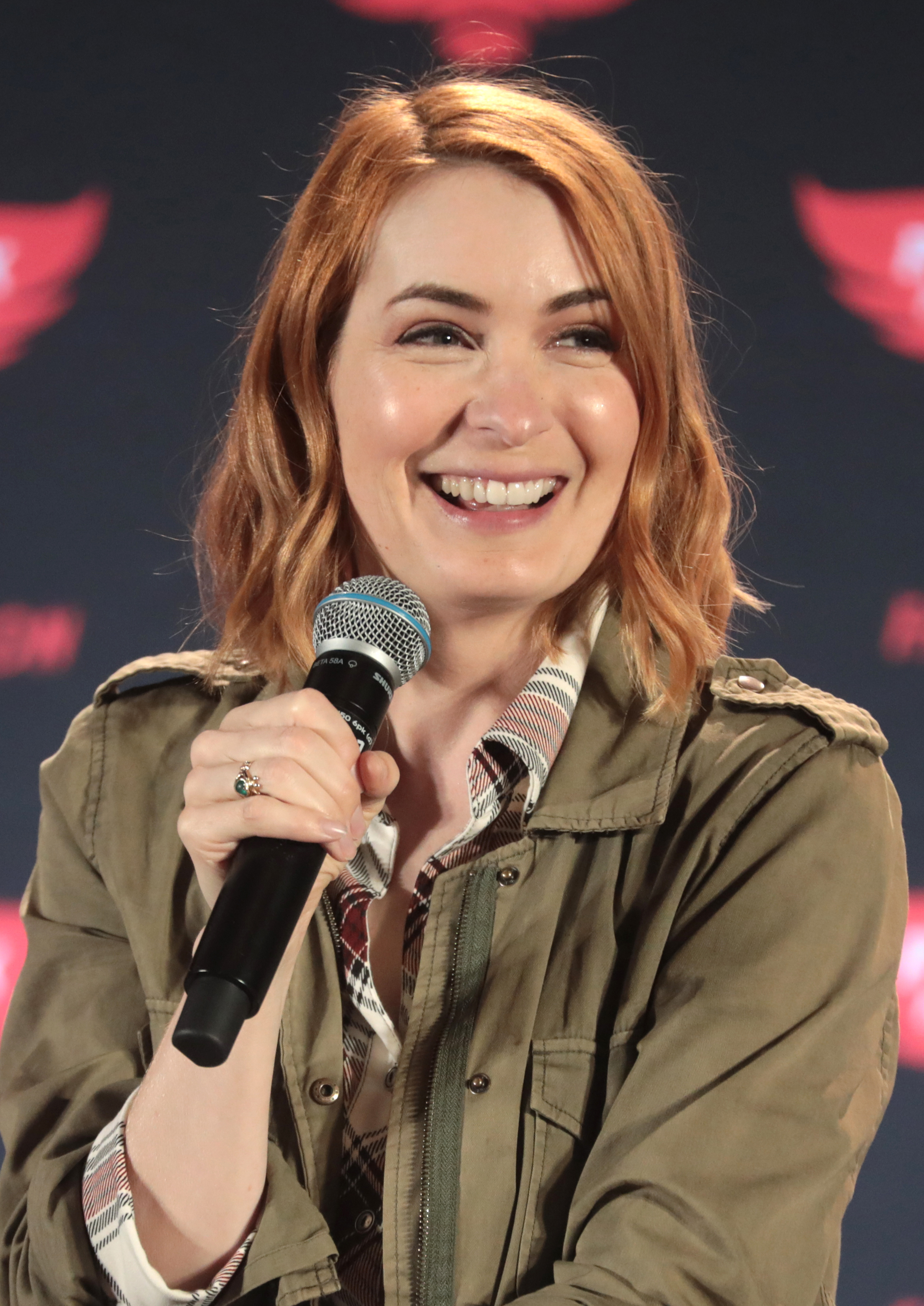
Felicia Day

- Marcell Dareus, NFL player, Buffalo Bills (Birmingham)
- Angela Davis, communist activist (Birmingham)
- Artur Davis, representative from Alabama's 7th congressional district (2003–2011) (Birmingham)
- Mollie Evelyn Moore Davis, poet, writer, educator (Talladega)
- N. Jan Davis, astronaut, born in Cocoa Beach, Florida (Huntsville)
- Russ Davis, baseball player (Birmingham)
- Tae Davis, NFL player, New York Giants (Oxford)
- Felicia Day, actress, writer, director, violinist, and singer (Huntsville)
- Joe Dawson, American-Israeli basketball player, 1992 Israeli Basketball Premier League MVP
- Grant Dayton, baseball player (Huntsville)
- Oscar Stanton De Priest, U.S. congressman from Illinois, civil rights advocate (Florence)
- Morris Dees, founder of Southern Poverty Law Center (Montgomery)
- Sam Dees, soul music singer (Birmingham)
- Diana DeGarmo, American Idol contestant (Birmingham)
- David L. DeJarnette, influential archaeologist (Bessemer)
- Jeremiah Denton, prisoner of war in Vietnam, U.S. senator (1981–1987) (Mobile)
- Donna D'Errico, actress (Dothan)
- James Deshler, Confederate brigadier general (Tuscumbia)
- Quinton Dial, NFL player, San Francisco 49ers (Andalusia)
- Kim Dickens, actress (Huntsville)
- Chris Dickerson, bodybuilder (Montgomery)
- Mahala Ashley Dickerson, lawyer (Montgomery)
- Parnell Dickinson, NFL quarterback, Tampa Bay Buccaneers (Brighton)
- William Louis Dickinson, representative from Alabama's 2nd congressional district (1965–1993) (Montgomery)
- Oliver W. Dillard, military leader (Margaret)
- Larry Dixon, state representative and state senator, Oklahoma native (Montgomery)
- Larry Donnell, football player, New York Giants (Ozark)
- Vince Dooley, football coach (Mobile)
- Nic Dowd, ice hockey player (Huntsville)
- Deidre Downs, 2005 Miss America (Pelham)
- John Drew, NBA player, Atlanta Hawks Utah Jazz (Vredenburgh)
- DSharp, violinist, DJ (Anniston)
- Erwin Dudley, basketball player (Uniontown)
- Benjamin Minge Duggar, botanist, discoverer of tetracycline (Gallion)
- Luther Duncan, 4-H pioneer, educator and administrator (Auburn)
- Alan Dunn, MLB bullpen coach, Baltimore Orioles (Gadsden)

== E ==
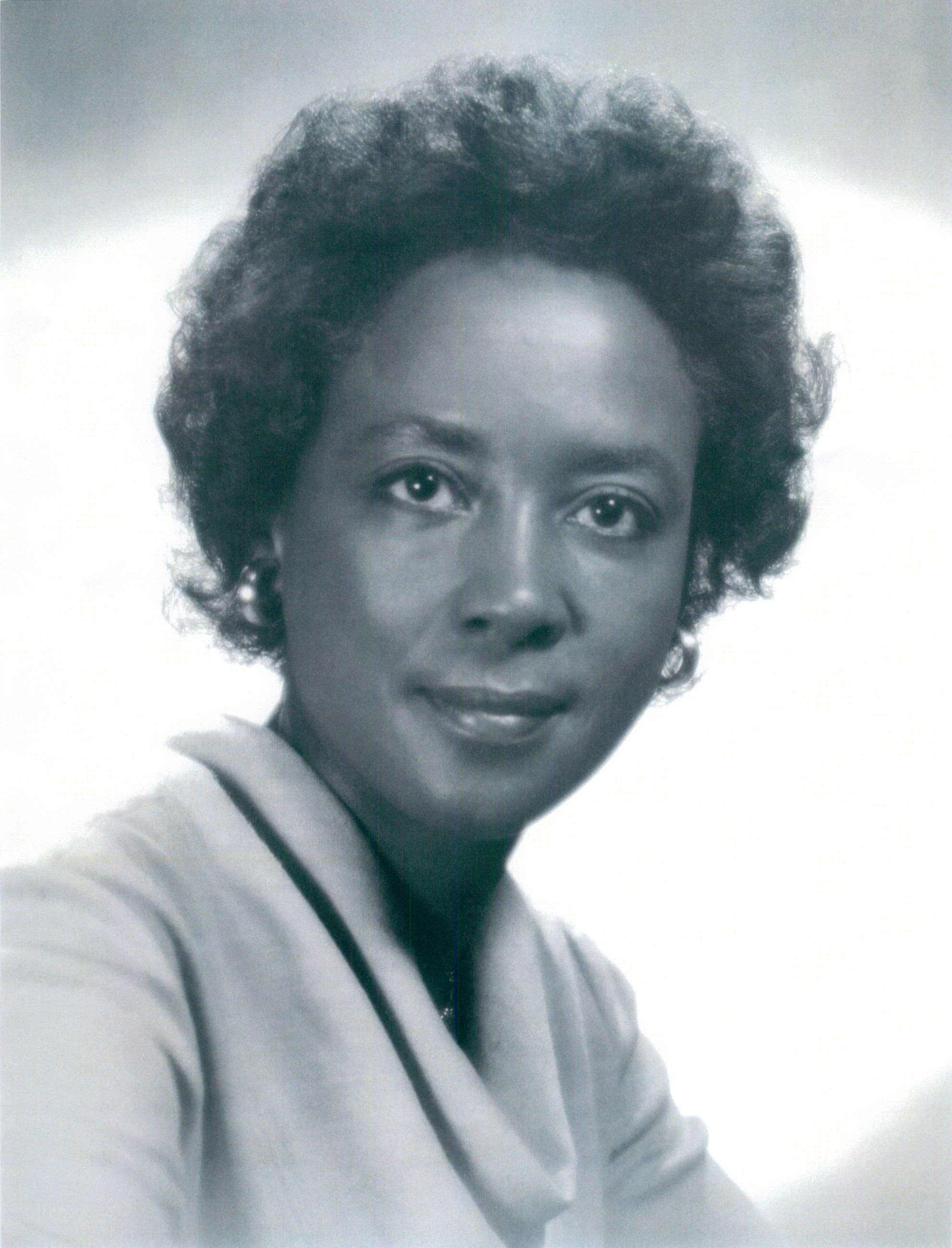
Annie Easley

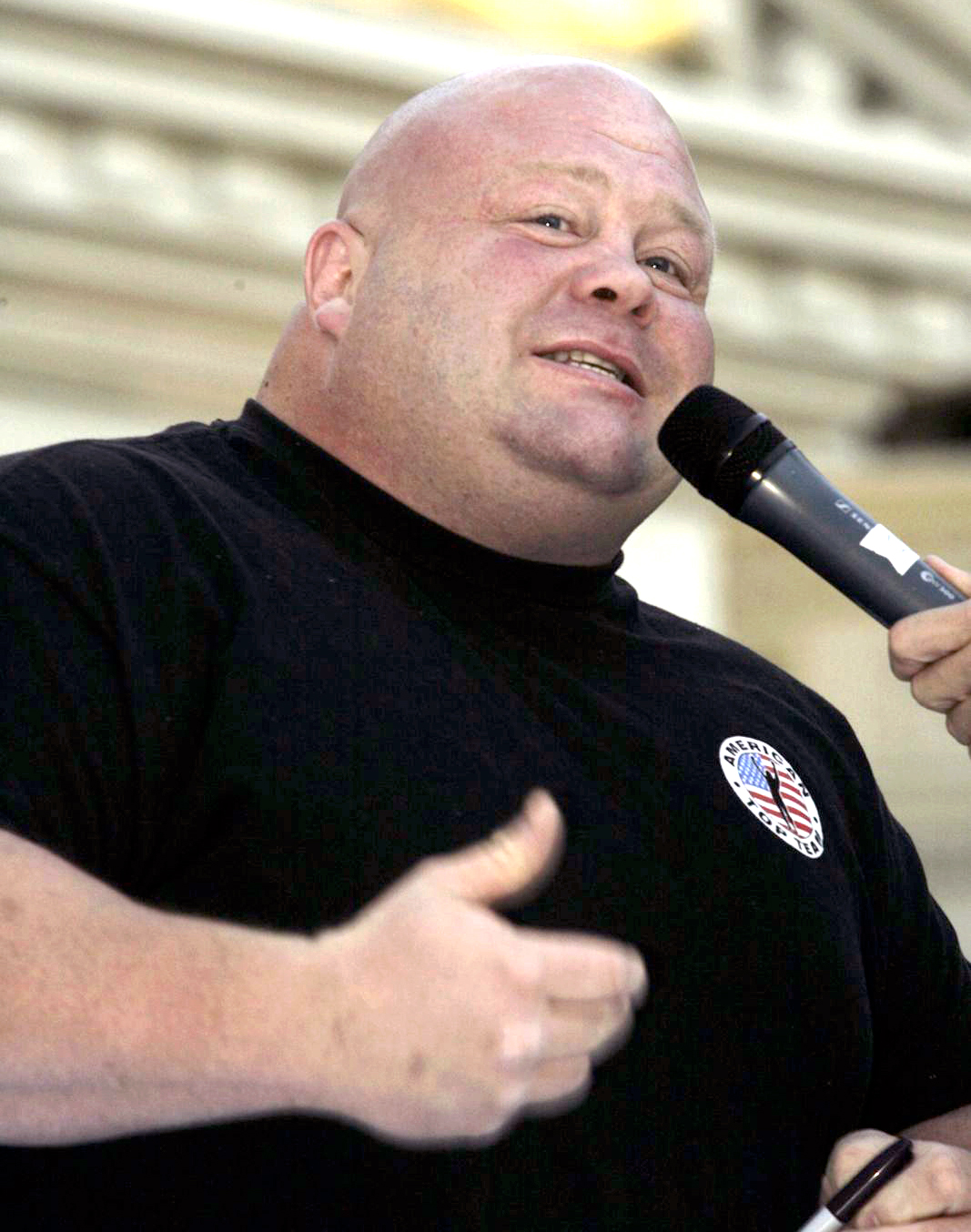
Eric Esch

- Bobby Eaton, pro wrestler (Huntsville)
- Annie Easley, mathematician and rocket scientist (Birmingham)
- Cleveland Eaton, jazz bassist (Birmingham)
- Dennis Edwards, soul music singer (Birmingham)
- Jack Edwards, state representative (1965–85) (Mobile)
- Joe F. Edwards Jr., astronaut, born in Richmond, Virginia (Roanoke and Lineville)
- Carl Elliott, state representative (1949–65) (Jasper)
- Jake Elmore, MLB player, Tampa Bay Rays (Pleasant Grove)
- Trae Elston, football player (Anniston)
- Eric Esch, a.k.a. Butterbean, boxer (Jasper)
- James Reese Europe, bandleader, composer (Mobile)
- Rodney J. Evans, Medal of Honor recipient (Florala)
- Terry Everett, state representative (1993–09) (Enterprise)

== F ==
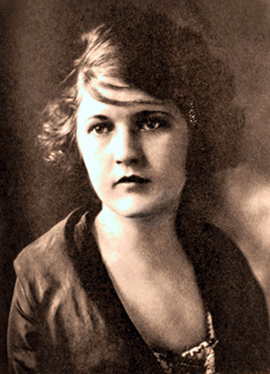
Zelda Fitzgerald

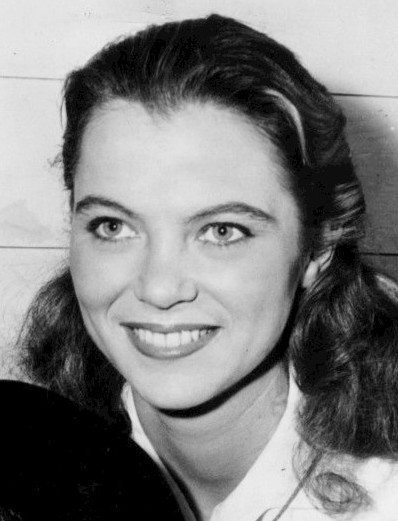
Louise Fletcher

- Nick Fairley, NFL defensive lineman, St. Louis Rams (Mobile)
- Red Farmer, former NASCAR driver (Hueytown)
- Paul Finebaum, columnist, author, radio personality, born in Memphis
- Howard Finster, folk artist (Valley Head)
- Zelda Fitzgerald, writer (Montgomery)
- Fannie Flagg, author and actress (Birmingham)
- Louise Fletcher, Oscar-winning actress (Birmingham)
- Flo Milli, rapper, singer, songwriter (Mobile)
- Richmond Flowers Jr., football player (Dothan)
- Richmond Flowers Sr., attorney general and activist (Dothan)
- Trey Flowers, NFL defensive end, New England Patriots (Huntsville)
- Vonetta Flowers, Olympic gold medalist in bobsled, 2002 Salt Lake City Olympics (Birmingham)
- Wayne Flynt, editor-in-chief of Encyclopedia of Alabama (Auburn)
- Emory Folmar, mayor of Montgomery (1977–1999), Republican gubernatorial nominee in 1982 (Montgomery)
- James Folsom Jr., governor (1993–1995), lieutenant governor (1987–1993 and 2007–2011) (Cullman)
- Jim Folsom, governor (1947–1951 and 1955–1959) (Cullman)
- Dee Ford, NFL player, Kansas City Chiefs (Odenville)
- Joe Forehand, CEO of First Data (Alexander City)
- George Foster, MLB player (Tuscaloosa)
- Reuben Foster, NFL player, Washington Football Team (Roanoke)
- Jalston Fowler, NFL player, Tennessee Titans (Mobile)
- Melvin Franklin, soul music singer (Montgomery)
- Scottie McKenzie Frasier, teacher, author, newspaper editor, lecturer, socialite, and suffragist (Talladega)
- Chris Fryar, drummer for Zac Brown Band (Birmingham)

== G ==
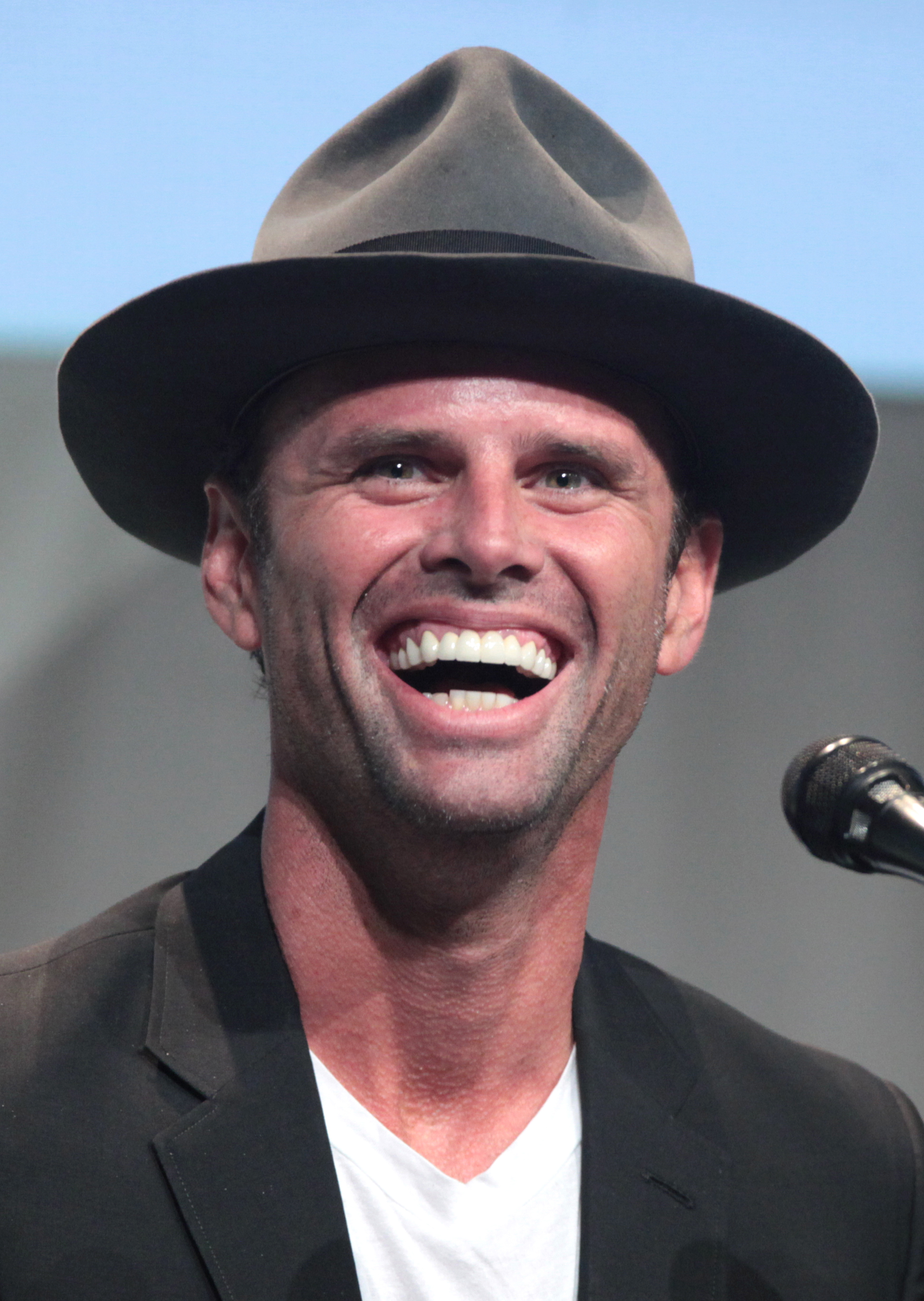
Walton Goggins

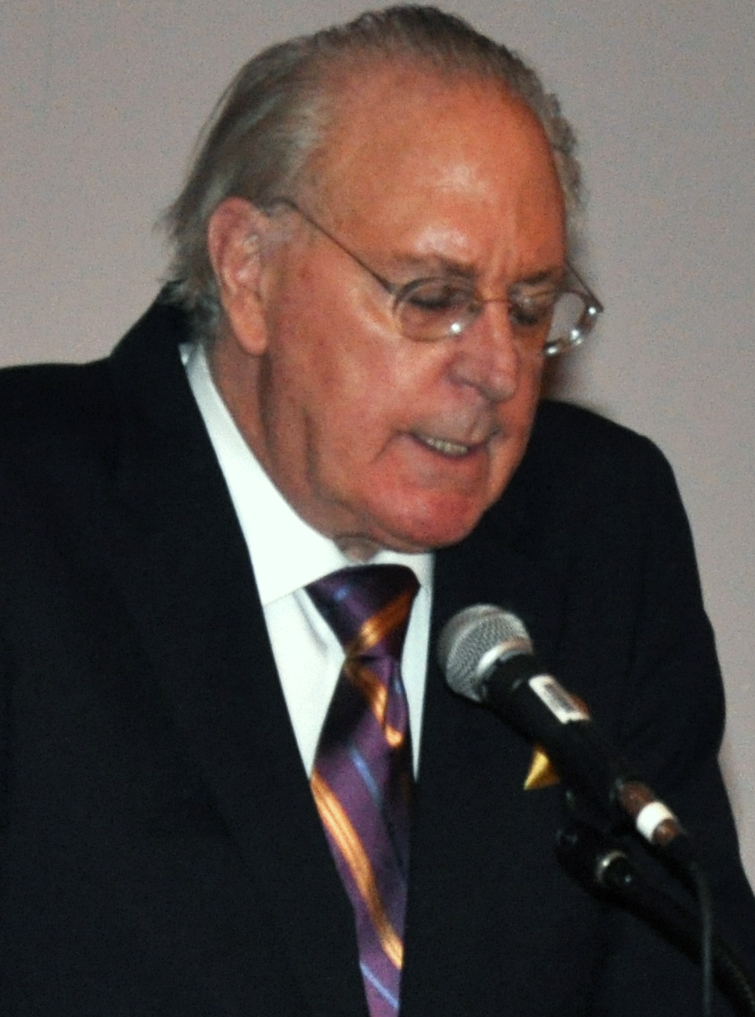
Winston Groom

- Noah Galloway, former United States Army soldier and contestant on Dancing with the Stars season 20 (Birmingham)
- Oscar Gamble, Major League Baseball outfielder (Ramer)
- Pat Garrett, sheriff of Lincoln County, New Mexico, killed Billy the Kid (Cusseta)
- A.G. Gaston, businessman, civil rights activist (Birmingham)
- Betty Lou Gerson, voice actress, "Cruella de Vil" of One Hundred and One Dalmatians (Birmingham)
- Charles Ghigna, poet, author (Homewood)
- Eleanor Churchill Gibbs, educator, writer (Livingston)
- Robert Gibbs, press secretary for President Barack Obama (Auburn)
- Kenneth A. Gibson, first black mayor of major eastern city (Newark, New Jersey, 1970–1986) (Enterprise)
- Kenneth R. Giddens, director of Voice of America, TV and radio station founder (Pine Apple)
- Wallace Gilberry, NFL defensive end, Cincinnati Bengals (Bay Minette)
- Horace Gillom, NFL player, Cleveland Browns (Roanoke)
- Samuel Ginn, pioneer in wireless communications industry (Anniston)
- Brian Ginsberg (born 1966), gymnast, two-time US junior national gymnastics champion
- Mark Gitenstein, former U.S. ambassador to Romania (Florala)
- Mickell Gladness, NBA player, Miami Heat (Sylacauga)
- Harvey Glance, track and field athlete (Phenix City)
- Walton Goggins, actor (Birmingham)
- Eli Gold, sportscaster, born in New York (Birmingham)
- William Lee Golden, country music singer, The Oak Ridge Boys (East Brewton)
- Bobby Goldsboro, singer (Dothan)
- Tina Gordon, NASCAR driver (Cedar Bluff)
- William C. Gorgas, U.S. Army Surgeon General (Mobile)
- Vern Gosdin, country and gospel singer (Woodland)
- Mike Gottfried, former college football coach, ESPN commentator (Mobile)
- Charles Graddick, judge and attorney general of Alabama (1975–1983) (Mobile)
- Beth Grant, actress (Gadsden)
- John Grass, college football coach, Jacksonville State University (Ashville)
- Kendall Graveman, MLB player, Oakland A's (Alexander City)
- Chris Gray, NFL player (Homewood)
- Floride Green, photographer (Eutaw or Mobile)
- Hank Green, vlogger and musician (Birmingham)
- Leamon Green, visual artist (Anniston)
- Urbie Green, jazz trombonist (Mobile)
- Frances Nimmo Greene, educator and author (Tuscaloosa)
- Kevin Greene, NFL player (Anniston), born in Schenectady, New York
- Rusty Greer, MLB player, Texas Rangers (Albertville)
- John Grenier, Republican politician (Birmingham)
- Parker Griffith, representative from Alabama's 5th congressional district (2009–2011) (Huntsville)
- Dexter Grimsley, Alabama House of Representative since 2010 (Abbeville)
- Steve Grissom, NASCAR driver (Gadsden)
- Winston Groom, author of Forrest Gump (Fairhope)
- Gabe Gross, MLB player, Oakland A's (Dothan)
- Lafayette Guild, pioneer in research of yellow fever (Tuscaloosa)
- Marquies Gunn, former NFL player (Alexander City)
- Annabelle Gurwitch, actress (Mobile)

== H ==
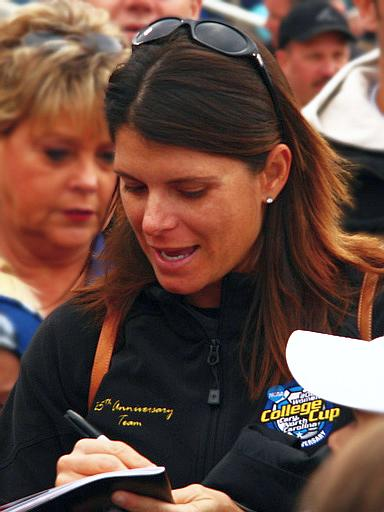
Mia Hamm

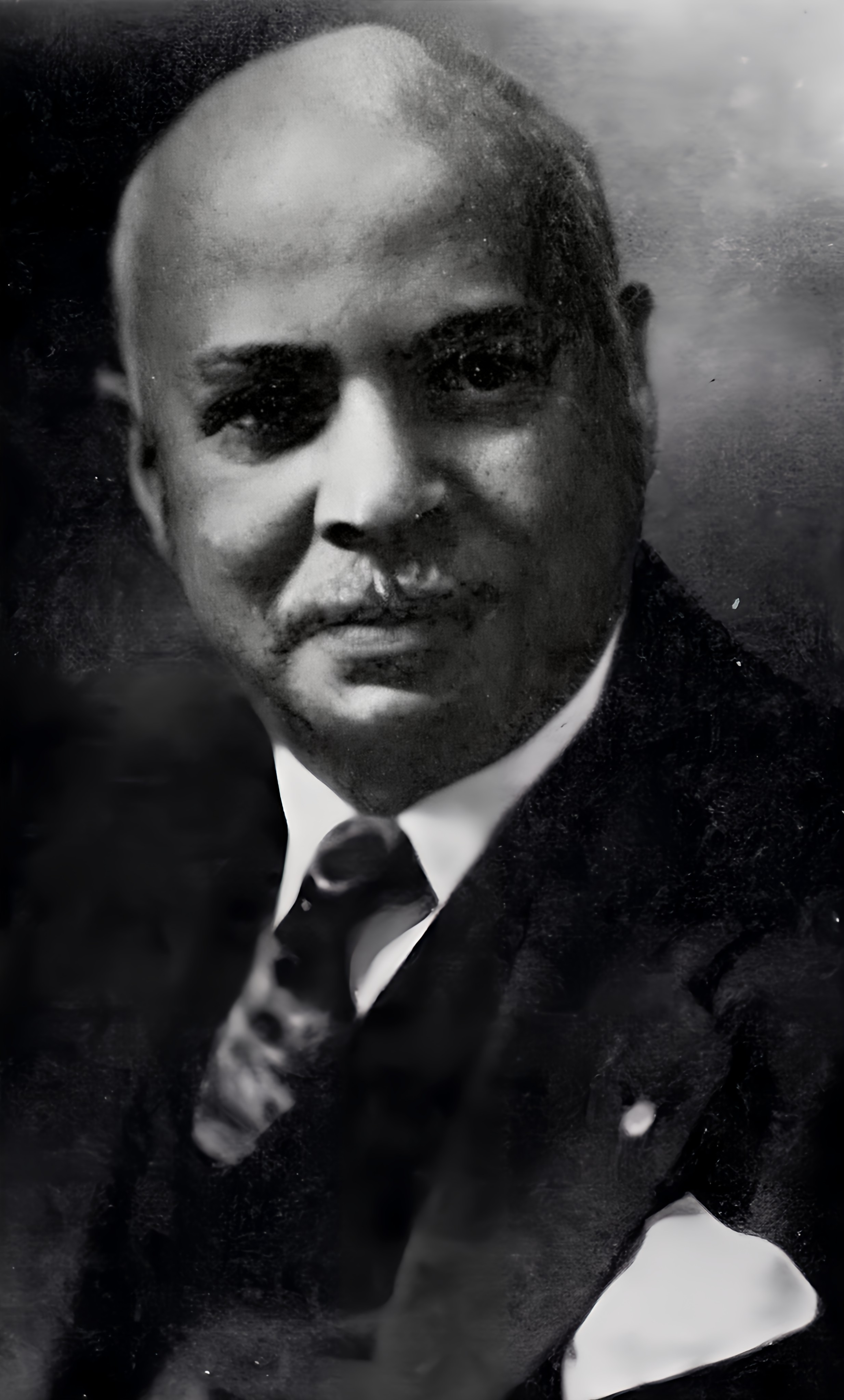
W. C. Handy

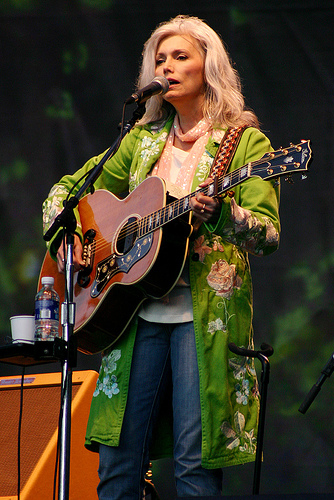
Emmylou Harris

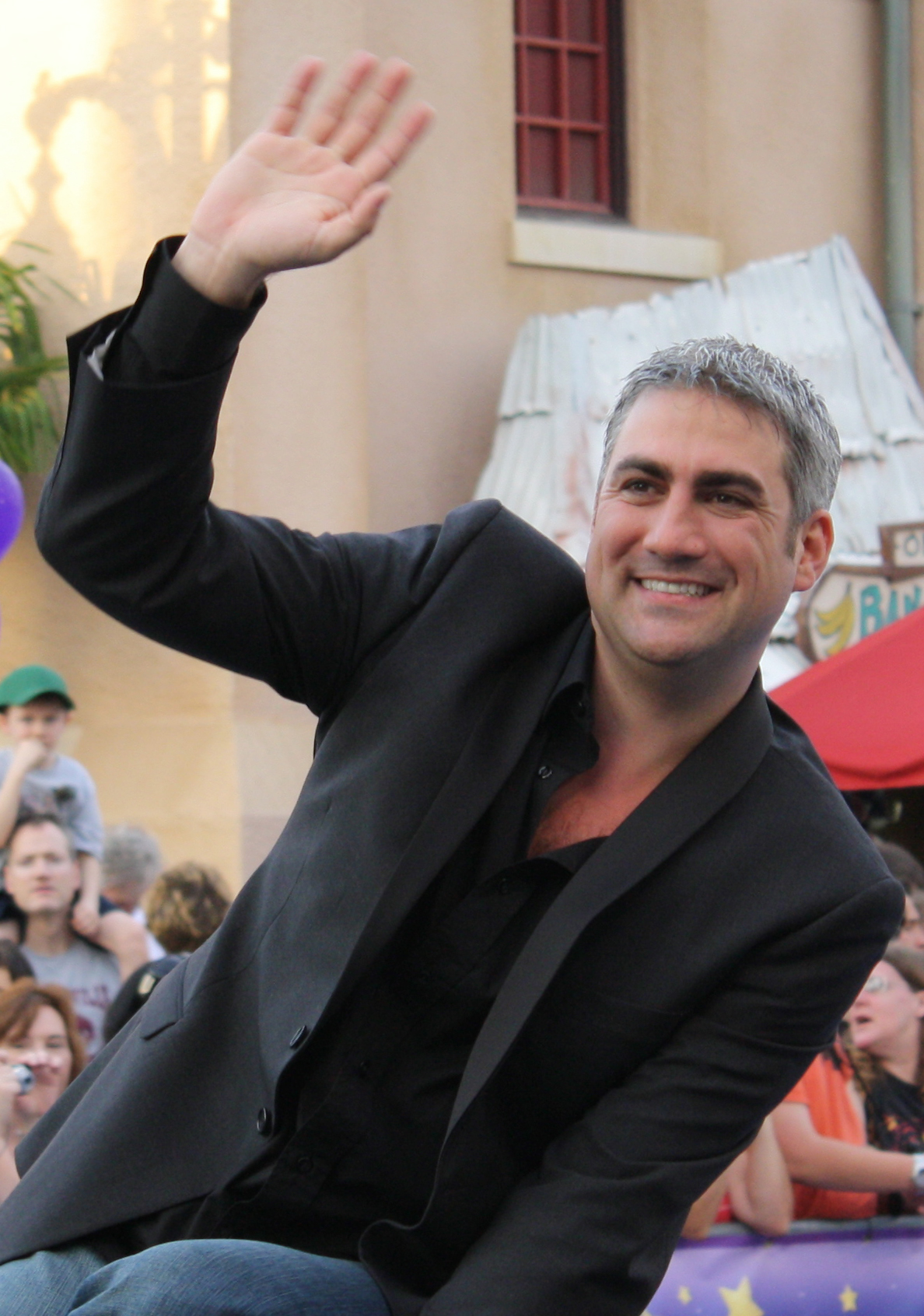
Taylor Hicks

- Charles F. Hackmeyer, mayor of Mobile
- Rick Hall, record producer (Muscle Shoals)
- Mary Katharine Ham, journalist, video blogger, Fox News contributor (Montgomery)
- Mia Hamm, soccer player, Olympic and World Cup champion (Selma)
- Chris Hammond, MLB pitcher (Vestavia Hills)
- Cully Hamner, comic book artist and writer
- Lionel Hampton, jazz musician (Birmingham)
- Jon Hand, football player (Sylacauga)
- W. C. Handy, jazz composer (Florence)
- Charley Hannah, former NFL player (Albertville)
- John Hannah, Hall of Fame football player, Alabama and NFL's New England Patriots, born in Georgia (Albertville)
- John M. Harbert, billionaire businessman (construction, investments, coal mining properties) (Mountain Brook)
- Marguerite Harbert, billionaire heiress (Mountain Brook)
- George Hardy, actor, Troll 2 (Alexander City)
- James Harman, singer (Anniston)
- Roman Harper, NFL player, Carolina Panthers (Prattville)
- Emmylou Harris, singer (Birmingham)
- Belle R. Harrison, poet and short story writer (Camden)
- William R. Harvey, president of Hampton University (Brewton)
- Gustav Hasford, writer, screenwriter (Russellville)
- Erskine Hawkins, jazz composer (Birmingham)
- George C. Hawkins, member of both houses of the Alabama legislature (Gadsden)
- Alexander T. Hawthorn, Confederate States Army general (Conecuh County)
- Glenn Hearn, mayor of Huntsville, FBI special agent, Alabama legislator (Albertville)
- Howell Heflin, chief justice, Alabama Supreme Court, United States senator (1979–1997), born in Poulan, Georgia (Tuscumbia)
- Kurt Heinecke, music composer, songwriter, voice actor, photographer (Cullman)
- John S. Hendricks, founder, chair and CEO of Discovery Networks (Huntsville)
- Richard Hendrix, basketball player (Athens)
- Alexis Herman, former secretary of labor (Mobile)
- Will Herring, NFL player, New Orleans Saints (Opelika)
- Jake Hess, gospel quartet singer (Haleyville)
- Taylor Hicks, singer, American Idol winner 2006 (Hoover)
- Harlon Hill, football player, Chicago Bears (Killen)
- Howard Hill, professional archer and stunt archer for films (Wilsonville)
- J. Lister Hill, United States senator (1938–1969) (Montgomery)
- Sammie Lee Hill, football player, Detroit Lions (West Blocton)
- Joe Hilley, author (Grand Bay)
- Brent Hinds, singer, guitarist, Mastodon (Pelham)
- Eddie Hinton, musician (Birmingham)
- Sylvia Hitchcock, Miss USA and Miss Universe 1967 (Tuscaloosa)
- Chandler Hoffman, Major League Soccer player, Los Angeles Galaxy (Birmingham)
- Robert Hoffman, actor (Madison)
- Bill Holbrook, syndicated comic strip artist (Huntsville)
- Mitch Holleman, actor, Reba (Auburn)
- Lonnie Holley, artist (Birmingham)
- Polly Holliday, actress (Jasper)
- Fred Nall Hollis, artist (Troy)
- Condredge Holloway, CFL player (Huntsville)
- Hardcore Holly, WWE star (Mobile)
- Cliff Holman, television personality (Mobile)
- Evander Holyfield, World Heavyweight Championship boxer (Atmore)
- Perry O. Hooper Jr., member of the Alabama House of Representatives 1984–2003 (Montgomery)
- Perry O. Hooper, Sr., former chief justice of the Alabama Supreme Court, first Republican to hold that office (Montgomery)
- Robert Horry, basketball player (Andalusia)
- Frank House, baseball player and legislator (Bessemer)
- Brittany Howard, musician (Athens)
- Jordan Howard, football player (Gardendale)
- Linda Howard, romance writer (Gadsden)
- Glenn Howerton, actor (Montgomery)
- Freeman A. Hrabowski III, academic, university president (Birmingham)
- Cooper Huckabee, actor (Mobile)
- Delvin Lamar Hughley, former football player, Colorado Crush (Anniston)
- William Bradford Huie, journalist, author (Hartselle)
- Bobby Humphrey, former NFL player (Birmingham)
- Guy Hunt, governor (1987–1993) (Cullman)
- Alan Hunter, original MTV VeeJay (Birmingham)
- Zora Neale Hurston, author (Notasulga)

== I ==
- Osmond Kelly Ingram, gunner's mate first class, U.S. Navy, WWI Medal of Honor recipient (Oneonta)
- Kay Ivey, politician and current governor (Camden)

== J ==
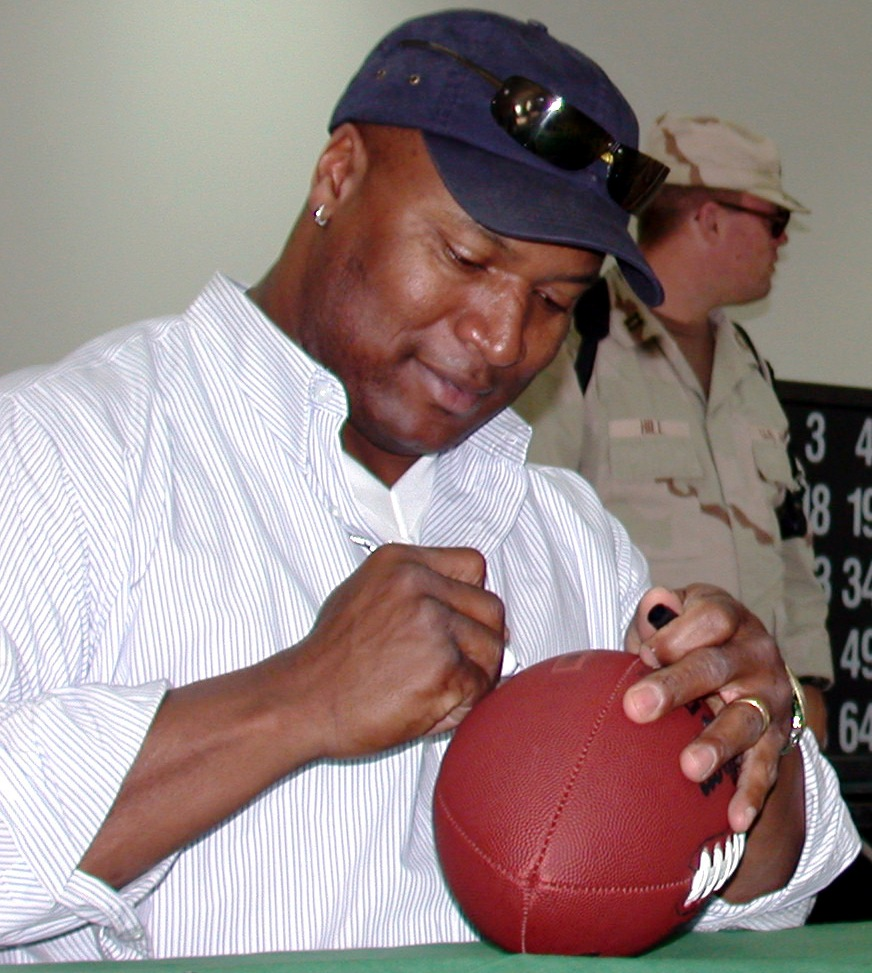
Bo Jackson

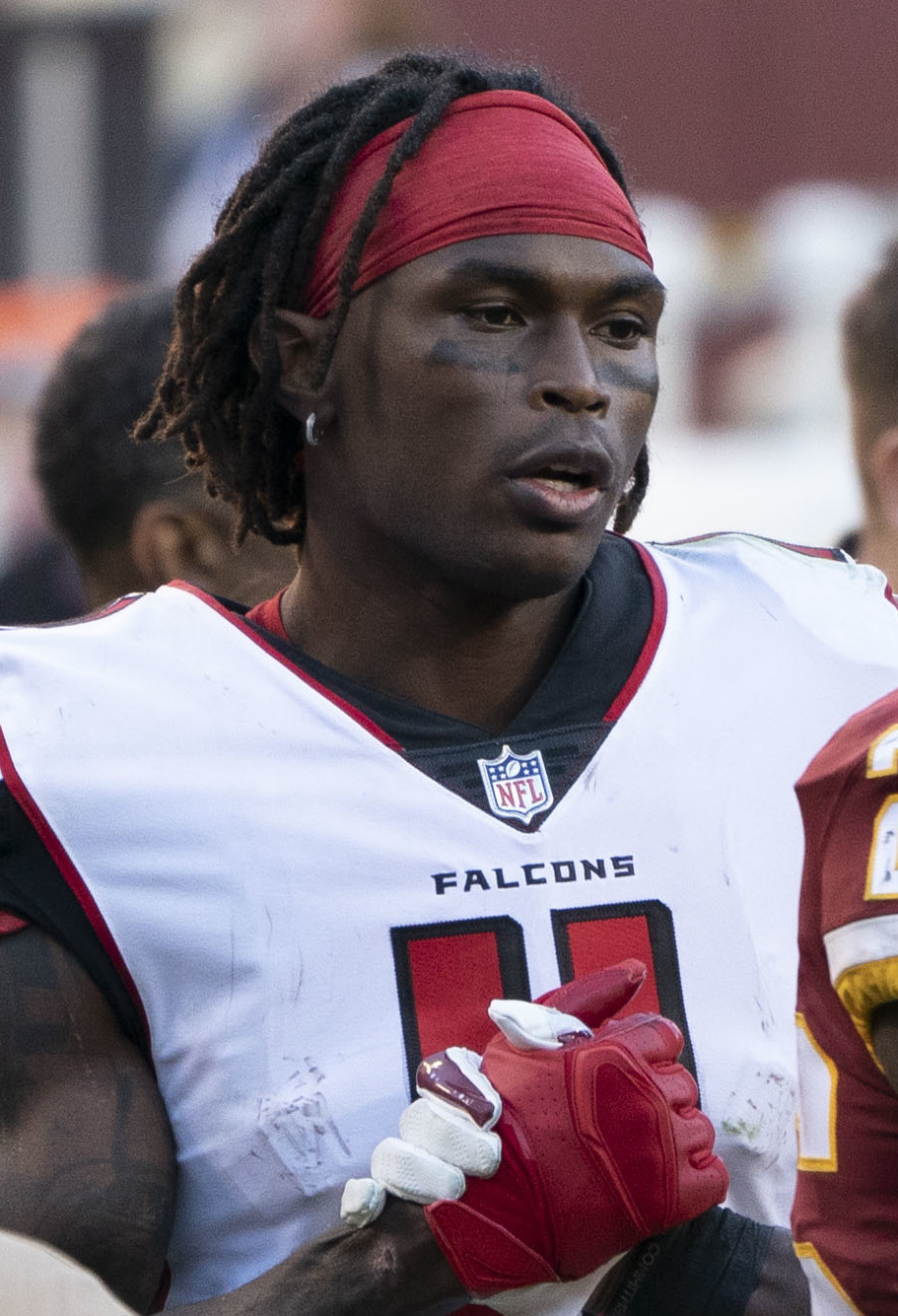
Julio Jones

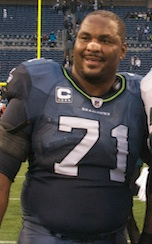
Walter Jones

- Bo Jackson, multi-sport athlete (Bessemer)
- Kate Jackson, actress (Birmingham)
- Katherine Jackson, mother of the Jackson 5 (Barbour County)
- Tarvaris Jackson, NFL player (Montgomery)
- Henry James, former NBA player
- Sonny James, country music singer (Hackleburg)
- Mae C. Jemison, astronaut (Decatur)
- Desmond Jennings, MLB player, Tampa Bay Rays (Birmingham)
- Jerrel Jernigan, NFL player, New York Giants (Eufaula)
- Brandon Johnson, former NFL player (Birmingham)
- Frank Minis Johnson, federal judge (Haleyville)
- Jamey Johnson, country music singer (Montgomery)
- Lonnie Johnson, inventor (Mobile)
- Michael Johnson, NFL player, Cincinnati Bengals (Selma)
- Nico Johnson, former NFL player (Andalusia)
- Rashad Johnson, NFL defensive back, Arizona Cardinals (Sulligent)
- Samuel E. Johnson, businessman (Birmingham)
- Christion Jones, football player (Adamsville)
- Dean Jones, actor (Decatur)
- Denver Jones, basketball player in the Israeli Basketball Premier League (New Market)
- Don Jones, NFL player, San Francisco 49ers (Town Creek)
- Doug Jones, U.S. attorney (1997–2001), U.S. senator from Alabama (2018–2021), and Democratic nominee for the 2026 Alabama gubernatorial election (Fairfield)
- Julio Jones, NFL player, Atlanta Falcons (Foley)
- Orlando Jones, actor (Mobile)
- Robbie Jones, NFL player, New York Giants (Demopolis)
- Walter Jones, NFL Hall of Famer, Seattle Seahawks (Aliceville)
- Lee Roy Jordan, football player, Alabama and NFL's Dallas Cowboys (Excel)
- Ralph "Shug" Jordan, football coach, Auburn University (Selma)
- Tom Joyner, radio personality (Tuskegee)
- Percy Lavon Julian, research chemist (Montgomery)

== K ==
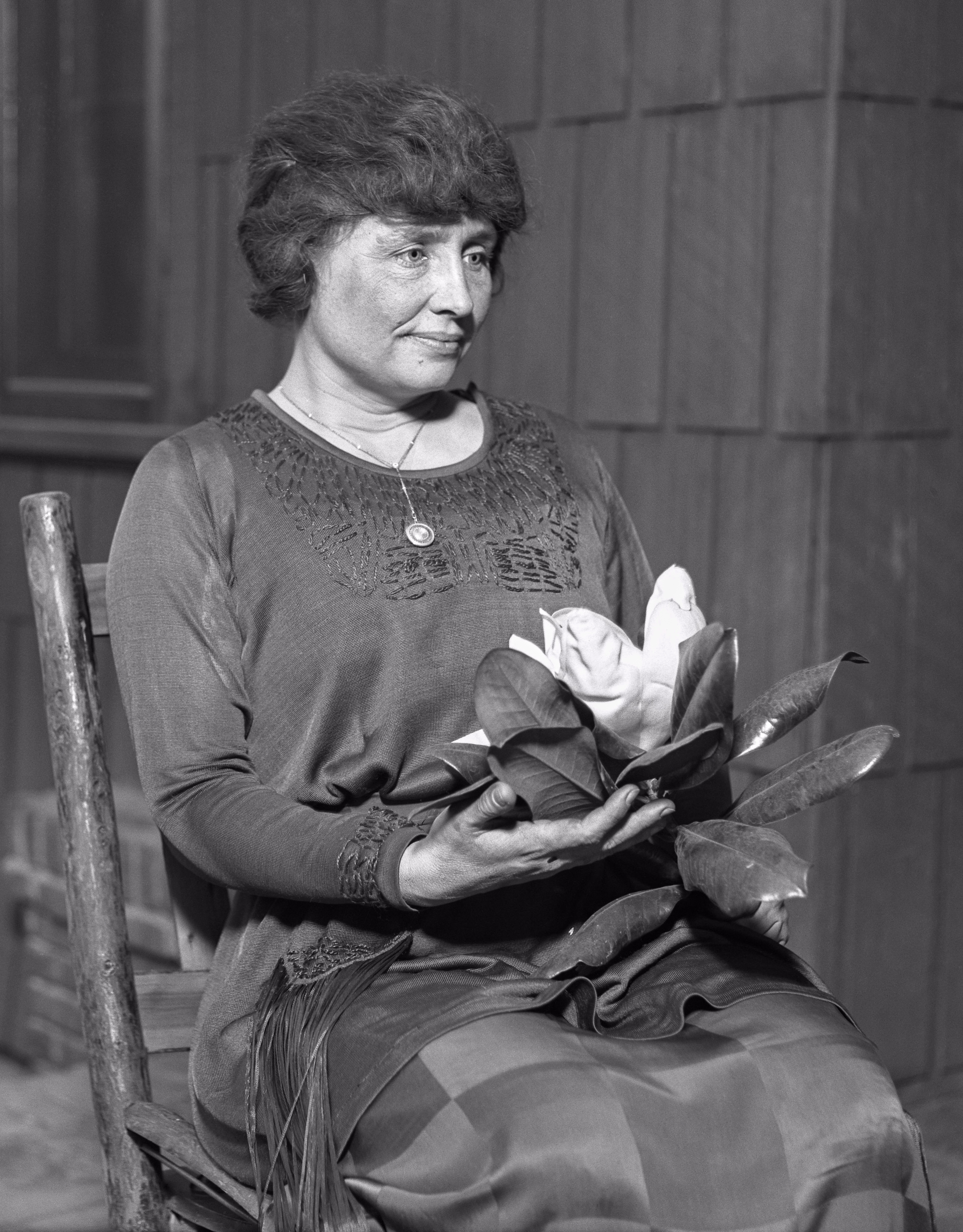
Helen Keller

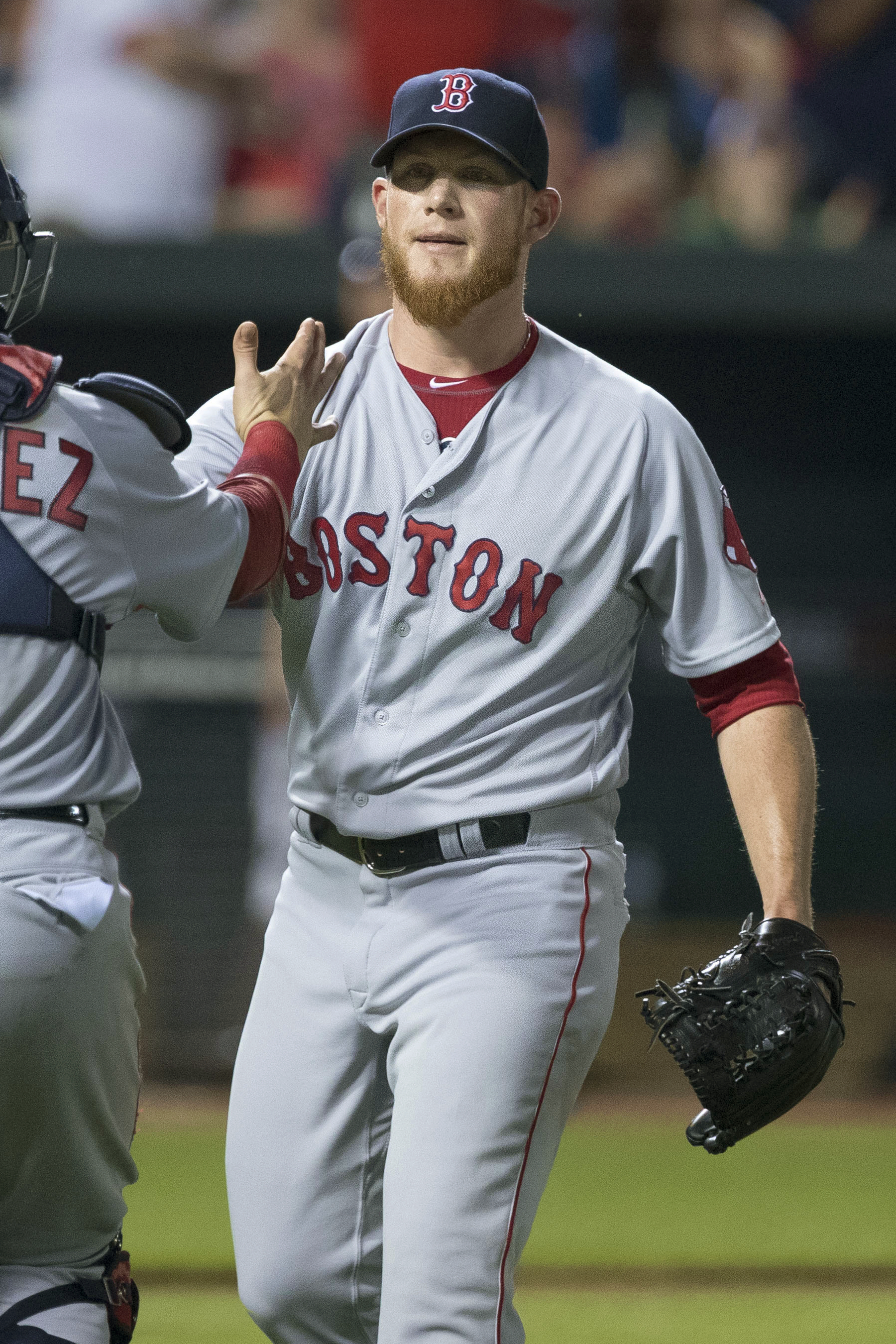
Craig Kimbrel

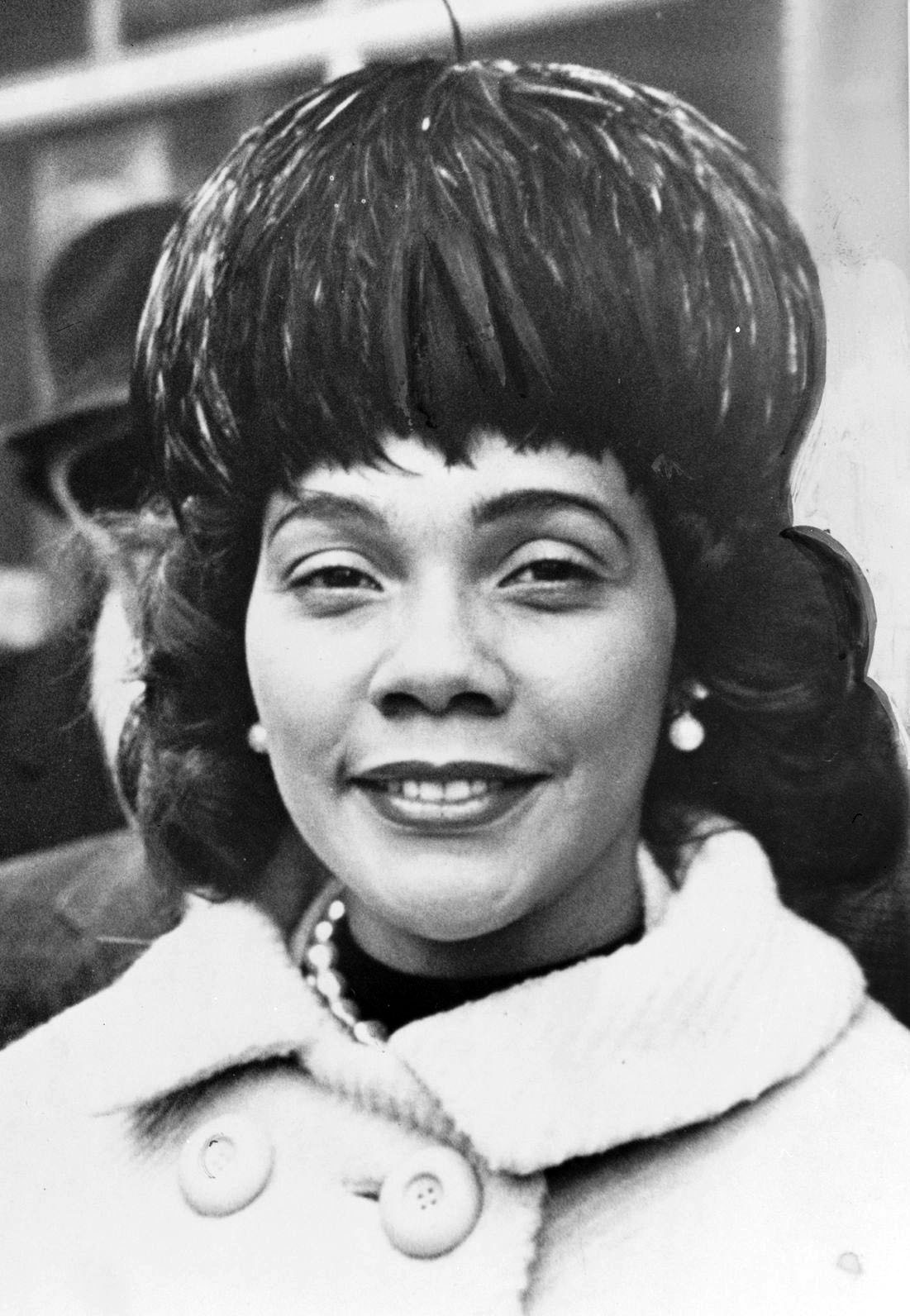
Coretta Scott King

- JJ Kaplan (born 1997), American-Israeli basketball player in the Israeli Basketball Premier League
- Kelly Kazek (born 1965 in Warner Robins, Georgia), journalist and author (high school and since, Huntsville)
- Helen Keller, author and activist (Tuscumbia)
- Eddie Kendricks, soul music singer (Union Springs)
- Annie Kennedy, educator (Centerville)
- Jimmy Key, MLB pitcher (Huntsville)
- Caitlín R. Kiernan, author (Birmingham)
- Craig Kimbrel, MLB pitcher, Atlanta Braves (Huntsville)
- Bettye Kimbrell (1936–2016), quilter (born in Berry; lived in Mount Olive, Jefferson County)
- Alveda King, minister, anti-abortion activist, author (Birmingham)
- Brandon King, NFL safety, New England Patriots (Alabaster)
- Coretta Scott King, civil rights leader (Marion)
- Martin Luther King Jr., civil rights activist, lived in Alabama in the mid-1950s (Montgomery)
- Reggie King, former NBA player (Birmingham)
- Troy King, state attorney general (2004–2011) (Montgomery)
- William R. King, United States senator from Alabama (1848–1852), 13th vice president under President Franklin Pierce (1853–1853) (born in Sampson County, North Carolina)
- Woodie King Jr., director, producer (Baldwin Springs)
- Dre Kirkpatrick, NFL cornerback, Cincinnati Bengals (Gadsden)
- Freddie Kitchens, University of Alabama quarterback, NFL head coach of Cleveland Browns (Gadsden)
- Corey Kluber, MLB pitcher, Cleveland Indians (Birmingham)
- Mathew Knowles, father of Beyoncé and Solange (Gadsden)
- Simmie Knox, painter (Aliceville)
- David Koonce, rock musician, Within Reason (Pelham)

== L ==
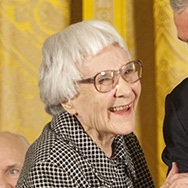
Harper Lee

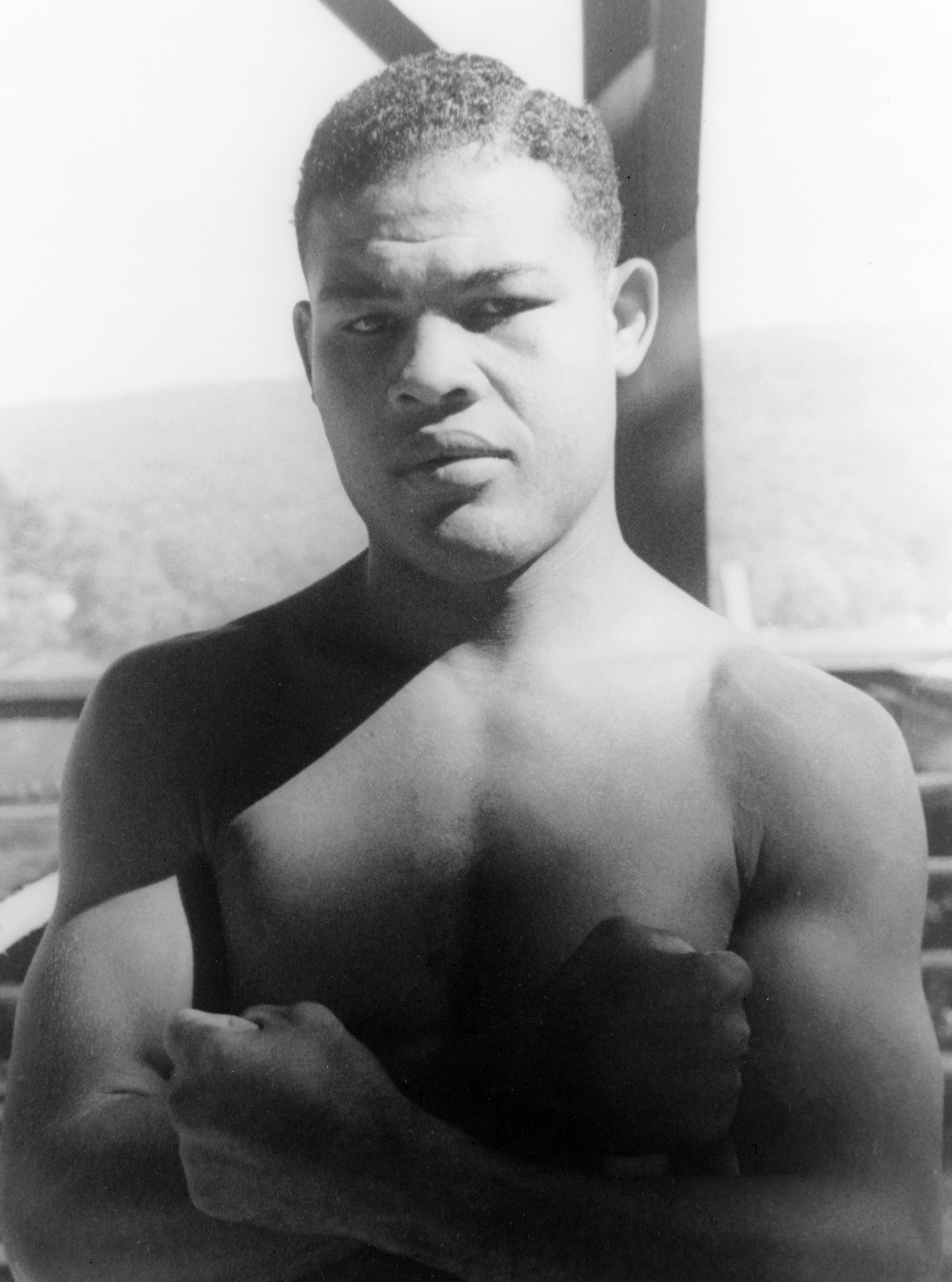
Joe Louis

- Larry Langford, former mayor of Birmingham (Birmingham)
- Adam Lazzara, singer, Taking Back Sunday (Sheffield)
- Terry Leach, MLB pitcher (Selma)
- Harper Lee, Pulitzer Prize-winning writer of To Kill a Mockingbird (Monroeville)
- Perry Lentz, author (Anniston)
- Lash LeRoux, professional wrestler, painter, artist (Oxford)
- Leon Lett, NFL defensive tackle (Fairhope)
- Carl Lewis, track and field athlete, Olympic gold medalist (Birmingham)
- David Peter Lewis, governor (1872–1874) (Huntsville)
- John Lewis, U.S. congressman, civil rights leader (Troy)
- Monte Lewis, football player (Abbeville)
- George Lindsey, actor (Jasper)
- Angela Little, model, actress, Playboy Playmate of the Month (Albertville)
- Herman H. Long, college administrator (Birmingham)
- Theodore Long, professional wrestling authority figure (Birmingham)
- Sarah Ashley Longshore, painter
- Joe Louis, boxer, 12-year world heavyweight champion (Lafayette)
- Joseph Lowery, civil rights leader (Huntsville)
- Theodore J. Lowi, political scientist (Gadsden)
- Rebecca Luker, singer and actress (Helena)
- Shelby Lynne, country music singer, born in Virginia (Frankville)

== M ==
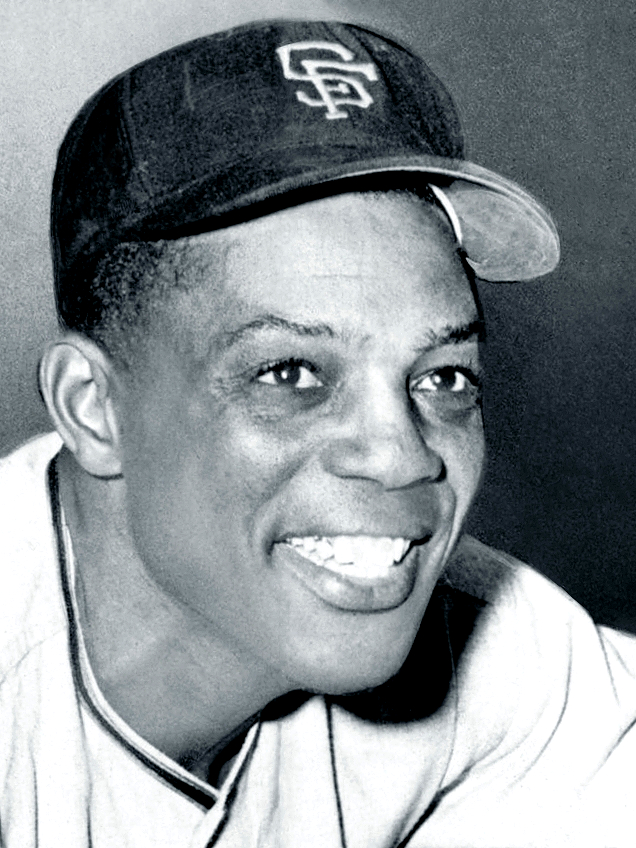
Willie Mays

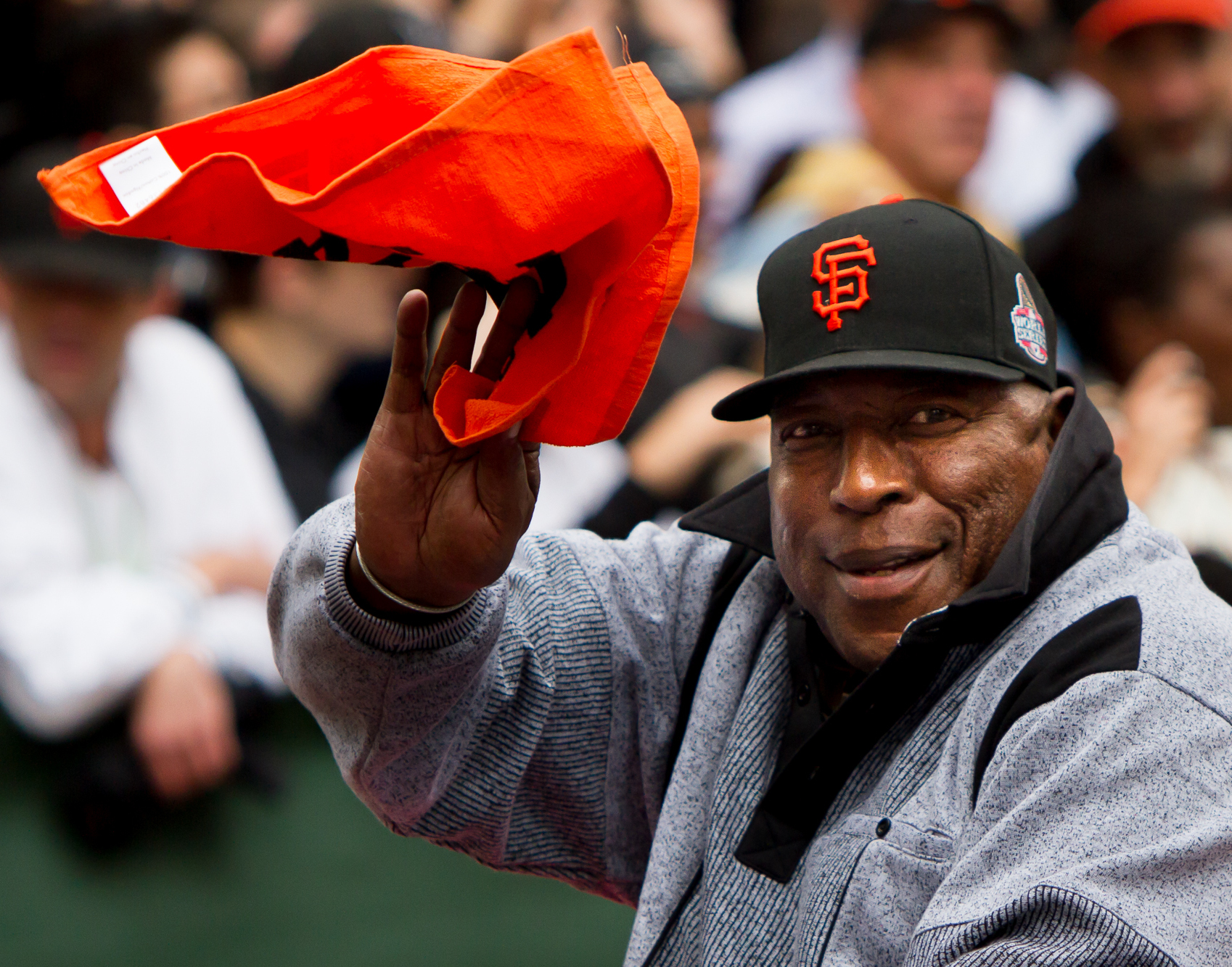
Willie McCovey

- Sunny Mabrey, model, actress (Gadsden)
- Harry Mabry, television newscaster (Birmingham)
- Everette Maddox a.k.a. "Rhett" Maddox, poet (Montgomery)
- Anthony Madison, NFL player, Pittsburgh Steelers (Thomasville)
- Boots Mallory, actress (Mobile)
- Alfred Malone, NFL player, Houston Texans (Frisco City)
- Gucci Mane, musician (Birmingham)
- William March, writer, World War I hero (Mobile)
- Sharon G. Markette, Illinois state representative, Montgomery
- Sen'Derrick Marks, NFL player, Jacksonville Jaguars (Mobile)
- Debra Marshall, WWE wrestler (Tuscaloosa)
- Kerry James Marshall, artist (Birmingham)
- Chris Martin, NFL player (Huntsville)
- Harold E. Martin, newspaperman (Montgomery)
- Hugh Martin, songwriter (Birmingham)
- James D. Martin, U.S. representative from Alabama's 7th congressional district (1965–1967) (Gadsden)
- Sonequa Martin-Green, actress (Russellville)
- F. David Mathews, educator (Grove Hill)
- Evan Mathis, NFL player, Denver Broncos (Birmingham)
- Jordan Matthews, NFL player, Philadelphia Eagles (Madison)
- Bruce Maxwell, MLB player (Huntsville)
- Kivuusama Mays, former NFL player (Anniston)
- Willie Mays, Hall of Fame center fielder (Birmingham)
- Lewis McAllister, businessman and Republican former member of the Mississippi House of Representatives (Tuscaloosa)
- Jim McBride, songwriter (Huntsville)
- Robert R. McCammon, horror writer (Birmingham)
- A. J. McCarron, football quarterback (Mobile)
- Elvin McCary, politician (Anniston)
- Antoine McClain, former NFL player (Anniston)
- Rolando McClain, NFL player, Dallas Cowboys (Athens)
- Mary Sue McClurkin, Alabama House of Representatives 1998–2014 (Abbeville)
- Mitch McConnell, politician, long-time U.S. senator from Kentucky since 1985, and Republican Leader of the United States Senate 2015–2021 (Sheffield/Athens)
- Willie McCovey, Hall of Fame first baseman (Mobile)
- Michael McCullers, screenwriter
- K. J. McDaniels, NBA player (Birmingham)
- Alexander McGillivray, Creek Indian Chief (Montgomery)
- Lachlan McGillivray, Scots-Indian trader (Montgomery)
- Garnie W. McGinty, Louisiana historian (Montevallo)
- Frank McIntyre, U.S. Army general (Montgomery)
- Ronald McKinnon, NFL player, Arizona Cardinals (Elba)
- Steve McLendon, NFL player, Pittsburgh Steelers (Ozark)
- Gertrude Michael, actress (Talladega)
- Chuckie Miller, former NFL player (Anniston)
- Don Mincher, MLB player (Huntsville)
- Grover Mitchell, jazz trombonist (Whatley)
- John Mitchell, NFL coach, Pittsburgh Steelers (Mobile)
- Anthony Mix, NFL player (Bay Minette)
- Wilmer Mizell, U.S. representative from North Carolina, Major League Baseball pitcher (Vinegar Bend)
- Jamario Moon, basketball player (Goodwater)
- Charles Moore, civil rights photojournalist (Hackleburg)
- Mal Moore, University of Alabama athletic director, former quarterback and offensive coordinator (Dozier)
- Roy Moore, chief justice of the Alabama Supreme Court (2001–2003, 2013–2016) (Gadsden)
- Thomas Hinman Moorer, admiral, U.S. Navy, chairman of the Joint Chiefs of Staff (Mount Willing)
- Kathryn Morgan, ballet dancer, former soloist with New York City Ballet
- Lamar Morris, country singer (Andalusia)
- Randall Morris, former NFL player, Seattle Seahawks (Anniston)
- C. J. Mosley, NFL player, Baltimore Ravens (Mobile)
- Eric Motley, public administrator (Montgomery)
- Morgan Murphy, humorist and author (Mountain Brook)
- Roger Murrah, songwriter, recording artist (Athens)
- Albert Murray, writer (Nokomis)
- Johnny Musso, football player (Birmingham)
- Pete Myers, basketball player and coach (Mobile)

== N ==
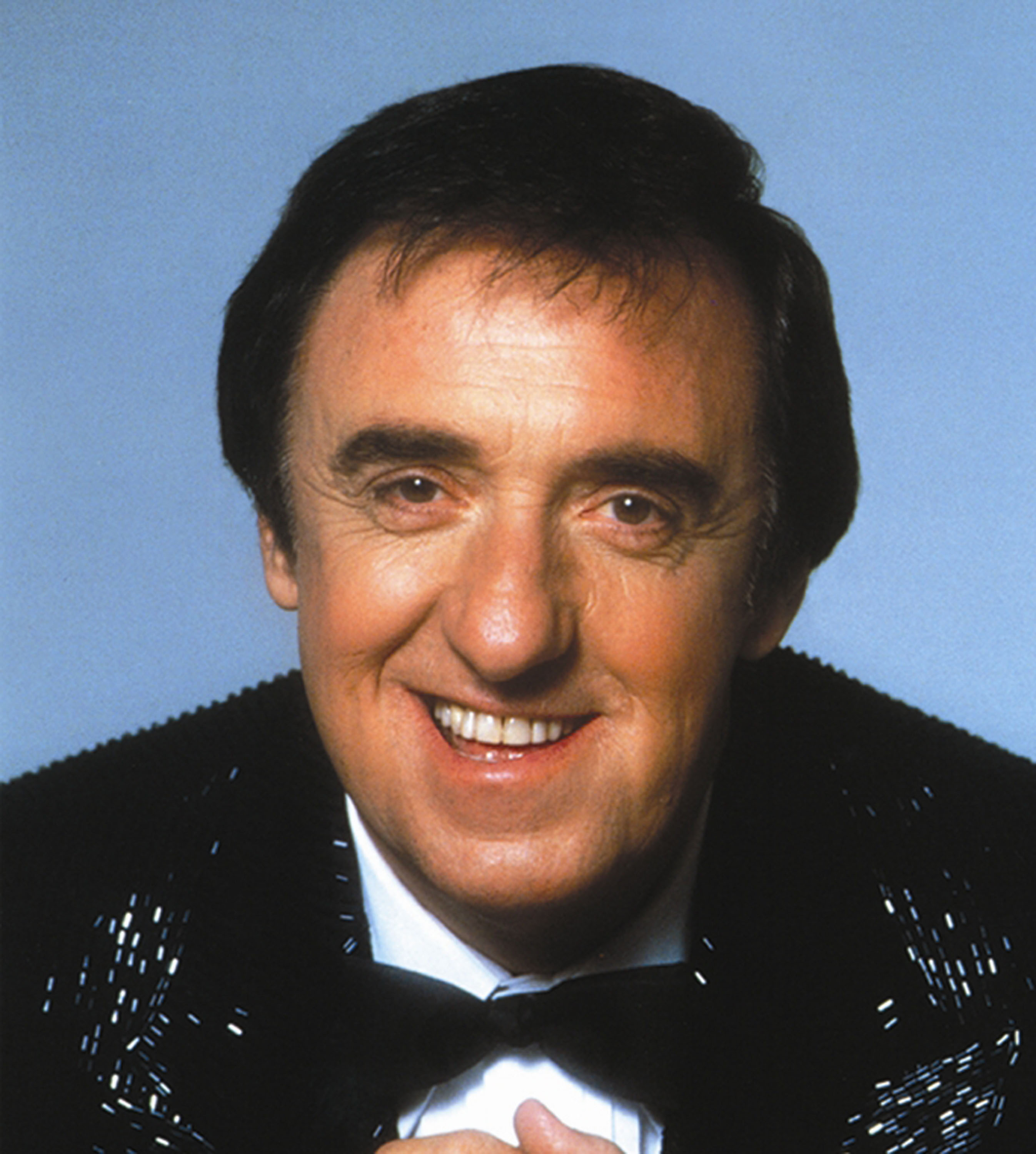
Jim Nabors

- Jim Nabors, actor and singer (Sylacauga)
- Joe Namath, Hall of Fame quarterback, Alabama and NFL player, born in Beaver Falls, Pennsylvania (Tuscaloosa)
- Siran Neal, NFL player, Buffalo Bills (Dothan)
- Larry Nelson, PGA golfer (Fort Payne)
- Bert Nettles, politician and lawyer, formerly from Monroeville and Mobile (Birmingham)
- Elijah Nevett, NFL player (Bessemer)
- Ozzie Newsome, football player, Alabama and NFL's Cleveland Browns, executive for Baltimore Ravens (Leighton)
- Matthew Newton, conductor, professional railroader (Prattville)
- Jimmy Nolen, guitarist (Roanoke)

== O ==
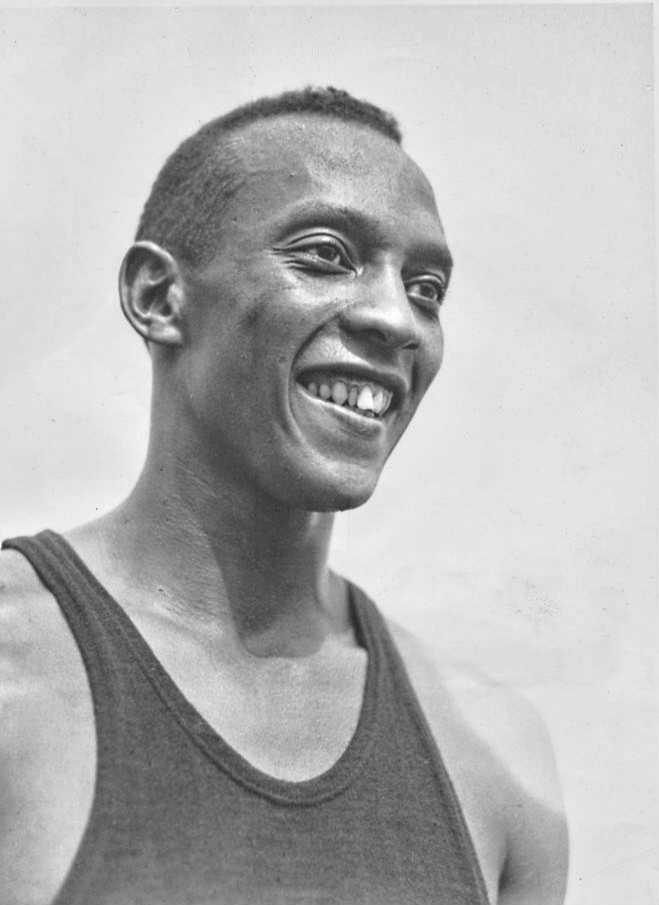
Jesse Owens

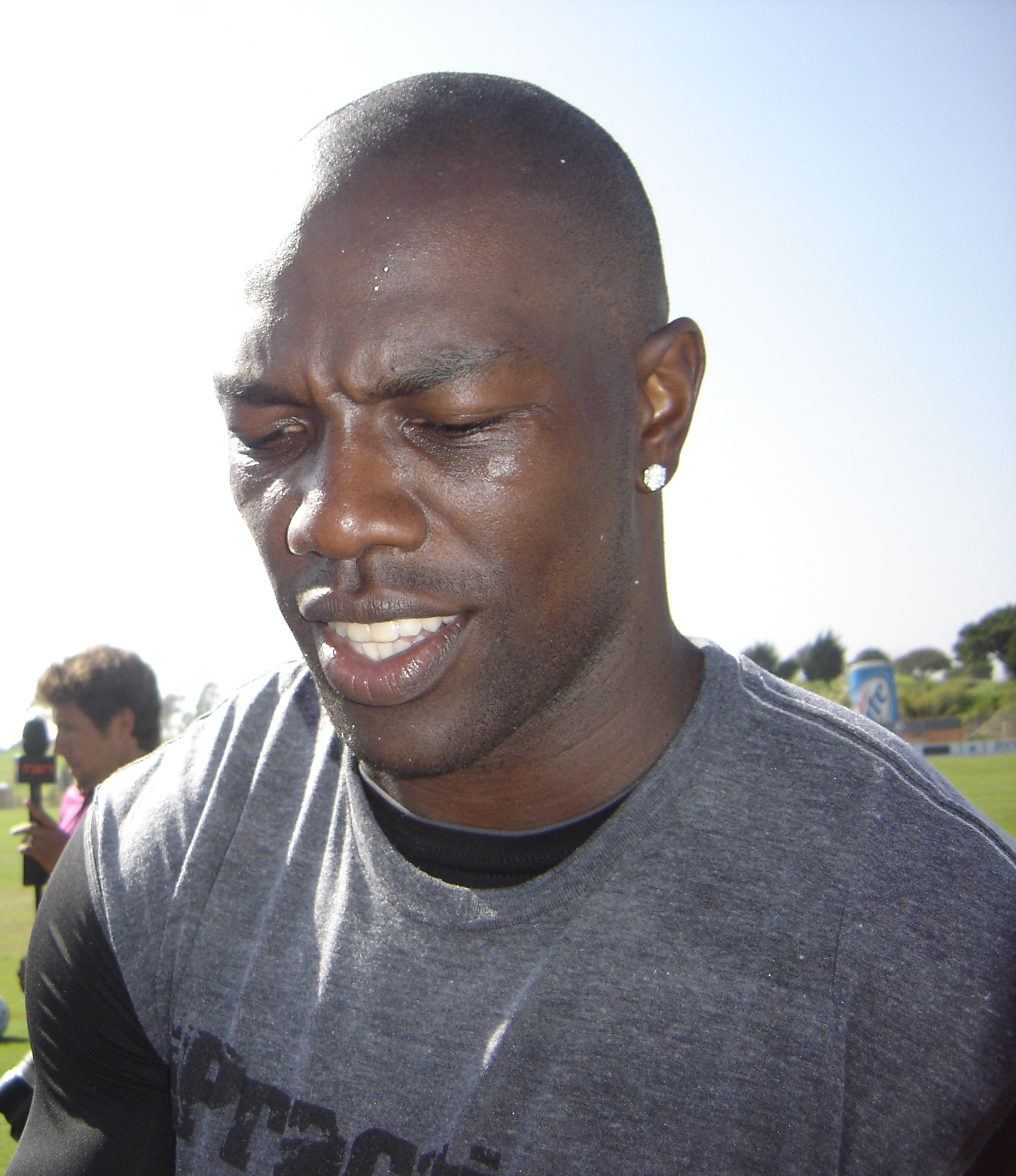
Terrell Owens

- Philip Ober, stage and screen actor (Fort Payne)
- Benjamin Obomanu, NFL player, Seattle Seahawks (Selma)
- Jeremy Oden politician, ordained minister (Vinemont, Eva)
- Scott Oden, writer (Somerville)
- Cathy O'Donnell, actress (Siluria)
- Olandria, model, television personality (Decatur)
- Spooner Oldham, songwriter, keyboardist (Center Star)
- Stan O'Neal, chairman and CEO of Merrill Lynch (Roanoke)
- Katherine Orrison, screenwriter (Anniston)
- Osceola, Seminole leader (Tallassee)
- Victoria Osteen, co-pastor of Lakewood Church (Huntsville)
- Randy Owen, lead singer for band Alabama (Fort Payne)
- Jesse Owens, iconic track and field athlete, Olympic gold medalist (Oakville)
- Terrell Owens, NFL Hall of Famer (Alexander City)
- Zac Oyama, comedian, improv actor, and writer

== P ==
- Satchel Paige, baseball player (Mobile)
- Michael Papajohn, actor, stuntman (Vestavia Hills)
- Rosa Parks, civil rights activist (Tuskegee)
- Gail Patrick, actress and television producer (Birmingham)
- Albert Patterson, attorney general of Alabama (Phenix City)
- John Malcolm Patterson, governor of Alabama (Phenix City)
- Jake Peavy, baseball pitcher (Mobile)
- Charley Pell, head football coach at Clemson and Florida (Albertville)
- Dan Penn, singer, songwriter, record producer (Vernon)
- Blake Percival, Whistleblower (Montgomery)
- Walker Percy, author (Birmingham)
- Tito Perdue, author (Anniston)
- Wayne Perkins musician (Birmingham)
- Chuck Person, NBA player (Brantley)
- Wesley Person, NBA player (Brantley)
- Jesse Lee Peterson, minister, author (Midway)
- Sidney Phillips, World War II veteran, physician (Mobile)
- George Pickens, NFL player (Hoover)
- Wilson Pickett, R&B and soul singer (Prattville)
- Juan Pierre, MLB outfielder (Mobile)
- Charles Redding Pitt, attorney, politician (Decatur)
- Adrian Pledger (born 1976), basketball player
- Willie Pless, CFL Hall of Famer, Edmonton Eskimos (Anniston)
- Nathan Poole, former NFL player (Alexander City)
- Chris Porter, NBA player (Abbeville)
- Monica Potter, actress (Arab)
- Paula Poundstone, comedian (Huntsville)
- Dan Povenmire, animator, voice actor (Mobile)
- Alma Powell, audiologist, children's author (Birmingham)
- Michael Powell, attorney and politician (Birmingham)
- Jerraud Powers, NFL player, Arizona Cardinals (Decatur)
- Jamaal Pritchett, NFL player, New York Jets (Jackson)
- Nehemiah Pritchett, NFL player, Seattle Seahawks (Jackson)
- Tyrone Prothro, football player, Alabama (Heflin)
- Jeremy Pruitt, college football coach, University of Tennessee (Rainsville)

== Q ==
- I. T. Quinn, conservationist, one of the founders of the National Wildlife Federation (Belgreen)

== R ==
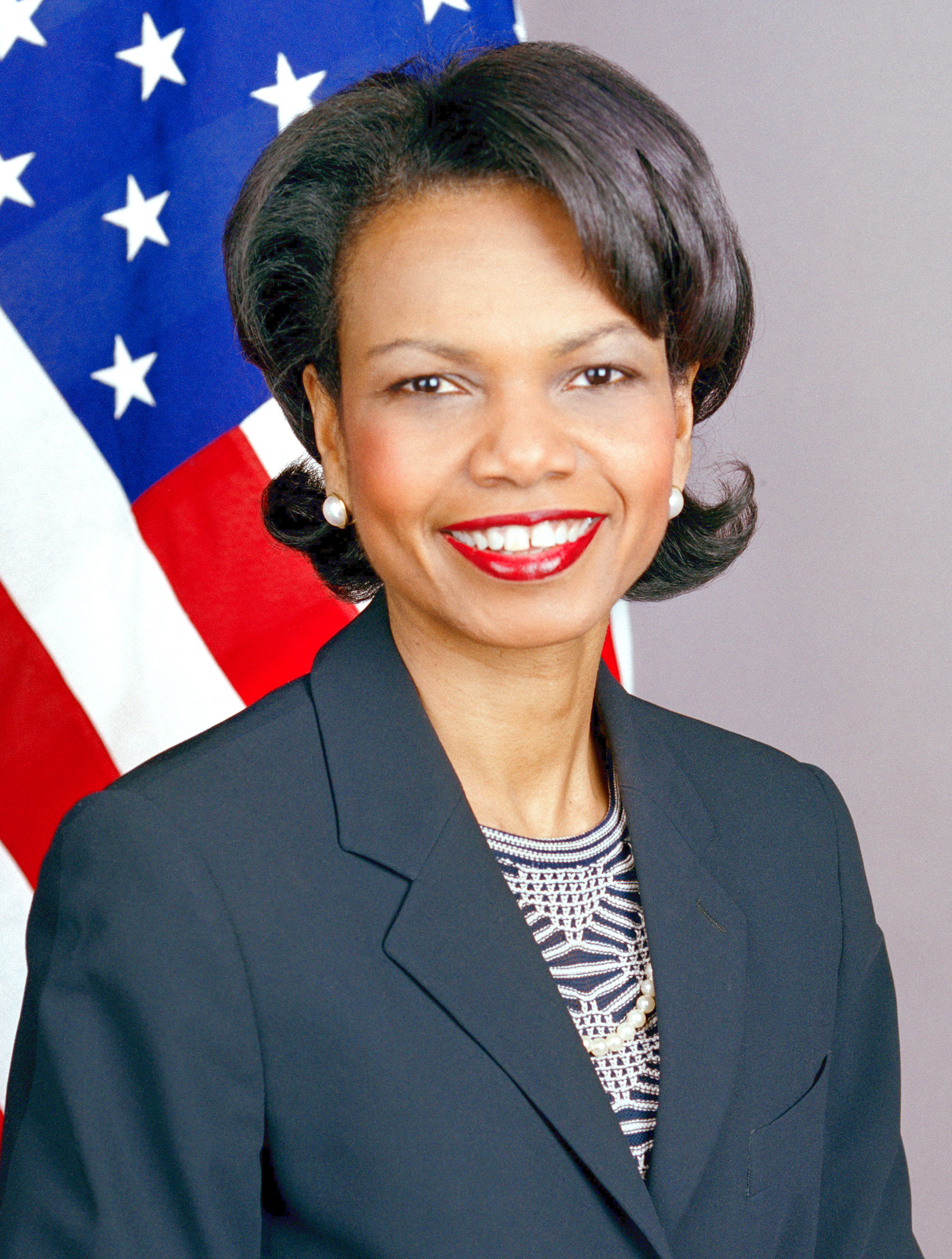
Condoleezza Rice

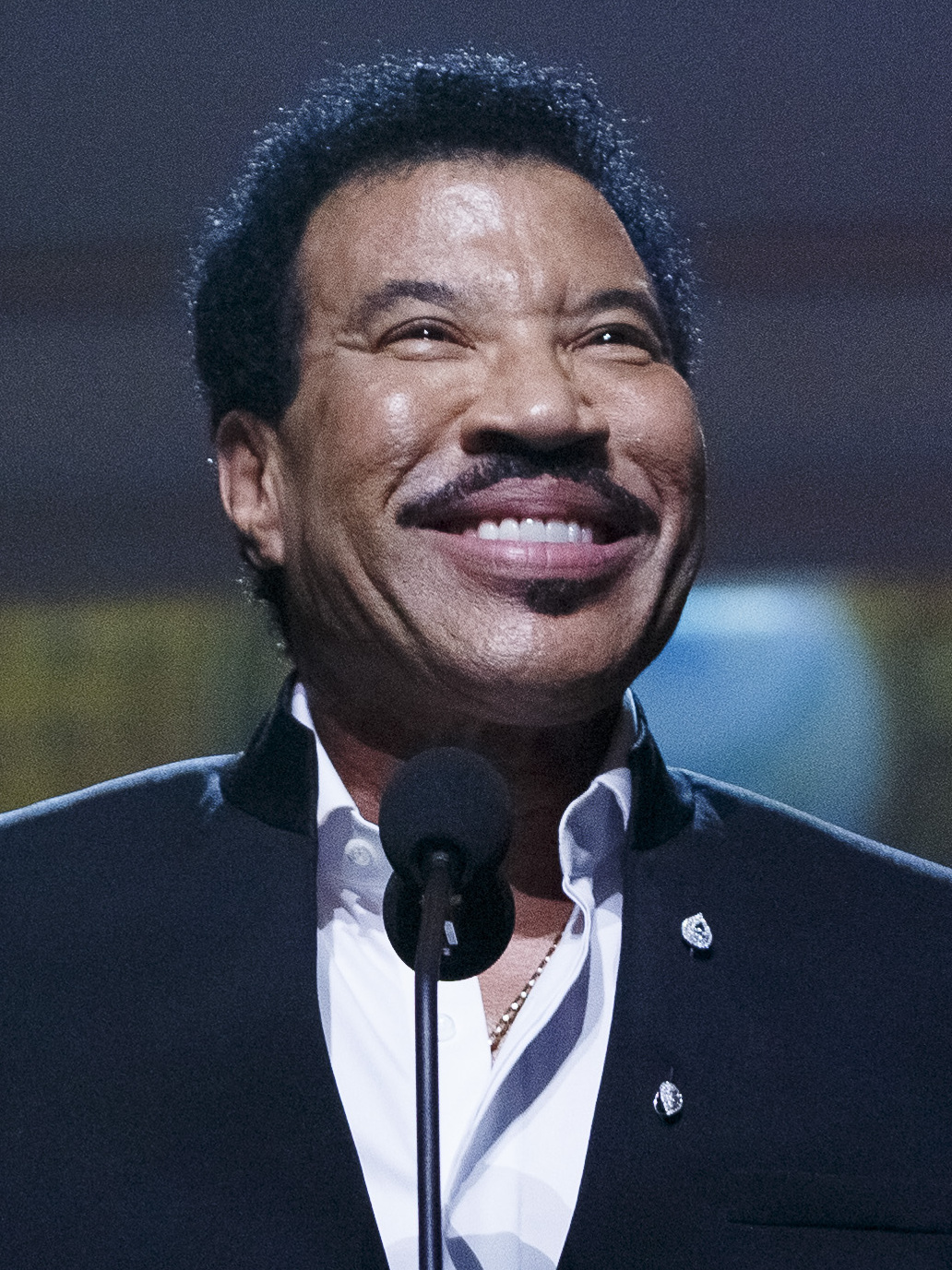
Lionel Richie

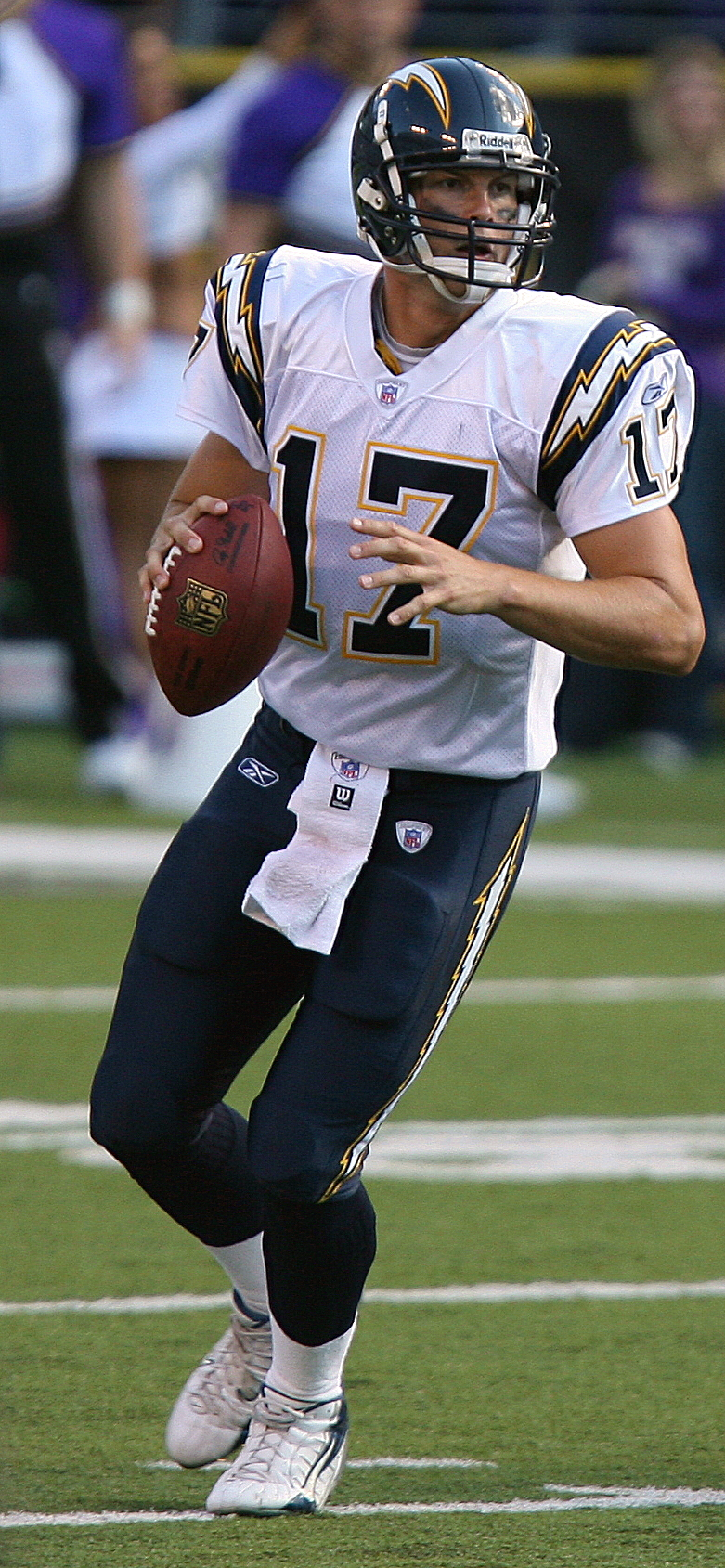
Philip Rivers

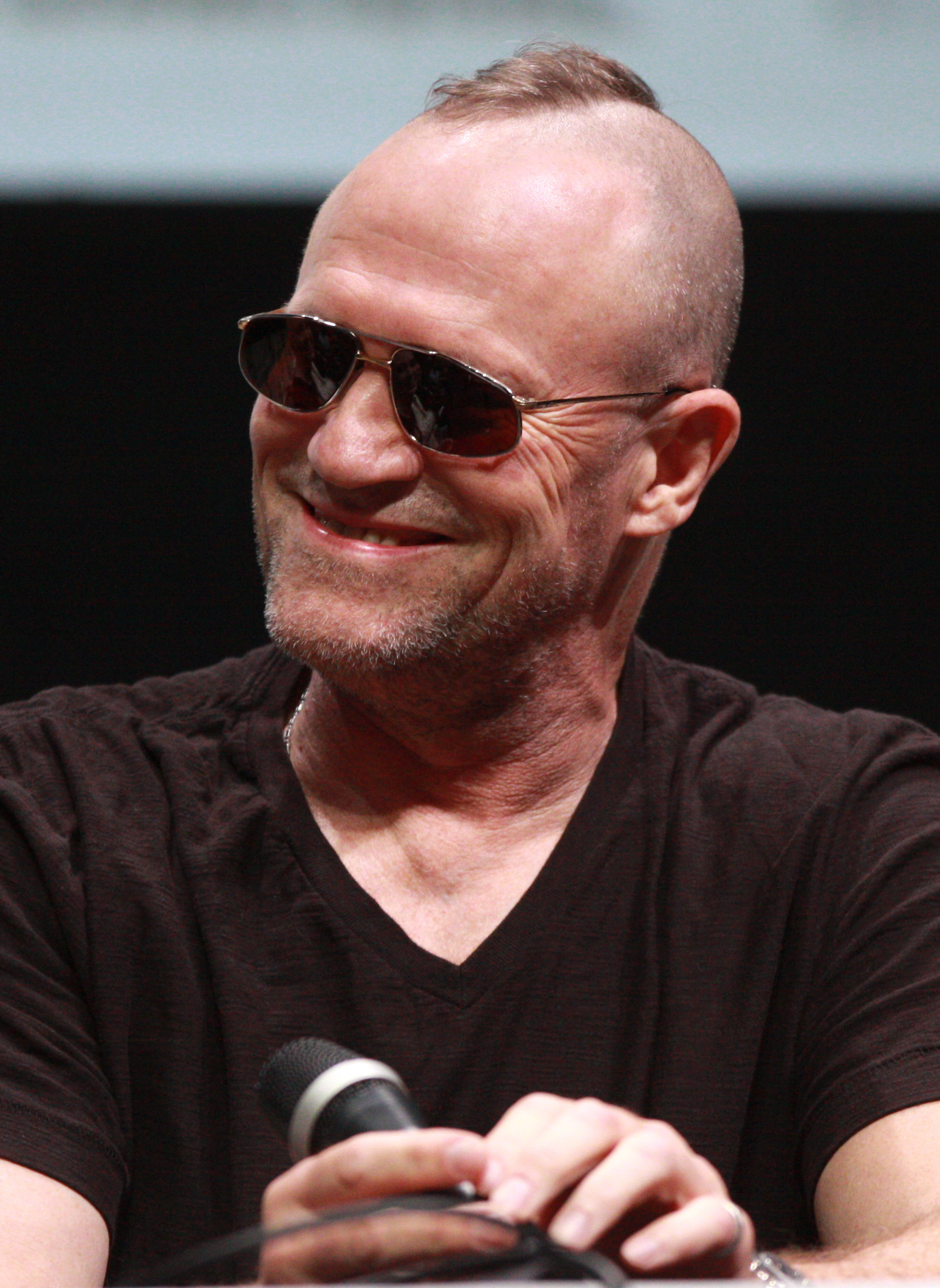
Michael Rooker

- Sun Ra, jazz musician (Birmingham)
- Sam Raben (born 1997), soccer player
- Anthony Radetic, professional water skier (Abbeville)
- Max Rafferty, California Superintendent of Public Instruction (1963–1971), education dean at Troy University (Troy)
- Thom S. Rainer, writer (Union Springs)
- Howell Raines, former New York Times editor (Birmingham)
- Albert Rains, representative of Alabama's 7th congressional district (1945–1965) (Gadsden)
- Geoff Ramsey, voice actor and producer for Rooster Teeth Productions regulation podcast(Mobile)
- LaJuan Ramsey, former NFL player (Anniston)
- Levi Randolph (born 1992), basketball player for Hapoel Jerusalem of the Israeli Basketball Premier League
- Theo Ratliff, former center for the Charlotte Bobcats (Demopolis)
- Rob Rausch, snake wrangler, television personality (Florence)
- Ray Reach, jazz pianist, vocalist, arranger, composer, music producer, director of Student Jazz Programs for the Alabama Jazz Hall of Fame (Birmingham)
- Gary Redus, baseball player (Decatur)
- Margaret Renkl, writer (Birmingham)
- Scottie Reynolds, basketball player at Villanova
- Condoleezza Rice, former United States secretary of state (Birmingham)
- Rich Boy, rapper (Mobile)
- Chris Richards, soccer player (Birmingham)
- Al Richardson, former NFL player, Atlanta Falcons (Abbeville)
- Tony Richardson, NFL player, New York Jets (Daleville)
- Lionel Richie, singer, composer, instrumentalist, producer, and four-time Grammy award winner (Tuskegee)
- Bob Riley, governor of Alabama (2003–2011) (Ashland)
- Alex Ríos, MLB outfielder (Coffee County)
- Philip Rivers, quarterback for NFL's San Diego Chargers and North Carolina State University (Decatur)
- Robin Roberts, broadcaster on ABC's Good Morning America (Tuskegee)
- David Robertson, pitcher for the New York Yankees (Birmingham)
- Denard Robinson, NFL player, Jacksonville Jaguars (Birmingham)
- Oliver Robinson, basketball player and politician (Birmingham)
- Martha Roby, representative from Alabama's 2nd congressional district (2011–2021) (Montgomery)
- Chester Rogers, NFL wide receiver (Huntsville)
- Jim Rogers, businessman, investor (Demopolis)
- Roy Rogers, former NBA player, assistant coach for the Houston Rockets (Linden)
- Wayne Rogers, actor (Birmingham)
- Michael Rooker, actor (Jasper)
- Frank Rose, educator, former president of the University of Alabama (Tuscaloosa)
- Marie Rudisill, a.k.a. "The Fruitcake Lady," Truman Capote's aunt (Monroeville)
- Council Rudolph, former NFL player (Anniston)
- Grayson Russell, actor, Diary of a Wimpy Kid (Clanton)
- Jeff Rutledge, NFL quarterback (Birmingham)
- Josh Rutledge, MLB infielder (Cullman)
- Debby Ryan, actress (Huntsville)
- DeMeco Ryans, NFL player, Philadelphia Eagles (Bessemer)

== S ==
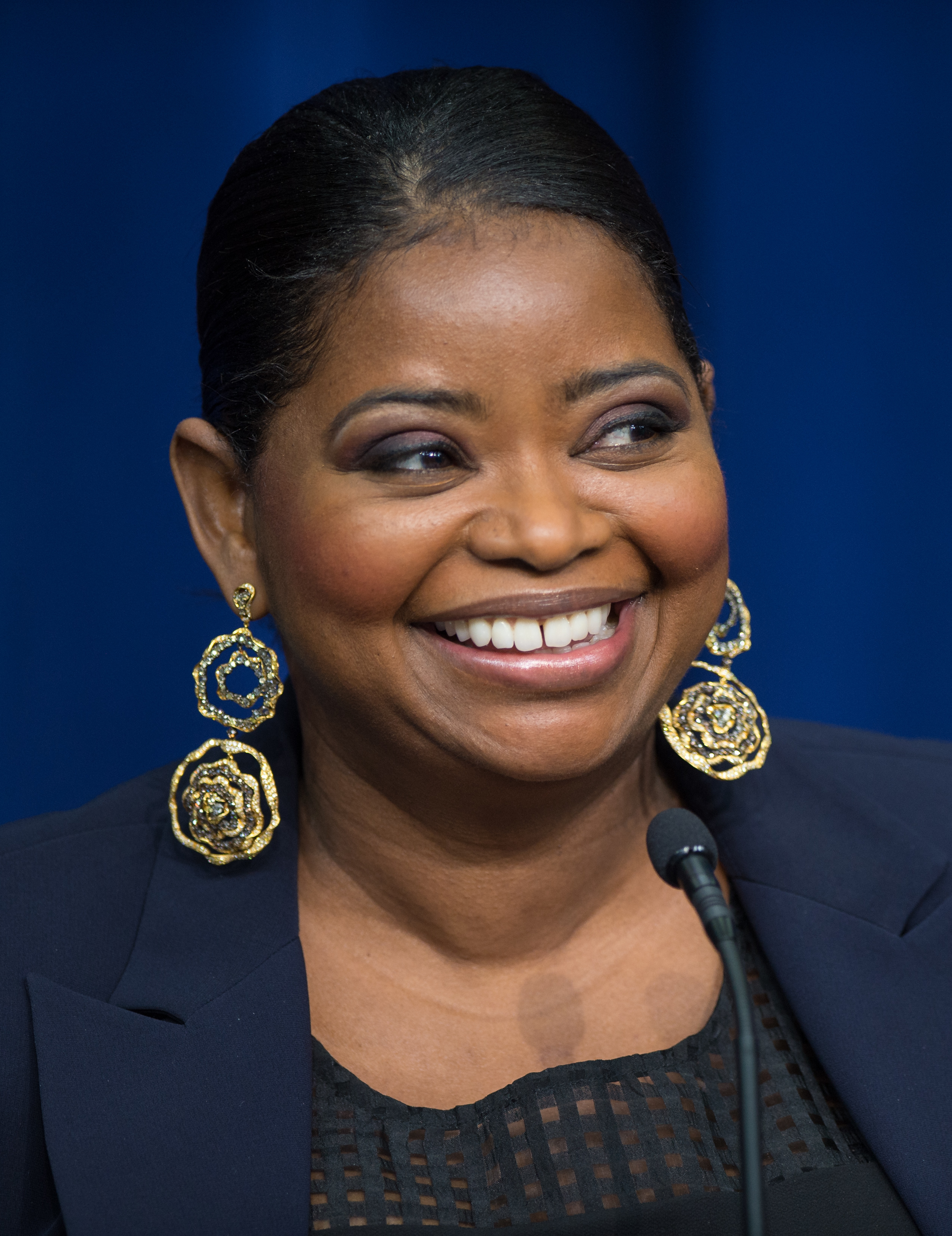
Octavia Spencer

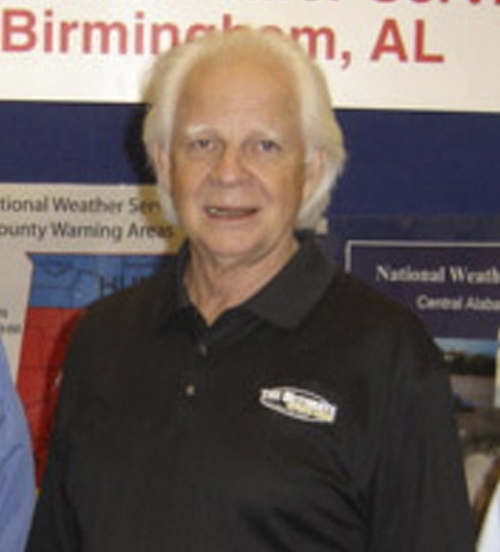
Ken Stabler

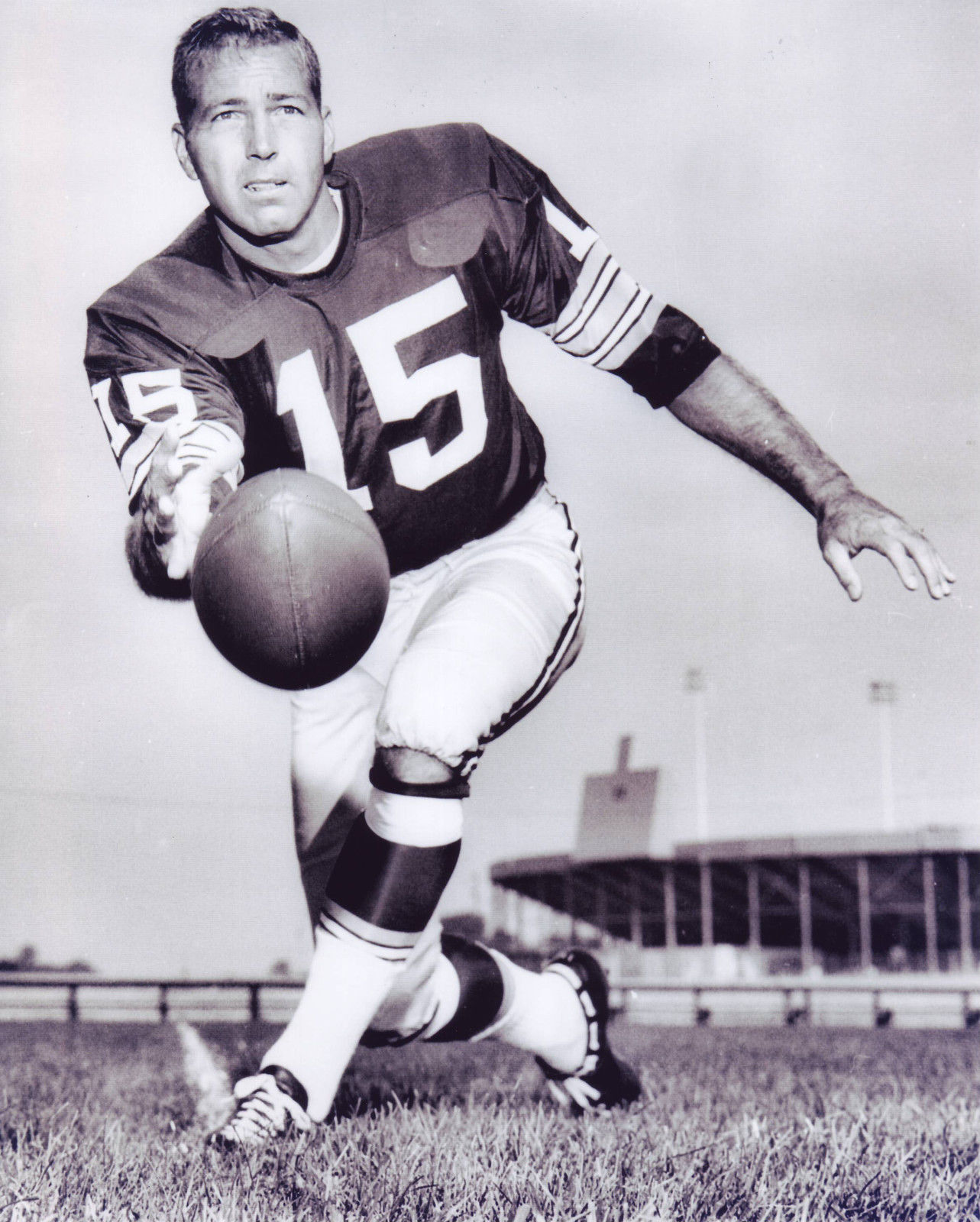
Bart Starr

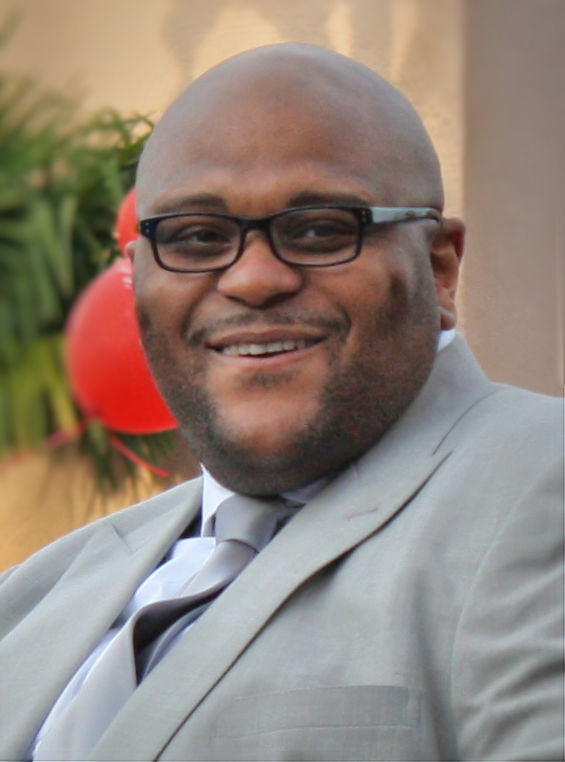
Ruben Studdard

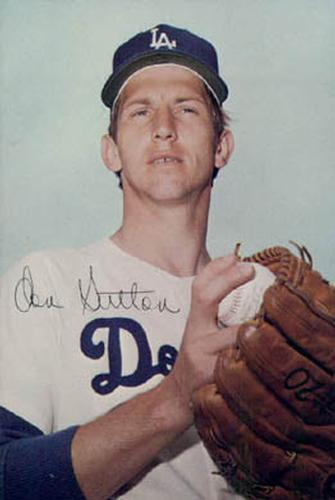
Don Sutton

- Warren St. John, author, journalist (Birmingham)
- Ed Salem, football player, born in Tucson, Arizona (Birmingham)
- Charles E. Samuels Jr., 8th director of the United States Federal Bureau of Prisons (Birmingham)
- Chris Samuels, former NFL player for Washington Redskins (Mobile)
- Sonia Sanchez, poet (Birmingham)
- Destin Sandlin, host of YouTube channel "Smarter Every Day" (Huntsville)
- John Solomon Sandridge, painter, sculptor, author, born in Gadsden (Chelsea)
- David Satcher, surgeon general of the United States, second ever and first African-America four-star admiral in United States Public Health Service Commissioned Corps (Anniston)
- Eugene Sawyer, 53rd mayor of Chicago (Greensboro)
- Bo Scarbrough, NFL player, Detroit Lions (Tuscaloosa)
- Beverly Jo Scott, singer and coach on The Voice Belgique (Deer Park)
- Richard M. Scrushy, founder and former CEO of HealthSouth (Selma)
- Doc Scurlock, a.k.a. Josiah Gordon Scurlock, a founding member of the Lincoln County New Mexico Regulators, member of Billy the Kid's gang (Tallapoosa)
- Jay Sebring, hair stylist, Charles Manson murder victim (Birmingham)
- Waldo Semon, inventor of vinyl (Demopolis)
- David Sessions, member of the Alabama Legislature (Grand Bay)
- Jeff Sessions, longtime Alabama senator 1997–2017; U.S. attorney general
- Joe Sewell, baseball player (Titus)
- Luke Sewell, baseball player (Titus)
- Rip Sewell, baseball player (Decatur)
- Glenn Shadix, actor (Bessemer)
- Earnie Shavers, former heavyweight boxer (Garland)
- Tommy Shaw, rock musician (Montgomery)
- Richard C. Shelby, United States senator (Birmingham)
- Ashton Shepherd, country singer (Coffeeville)
- Danny Sheridan, sports broadcaster and prognosticator (Mobile)
- Anis Shorrosh (1933–2018), Palestinian Evangelical Christian author, speaker, and pastor
- Fred Shuttlesworth, civil rights activist (Birmingham)
- George Siebels, mayor of Birmingham (1967–1975), state representative (1975–1990) (Birmingham)
- Don Siegelman, former governor of Alabama (1999–2003) (Mobile)
- Eugene Sledge, World War II veteran, teacher, writer (Mobile)
- Percy Sledge, soul singer (Leighton)
- Kirby Smart, football coach, defensive coordinator University of Alabama (Montgomery)
- Rickey Smiley, comedian (Birmingham)
- Albert Lee Smith Jr., representative from Alabama's 6th congressional district (1981–1983) (Birmingham)
- Andre Smith, NFL offensive lineman, Cincinnati Bengals (Birmingham)
- Ella Gaunt Smith, doll manufacturer (Roanoke)
- Holland Smith, general, United States Marine Corps during World War II, "father of amphibious warfare" (Hatchechubbie)
- Johnny Smith, jazz guitarist (Birmingham)
- Leighton W. Smith Jr., admiral, United States Navy (Mobile)
- Ozzie Smith, Hall of Fame baseball player (Mobile)
- Patrick "j.Que" Smith, songwriter (Anniston)
- Tremon Smith, NFL player, Indianapolis Colts (Saks)
- Zeke Smith, football player (Uniontown)
- Les Snead, general manager of the St. Louis Rams (Eufaula)
- Dylan Riley Snyder, actor, singer (Tuscaloosa)
- James Spann, meteorologist, podcast host (Huntsville)
- John Sparkman, United States senator (1946–1979) (Hartselle)
- Chauncey Sparks, governor (1943–1947) (Eufaula)
- Mark Spencer, president/CEO of Digium (Huntsville)
- Octavia Spencer, Academy Awards and Golden Globes award-winning actress (Montgomery)
- The Springs, band (Enterprise)
- Ken Stabler, NFL player, The University of Alabama and Oakland Raiders (Foley)
- Zac Stacy, NFL player, St. Louis Rams (Centreville)
- John Stallworth, NFL player, Pittsburgh Steelers (Tuscaloosa)
- Bart Starr, Hall of Fame football player, Alabama and Green Bay Packers (Montgomery)
- Elizabeth Willisson Stephen, writer, novelist, poet (Marengo County)
- Darian Stewart, NFL player, Denver Broncos (Huntsville)
- Donald W. Stewart, United States senator (Anniston)
- Mike Stewart, author (Vredenburgh)
- Dwight Stone, former NFL player (Florala)
- Luther Strange, attorney general of Alabama (2011–2017) (Mountain Brook)
- J. Curry Street, physicist (Opelika)
- T. S. Stribling, author (Florence)
- Gail Strickland, actress (Birmingham)
- Hut Stricklin, NASCAR driver (Calera)
- Ruben Studdard, 2003 American Idol winner (Birmingham)
- Jimmy Lee Sudduth, artist and blues musician (Fayette)
- Pat Sullivan, football player (Birmingham)
- Kevin Sumlin, football head coach, Texas A&M (Brewton)
- Don Sutton, Hall of Fame baseball player (Clio)
- Barret Swatek, actress and comedian (Birmingham)
- Sylvia Swayne, politician and first openly transgender candidate in Alabama (Montgomery)
- Ward Swingle, jazz arranger and composer (Mobile)
- Dabo Swinney, football head coach, Clemson (Pelham)

== T ==
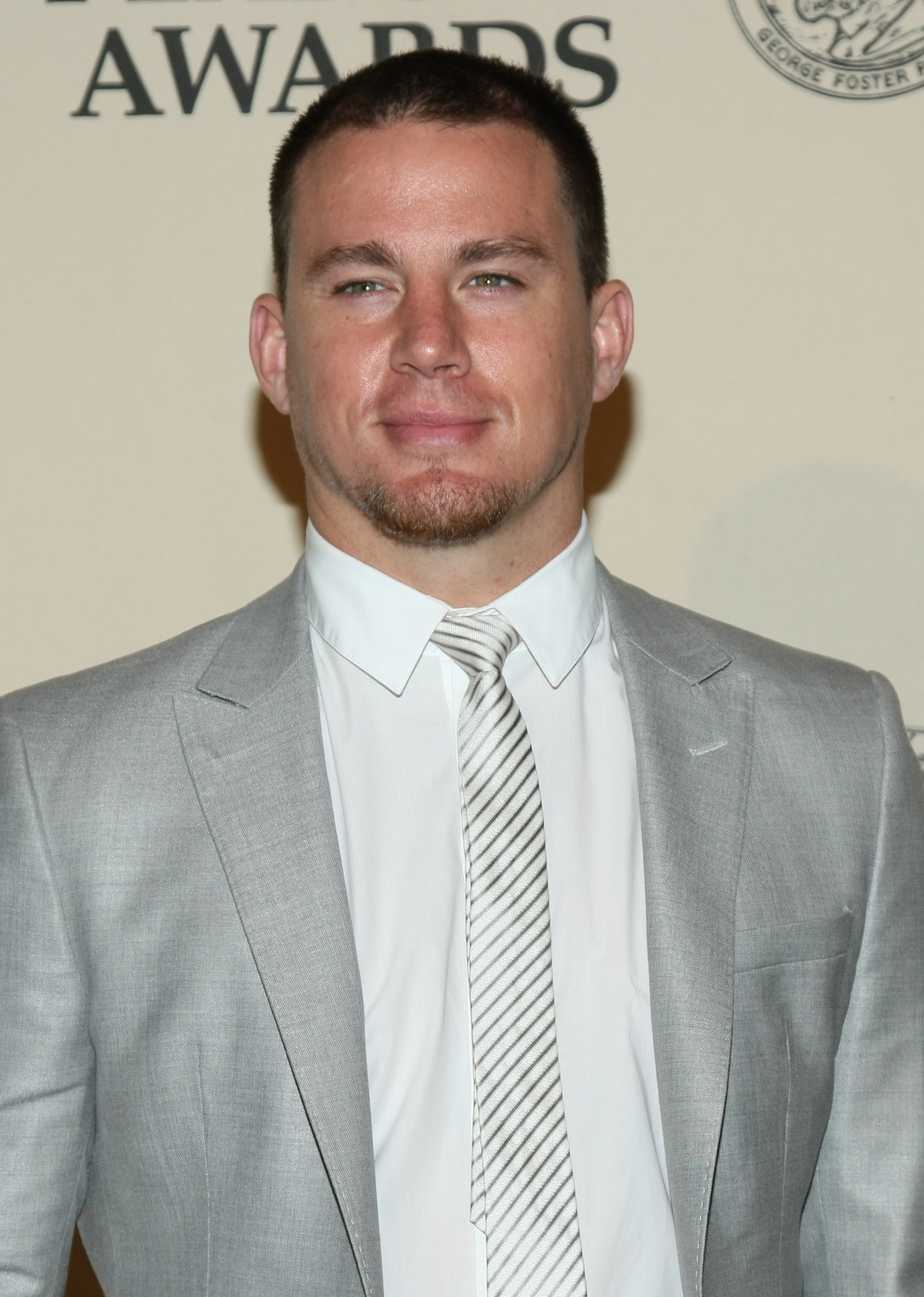
Channing Tatum

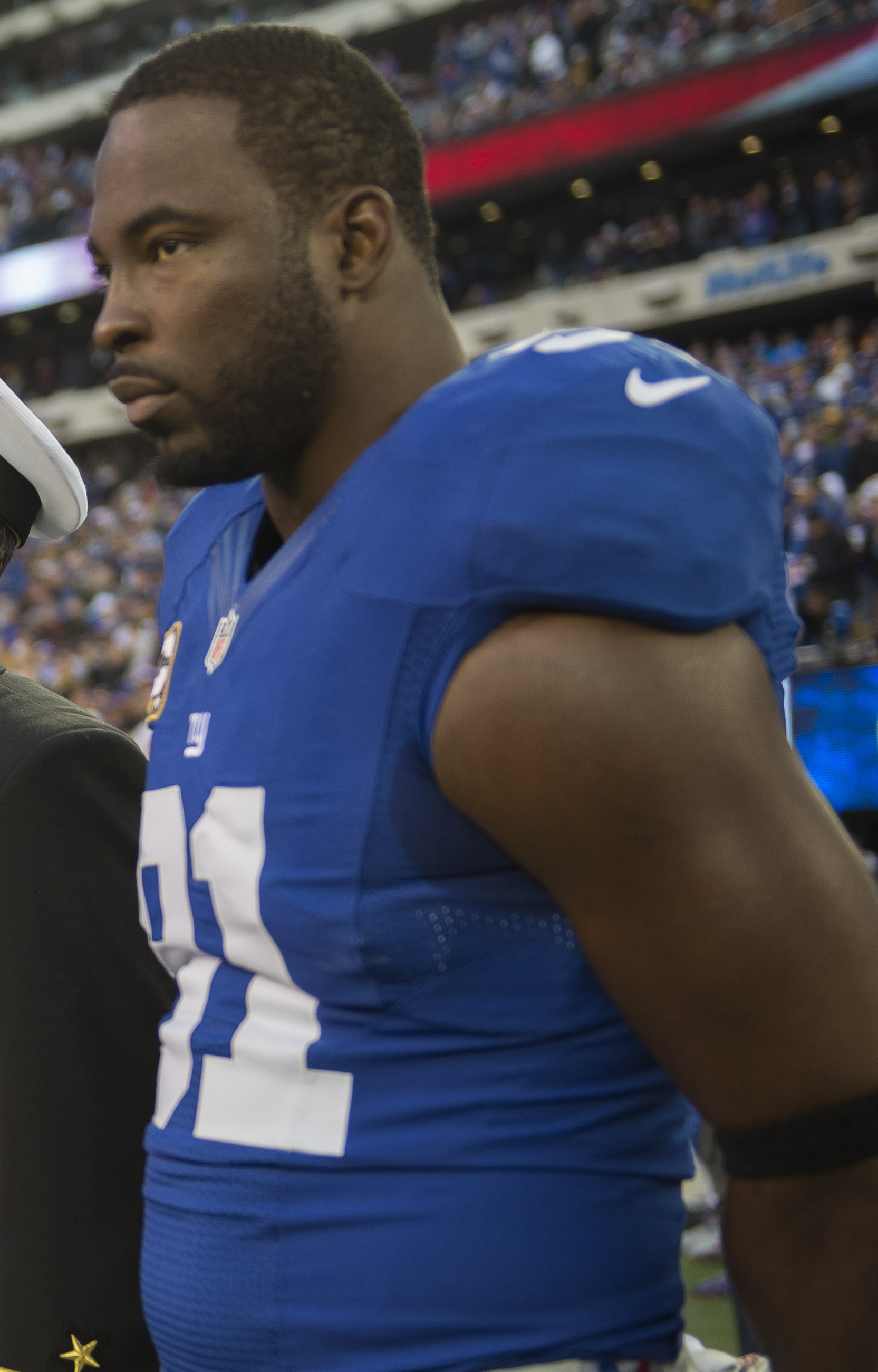
Justin Tuck

- Tua Tagovailoa, NFL player, Miami Dolphins (Alabaster)
- Jaquiski Tartt, NFL football player (Mobile)
- Channing Tatum, actor (Cullman)
- Toni Tennille, singer of the duo Captain and Tennille (Montgomery)
- Adalius Thomas, NFL football player (Equality)
- Bryan Thomas, football player (Birmingham)
- Fred Thompson, former United States senator from Tennessee, actor (Sheffield)
- Fresco Thompson, former major league baseball player and executive
- Myron Herbert Thompson, senior United States district judge
- Neil Thrasher, country singer-songwriter (Birmingham)
- Carson Tinker, NFL player, Jacksonville Jaguars (Decatur)
- Frank Tipler, mathematical physicist and cosmologist (Andalusia)
- Andre Tippett (born 1959), NFL Hall of Fame football player (Birmingham)
- Mose Tolliver, artist (Pike Road)
- Harry Townes, actor (Huntsville)
- Pat Trammell, Alabama Crimson Tide football player, physician (Scottsboro)
- William Barret Travis, commander of the Alamo at San Antonio, Texas (Claiborne)
- Jack Treadwell, World War II Medal of Honor winner (Ashland)
- Trinity the Tuck, RuPaul's Drag Race All Stars winner
- Justin Tuck, NFL football player (Kellyton)
- Cynthia Tucker, columnist and editor (Monroeville)
- Joe Turnham, chairman of the Alabama Democratic Party (2005–2011) (Auburn)
- Tom Turnipseed, Democratic political activist (Mobile)
- Chief Tuskaloosa, Creek Indian chief and leader
- Richard Tyson, actor (Mobile)

== U ==
- P. W. Underwood, football player and college coach (Cordova)
- Courtney Upshaw, NFL player, Atlanta Falcons (Eufaula)

== V ==
- Robert J. Van de Graaff, engineer, physicist (Tuscaloosa)
- Robert Smith Vance, federal judge (Talladega)
- Ed Vaughn, Michigan House of Representatives 1979–1980, 1995–2000 (Abbeville)
- Ned Vaughn, actor (Huntsville)
- Mack Vickery, singer, songwriter (Town Creek)
- Scottie Vines, former NFL player (Alexander City)
- Wernher von Braun, engineer, physicist (Huntsville) born in Wirsitz, Province of Posen, Poland (then part of German Empire)
- Hans A. von Spakovsky, attorney (Huntsville)

== W ==
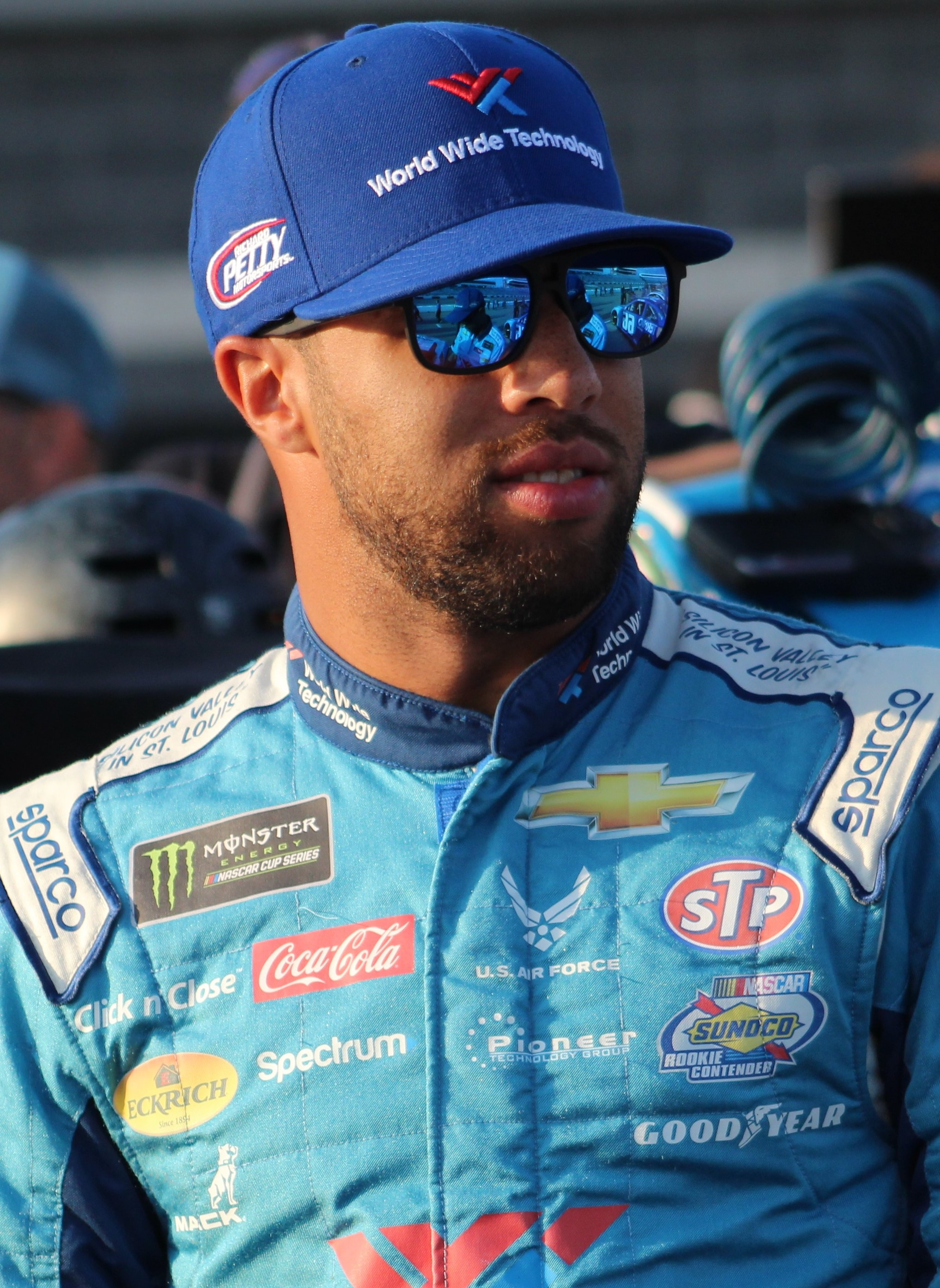
Bubba Wallace

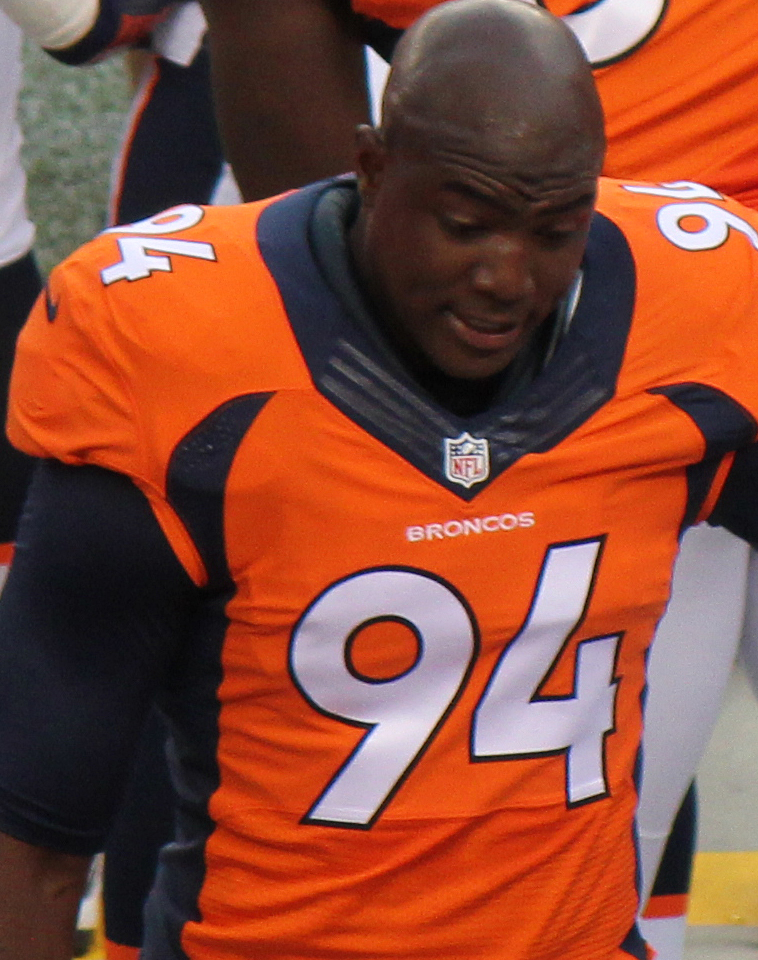
DeMarcus Ware

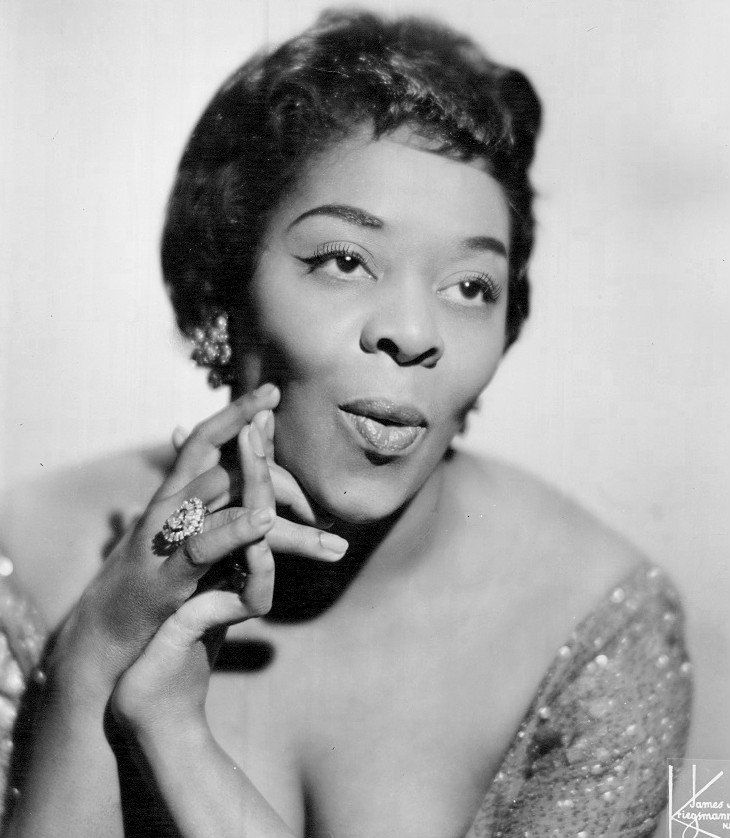
Dinah Washington

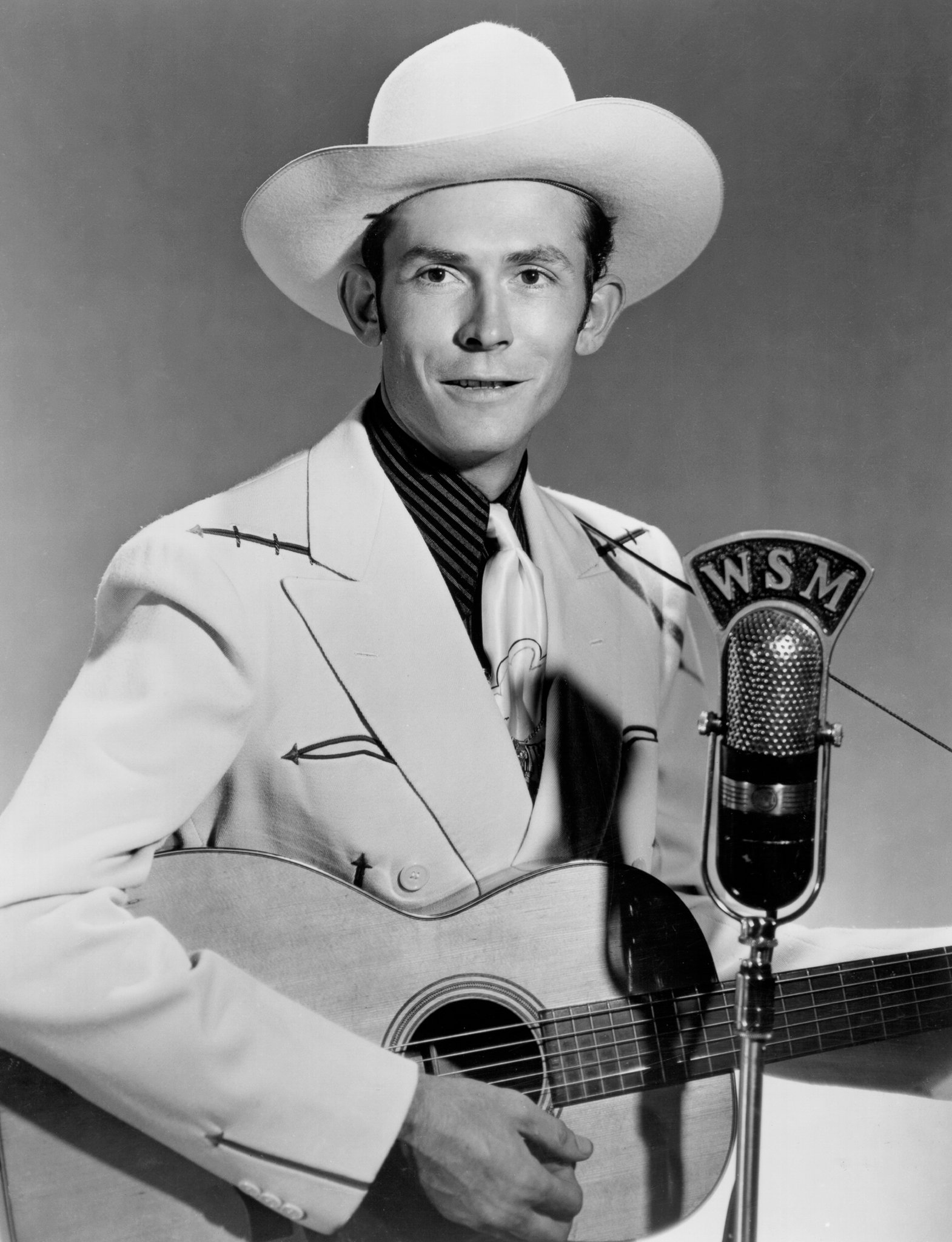
Hank Williams

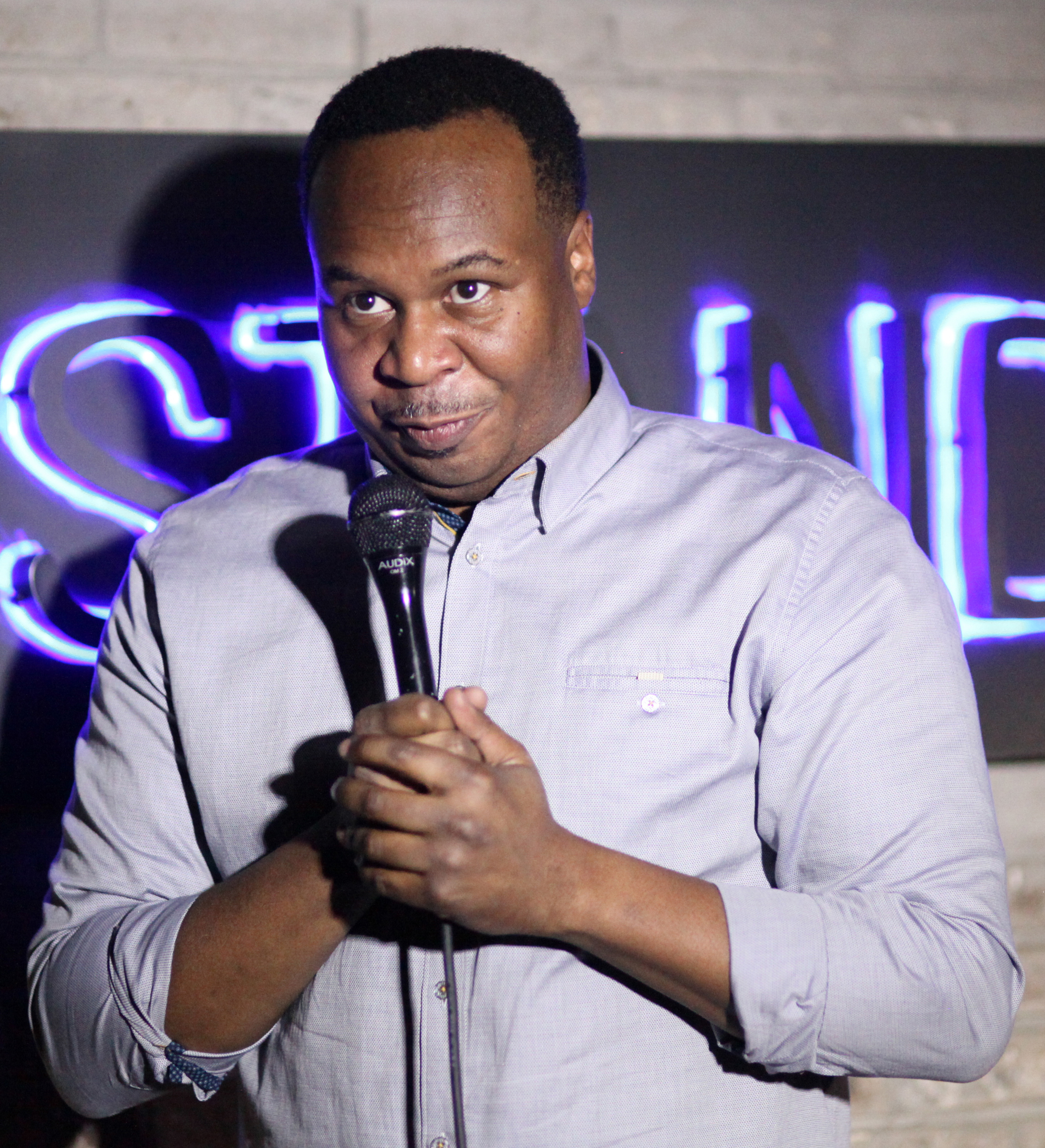
Roy Wood Jr.

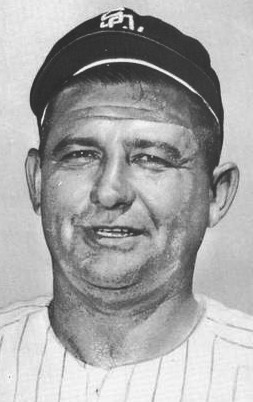
Early Wynn

- Mark Waid, writer (Hueytown)
- Jimmy Wales, co-founder of Wikipedia (Huntsville)
- Frank Walker, NFL player, Dallas Cowboys (Tuskegee)
- Margaret Walker, poet, author (Birmingham)
- Ben Wallace, NBA player (White Hall)
- Bubba Wallace, NASCAR driver (Mobile)
- Cornelia Wallace, second wife of George C. Wallace, First Lady of Alabama (1971–1978) (Montgomery)
- Daniel Wallace, writer (Birmingham)
- George C. Wallace, four-term governor and four-time presidential candidate (Clio and Montgomery)
- George Wallace Jr., former Alabama Public Service Commission member (Montgomery)
- Gerald Wallace, basketball player (Childersburg)
- Lurleen Burns Wallace, governor (1967–1968) (Montgomery)
- Eugene Walter, writer-actor (Mobile)
- Jimmie Ward, NFL player, San Francisco 49ers (Mobile)
- Kevin Ward, songwriter (Anniston)
- DeMarcus Ware, NFL player, Denver Broncos (Auburn)
- Adam Warren, MLB pitcher, New York Yankees (Birmingham)
- Mervyn Warren, musician (Huntsville)
- Dinah Washington, singer (Tuscaloosa)
- Mary Burke Washington, economist (Tuskegee)
- Ken Watters, jazz trumpeter (Huntsville)
- William Weatherford, a.k.a. Red Eagle, Creek Indian leader
- Joe Webb, NFL player, Carolina Panthers (Birmingham)
- Katherine Webb, model, Miss Alabama USA (Montgomery)
- Lardarius Webb, NFL player, Baltimore Ravens (Opelika)
- Fred Wesley, musician (Mobile)
- Mario West, NBA player, Atlanta Hawks (Huntsville)
- Joseph Wheeler, Confederate and US Ggneral, US congressman, namesake of Wheeler State Park and Wheeler National Wildlife Refuge, author (Hillsboro)
- Chris White, NFL player, Buffalo Bills (Mobile)
- D. J. White, NBA player, Charlotte Bobcats (Tuscaloosa)
- Pat White, NFL player, Miami Dolphins (Daphne)
- Heather Whitestone, 1995 Miss America (Dothan)
- Chase Whitley, MLB player, New York Yankees (Ranburne)
- Joe Whitt Jr., NFL coach, Green Bay Packers (Auburn)
- Barbara Wiedemann, poet and English professor (Montgomery)
- Deontay Wilder, professional boxer (Tuscaloosa)
- Austin Wiley (born 1999), basketball player for Hapoel Jerusalem of the Israeli Basketball Premier League
- Oliver C. Wiley, U.S. Representative (Troy)
- Mark Wilkerson, musician (Enterprise)
- Billy Williams, Hall of Fame baseball player (Mobile)
- Carnell Williams, NFL player, Tampa Bay Buccaneers (Attalla)
- Cootie Williams, jazz trumpeter (Mobile)
- Hank Williams, country musician (Georgiana)
- Hank Williams Jr., country musician (Cullman)
- Holly Williams, country musician (Cullman)
- JaCorey Williams (born 1994), basketball player for Hapoel Jerusalem of the Israeli Basketball Premier League
- Lee Williams, professional golfer (Alexander City)
- Nick Williams, NFL player, Kansas City Chiefs (Birmingham)
- Paul Williams, soul singer (Birmingham)
- Josh Willingham, MLB left fielder, Kansas City Royals (Florence)
- James Willis, former NFL linebacker (Huntsville)
- E. O. Wilson, biologist and writer (Birmingham)
- Martha Loftin Wilson, missionary worker, educator (Clarke County)
- Kathryn Tucker Windham, storyteller and author (Dallas County)
- Jameis Winston, NFL quarterback, Heisman Trophy winner (Bessemer)
- Reynolds Wolf, meteorologist (Jemison)
- Tobias Wolff, author (Birmingham)
- Roy Wood Jr., stand-up comedian (Birmingham)
- Ray Woodard, "father of soccer in Alabama" (Pelham)
- Tricia Woodgett, screenwriter (Anniston)
- Mark Woodyard, MLB pitcher, Detroit Tigers (Mobile)
- Wesley Wright, MLB pitcher, Baltimore Orioles (Montgomery)
- Tammy Wynette, country singer (Red Bay)

== Y ==
- YBN Nahmir, rapper (Birmingham)
- Yelawolf, rapper (Gadsden)
- T. J. Yeldon, running back (Daphne)
- Byron York, conservative political columnist (Birmingham)
- Tom York, television personality (Hoover)
- Coleman Young, former mayor of Detroit, Michigan (Tuscaloosa)
- Delmon Young, baseball player (Montgomery)
- Martevious Young, football player (Alexander City)

== Z ==
- John Zimmerman, professional pair skater and coach (Birmingham)

== See also ==
By location

- List of people from Birmingham, Alabama
- List of people from Demopolis, Alabama
- List of people from Gadsden, Alabama
- List of people from Huntsville, Alabama
- List of people from Mobile, Alabama
- List of people from Montgomery, Alabama
- List of people from Selma, Alabama
- List of people from Tuskegee, Alabama

Other

- Alabama Academy of Honor
- List of Alabama suffragists
