= Walter Williams =

Walter, Walt or Wally Williams may refer to:

== Arts and entertainment ==
- Walter Heath Williams, Victorian landscape artist
- Walter Williams (painter) (1834–1906), Victorian landscape painter
- Dootsie Williams or Walter Williams (1911–1991), American record executive and producer
- Walter H. Williams (1920–1998), American-born artist, painter, printmaker, and sculptor
- Bill Maynard or Walter Frederick George Williams (1928-2018), British comedian and actor
- Walter Williams, member of the O'Jays
- Walter Jon Williams (born 1953), American science fiction writer
- Walter Williams (comedian filmmaker), Saturday Night Live writer who created Mr. Bill
- Zelooperz or Walter Williams (born 1993), American rapper

== Sports ==
=== American football ===
- Walt Williams (cornerback) (born 1954), American football player
- Wally Williams (American football) (born 1971), American football player
- Walter Williams (running back) (born 1977), American football player

=== Other sports ===
- Pop Williams (Walter Merrill Williams, 1874–1959), American baseball player
- Wal Williams (1904–1982), Australian rules footballer for Hawthorn
- Jack Williams (footballer, born 1906) (Walter John Williams, 1906–1982), English footballer
- Sam Williams (basketball, born 1924) (Walter Williams, 1924–2012), American college basketball coach
- Wally Williams (water polo) (1921–2009), New Zealand water polo player
- Walt Williams (baseball) (1943–2016), American MLB player
- Walter Ray Williams Jr. (born 1959), American bowler
- Walt Williams (basketball) (born 1970), American basketball player
- Walter Williams (footballer) (1983–2018), Honduran footballer
- Walt Williams (athlete) (born 1985), Grenadian track and field athlete
- Walter Williams (rugby union) (1943–1985), Welsh rugby union international

== Other people ==
- Walter Williams (centenarian) (1842–1959), American who claimed to be the last surviving veteran of the American Civil War
- Walter Williams (journalist) (1864–1935), American who founded the Missouri School of Journalism
- Walter McAdoo Williams (1891–1959), North Carolina textile executive
- Walter B. Williams, American politician
- Walter C. Williams (1919–1995), American engineer
- Dub Williams (Walter C. Williams, 1927–2014), American politician
- Walter E. Williams (1936–2020), American economist
- Walter Lee Williams (born 1948), American academic and FBI Ten Most Wanted fugitive
