= Jack Williams =

Jack Williams may refer to:

== Politics ==
- Jack Williams (American politician) (1909–1998), American politician and Governor of Arizona
- Jack D. Williams, American politician in Birmingham, Alabama
- Jack W. Williams (politician), American politician in Wilmer, Alabama
- Jack Williams (New Zealand politician) (1919–1975), New Zealand politician of the Labour Party
- Jack Williams (socialist activist) (1854–1917), British socialist and unemployed movement activist

== Sports ==
=== Association football (soccer) ===
- Jack Williams (footballer, born 1885), English footballer
- Jack Williams (footballer, born 1906) (1906–1982), English association footballer for Wolverhampton Wanderers, Gillingham, Brighton & Hove Albion
- Jack Williams (footballer, born 1997), English association footballer for Queens Park Rangers

=== Australian rules football ===
- Jack Williams (footballer, born 1902) (1902–1976), Australian rules footballer for Geelong
- Jack Williams (footballer, born 1907) (1907–1987), Australian rules footballer for Fitzroy
- Jack "Basher" Williams (1917–2000), Australian rules footballer for South Melbourne
- Jack Williams (footballer, born 2003), Australian rules footballer for West Coast Eagles

=== Other sports ===
- Jack Williams (rugby union, born 1882) (1882–1911), Wales and British Lions rugby union player
- Jack Williams (rugby union, born 1888) (1888–1965), Welsh rugby union player
- Jack Williams (cricketer) (1931–2025), New Zealand cricketer
- Jack Williams (American football) (born 1985), American football player
- Jack Williams (rugby league) (born 1996), Australian rugby league player
- Jack Williams (archer) (born 2000), American archer
- Jack Williams (ice hockey) (born 2002), American ice hockey player

== Other ==
- Jack Williams (VC) (1886–1953), Welsh recipient of the Victoria Cross
- Jack Williams (Medal of Honor) (1924–1945), American sailor
- Jack Kenny Williams (1920–1981), American teacher and university administrator
- Jack Eric Williams (1944–1994), American actor, composer and lyricist
- Jack Williams (news anchor) (born 1944), Boston TV personality
- Jack Williams (stuntman) (1921–2007), American motion picture stuntman
- Jack Williams (outlaws), two Old West outlaws of the same name
- Jack M. Williams, American chemist
- Jack Williams, alias of Frances Clayton, American woman who disguised as a man to fight in the American Civil War
- Jack Williams, alias of Elizabeth Williams Berry, Australian-born American woman who disguised as a man to compete as a jockey in horse racing
- Jack Williams (journalist), American journalist, science writer, and author and founding editor of the USA Today weather page

== See also ==
- John Williams (disambiguation)
- Jackie Williams (disambiguation)
