= Communication ethics =

Behavior guided by an individual's morals and values

Communication ethics is a sub-branch of moral philosophy concerning the understanding of manifestations of communicative interaction.

Every human interaction involves communication and ethics, whether implicitly or explicitly. Intentional and unintentional ethical dilemmas arise frequently in daily life. Rhetoric, media studies, intercultural/international communication, relational, and organizational communication all incorporate ethical issues.

Communication ethics has implications for enterprises, corporations, professional entities, and individuals. Unethical communication practices within a company can harm its reputation and shareholder value. However, companies must also maintain a balance between transparency and considerations such as privacy, confidentiality, and profitability.

It intersects with disciplines such as sociolinguistics, media ethics, and professional ethics.

== History ==
Historically, communication ethics originated with concerns related to print media and has evolved with the advent of digital technologies. Critics began addressing the harms of the unregulated press in North America and Europe during the 1890s, leading to the establishment of principles in the United States during the 1920s. Four major books emerged during this period: Who's Who of journalism luminaries: Nelson Crawford's Ethics of Journalism (1924), Leon Flint's The Conscience of the Newspaper (1925), William Gibbons's Newspaper Ethics (1926), and Albert Henning's Ethics and Practices in Journalism (1932). These authors left a legacy concerning the meaning of communication ethics and addressed ethical issues in their works. Persistent concerns have always included privacy and confidentiality, which have increasingly been debated in relation to freedom of speech.

== Philosophers ==
Apart from Aristotle's Nicomachean Ethics, which remains perennially relevant, formal considerations regarding the ethics of communication emerged from early codes of journalistic conduct. An exemplary instance is the Journalist's Creed penned by Walter Williams in 1914, who also authored Newspaper Ethics in 1926.

For a concise overview of contemporary thinkers in media ethics, a list can be found on the corresponding page. Since its formalization in the 1980s, media ethics has become nearly synonymous with the field of communication ethics.

Additionally, Hans-Georg Gadamer's book Truth and Method has emerged as an authoritative work in the field, giving rise to several prominent ethical theories and guidelines. Among these, the formulation of dialogic coordinates stands out as particularly profound, establishing a standard set of communication elements essential for fostering dialogue. By adhering to Gadamer's theories on bias, communicators can effectively initiate dialogic transactions, facilitating the convergence of biases to promote mutual understanding and learning.

== Fake news ==
Ethical communication is crucial as it underscores individuals' responsibility to maintain civility in society. With the proliferation of fake news in today's society, the significance of ethical communication cannot be overstated. Fake news has permeated various media platforms, including radio stations, and its impact has only amplified with the emergence of online platforms, particularly social media, as primary sources of news for many individuals. As noted by Tandoc, Lim, and Ling (2018), "Now that online platforms, particularly social media, are becoming the main sources of news for a growing number of individuals, misinformation seems to have found a new channel." Due to the rise of social media, The rise of social media has made it easier to disseminate misinformation globally.

== Codes ==
The obligation to uphold truthfulness is not solely a legal matter, as there is no universal code of ethics applicable to all. One such example is The 1996 SPJ Code, which centres on four principles: to seek truth, minimize harm, remain independent, and maintain accountability. These principles address contemporary challenges arising from the proliferation of the internet.

Additionally, the Code of Professional Ethics for the Communication Scholar/Teacher, adopted in November 1999, outlines guidelines for behaviour, including integrity, fairness, professional and social responsibility, equality of opportunity, confidentiality, honesty, openness, respect for self and others, freedom, and safety. These codes serve as regulatory measures to steer individuals in professions involving communication practices.

== See also ==
- Communication studies
- Communication theory
- Linguistics
- Sociology
- Sociolinguistics
- Fake news
