= Ethics in the Roberts Court =

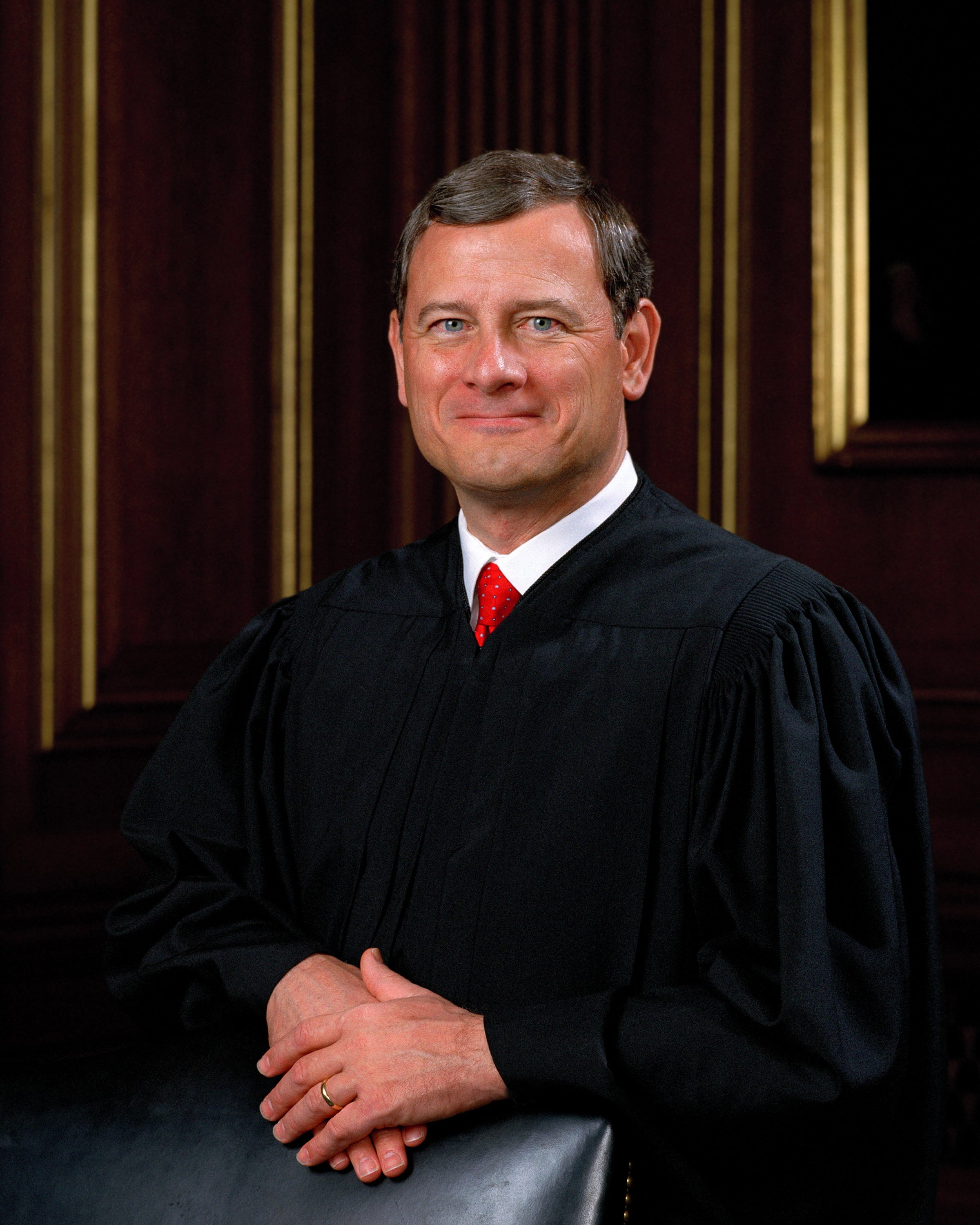
Chief justice John Roberts

Several ethical concerns have arisen in the Roberts Court (2005–present).

== Real estate transactions ==
During his tenure at Kellogg, Hansen, Todd, Figel & Frederick (from 1995 until 2005) Neil Gorsuch represented business magnate Philip Anschutz. Following his appointment to the Court of Appeals for the Tenth Circuit in 2006, Gorsuch has appeared at speaking events at Anschutz's Eagles Nest Ranch. Beginning in 2015, Gorsuch sought a buyer for a forty-acre property in Granby, Colorado, he co-owned with two associates of Anschutz. After Gorsuch's confirmation to the Supreme Court in April 2017, Greenberg Traurig chief executive Brian Duffy purchased Gorsuch's Granby property for $1.8 million; Gorsuch received somewhere between a quarter and half a million dollars from the sale. By April 2023, at least twenty-two cases in which Greenberg Traurig filed an amicus brief or represented a party appeared before the Court. Gorsuch sided with Greenberg eight times and against Greenberg four times. The identity of who purchased the Granby property was not disclosed until a Politico report in April 2023.

== Undisclosed finances ==
The Los Angeles Times reported in December 2004 that justice Clarence Thomas had accepted tens of thousands of dollars in gifts since his confirmation on behalf of real estate developer Harlan Crow, including an invitation to the Bohemian Grove and a $5000 check to assist Thomas's grandnephew's education costs. After the Los Angeles Times's article, Thomas omitted including donations and vacations that he received.

== Responses ==
=== Federal ===
In July 2024, in the wake of multiple conflict-of-interest complaints and media reports, President Joe Biden endorsed the first binding code of ethics for SCOTUS.
