= Code of conduct =

Set of rules

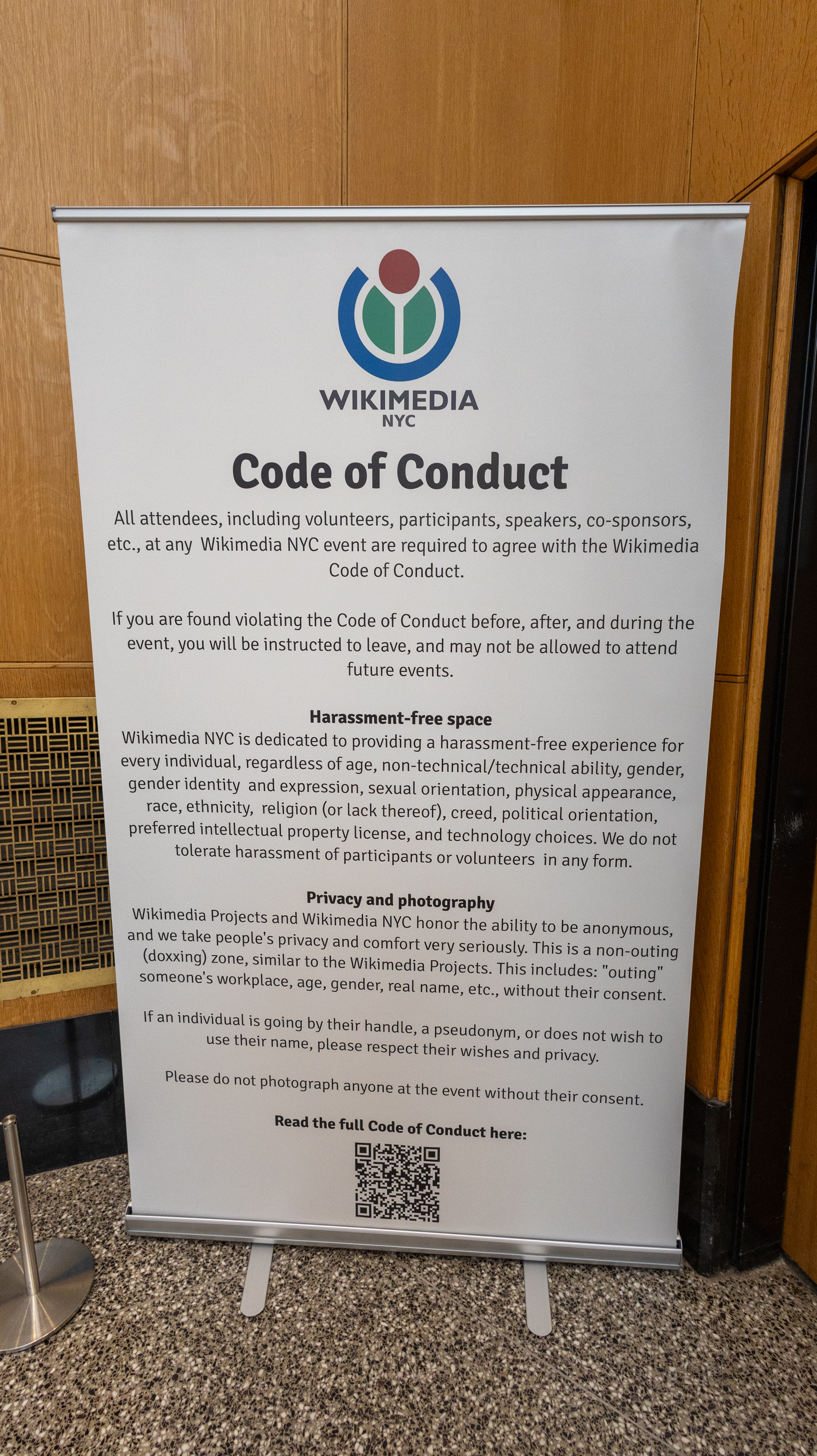
Code of conduct of the Wikimedia Foundation, displayed at an event in New York

A code of conduct is a set of rules outlining the norms, rules, and responsibilities or proper practices of an individual party or an organization.

== Companies' codes of conduct ==
A company code of conduct is a set of rules which is commonly written for employees of a company, which protects the business and informs the employees of the company's expectations. It is appropriate for even the smallest of companies to create a document containing important information on expectations for employees. The document does not need to be complex or have elaborate policies.

Failure of an employee to follow a company's code of conduct can have negative consequences. In Morgan Stanley v. Skowron, 989 F. Supp. 2d 356 (S.D.N.Y. 2013), applying New York's faithless servant doctrine, the court held that a hedge fund's employee engaging in insider trading in violation of his company's code of conduct, which also required him to report his misconduct, must repay his employer the full $31 million his employer paid him as compensation during his period of faithlessness.

== International guidance ==
The UN has promoted codes of conduct as a means of improving business practices. Agenda 21, adopted in 1992, called for increased self-regulation, guided by codes, charters, and other initiatives to address health, safety, and environmental concerns. The UN Guidelines for Consumer Protection, as expanded in 1999, encouraged cooperation between businesses and consumer organizations to develop and implement "codes of marketing and other business practices". In its own procurement activities, the UN requires potential suppliers to acknowledge its Supplier Code of Conduct, with some provisions becoming binding through procurement contracts.

The International Federation of Accountants in its 2007 International Good Practice Guidance, Defining and Developing an Effective Code of Conduct for Organizations, provided the following working definition of a code of conduct: "Principles, values, standards, or rules of behavior that guide the decisions, procedures, and systems of an organization in a way that (a) contributes to the welfare of its key stakeholders, and (b) respects the rights of all constituents affected by its operations."

== Personal Codes of Conduct ==
While codes of conduct are commonly associated with organizations and institutions, individuals can also develop a personal code of conduct, to guide their behavior, decision-making, and responses to adversity. These personal codes typically reflect a person's core values, ethical principles, and practice aspirational virtues - such as courage, honesty, discipline, or resilience.

Historically, figures like Roman emperor Marcus Aurelius, through his philosophical reflections in Meditations, or the samurai class, through the Bushidō code, adhered to personal codes that shaped their worldview and conduct. In contemporary settings, individuals may adopt a personal code of conduct to uphold integrity, cultivate psychological resilience, or navigate unpredictable or stressful environments. Such self-imposed frameworks of rules can offer a structured psychological anchor by reinforcing a sense of agency and control.

Psychological research suggests that individuals with a higher internal locus of control, defined as the belief that one can influence outcomes through their own actions, are generally more resilient and motivated in the face of adversity. Studies on learned helplessness and control have demonstrated that perceived control is closely linked to psychological well-being and adaptive coping behaviors. Developing and consistently adhering to a personal code may support an internal locus of control by encouraging deliberate, value-driven responses to life's challenges. Writing down one's personal code and reviewing it regularly can further reinforce commitment, aid in goal-setting, and improve behavioral consistency.

== Codes of conduct in practice ==
A code of conduct can be an important part in establishing an inclusive culture, but it is not a comprehensive solution on its own. An ethical culture is created by the organization's leaders who manifest their ethics in their attitudes and behaviour. Studies of codes of conduct in the private sector show that their effective implementation must be part of a learning process that requires training, consistent enforcement, and continuous measurement/improvement: simply requiring members to read the code is not enough to ensure that they understand it and will remember its contents. Castellano et al. describe Tom Morris' book If Aristotle Ran General Motors as "compelling" and "persuasive" in arguing that in addition to codes of conduct and ethical guidelines, the creation of an ethical workplace climate requires "socially harmonious relationships" to be embedded in practice. The proof of effectiveness is when employees/members feel comfortable enough to voice concerns and believe that the organization will respond with appropriate action.

== Examples ==
- Banking Code
- Bushido
- Code of Conduct for the International Red Cross and Red Crescent Movement and NGOs in Disaster Relief
- International Code of Conduct for Private Security Service Providers
- Code of Conduct for Justices of the Supreme Court of the United States
- Code of Hammurabi
- Code of the United States Fighting Force
- Code of Service Discipline
- Contributor Covenant
- Declaration of Geneva
- Declaration of Helsinki
- Don't be evil
- Eight precepts
- Election Commission of India's Model Code of Conduct
- Five Pillars of Islam
- Five precepts
- Golden Rule
- Geneva Conventions
- Hippocratic Oath
- ICC Cricket Code of Conduct
- International Code of Conduct against Ballistic Missile Proliferation (ICOC or Hague Code of Conduct)
- Izzat
- Journalist's Creed
- Kapu
- Moral Code of the Builder of Communism
- Pāṭimokkha
- Pirate code
- Rule of Saint Benedict
- Ten Commandments
- Ten precepts (Taoism)
- Three Fundamental Bonds and Five Constant Virtues
- Uniform Code of Military Justice
- Vienna Convention on Diplomatic Relations
- Yamas

== See also ==
- Programming ethics
