= Jackie Williams =

Jackie Williams may refer to:

- Salvatore Tripoli (1904–1990), American bantamweight boxer, also known as Jackie Williams
- Jackie Williams (footballer, born 1929) (1929–c. 1973), footballer for Tranmere Rovers
- Jackie Williams (footballer, born 1911) (1911–1979), footballer for Wales, Huddersfield Town and Aston Villa

== See also ==
- Jack Williams (disambiguation)
