= David Wheeler (Alabama politician) =

American businessman (1950–2022)

Member of the Alabama House of Representatives from the 47th district
- In office November 6, 2018 – March 9, 2022
- Preceded by: Jack D. Williams
- Succeeded by: Mike Shaw

Personal details
- Born: January 11, 1950 Jemison, Alabama, U.S.
- Died: March 9, 2022 (aged 72)
- Party: Republican
- Spouse: Diane Reeves
- Education: University of Montevallo (BA); Samford University (MBA)
- Profession: Businessman

David W. Wheeler (January 11, 1950 – March 9, 2022) was an American businessman and politician who served in the Alabama House of Representatives representing the 47th district, from 2018 until his death. He was a member of the Republican Party.

== Education and early career ==
Wheeler was born in Jemison, Alabama. Wheeler received a bachelor's degree in accounting from the University of Montevallo in 1972. He then attained an MBA from Samford University in 1976. He later served a lengthy period on the board of trustees for the University of Montevallo, starting in 2008.

After finishing graduate school, Wheeler became a certified management accountant. He worked for Alabama Power for 29 years, and was its manager of federal affairs from 1972 to 1988, during which he worked in Washington, D.C. He also held other managerial roles during his time at the company, and by the time of his retirement in 2001, he was its director of accounting, finance and regulatory services, working directly with the Alabama Public Service Commission. He also served as president of Vulcan Termite and Pest Control Inc. for three years.

Wheeler was active in the U.S. Jaycees organization, and was president of its Birmingham branch. He also previously served on the board of directors for both the Birmingham Regional Chamber of Commerce and the Jefferson County Citizens Supervisory Committee.

== Political career ==
Wheeler first entered politics as the chairman of the Jefferson County Republican Party, in addition to a position on the Alabama Republican Party State Executive Committee.

In December 2013, Wheeler began a campaign for the Alabama House of Representatives' 47th district, challenging incumbent representative Jack D. Williams in the 2014 Republican primary. Wheeler cited his prior service as the Jefferson County Republican Party chairman and presented himself as an outsider, calling Williams a "career politician". Wheeler was defeated in the primary with 40 percent of the vote to Williams' 60 percent.

Wheeler launched a bid for treasurer of the Alabama Republican Party in February 2015, citing his professional experience with Alabama Power. He was elected to the position on February 21, at the party's winter meeting for the year. During his tenure as treasurer, Wheeler supported Del Marsh's plan to legalize gambling in the state as a way to resolve budget issues. He also pushed for removing state involvement in retail alcohol sales.

After Jack Williams retired from the Alabama House of Representatives to run for Jefferson County Commissioner, Wheeler announced in June 2017 that he would again seek election to the 47th district in the now-open seat. Unopposed in the primary, Wheeler faced Democratic businessman Jim Toomey in the general election, and won with 54 percent of the vote to Toomey's 46 percent.

As a state representative, Wheeler was an ardent supporter of term limits. He first introduced a bill in February 2019 that would place a two-term limit on state legislators. Wheeler made several other attempts to enact term limits, but none of the bills made it out of committee. His committee assignments included Commerce and Small Business, Jefferson County Legislation, and the Local Legislation Committee.

Wheeler was critical of the handling of COVID-19 lockdowns, arguing that small business suffered while large chain stores remained open. In February 2021, he proposed HB108, a bill that would create a Jefferson County Citizens Health Advisory Board that would give recommendations to the Jefferson County Board of Health before any decisions were made. In August 2021, Wheeler helped pass a bill that gave state election officials more leeway in the appointment of poll workers, specifically allowing workers to serve in any precinct in a county. At the time of his death in 2022, Wheeler was running unopposed in the Republican primary for re-election to the Alabama House of Representatives.

== Personal life and death ==
Wheeler was married to Diane Reeves Wheeler and resided in Vestavia Hills, Alabama. They had a daughter, Jessica. The Wheelers attended the All Saints Episcopal Church in Homewood, Alabama. Wheeler died on March 9, 2022, at the age of 72. No cause of death was immediately released.

== Electoral history ==
2018 Alabama House of Representatives, 47th district, general election results
Party	Candidate	Votes	%
Republican	David Wheeler	9,170	54.3%
Democratic	Jim Toomey	7,721	45.7%
Total votes		16,891	100.0%
Republican hold			

2014 Alabama House of Representatives, 47th district, Republican Party primary results
Party	Candidate	Votes	%
Republican	Jack D. Williams (incumbent)	2,624	60.25%
Republican	David Wheeler	1,731	39.75%
Total votes		4,355	100.0%
