= Ann Walsh =

American painter

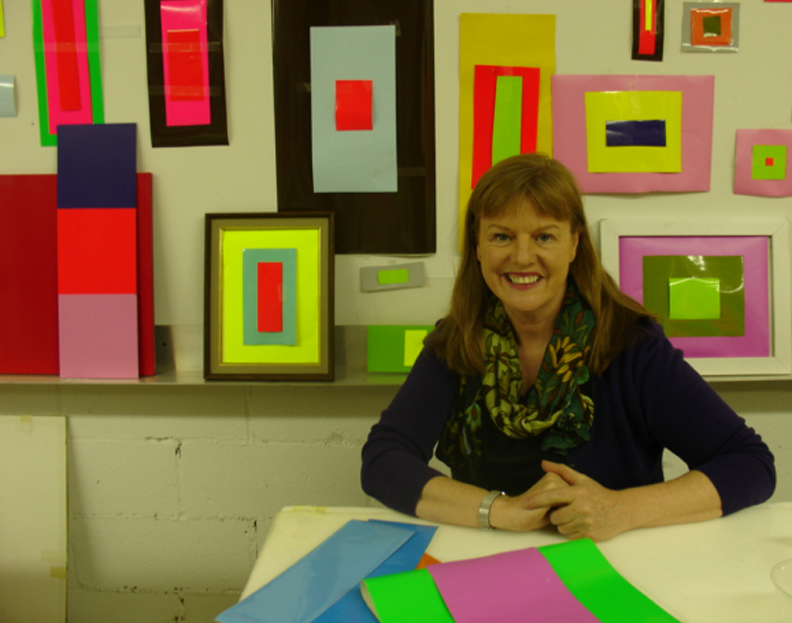
Ann Walsh

Ann Walsh is a visual artist, primarily working with paint, Plexiglas and vinyl. Her work has been displayed in The Everson Museum of Art, the Portland Museum of Art, the Saint-Gaudens National Historic Site and the Lori Bookstein Gallery, among others.

Walsh was born in Minneapolis, Minnesota, but received her bachelor of arts, then a masters of fine arts at Syracuse University in 1979. She later relocated to New York City, where she currently resides. She is married to fellow artist James Walsh.

Her artistic style has been compared to the color fields of Kenneth Noland and to sculptor Anne Truitt. She is a painter that usually works in three dimensions. Her work is described as "process-based", "formalist", "minimal or hard-edge" abstraction. Walsh's use of color, described as warm and nuanced, have been likened to Noland and Helen Frankenthaler. Her relationships with art critic Clement Greenberg, artists Jules Olitski, Anthony Caro and Noland, among others, have influenced her development.

== Selected shows ==
- Sideshow, Williamsburg, Brooklyn, 2014-2003
- Saint-Gaudens National Historic Site, (with James Walsh), 2012
- Summer Edition, Lori Bookstein Fine Art, 2012
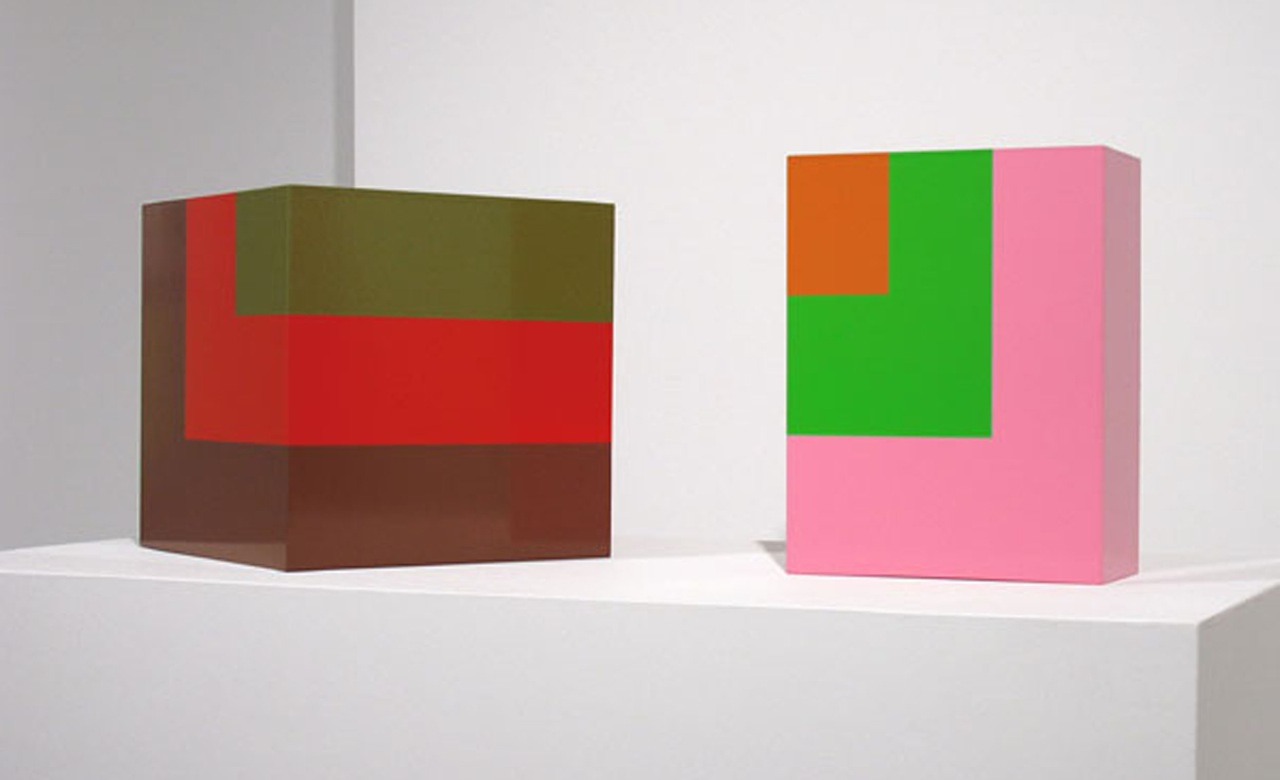
- Color and Edge, Sideshow, Williamsburg, Brooklyn 2012
- Lori Bookstein Fine Art, Color as Structure, 2007
- University of Massachusetts, Amherst, MA, 2005
- Alexander Brest Museum and Gallery, Jacksonville University, Jacksonville, Florida, (2 person show), 2002
- Clement Greenberg: A Critic's Collection, Portland Museum of Art, Portland, Oregon (toured Tulsa, Oklahoma, Dayton, Ohio, Syracuse, New York, Columbia, South Carolina, Naples, Florida, Palm Springs, California), 2001
- Greenberg Wilson Gallery, NYC, 1991, 1990, 1989
- C. Grimaldis Gallery, Baltimore 1987
- The Everson Museum of Art, Syracuse, NY 1981
