= E.W. Stephens Publishing Company =

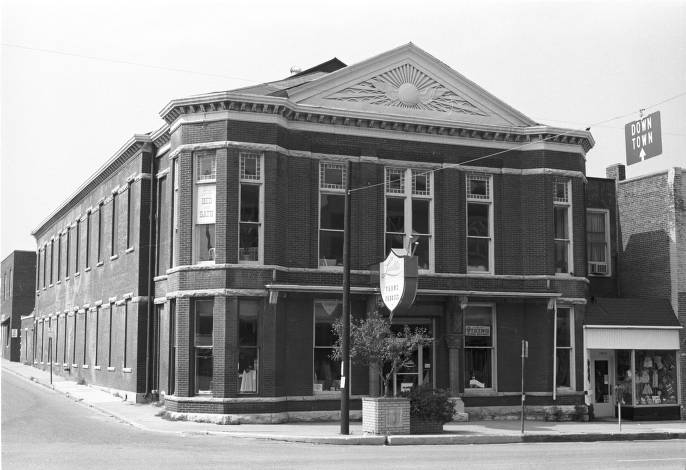
- Founded: Late-19th century
- Founder: Edwin William Stephens
- Country of origin: United States
- Headquarters location: Columbia, Missouri
- Key people: Walter Williams
- Publication types: Books, Newspapers, Pamphlets

The E.W. Stephens Publishing Company was an American publishing company in Columbia, Missouri founded by Edwin William Stephens. Operating from the late 19th century into the 20th century, the press produced newspapers, novels, non-fiction books, textbooks, government documents, and other printed paper products. The Columbia Herald, a weekly newspaper published from 1873 to 1913 was also owned by E. W. Stephens and printed by the publishing company. Walter Williams, the father of journalism education and founder of the Missouri School of Journalism was its long-time editor. In its heyday, the press was the largest private employer in Columbia. The Herald Building, designed by Morris Frederick Bell, is a contributing property in the Downtown Columbia, Missouri National Historic District.
