= Reynolds Wolf =

American television meteorologist

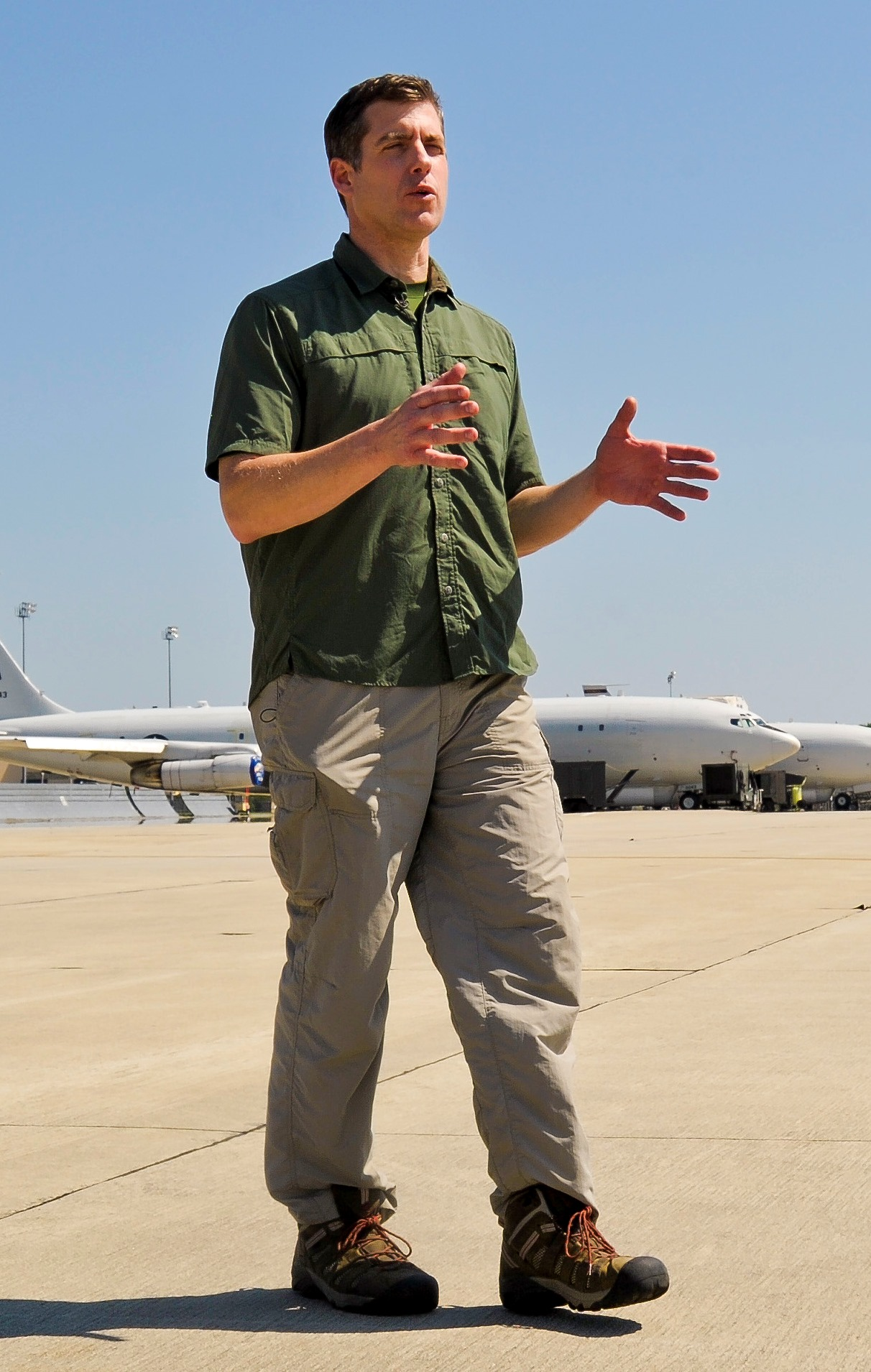
- Reynolds Wolf reporting in 2012
- Born: Reynolds Scott Wolf; March 16, 1970 (age 55); Charlotte, North Carolina
- Education: Jacksonville State University and Mississippi State University
- Occupations: Journalist, Meteorologist, Reporter
- Employer: The Weather Channel
- Spouse: Erin Cogswell-Wolf
- Children: 4

Reynolds Scott Wolf (born March 16, 1970) is an American meteorologist and journalist currently employed by The Weather Channel. He formerly worked for CNN, where his forecasts could usually be seen on CNN Saturday Morning, CNN Sunday Morning, and weekend editions of CNN Newsroom. He also served as a weather correspondent and reporter on other CNN programs.

Wolf is currently a host of AMHQ Weekend and occasionally on AMHQ.

== Early life and career ==
Born in Charlotte, North Carolina, and raised in Jemison, Alabama, Wolf is a graduate of Jacksonville State University and has a certificate in Broadcast Meteorology from Mississippi State University. He has worked in many television stations across the United States, including KMOV in St. Louis, Missouri, WDIV-TV in Detroit, Michigan, WKMG in Orlando, Florida, KXAN-TV in Austin, Texas, KSBY in San Luis Obispo, California, and WJSU in Anniston, Alabama.

=== CNN ===
Wolf joined CNN in 2006, and was released in May 2012. He made his debut on The Weather Channel as part of their Hurricane Isaac coverage on August 26, 2012.

== Memberships ==
Wolf is a member of the American Meteorological Society and the National Weather Association, as well as the Alpha Tau Omega fraternity.

== Personal life ==
Wolf is married to Erin Cogswell Wolf and they have four children, three girls and one boy. They live near Atlanta, Georgia

Wolf is an avid fly-fisherman, outdoorsman, adventurer, and conservationist.
