= Edwin William Stephens =

American journalist (1849–1931)

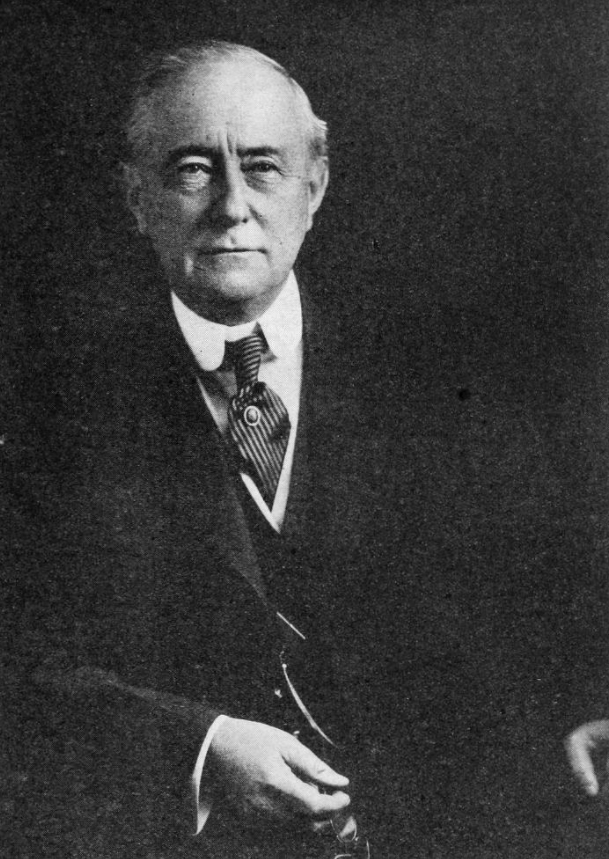
- Born: January 21, 1849; Columbia, Missouri
- Died: May 21, 1931 (aged 82); Columbia, Missouri
- Resting place: Columbia Cemetery
- Education: University of Missouri
- Occupations: Journalist, publisher
- Notable work: Around the World
- Spouse: Laura Moss
- Children: Hugh Stephens, E. Sydney Stephens
- Parent: James L. Stephens

Edwin William Stephens (January 21, 1849 – May 21, 1931) was an American publisher and journalist. He founded the E.W. Stephens Publishing Company and published a former daily newspaper in town known as the Columbia Herald (competing with the current Columbia Daily Tribune and the Columbia Missourian). He also was active in the arena of national journalism in America, serving as president of the National Editorial Association. A prominent Baptist, he was president of the Southern Baptist Convention. In 1911, he chaired the appointed state commission that designed and built the Missouri State Capitol, which was completed in 1917. He also served as president of the board of curators of both his alma mater of the University of Missouri at Columbia (established 1839), and the private / religious-affiliated all-women Stephens College, the latter being named after his father James L. Stephens and founded 1833.

== Biography ==
Edwin William Stephens was born into a prominent family in Columbia, Missouri on January 21, 1849. He graduated from the University of Missouri at Columbia, in 1867. He was hired by William F. Switzler (1819-1906), prominent publisher of the Missouri Statesman. In 1870 he went into business for himself, eventually founding the Columbia Herald, which became famous as "America's model weekly." He also founded the E.W. Stephens Publishing Company. Stephens served as president of the board of curators for both the University of Missouri and Stephens College, which was named after his father James L. Stephens. In 1890, he was president of the Missouri Press Association where he would advocate for the creation of the Missouri State Historical Society and became its first president in 1898. His relationship with Walter Williams (1864-1935), who he employed at The Herald, would lead to the creation of the world's first school of journalism: the Missouri School of Journalism associated with the University of Missouri in Columbia. Stephens also chaired the appointed state commission responsible for the design and construction of the current monumental Missouri State Capitol on the south bank bluffs overlooking the Missouri River in the state capital town of Jefferson City, built between 1911 and 1917.

He was a lifelong member and leader of the First Baptist Church in Columbia. He died at age 82 years at his home on May 21, 1931, aged 82, and is buried in the Columbia Cemetery.

== See also ==
- Boone County Historical Society
- List of Southern Baptist Convention affiliated people
- Southern Baptist Convention
- Southern Baptist Convention Presidents

| Preceded by James Philip Eagle | President of the Southern Baptist Convention; 1905–1907 | Succeeded by Joshua Levering |
