= Jacksonville College of Music =

Former music school in Florida, United States

Coordinates: 30.3531°N 81.6045°W

- Type: Private
- Established: 1923
- Academic affiliations: National Association of Schools of Music
- President: William B. Hoskins (1954 - 1958); George Orner (1934)
- Location: Jacksonville, Florida, U.S.
- Campus: Urban

The Jacksonville College of Music was a private post-secondary music school in Jacksonville, Florida. Founded in 1923 by George Orner, Lyman P. Prior and William Meyer, it became accredited by the National Association of Schools of Music in 1931 or 1937. Its main campus was in downtown Jacksonville on Herschel Street.

The school merged with Jacksonville University on June 1, 1958, to become the College of Music of Jacksonville University.
