= Gary Tabach =

United States Navy captain

- Born: February 1962 (age 64); Moscow, USSR
- Military career
- Allegiance: United States of America
- Branch: United States Navy
- Service years: 1985–2011
- Rank: Captain
- Commands: Special representative to the president and an advisor to the U.S. ambassador in Moscow, USSR; Head of Military Information Office (MIO) in the U.N. Special Military Observer Mission in Georgia (UNOMIG); Chief of the Arms Control Implementation Unit in Kazakhstan; Naval Affairs Officer in the Office of Defense Cooperation at the U.S. Embassy in Warsaw, Poland; Program manager in the Threat Reduction Office at the U.S. Embassy in Moscow; Deputy director of the NATO Center of Excellence – Defense Against Terrorism in Ankara, Turkey; Chief of Staff of the NATO Military Liaison Mission in Moscow
- Awards: Defense Service Medal; Legion of Merit; Joint Defense Meritorious Service Medals (4); Defense Meritorious Service Medal; Joint Commendation Medals (2); United Nations Medal; Navy Commendation Medal; Meritorious Honor Award; Joint Achievement Medal; Naval Achievement Medals (2)

Gary (Yuri) Tabach (born February 1962) is a retired United States Navy captain, the first Soviet-born citizen to be commissioned an officer in the Armed Forces of the United States. Tabach was an advisor to the U.S. ambassador and special presidential envoy to the former Soviet Union. He held various positions in NATO missions and recognized for his expertise on military affairs, defense reduction strategy, national security issues and counterterrorism.

== Early life and education ==
Gary Tabach was born in Moscow, USSR, to Zinovy Tabach, a dentist, and Rima Tabach, a hematologist. In 1976, he emigrated to the United States with his parents, older sister, and grandmother.

In 1985, Tabach earned a pharmacy degree from Temple University in Philadelphia. A year later, he completed parachute training. From 1990 to 1993, he pursued an MBA at the Jacksonville University in Florida.

== Military career ==
Upon graduating from Temple University, he was commissioned as an Ensign in the U.S. Navy. From 1985 to 1991, he worked as a pharmacist for Naval hospitals.

In 1991, Tabach became a special representative to the President and an assistant and advisor to the U.S. ambassador to the countries of the former USSR. Until 1994, he worked at the U.S. Embassy in Moscow, serving as a liaison between the U.S. government and the governments of the former Soviet Union countries. He represented the U.S. government's interests, advised the U.S. Ambassador on policy and strategy, and provided analysis and recommendations on political, economic, and security developments in the region.

In 1994, he joined Prisoner of War – Missing in Action Commission, actively searching for U.S. POWs and MIAs in the former Soviet Union. Additionally, he served as a course director at USUHS.

In 1997, he held the position of Head of Military Information Office (MIO) in the U.N. Special Military Observer Mission in Georgia (UNOMIG), leading the hostage negotiation team.

From 1998 to 2000, Tabach served as a Chief of the Arms Control Implementation Unit at the U.S. Embassy in Almaty, Kazakhstan.

Subsequently, he was Naval Affairs Officer in the Office of Defense Cooperation at the U.S. Embassy in Warsaw, Poland, overseeing arms shipments to Poland during its transition to NATO standards. He also was a program manager in the Threat Reduction Office at the U.S. Embassy in Moscow.

From 2006 to 2008, Tabach was the first deputy director of the NATO Center of Excellence – Defense Against Terrorism in Ankara, Turkey. He was responsible for leading a staff of 90 international military personnel from seven NATO countries.

From 2008 to 2011, he was the Chief of Staff of the NATO Military Liaison Mission coordinating contacts with the Russian Ministry of Defense in Moscow.

Tabach received military awards for his service, including the Legion of Merit, one of the highest U.S. military honors.

Tabach retired from the U.S. Navy in 2011 and is the CEO of Fort Seal.

== Military decorations ==
- Defense Service Medal
- Legion of Merit
- Joint Defense Meritorious Service Medals (4 awards)
- Defense Meritorious Service Medal
- Joint Commendation Medals (2 awards)
- United Nations Medal
- Navy Commendation Medal
- Meritorious Honor Award
- Joint Achievement Medal
- Naval Achievement Medals (2 awards)

== Personal life ==
Tabach is highly critical of both Putin's foreign and domestic policies and actively supports Ukraine in their fight for sovereignty and freedom.

His daughter, Michelle, also became a naval officer, as a lieutenant-commander on a combat ship and leading the combat operations control section.

== Publications ==
- Tabach, Gary (1991). "Return to the Soviet Union". Navy Medicine. 82: 21–24.
- Tabach, Gary (December 1998). "Georgian Peacekeeping Mission" (PDF). FAO Journal. III (4): 13–19.
- Mittleman, Ari; Tabach, Gary (June 1, 2018). "Two countries with miraculous pasts contribute to a shared future". Pittsburgh Jewish Chronicle.
