= Jacksonville University =

Private university in Jacksonville, Florida, US

- Former names: William J. Porter University (1934–1935); Jacksonville Junior College (1935–1958)
- Motto: Fiat Lux (Latin)
- Motto in English: "Let There Be Light"
- Type: Private university
- Established: April 16, 1934; 92 years ago
- Accreditation: SACS
- Academic affiliations: ICUF
- Endowment: $59.2 million (2022)
- Chancellor: Tim Cost
- President: Lisa Sutherland (interim)
- Provost: Sherri Jackson (interim)
- Faculty: 180+
- Undergraduates: 2,946 (fall 2024)
- Postgraduates: 1,301 (fall 2024)
- Location: Jacksonville, Florida, United States; 30.3532°N 81.6045°W
- Campus: 260 acres (110 ha); Large city
- Newspaper: The Navigator
- Colors: Green and white
- Nickname: Dolphins
- Sporting affiliations: NCAA Division I - ASUN; SoCon; MAAC; SAISA
- Mascot: Nellie
- Website: www.ju.edu

Jacksonville University (JU) is a private university in Jacksonville, Florida, United States. Located in the city's Arlington district, the school was founded in 1934 as a two-year college and was known as Jacksonville Junior College until September 5, 1956, when it shifted focus to building four-year university degree programs and later graduated its first four-year degree candidates as Jacksonville University in June 1959.

The university is accredited by the Southern Association of Colleges and Schools (SACS). JU's student body currently represents more than 40 U.S. states and approximately 45 countries around the world. As a Division I institution, it fields 18 varsity athletics teams, known as the JU Dolphins, as well as intramural sports and clubs. Among the top majors declared by JU students are electrical and mechanical engineering, aviation management, biology, nursing, business, and marine science.

== History ==
The school was founded in 1934 by William J. Porter. Originally known as William J. Porter University, it began as a private two-year college. Since a permanent site had not yet been acquired, classes were held on the third floor auditorium of the First Baptist Church Educational Building in downtown Jacksonville. Sixty students were enrolled in Porter University's first year of operation.

The school changed its name to Jacksonville Junior College in 1935. It relocated three times over the next fifteen years, including a period in the Florida Theatre building, but the influx of GI bill students following the end of World War II made it necessary for the school to find a permanent location. In 1947 the administration purchased land in Jacksonville's Arlington neighborhood on which to establish the current campus. The first building was completed in 1950 and classes officially began. The same year the school received full accreditation as a two-year college from the Southern Association of Colleges and Schools (SACS).

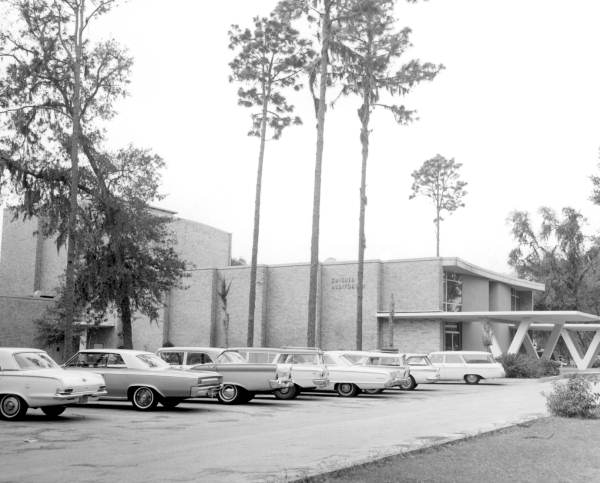
Swisher Gymnasium in 1964

In 1958 Jacksonville Junior College merged with the Jacksonville College of Music, and the name was changed to Jacksonville University. In 1959 the first four-year class of 100 students graduated, and in 1961 JU received full accreditation as a four-year school from SACS. The 1960s saw the university grow substantially as enrollment increased, dormitories were built, two new colleges were established and the Swisher Gymnasium was constructed. The first student dormitories (Williams, McGehee, Brest, Merrill and Grether Halls) opened for the fall semester of 1965 on the south part of campus for a combined total of $2.4 million. The sixth dormitory, Botts Hall, opened in 1968. In 1970 the Jacksonville University Dolphins men's basketball team, under star center Artis Gilmore, went to the NCAA Division I Championship. However, the opening of the public University of North Florida in 1972 eroded JU's enrollment, while the removal of public funding hurt the school financially. In the 1990s Jacksonville University reconfigured itself as primarily a liberal arts college and embarked on a substantial fundraising campaign, which provided for the construction of new buildings and a revision of the campus master plan. In 1997 a new cafeteria was constructed, a Visual Arts Annex opened, and the on-campus Villages Apartments finished construction and opened for students on the north part of campus. Merrill and Grether Hall were demolished in 2007 to make way for Oak Hall, a modern 500-bed dormitory, and a new parking garage.

George Hallam, in conjunction with Jacksonville University and its library staff, published an extensive history of the university titled Our Place in the Sun, which details the development and progress of the institution between its inception in 1934 through the spring of 1988. Other university publications which have chronicled JU history throughout the decades include the JU Navigator, the Riparian, and The Wave magazine.

In April 2025, Jacksonville University announced sweeping restructuring plans that eliminated 40 faculty positions and reduced undergraduate programs from 60 to 37. The faculty responded with a no-confidence vote against President Tim Cost, criticizing the abrupt termination of tenured professors, lack of financial transparency, and violation of shared governance principles. The administration also faced scrutiny for breaching a debt covenant during Cost's leadership.

The cuts blindsided students, with some learning their majors would be discontinued. Protests erupted as students and faculty disputed the administration's claim that only about 100 students university-wide would be affected, with one department alone reporting over 100 impacted students. While the university offered 18 full-ride scholarships to displaced students, the board of trustees stood by Cost, declaring full confidence in his leadership.

== Academics ==
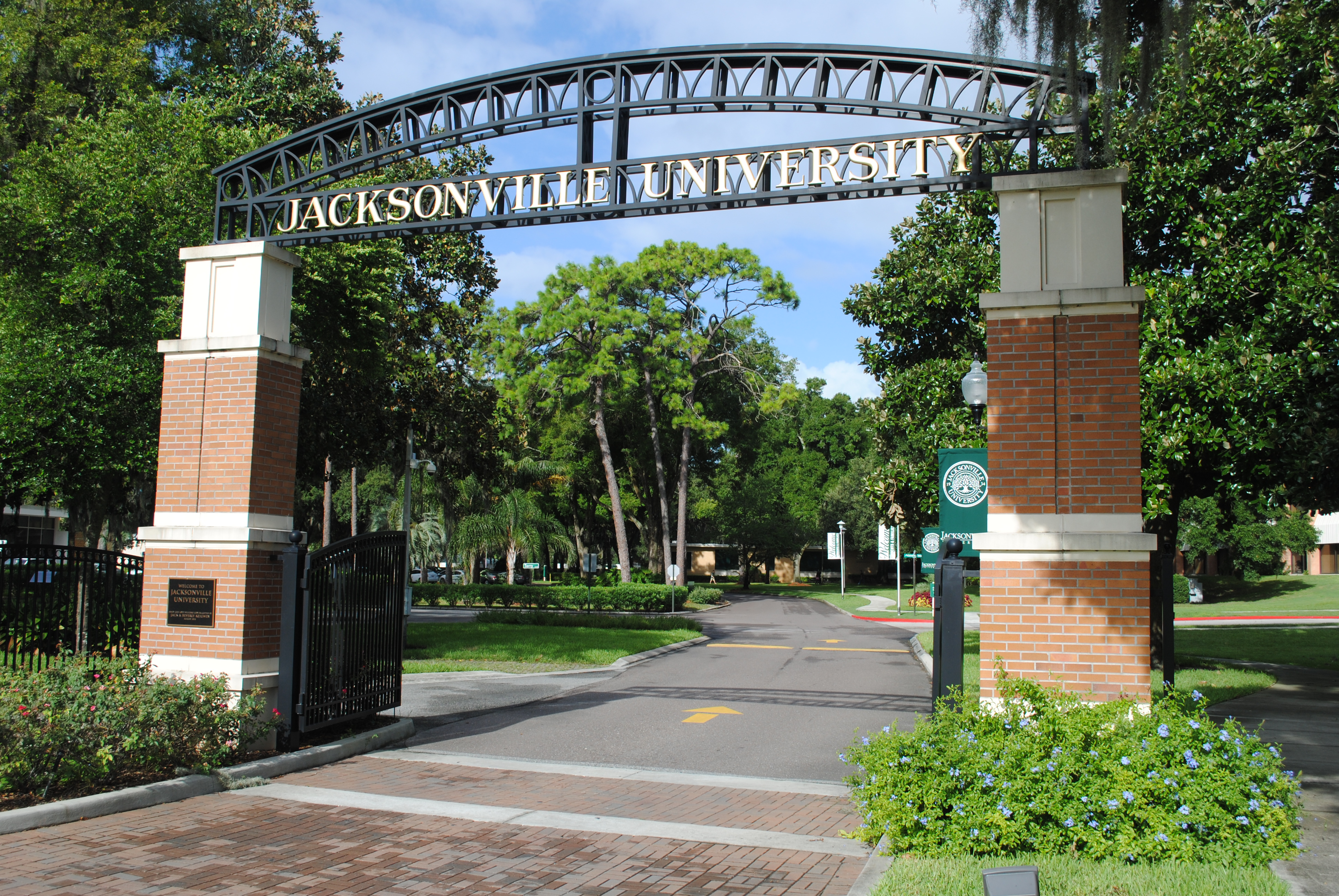
The main entrance of Jacksonville University

Jacksonville University offers more than 100 majors, minors, and programs at the undergraduate level, as well as 23 master's and doctorate degree programs, leading to the M.S., M.A., M.A.T., and Master of Business Administration, Doctor of Occupational Therapy (OTD), and Doctor of Nursing Practice (DNP).

=== Undergraduate admissions ===
In 2024, Jacksonville University accepted 57.3% of undergraduate applicants, with admission standards considered challenging, applicant competition considered average, and with those enrolled having an average 3.61 high school GPA. The university does not require submission of standardized test scores, but they will be considered when submitted. Those enrolled who submitted test scores had an average 1190 SAT score (24% submitting scores) or an average 26 ACT score (13% submitting scores).

=== Organization ===
The university is divided into five colleges: the College of Arts and Sciences, the Davis College of Business & Technology, the College of Fine Arts & Humanities, the College of Law, and the Brooks Rehabilitation College of Healthcare Sciences. Along with the five colleges, the university also consists of three institutes: the Marine Science Research Institute, the Public Policy Institute, and the STEAM Institute.

The College of Arts and Sciences offers a traditional liberal arts education and includes JU's School of Education, Wilma's Little People School, science and mathematics, social sciences, humanities, and the Naval Reserve Officer Training Corps (NROTC). JU has the second-largest Naval Reserve Officer Training Corps program in the nation and the longest-running in Florida. Jacksonville is a military- and veteran-friendly town, and is home to three major military installations. It is also an approved Yellow Ribbon School, and is home to the Jacksonville University Veterans and Military Resource Center (VMRC). University staff and administration includes many distinguished veterans from multiple branches of the U.S. military.

The College of Fine Arts & Humanities, with its integrated Alexander Brest Museum and Gallery, offers dance, theatre, music, and visual arts. Graduate programs are available in choreography and visual arts.

The Davis College of Business & Technology (DCOBT) received its AACSB accreditation in January 2010, and is the only private, AACSB-accredited business school in North Florida. DCOBT offers both MBA and EMBA degrees, along with undergraduate business degrees in accounting, aviation management, aviation management & flight operations, business administration, business analytics, business information systems, economics, finance, international business, management, marketing, and sport business. In both 2017 and 2018, the school's CFA Research Challenge team won the CFA Institute Research Challenge in Florida, beating out schools such as University of Miami and University of Florida, and went on to compete nationally. In 2018 they won the national competition and competed as finalists in the global CFA Institute Research Challenge in Kuala Lumpur, Malaysia. Jacksonville University has also teamed up with the Florida Coastal School of Law to offer a joint MBA/law degree, and joined forces with Aerosim Flight Academy to provide professional flight training to students of its ever-popular aviation major.

The inaugural class of Jacksonville University College of Law occurred in August 2022 with fourteen students. Twenty-six students joined the next year. Provisional accreditation was granted to the school by the American Bar Association during that organization's February 22–23, 2024 meeting.

The JU Flight Team competes in National Intercollegiate Flying Association Regional and National Safety and Flight Evaluation Conference (SAFECON) against other universities, with its best team performance in 2007. The program is the third largest in the nation, behind Spartan School in Tulsa, Oklahoma and the Embry-Riddle Aeronautical University in Daytona Beach. The team placed 10th in the nation at the National Intercollegiate Flying Association. In 2008, the team was awarded the Loening Trophy, which is given to the best collegiate aviation program in the country each year. It is currently on display in the Smithsonian in Washington, DC.

The Brooks Rehabilitation College of Healthcare Sciences (BRCHS), includes the School of Orthodontics and one of JU's many premier learning environments, the Simulation Training and Applied Research (STAR) Center where students can participate in simulations of everything from childbirth to wound care.

The university's BRCHS program offers Bachelor of Science in kinesiology, Bachelor of Science in nursing, and a Master of Science in Nursing degree, among many other degree programs and certifications. In 2014, Jacksonville University partnered with Brooks Rehabilitation Hospital to create the Brooks Rehabilitation Speech-Language Pathology program. BRCHS is affiliated with hundreds of local healthcare partners, including Nemours Children's Clinic, Baptist Health Systems, Shands, St. Vincent's Healthcare, Florida Blue, Duval County Public Schools, and Wolfson Children's Hospital.

In 2012, the university established the Public Policy Institute (PPI), offering the only Master in Public Policy (MPP) degree program in the state of Florida. The institute also offers dual degree programs in conjunction with the Davis College of Business and hosts a variety of politically related events, including televised debates for local and regional elections, a radio program titled Policy Matters, and internship opportunities with local companies, local government and the Office of the Governor.

On February 28, 2022, Jacksonville University announced that with the assistance of a Jacksonville municipal grant, it was starting a law school. The announcement was made by Jacksonville University president Tim Cost and Mayor Lenny Curry. The location will be in the VyStar Building downtown where Jacksonville University already has a facility for working students. The law school opened in August 2022 with an initial enrollment of 14 students, the first new law school to open in the U.S. since 2014.

In November 2022, the university announced that it had partnered with the Lake Erie College of Osteopathic Medicine to open a branch of the medical school at the Arlington Campus by 2026.

=== Rankings ===
Jacksonville University was ranked tied for No.41 out of 135 Regional Universities South, and No.26 in Best Value Schools, in U.S. News & World Report's Best Colleges rankings for 2025.

== Athletics ==
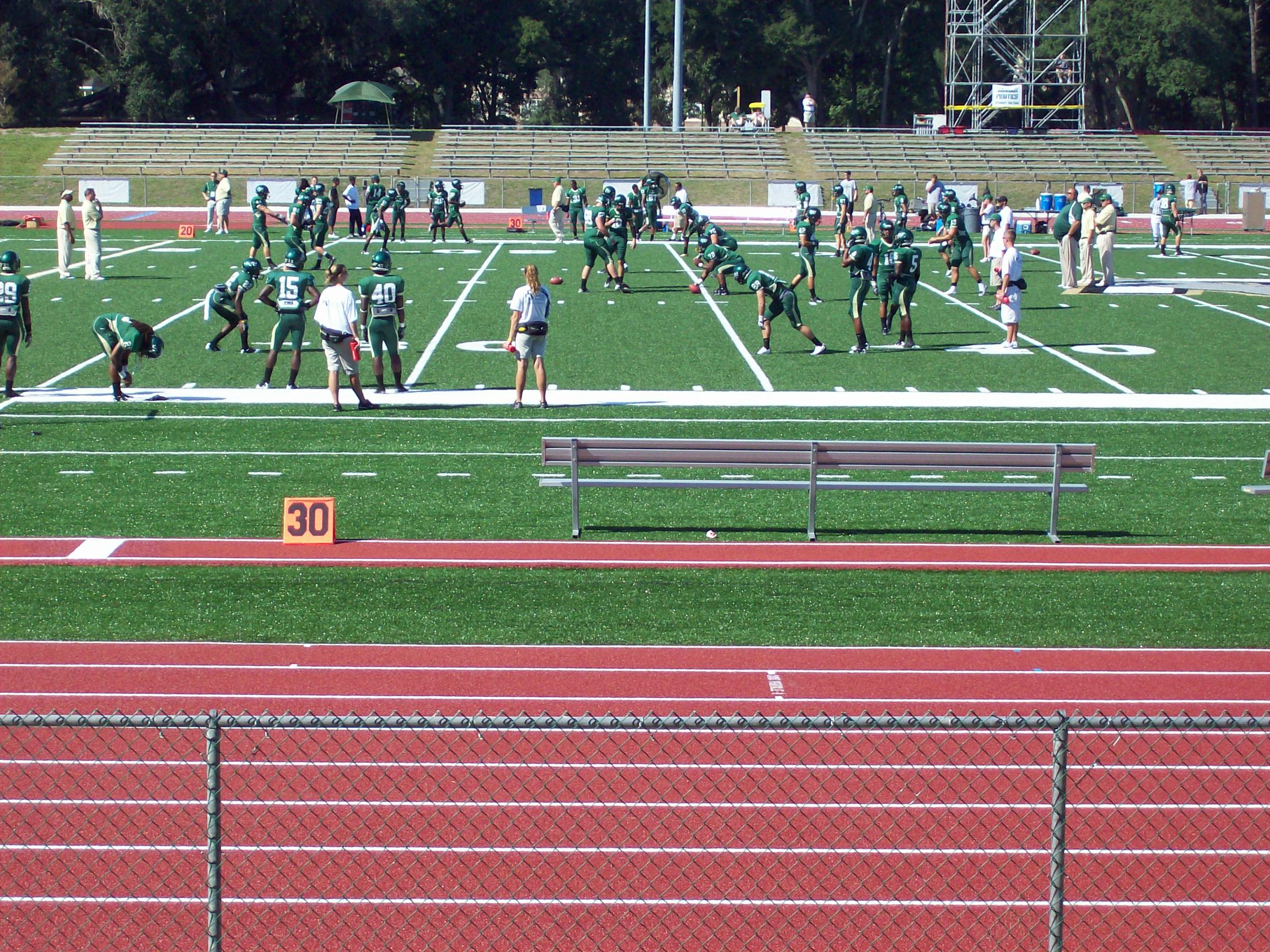
Dolphins football team at practice

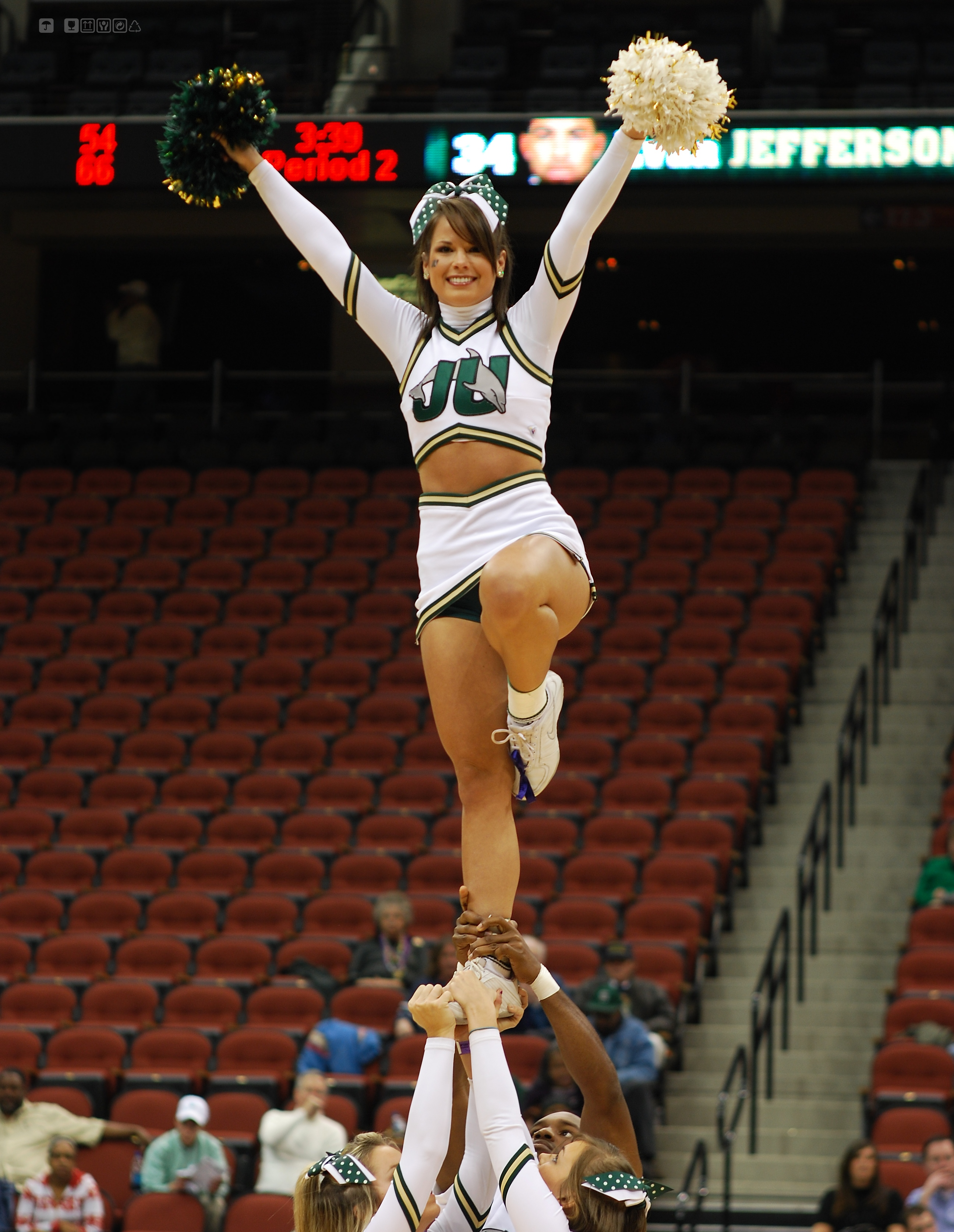
Dolphins cheerleaders performing a liberty stunt at a basketball game

The JU athletic programs participate in NCAA Division I in the ASUN Conference, with the exception of the rowing program, which competes in the MAAC Conference (NCAA Division I).

Terry Alexander, the most successful coach in Jacksonville's baseball history with 631 wins, entered his 31st year at Jacksonville and his 20th year as the program's head coach. He has led the program to nine NCAA regional appearances, won six conference championships (1995, 1999, 2003, 2006, 2007, 2009) and has completed five 40-win seasons. He has also coached 10 All-America honorees, 50 all-conference selections and helped 44 players get drafted by Major League Baseball organizations.

The basketball program has produced professional basketball players such as Artis Gilmore, Otis Smith, Pembrook Burrows III and Rex Morgan. In 1970, Jacksonville University became the second smallest school (behind St. Bonaventure) to make it to the NCAA Final Four and the national championship game. The team was led by head coach Joe Williams. After defeating the St. Bonaventure team in the tournament semi-finals, the Dolphins lost to the UCLA Bruins in the national championship. The following season, Jacksonville became the first college basketball team to average 100+ points per game, at a time when there was no three-point shot and no shot clock in college basketball. In 2009, Jacksonville won the regular season Atlantic Sun Conference title in men's basketball, but fell to East Tennessee State in the conference tournament title game. The Dolphins were invited to the National Invitation Tournament, the school's first post-season tournament since 1986, but lost in the first round to the University of Florida Gators.

The football program began play in 1998, winning its first Pioneer League title in 2008. The Dolphins competed in the Football Championship Series (FCS), where they won two division titles and two conference championships. The university discontinued its football program at the conclusion of the 2019 season.

JU is noted for its rowing program after taking the overall FIRA Cup (Florida Intercollegiate Rowing Association) in 2007 and again in 2014. The women's rowing team won their first MAAC Championship in 2014 and won an automatic bid to the NCAA Div I National Championship (JU Website). Recently, JU has expanded its rowing program with the addition of the Negaard Rowing Center. The JU rowing program has had over 50 years of success around the world and has competed in locations such as the Nile River and England's Henley Royal Regatta.

In 2016 Jacksonville University landed a pair of lacrosse icons to lead its men's lacrosse program. Providence College assistant coach John Galloway was named head coach. One of the young legends in the sport, he was at Providence for four years after spending one year as a volunteer assistant at Duke. He brought along one of the game's most famous players, Casey Powell, as his offensive coordinator.

== Student life ==
Student body composition as of May 2, 2022
Race and ethnicity	Total
White	49%
Black	20%
Hispanic	14%
Foreign national	7%
Other (Note: Other consists of multiracial Americans & those who prefer to not say.)	7%
Asian	2%
Economic diversity
Low-income (Note: The percentage of students who received an income-based federal Pell grant intended for low-income students.)	38%
Affluent (Note: The percentage of students who are a part of the American middle class at the bare minimum.)	62%

The school's Greek system includes fraternities and sororities. While Greeks do offer some social events, many residence halls also host their own events.

There are a variety of campus ministries on campus. In 2011, the Campus to City Wesley Foundation started meeting at JU.

Campus media organizations include the student newspaper (The Navigator), campus radio station (JU108), literary and arts magazine (The Aquarian), student-run broadcasting station (Dolphin Channel), and yearbook (The Riparian), which stopped its publication in 2010.

== Library ==
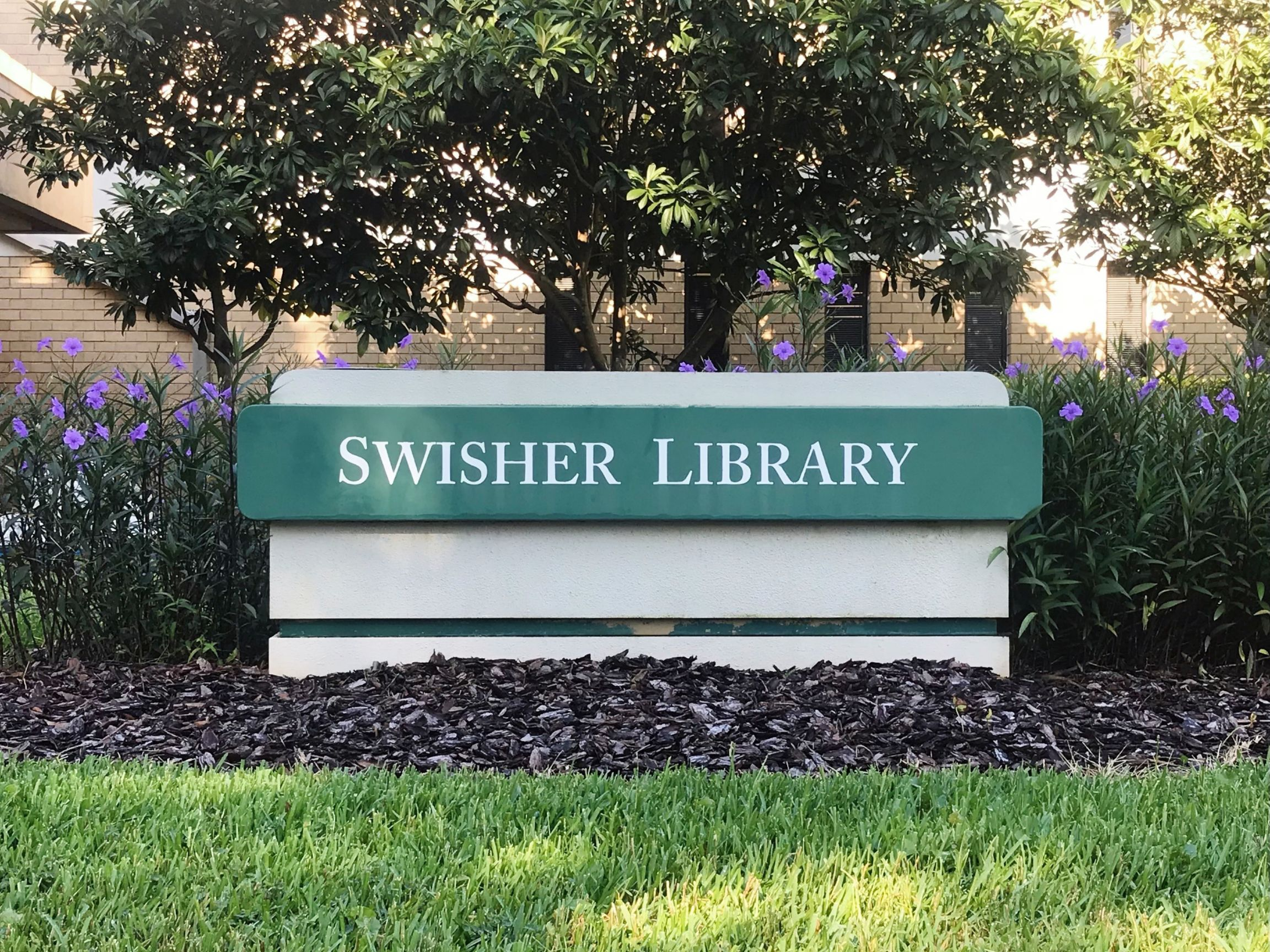
Swisher Library entrance sign

The Carl S. Swisher Library spans over 52,000 square feet and three floors. It offers scenic views of the St. Johns River and is situated in the academic center of campus. This building was funded by a former JU Board of Trustees chair, Carl S. Swisher, who contributed the necessary funds for its construction. The library was built in three phases, with the first phase completed in 1953, the second phase in 1961, and the third phase in 1971. In 1966, then-president of the university, Dr. Robert H. Spiro, established the "Friends of the Library." The library has completed several renovations over the years, the most recent being completed in early 2023.

Today, the Carl S. Swisher Library holds more than 350,000 volumes of books, periodicals, music scores, and other items, as well as a substantial collection of digital resources. The library provides services in support of the university's objectives, including research assistance, instruction sessions, and interlibrary loan services.

In partnership with the university's College of Law and Center for Gender + Sexuality, in March 2023 the Swisher Library became home to the American Bar Association's 19th Amendment exhibit.

== Notable alumni ==
This list of Jacksonville University alumni includes graduates, non-graduate former students and current students of Jacksonville University.

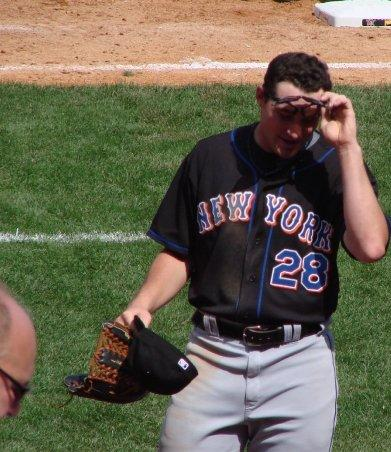
Daniel Murphy

Alumni	Notability
Aaron Bean	United States congressman
Bertice Berry	Sociologist
Alvin Brown	Mayor of Jacksonville, 2011–2015
Dee Brown	NBA player (1990–2002), 1991 NBA All-Star Weekend Slam Dunk Contest winner
Jade Cargill	Fitness model and professional wrestler for WWE, inaugural AEW TBS Champion
David "Jack" Dorsett	Director of Naval Intelligence, vice admiral, US Navy
Alex Farmer	Bishop of the Anglican Gulf Atlantic Diocese
William Forsythe	Dancer and choreographer
Paul G. Gaffney II	President of Monmouth University
Artis Gilmore	ABA player (1971–1976), NBA player (1976–1988), Naismith Memorial Basketball Hall of Fame inductee (2011)
Michael Hackett	Basketball player, Liga Profesional de Baloncesto MVP in 1984, and Israeli League Top Scorer in 1991
Donnie Hammond	Professional golfer
Tommy Hazouri	Former mayor of Jacksonville (1987–1991), Duval County School Board member (2004–2012), Jacksonville City Council member (2015–2021)
Bruce Helford	Television producer (The Drew Carey Show, George Lopez)
Stan Jordan	Florida state representative (2000–2008), Duval County School Board member (1984–2000, 2008–2009)
Russell Knox	Professional golfer
Smoke Laval	College baseball coach of Louisiana–Monroe, LSU, and North Florida
Terrence Mann	Actor, director, singer, songwriter and dancer
Tom McMillan	Former Major League Baseball shortstop and member of the inaugural 1977 Seattle Mariners team
Daniel Murphy	Major League Baseball player for the Colorado Rockies (previously with New York Mets, Washington Nationals, Chicago Cubs)
Frank Pace	Television producer
Micah Ross	Former NFL player with the Jacksonville Jaguars, San Diego Chargers, and Carolina Panthers
Leonard Skinner	Namesake of Southern rock band Lynyrd Skynyrd, basketball player
Otis Smith	NBA player (1986–1992), former general manager of the Orlando Magic
Gary Tabach	Retired United States Navy captain, the first Soviet-born citizen to be commissioned an officer in the Armed Forces of the United States
Jay Thomas	Film and TV actor, radio show host
David Walker	Former comptroller general of the United States
Will W. Weatherford	Former Florida state representative and speaker of the Florida House
Jack Williams	Journalist and founding editor of the USA Today weather page
John A. Wright	Oklahoma state representative, unsuccessful candidate for lieutenant governor

== List of university presidents ==
No.	Term	Portrait	Name	Background	Education
1	1934–1937		William J. Porter	Former judge of the Duval County Criminal Court of Record	
2	1939–1940		Francis A. Waterhouse	Former professor at Dartmouth College and the University of Pennsylvania	Harvard University (AB, MA, PhD)
3	1944–1951		Garth H. Akridge	Director of Vocational Education for Miami-Dade County Public Schools	University of Central Arkansas (BA), Columbia University (MA, PhD)
4	1951–1956		Paul L. Johnson	Professor at Phoenix Junior College	Central Missouri College (BA), Columbia University (MS, PhD)
5	1956–1963		Franklyn A. Johnson	Former International Studies professor and World War II veteran	Harvard University
6	1964–1979		Robert H. Spiro Jr.	Former dean of liberal arts at Mercer University	Wheaton College (BA)
7	1980–1989		Frances B. Kinne	Founding dean of the Jacksonville University College of Fine Arts	Drake University (BA, MA), University of Frankfurt (PhD)
8	1989–1996		James J. Brady	Economist and former left-handed pitcher in professional baseball	University of Notre Dame
9	1996–2000		Paul S. Tipton	Former president of Spring Hill College	Spring Hill College (BA)
10	2000–2004		David L. Harlow	Former chancellor of Rhodes College	George Washington University (MBA)
11	2004–2013		Kerry D. Romesburg	Former president of Nevada State College and Utah Valley State College	Arizona State University (BS, MS, PhD)
12	2013–present		Tim P. Cost	Former EVP of Global Corporate Affairs of PepsiCo	Jacksonville University (BS), University of Rochester (MBA)
