= First Baptist Church (Columbia, Missouri) =

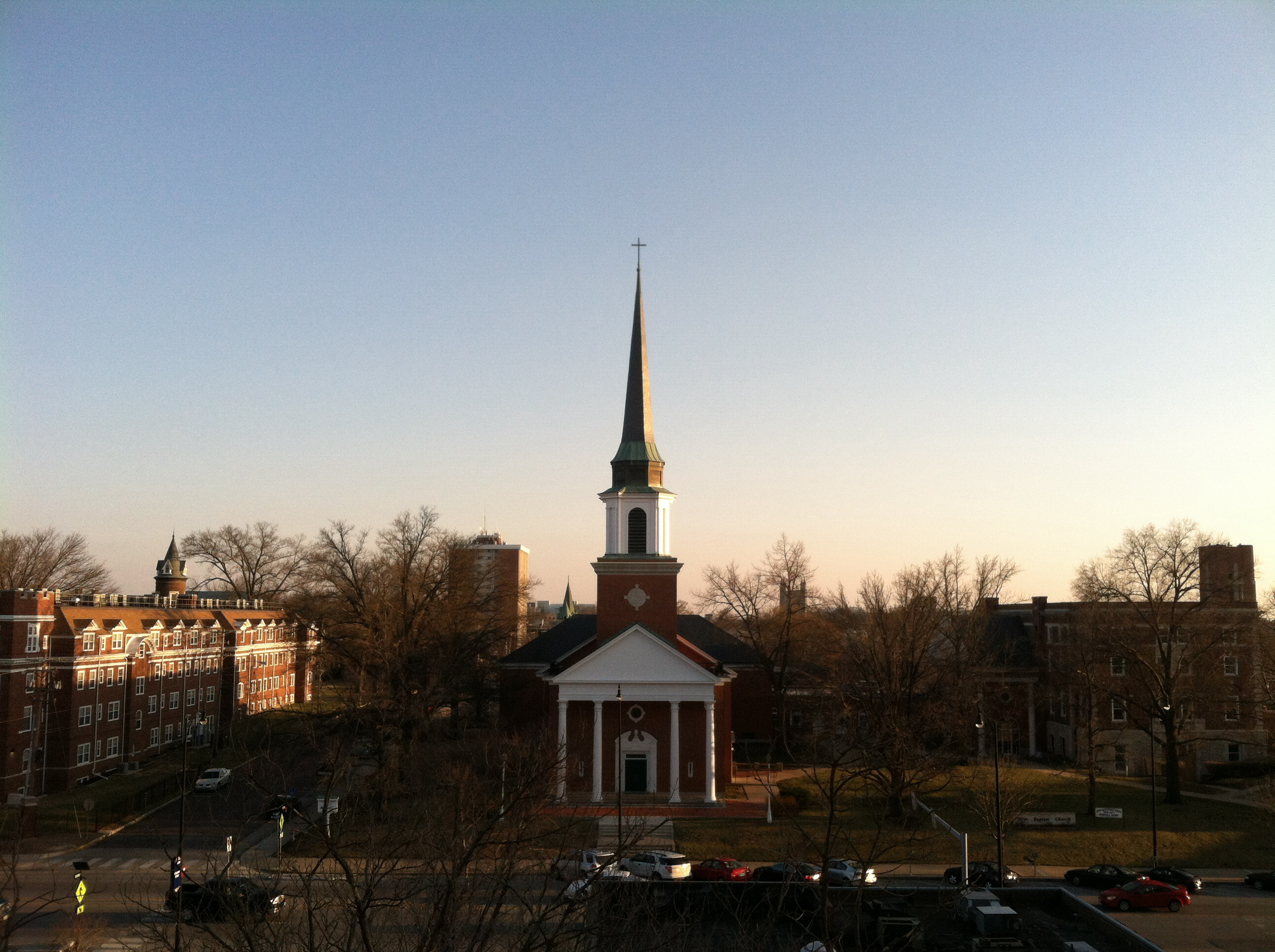
- The sanctuary from the North at dusk

- Location within Missouri
- 38°57′3.8088″N 92°19′26.43″W
- Location: Columbia, Missouri
- Country: United States
- Denomination: American Baptist Churches USA, Cooperative Baptist Fellowship
- Previous denomination: Southern Baptist Convention
- Website: http://fbc-columbia.org/

History
- Founded: 22 November 1823
- Founder: William Jewell

Architecture
- Style: Colonial Revival
- Completed: 1957

Clergy
- Pastor(s): Kristin McAtee, Senior Pastor; Brittany McDonald Null, Pastor of Families & Spiritual Formation; Hayden Dennis, Pastor of Youth and Community

Columbia was founded in 1818 as the county seat of Boone County. A hallmark of frontier life in the Boonslick was a lack of organized religion.[3] As Columbia was growing into a proper town, it was natural that like-minded thinkers would join together in Christian fellowship. First Baptist Church was organized on 22 November 1823 in the home of Charles Hardin, Sr. on Locust street between 4th and 5th streets, now Flat Branch Park. This was the first brick residence Columbia. The founders were formerly members of Little Bonne Femme Baptist Church south of Columbia who were granted letters of dismiss after a dispute involving William Jewell.[9] The church continued to meet in homes or outside in fair weather until September 1828 when the church met regularly in the Boone County Courthouse until 1836. In 1836 the first dedicated church building was constructed, known at the Union Church, as a cooperative effort between William Jewell, a founder of FBC, and Moses Payne, a Methodist minister, who funded the construction. This building was used for twenty years.

A new church building was erected in the 1856 on the grounds of the Boone County Courthouse. The congregation continued to worship here for 35 years. In 1891 the church moved to its current location, purchasing a lot on Broadway next to Stephens College. On this lot was erected a beautiful Victorian Neo-Gothic structure, complete with pipe organ and stained glass. In 1927 the addition of the extant educational building was added. Limited seating capacity, poor upkeep and a minor roof fire in the 1951 lead to the destruction of the sanctuary and its replacement In 1957 with the current sanctuary. This new sanctuary was connected to the educational building in the 1960s.

The founders of Columbia were from the Upland South, largely Virginia, Kentucky, and Tennessee. As such, many founders and members of the congregation were enslavers. Charles Hardin, Hannah Jewell Hardin, Hiram Phillips, William Ridgeway and William Jewell were all enslavers. Until the civil war it was common for slaves to join their masters church although with their masters permission. Not until after the Civil War did black members of the congregation segregate. In Columbia, newly emancipated slaves from First Baptist formed Second Missionary Baptist Church—still a predominantly black church today.

The Stephens family, leaders in business, religion, and civic affairs, were lifetime members. This includes both Edwin William Stephens and his son James L. Stephens, namesake of Stephens College. The college's historical quad sits across Waugh Street. William Jewell was instrumental in securing Columbia as the location for the new University of Missouri.

== Notable members ==
- William Jewell
- Charles Henry Hardin
- John C. Merrill
- Edwin William Stephens
