= John C. Merrill =

American academic

John Calhoun Merrill (9 January 1924 – 20 September 2012) was an American author and professor of journalism. He was professor emeritus at the University of Missouri School of Journalism, and taught at a number of other colleges and universities, and was the author of 30 books and over 100 articles in journals, and has been considered one of the leading scholars in journalism during his time. In 2007, a festschrift, Freedom Fighter, was issued in his honor.

== Biography ==
Merrill was born January 9, 1924, in Eden, Mississippi, and served in the US Navy from 1942 to 1946. He met his wife at Delta State University, where he graduated from in 1949. He went on to receive a master's degree at Louisiana State University, and a Ph.D. in mass communications from the University of Iowa in 1961. His first teaching position was at Northwestern State College from 1951 to 1962, after which he moved to Columbia in order to teach at the Missouri School of Journalism at the University of Missouri.

Merrill served as chair of Journalism at Northwestern State University. He also served as a faculty member at various universities including Texas A&M, the University of Maryland, the University of Virginia, California State-Long Beach, the University of North Carolina and University of Missouri. He taught and lectured in 70 countries including Singapore, Taiwan, South Korea and Egypt.

Merrill was awarded the Distinguished Research Master at Louisiana State University in 1991. He received the Missouri Honor Medal for Distinguished Service in Journalism in 1996. He was inducted into the School of Journalism Hall of Fame at the University of Iowa (2005) and the Ethics Hall of Fame at Texas Christian University (2006). He was called "a national institution and treasure in the field of journalism in the United States."

He was an active member of First Baptist Church in Columbia, and had five children with his wife Dorothy.

He died on September 20, 2012, in Birmingham, Alabama, at age 88.

== Selected works ==
- Handbook of the Foreign Press (1955)
- Gringo: The U.S. As Seen By Mexican Journalists (1963)
- The Foreign Press (with C. Bryan and M. Alisky; 1964)
- The Elite Press (1968)
- International Communication (with H.D. Fischer; 1970)
- Dimensions Of Christian Writing (with D. Bell; 1970)
- Media, Messages & Men (with R. Lowenstein; 1971)
- The Imperative of Freedom (1974)
- Ethics and the Press (with R. Barney; 1975)
- International & Intercultural Communication (with H.D. Fischer; 1976)
- Existential Journalism (1977)
- The World's Great Dailies (with Harold Fisher; 1980)
- Philosophy--and Journalism (with Jack O'Dell; 1983)
- Global Journalism: A Survey of the World's Media (1983)
- Basic Issues in Mass Communication (with E. Dennis; 1984)
- The Dialectic in Journalism (1989)
- Modern Mass Media (with J. Lee and J. Friedlander; 1990)
- Macromedia: Mission, Message, and Morality (with R. Lowenstein; 1990)
- Media Debates (with E. Dennis; 1991)
- Journalism Ethics: Philosophical Foundations for Journalists (1997)
- Legacy of Wisdom: Great Thinkers and Journalism (1994)
- Media Controversies (with D. Gordon, C. Reuss and Mike Kittross; 1995)
- The Princely Press: Machiavelli on American Journalism (1998)
- Twilight of Press Freedom: Rise of People's Journalism (2000)
