= Thomas V. Morris =

American philosopher

Thomas V. Morris (born 1952), is an American philosopher. He is a former professor of philosophy at the University of Notre Dame, Indiana. He is a founder of the Morris Institute for Human Values, and author of several books. He is also a business and motivational speaker, applying philosophical themes and concepts to business and professional life.

Morris's work explores the 20th century's focus on technical efforts in analytic philosophy as having given philosophy the image of an arcane or irrelevant endeavor. His work often has the aim of making philosophy widely accessible, rediscovering the practical side of philosophy, and introducing people to the themes and philosophers.

== Early life ==
Morris was born and grew up in North Carolina. He graduated from the University of North Carolina at Chapel Hill, where he was a Morehead Scholar, and holds a Ph.D. in Philosophy and Religious Studies from Yale University. UNC has honored him with the "Distinguished Young Alumnus Award".

== Academia ==
Morris has made many academic contributions to the philosophy of religion and theology. For fifteen years Morris served as a professor of philosophy at the University of Notre Dame. One of his earliest publications in philosophical theology was The Logic of God Incarnate (1986). Other academic publications include Anselmian Explorations: Essays in Philosophical Theology (1987), Divine and Human Action: Essays in the Metaphysics of Theism (1988), Philosophy and the Christian Faith (1988), Our Idea of God (1991), and God and the Philosophers: The Reconciliation of Faith and Reason.

== Popular philosophy and motivational speaking ==
Morris' books include Francis Schaeffer's Apologetics: A Critique, Understanding Identity Statements, The Logic of God Incarnate, Anselmian Explorations, The Concept of God, Our Idea of God, The Bluffer's Guide to Philosophy, Philosophy and the Christian Faith, Divine and Human Action, Making Sense of It All, God and the Philosophers, Philosophy for Dummies, True Success, The Art of Achievement, If Aristotle Ran General Motors, The Stoic Art of Living, Twisdom: Twitter Wisdom, Superheroes and Philosophy, If Harry Potter Ran General Electric, Socrates in Silicon Valley, Plato's Lemonade Stand, The Everyday Patriot: How to be a Great American Now, Stocism for Dummies (with Gregory Bassham), and eight philosophical novels in a series, set in Egypt in 1934-1935,beginning with The Oasis Within, and continuing with The Golden Palace, The Stone of Giza, The Viper and the Storm, The King and Prince, The Mysterious Village, The Magic Ring, and The Ancient Scroll.

Morris continued to popularize philosophy and foster reflections on life and its meaning in his works: Philosophy for Dummies, True Success, If Aristotle Ran General Motors (1998), The Art of Achievement, and The Stoic Art of Living, in which he applies the ideas of Epictetus, Seneca and Marcus Aurelius to contemporary life.

Castellano et al. describe If Aristotle Ran General Motors as "compelling" and "persuasive" in arguing that in addition to codes of conduct and ethical guidelines, the creation of an ethical workplace climate requires "socially harmonious relationships" to be embedded in practice.

Morris is the founder and chairman of the Morris Institute for Human Values, based in Wilmington, North Carolina.

== See also ==
- American philosophy
- List of American philosophers
