= Tim Cost =

American executive

12th President of Jacksonville University
- Incumbent
- Assumed office February 1, 2013
- Preceded by: Kerry D. Romesburg

Personal details
- Born: Syracuse, New York, United States
- Education: Jacksonville University (BA); University of Rochester (MBA)

Timothy P. Cost is an American academic administrator and former corporate executive who is serving as the President of Jacksonville University since 2013. During his tenure, the university established the College of Law and created a partnership with the Lake Erie College of Osteopathic Medicine.

== Early life and education ==
Cost was born near Syracuse, New York. He enrolled at Jacksonville University in 1977 on an athletic scholarship and was an accomplished baseball player for the Jacksonville Dolphins, pitching the university's only 9-inning no-hitter in its history. Cost graduated with a BA from Jacksonville University in 1981 and earned an MBA from the University of Rochester in 1990.

== Career ==
Prior to joining Jacksonville University, Cost held executive positions at PepsiCo, APCO Worldwide, Wyeth, Eastman Kodak, Bristol-Myers Squibb, Aramark, Johnson & Johnson, and Pfizer. Jacksonville University has debuted programs and campus expansions during his tenure, including creating a law school. Cost is credited with driving $121 million in fundraising, and has overseen campus renovations and construction.

Cost serves on the board of the Jacksonville Branch of the Federal Reserve Bank of Atlanta. He has been held leadership roles with the Jacksonville Civic Council and the JAXUSA Partnership.

In April 2025, Cost faced a faculty vote of no confidence following the announcement of significant cost-cutting measures. These included the elimination of 40 faculty positions, reduction of undergraduate programs from 60 to 37, and consolidation of graduate programs from 23 to 15. Faculty members criticized Cost for terminating tenured professors without cause, lacking transparency in financial matters, and bypassing shared governance protocols. Despite the faculty's dissent, the university's Board of Trustees expressed full confidence in Cost's leadership.

== Personal life ==
Cost is married to Stephanie Cost, and they have two children, Melanie and Drew.
