= Sara Lockwood Williams =

American journalist

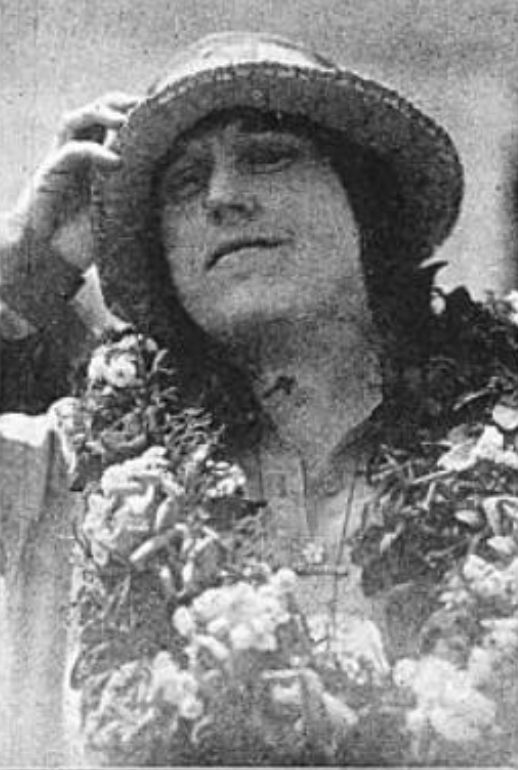
- Williams wearing a flower lei, from a 1929 publication
- Born: Sara Lawrence Lockwood; April 13, 1889; Rock Port, Missouri, U.S.
- Died: July 6, 1961 (aged 72); Columbia, Missouri, U.S.
- Occupations: Journalist, professor, clubwoman
- Spouse: Walter Williams

Sara Lawrence Lockwood Williams (April 13, 1889 – July 6, 1961) was an American journalist and clubwoman. She was the first woman in the United States to be a professor at a school of journalism, first woman reporter at the St. Joseph Gazette, and one of the first female graduates of the Missouri School of Journalism. She was national president of Theta Sigma Phi, a professional organization for women in journalism, in the 1920s.

== Early life and education ==
Lockwood was born in Rock Port, Missouri and raised in Columbia, Missouri, the daughter of John Lockwood and Mary Jane Duncan Lockwood. She graduated from the Missouri School of Journalism in 1913, and earned a master's degree there in 1931.

== Career ==
Lockwood was society editor and feature writer at the St. Joseph Gazette by the time she graduated from university. She was a founding member of the St. Joseph Press Club, and a president of the Missouri Women's Press Club. She was also president of Theta Sigma Phi, a national organization for women in journalism. She organized the reading room and archive of the University of Missouri's journalism program. From 1916 to 1918 she was women's page editor for the Tulsa Times and Democrat. She worked at the Philadelphia Evening Public Ledger from 1918 to 1921. In the summer of 1927 she worked temporarily at the Honolulu Star-Bulletin.

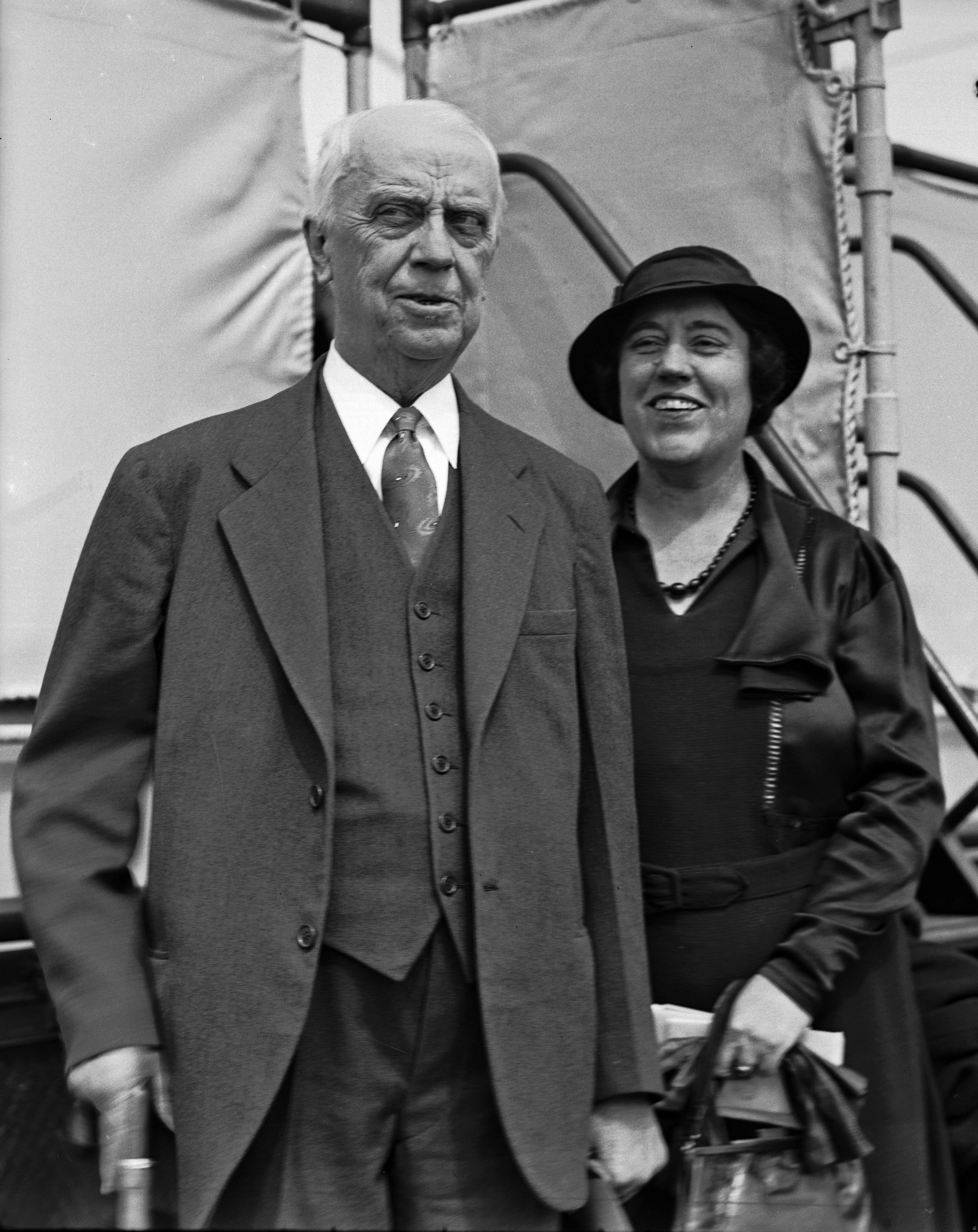
Williams and her husband in San Pedro, California, in 1934 (Los Angeles Times)

In 1921 Lockwood became a professor at the Missouri School of Journalism, the first woman to hold a professorship at an American journalism school. This work ended in 1927, when she married the school's dean and could not continue in paid employment at the university. She addressed the American Association of Teachers of Journalism at their 1929 meeting in Baton Rouge, and traveled to international journalism conferences with her husband, including gatherings in Paris, Berlin, and London.

After her husband's death in 1935, Williams was a visiting professor at Yenching University in China. She hosted a weekly radio program in St. Louis, "Sara Lockwood Williams’ Scrapbook", in 1936 and 1937. She taught at Texas College of Arts and Industries from 1938 to 1939. From 1944 to 1951 she was director of public relations at Rockford College in Illinois. In 1951 she returned to Missouri; she taught at the journalism school and edited Journalism Alumni News.

== Publications ==
- Twenty Years of Education for Journalism (1929)
- "Pioneer Days in 'Old Sparta'" (1931)
- The Biography of a Country Weekly

== Personal life ==
Lockwood married fellow Missouri journalist Walter Williams in 1927; he died from cancer in 1935. She died from cancer in 1961, at the age of 72, in Columbia, Missouri. Her papers, including diaries, radio scripts, and correspondence, are in the State Historical Society of Missouri.
