= Mike Shaw (Alabama politician) =

American politician

Member of the Alabama House of Representatives from the 47th district
- Incumbent
- Assumed office November 9, 2022
- Preceded by: David Wheeler

Personal details
- Party: Republican
- Spouse: Shelley
- Children: 2
- Education: Auburn University (BA)

Mike Shaw is an American politician who has served as a Republican member of the Alabama House of Representatives since November 8, 2022. He represents Alabama's 47th House district.

== Early and education ==
Shaw and his family have lived in Hoover City since 2001. He graduated from Vestavia Hills High School in 1990. He earned a Bachelor of Arts in public administration from Auburn University in 1995.

== Political career ==
Shaw started his political career in 2016 when he became a member of the Hoover City Council. He was also re-elected in 2020. On November 8, 2022, he was elected into the 2022 Alabama House of Representatives election against Democratic opponent Christian Coleman with 64 percent votes. He assumed office the next day on November 9, 2022. Upon taking office, he resigned from his City Council position immediately.

== Professional career ==
Shaw served as the Chief technology officer of Mutual Savings Credit Union since 2004. He is a Certified Information Systems Security Professional and he started the Hoover Technology Round Table that comprises technological companies and professionals around the city. He is a member of Birmingham Tech board of directors. He is also a songwriter, he had released four albums that has won awards such as the Billboard Songwriting Contest, International Songwriting Competition and KCCM song of the year. .

== Elections ==
=== Hoover City Council, Place 4 ===
==== 2016 General Election ====
2016 General Election
Candidate	Votes	%	±
Mike Shaw	7,986	66.0	
Michael Holt	4,205	34.0	
Total votes	12,191	100.0	

==== 2020 General Election ====
2020 General Election
Candidate	Votes	%	±
Mike Shaw	9,472	77.0	
Nathan Reed	2,840	23.0	
Total votes	12,312	100.0	

=== Alabama House of Representatives District 47 ===
==== 2022 General Election ====
2022 General Election
Party	Candidate	Votes	%
Republican	Mike Shaw	8,582	64.1
Democratic	Christian Coleman	4,815	35.9
Total votes		13,397	100.0

Alabama House of Representatives
Preceded by David Wheeler	Member of the Alabama House of Representatives; 2022–present	Succeeded by incumbent
