= Jemison, Alabama =

City in Alabama, United States

Jemison
- City
- Seal
- Motto: Community - Government - Agriculture
- Location of Jemison in Chilton County, Alabama.
- Coordinates: 32°58′12″N 86°44′37″W
- Country: United States
- State: Alabama
- County: Chilton

Area
  - Total: 11.42 sq mi (29.57 km^{2})
  - Land: 11.34 sq mi (29.38 km^{2})
  - Water: 0.073 sq mi (0.19 km^{2})
- Elevation: 709 ft (216 m)

Population (2020)
  - Total: 2,642
  - Density: 232.9/sq mi (89.91/km^{2})
- Time zone: UTC-6 (Central (CST))
  - Summer (DST): UTC-5 (CDT)
- ZIP code: 35085
- Area codes: 205, 659
- FIPS code: 01-38608
- GNIS feature ID: 2404801
- Website: www.jemisonalabama.org

Jemison is a city in Chilton County, Alabama, United States. At the 2020 census, the population was 2,642. The center of population of Alabama is located outside of Jemison, an area known as Jemison Division.

== Geography ==
Jemison is located in northern Chilton County. According to the U.S. Census Bureau, the town has a total area of 11.3 square miles (29.2 km^{2}), of which 11.2 square miles (29.0 km^{2}) is land and 0.077 square miles (0.2 km^{2}), or 0.65%, is water.

== History ==
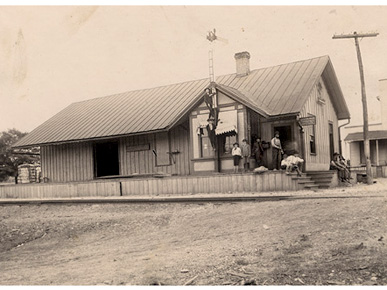
Jemison train station in 1907

Jemison is located at the geological end of the Appalachians and was originally inhabited by the Creek Indians for the springs located in the area. In 1869, R.J. Langston built the first house in area and it was made famous by stagecoach drivers who would stop to rest on their travels between North and South Alabama, calling the area Langston Station, or Langstonville, later known as "Jemison Springs", and finally, Jemison. Population began growing by 1870 after the completion of the railroad passing through the town as part of the L&N Railroad. Construction originally began on the railroad in February 1854, but was halted then destroyed due to the Civil War.

Responsible for building the segment of track that would run through Langston Station, Col. John T. Milner suggested the name "Jemison" for the area, after the successful Tuscaloosa businessman, Col. Robert Jemison, who based a stagecoach line in Langston Station. Col. Jemison was also responsible for much of the construction of the Alabama-Chattanooga Railroad. In 1870 a post office was established, and the city of Jemison would be incorporated once in 1907, then reincorporated with a new charter in 1919.

== Demographics ==
Historical population
Census	Pop.	Note	%±
1880	102		—
1900	245		—
1910	413		68.6%
1920	419		1.5%
1930	459		9.5%
1940	456		−0.7%
1950	847		85.7%
1960	977		15.3%
1970	1,423		45.6%
1980	1,828		28.5%
1990	1,898		3.8%
2000	2,248		18.4%
2010	2,585		15.0%
2020	2,642		2.2%
U.S. Decennial Census; 2013 Estimate

=== 2020 census ===
As of the 2020 census, Jemison had a population of 2,642. The median age was 40.6 years. 22.9% of residents were under the age of 18 and 18.1% of residents were 65 years of age or older. For every 100 females there were 92.8 males, and for every 100 females age 18 and over there were 88.7 males age 18 and over.

0.0% of residents lived in urban areas, while 100.0% lived in rural areas.

There were 1,123 housing units, of which 7.7% were vacant. The homeowner vacancy rate was 0.3% and the rental vacancy rate was 7.9%.

There were 1,037 households in Jemison, of which 733 were families. 31.1% had children under the age of 18 living in them. Of all households, 48.8% were married-couple households, 16.9% were households with a male householder and no spouse or partner present, and 29.2% were households with a female householder and no spouse or partner present. About 25.3% of all households were made up of individuals and 11.4% had someone living alone who was 65 years of age or older.

Racial composition as of the 2020 census
Race	Number	Percent
White	1,965	74.4%
Black or African American	402	15.2%
American Indian and Alaska Native	10	0.4%
Asian	6	0.2%
Native Hawaiian and Other Pacific Islander	1	0.0%
Some other race	140	5.3%
Two or more races	118	4.5%
Hispanic or Latino (of any race)	212	8.0%

=== 2010 census ===
As of the census of 2010, there were 2,585 people, 997 households, and 733 families residing in the city. The population density was 231 inhabitants per square mile (89/km^{2}). There were 1,096 housing units at an average density of 97.0 per square mile (37.5/km^{2}). The racial makeup of the city was 77.8% White, 17.7% Black or African American, 0.1% Native American, 0.1% Asian, 3.1% from other races, and 1.0% from two or more races. 7.0% of the population were Hispanic or Latino of any race.

There were 997 households, out of which 30.5% had children under the age of 18 living with them, 53.0% were married couples living together, 15.1% had a female householder with no husband present, and 26.5% were non-families. 23.3% of all households were made up of individuals, and 9.7% had someone living alone who was 65 years of age or older. The average household size was 2.59 and the average family size was 3.04.

In the city the population was spread out, with 25.2% under the age of 18, 8.0% from 18 to 24, 25.8% from 25 to 44, 26.9% from 45 to 64, and 14.1% who were 65 years of age or older. The median age was 38.7 years. For every 100 females, there were 94.9 males. For every 100 females age 18 and over, there were 94.9 males.

The median income for a household in the city was $40,735, and the median income for a family was $49,091. Males had a median income of $45,082 versus $31,588 for females. The per capita income for the city was $17,300. About 12.8% of families and 15.8% of the population were below the poverty line, including 23.4% of those under age 18 and 6.3% of those age 65 or over.

== Schools ==
=== Jemison Elementary School ===
As of 2006, Jemison Elementary School enrollment exceed 900 students, making it the largest school in Chilton County. It ranks scholastically among the best of Alabama's schools. Students are taught from Kindergarten through grade 3 at JES.

=== Jemison Intermediate School ===
Jemison Intermediate School is the newest addition to the Chilton County School System located in Jemison, AL. JIS teaches grades 4-6. Their Mission Statement is to provide a positive and safe learning environment for their students to reach their full academic potential.

=== Jemison Middle School ===
Grades 7 and 8 are taught at Jemison Middle School.

=== Jemison High School ===
Jemison High School was built in 1963, where approximately 800 students are enrolled. Grades 8–12 are taught at Jemison High School. The school's mascot is black panther, and their Mission Statement is "to provide a secure, positive and encouraging environment, enabling students to develop essential academic and independent living skills."

=== Chilton Christian Academy ===
Chilton Christian Academy was founded in 1977 by members of the Victory Baptist Church located on HWY 31 in Jemison, AL. It is a faith/religion based, private education institution. The school instructs students from Kindergarten through grade 12, and has a variety of athletic and extra curricular organizations.

== Transportation ==
Chilton County Transit provides dial-a-ride bus transit service to the city.

== Notable people ==
- Sheldon Fitts (1899–1985), player for the 1920 Georgia Bulldogs football team
- Ruby Sales (born 1948), African-American social activist
- Winston M. Scott (1909–1971), Central Intelligence Agency officer
- David Wheeler (1950–2022), Alabama state representative
- Reynolds Wolf (born 1970), meteorologist and journalist
