= Alexander Brest Museum and Gallery =

- Location within Florida
- Location: 2800 University Boulevard North, Jacksonville, FL
- Coordinates: 30.351786°N 81.602783°W
- Type: Art museum
- Website: www.ju.edu/art/alexander-brest-gallery.php

The Alexander Brest Museum and Gallery is located in the Phillips Fine Arts Building on the campus of Jacksonville University. It was named for its primary benefactor. The museum featured collections of carved ivory, Pre-Columbian artifacts, Steuben glass, Chinese porcelain, Cloisonné, Tiffany glass, and Boehm porcelain as well as rotating exhibitions.

The Alexander Brest Gallery is a 2300 square foot exhibition space. The gallery showcases artists working in various art mediums alongside emerging Jacksonville University student artists and designers. The gallery selected its first Gallery Director, artist and curator Zakriya Rabani, in 2023.
