= Walter B. Williams =

American politician

Member of the Washington Senate
- In office 1963–1971

Member of the Washington House of Representatives
- In office 1961–1963

Personal details
- Died: November 9, 2006 Seattle, Washington, U.S.
- Party: Republican
- Education: University of Washington; Harvard Law School

Walter B. Williams (died November 9, 2006) was an American politician who served as a member of the Washington House of Representatives from 1961 to 1963 and a member of the Washington State Senate from 1963 to 1971. He died on November 9, 2006, in Seattle, Washington.
