= Code of Conduct for Justices of the Supreme Court of the United States =

Code of conduct for the highest court of the United States, released November 13, 2023

- Presented: November 13, 2023
- Date effective: November 13, 2023
- Signatories: John Roberts, Clarence Thomas, Samuel Alito, Sonia Sotomayor, Elena Kagan, Neil Gorsuch, Brett Kavanaugh, Amy Barrett, Ketanji Jackson
- Subject: Code of Conduct

Full text
- Code of Conduct for Justices of the Supreme Court of the United States at Wikisource

The Code of Conduct for Justices of the Supreme Court of the United States was issued on November 13, 2023, to set "ethics rules and principles that guide the conduct" of the members of the Supreme Court. It is the first time in its history that the court has adopted a code of conduct.

The 14-page document defined five canons of conduct, discussing issues of receiving gifts, disqualification, and the participation of justices in outside activities such as speaking and teaching. The code has received criticism for being relatively weak compared to the rest of the judicial, legislative, and executive branches while lacking enforcement mechanisms.

== Background ==
The code was issued during a time when the court faced great criticism, especially around the conduct of justice Clarence Thomas. It was shown that he received undisclosed gifts of luxury travel and that he was involved with cases that were related to the political activities of his wife, Ginni Thomas, who worked to overturn the 2020 Presidential Election results in the weeks leading up to the January 6 Capitol attack.

On June 20, 2023, ProPublica published an exposé of Samuel Alito's relationship with billionaire businessman Paul Singer, focusing on a trip Alito and Singer took to a luxury fishing resort in Alaska and suggesting Alito "violated a federal law that requires justices to disclose most gifts", such as private jet travel. The article said he should have recused himself in cases involving Singer and that he was obligated to disclose certain benefits as gifts on his 2008 Financial Disclosure Report. Legal ethics experts quoted in ProPublica called Alito's behavior "unacceptable".

The ProPublica report on unreported gifts to both Alito and Thomas led several members of Congress to call for ethics reform for the Supreme Court, including a Senate Judiciary Committee proposal to establish a code of ethics for the Court.

== Content ==
The Code of Conduct consists of five basic "canons", which include:

1. A Justice Should Uphold the Integrity and Independence of the Judiciary.
2. A Justice Should Avoid Impropriety and the Appearance of Impropriety in All Activities.
3. A Justice Should Perform the Duties of Office Fairly, Impartially, and Diligently.
4. A Justice May Engage in Extrajudicial Activities Consistent with the Obligations of the Judicial Office.
5. A Justice Should Refrain from Political Activity.

== Reactions ==
A number of sitting justices have expressed public support for the adoption of a code of conduct, including Elena Kagan, Brett Kavanaugh, and Amy Coney Barrett. Some critics of the Court's ethics have acknowledged the Code as a significant first step toward improving the Court's conduct and perception.

=== Criticism ===
The code has been criticized for lacking enforcement mechanisms and being self-policed. ProPublica compared the lack of a process to the one for lower-court judges that are subject to an oversight panel of other judges who review their actions against a separate Code of Conduct for federal judges. ProPublica also described the new rules as being in many ways more lenient than the ones for the legislative and the executive branches. Others have criticized the court's denial of past wrongdoing in the new code, which might work to legitimize some of the scandals from the past and future.
