= Jack Williams (outlaws) =

Jack Williams was the name of two Old West outlaws. The first was hanged and the second, upon his appearance, became known as Jack William's Ghost or The Ghost Robber.
