= National Newspaper Association =

American newspaper trade association

- Formation: 1885
- Founded: February 19, 1885
- Founder: Benjamin Briggs Herbert
- Type: Trade association
- Purpose: The mission of the National Newspaper Association is to protect, promote and enhance America's community newspapers.
- Headquarters: Pensacola, Florida
- Region served: United States
- Executive Director: Lynne Lance
- Website: nna.org

The National Newspaper Association (NNA) is a Pensacola, Florida–based non-profit newspaper trade association founded in 1885. A historical marker commemorates its history. It published the National Printer - Journalist. Founder Benjamin Briggs Herbert was quoted as telling a newspaper editor seeking his guidance, "The most important single thing you can do to make your paper successful is to help your community."

== History ==
The National Newspaper Association was conceived in 1882 by Benjamin Briggs Herbert of Red Wing, Minnesota who published the Advance and the Republican. It was founded February 19, 1885, as the National Editorial Association (NEA) in New Orleans, Louisiana. The NEA's constitution was ratified after a meeting in 1886 and Benjamin Briggs Herbert was elected president of the organization.

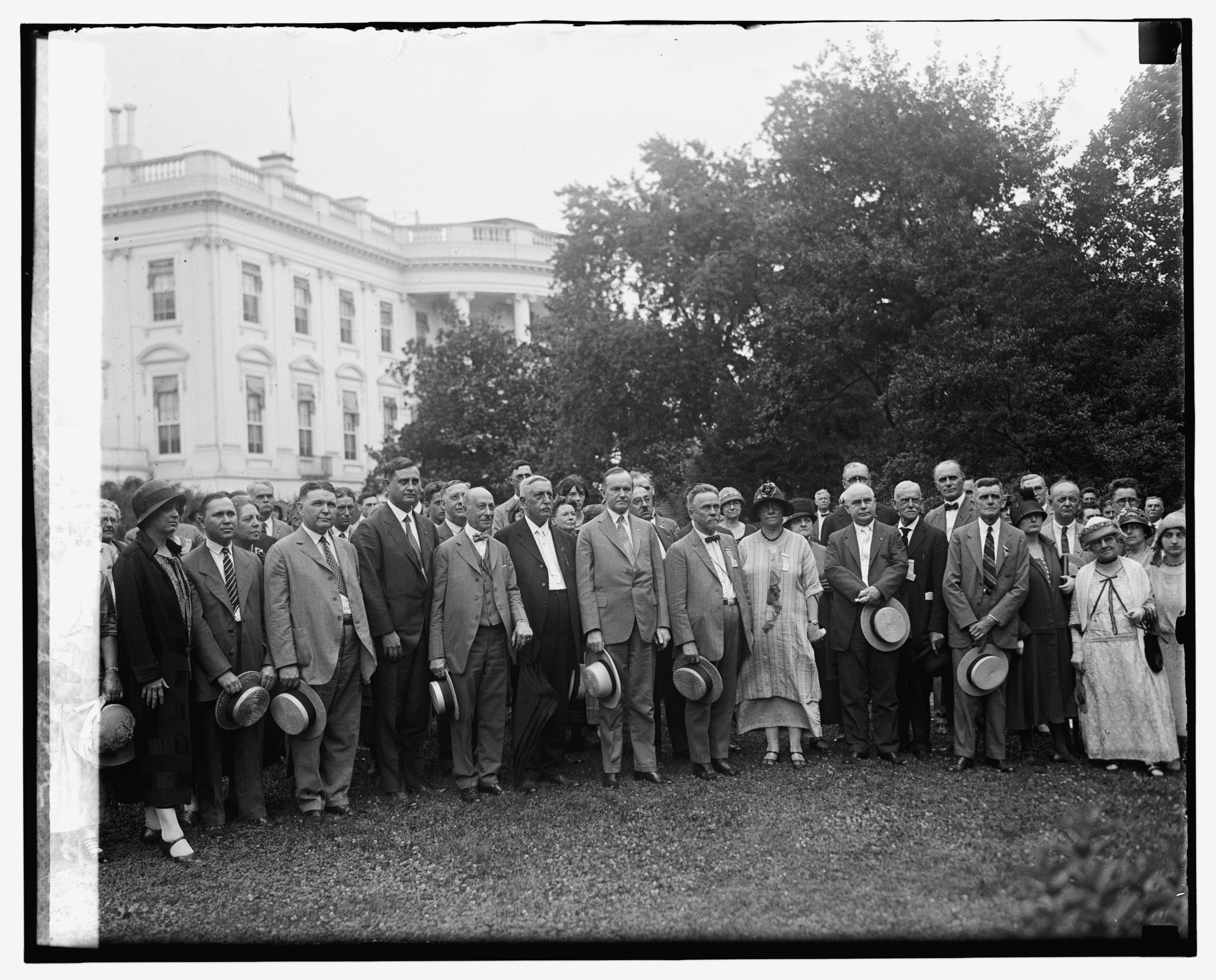
Glass negative of Calvin Coolidge and NEA delegates in Washington D.C. in 1925

In 1891, Edwin William Stephens became the sixth president of National Editorial Association after a discussion at the organization's seventh annual convention. The National Editorial Association changed its name to the National Newspaper Association after a Dallas, Texas, meeting in 1964.

== Conventions ==
The National Newspaper Association holds an annual news convention. At the conventions, newspaper editors meet and discuss various publishing related topics. An informal convention took place in New Orleans after the organization's founding. The organization's first formal convention took place on February 23, 1886, in Cincinnati, Ohio.
