= Walter Williams (painter) =

English painter (1834–1906)

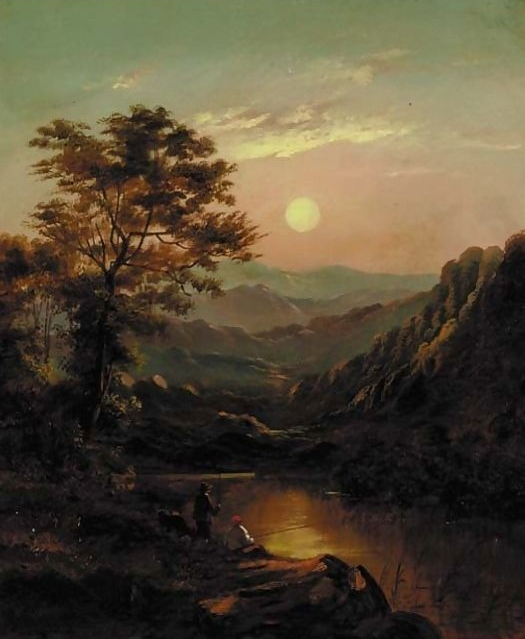
Anglers in a mountainous river landscape at sunset, by Williams

George Walter Williams (29 November 1834 – 14 April 1906) was an English landscape painter during the Victorian era, and a member of the Williams family of painters.

== Biography ==
Williams was born on 29 November 1834 in London, being the son of the well-known Victorian landscape painter George Augustus Williams and his wife Caroline Smith. Some sources attribute to him a twin brother named George. However, as his baptismal record proves, George and Walter are the same person. He became a painter like his father, and married another painter Jane Pearcy (1832–1872), with whom he had two children – Florence Ada Williams (1859–1927) and Cyril Stanley Williams (born 1863) – both of whom became painters as well, but neither of whom achieved any measurable degree of success as artists. Walter remarried two more times, after the deaths of each of his previous wives.

Williams is commonly confused with a contemporary, but different, landscape painter named Walter Heath Williams, to whom he is not related. The former generally signed his works Walter Williams or W. Williams, whereas the latter used Walter H. Williams or simply W. H. Williams, the similarity in their signatures adding to the confusion between the two artists. Walter Williams generally painted subjects similar to those by the rest of his family, with bodies of still water next to dense thickets of trees against backdrops of hills and clouds. His paintings tend to be dark in tone with a profusion of green. By contrast, Walter Heath Williams painted landscapes that are much lighter and brighter in tone, characterized by yellows and light browns, his favorite subjects being farm fields with corn stalks and piles of hay.

Williams lived at 8 Lonsdale Terrace in Surrey for most of his life, and he exhibited a total of 81 paintings at the Royal Academy (10 works), the British Institution (14 works) and the Society of British Artists (47 works). His first wife Jane Williams exhibited some of her works also. He continued to paint after Jane's death, but after the death of his third wife, who is said to have been close to thirty years his junior, he fell into decline and ruin. He finally left his home in poverty in 1902 to enter a work house, and soon lost contact with family and friends. He died on 14 April 1906, aged 71, in a poorhouse in Richmond, Surrey and was buried in a pauper's grave. It is said that his sister Caroline Fanny Williams lived just a short distance away, yet was unaware of her brother's passing.

Though incorrectly credited sometimes to Walter Heath Williams, an example of the work of Walter Williams, son of George Augustus Williams is The Pass at Llanberris in the Harris Museum & Art Gallery at Preston Lancashire. Examples probably exist in other British museums as well that are wrongly attributed to his namesake.
