= Jack Williams (footballer, born 1885) =

English footballer

Personal information
- Full name: Jack Williams
- Date of birth: December 1885
- Place of birth: Washington, Tyne and Wear, England
- Position: Centre forward

Senior career*
Years	Team	Apps	(Gls)
1903–1904	Hebburn Argyle		
1904–1906	Bury	15	(7)
1906–1909	Nelson		
1909–1910	Clapton Orient	12	(3)
1910	Leyton		
Total		27	(10)
- * Club domestic league appearances and goals

Jack Walter Williams (December 1885–unknown) was an English footballer who played in the Football League for Bury and Clapton Orient.
