= Walter Heath Williams =

English painter

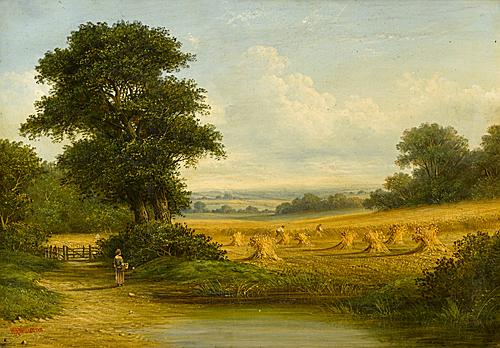
Walter Heath Williams Harvest Time

Walter Heath Williams (birthdate unknown, exhibited 1841 to 1876) was a Victorian landscape artist known for his paintings of fields of haystacks and corn stooks.

== Life ==
Little is known for certain about Walter Heath Williams due to widespread confusion of him with a contemporary artist also named Walter Williams (1834–1906), who was a member of the well-known Williams family of painters. Because both men were landscape artists, living in England at about the same time, and both signed their works similarly, it is difficult to distinguish one from the other. However, Walter Heath Williams lived in the southwest of England in Bath, Somerset, and in Topsham and Torquay in Devon, whereas his namesake lived nearly his entire life in Surrey, on the south side of London. The consequence of this mistaken identity is that neither the birth nor death dates of Walter Heath Williams are known for sure. However, we do know that he actively exhibited his paintings from 1841 to 1876, which would indicate that he was several years older than his namesake who in 1841 was only 7 years old.

== Work ==
Walter Heath Williams specialized in painting farm scenes with rows of haystacks, or stalks of corn tied into stooks, all brightly lit by the midday sun. He tended to use a palette dominated by yellows and soft browns, and he often used stippling to give the effect of flowers in fields, and leaves on trees. He also painted some river and coastal landscapes of Devon and Cornwall. By contrast, his contemporary from Surrey painted streams, marshes and lakes near his home in Surrey and in Wales, often near dense thickets of trees, and with hills in the background. This Walter Williams also tended to use a much darker palette of colors, dominated by greens, and many of his landscapes are weakly lit by the setting sun, or by shafts of sunlight casting shadows through clouds. Despite being the lesser-known of the two, Walter Heath Williams was a prolific painter nonetheless, more so than his namesake, exhibiting a total of 129 paintings at the Royal Academy (34 works), the British Institution (40 works), and the Society of British Artists (55 works), compared to 81 works by the other Walter Williams. Examples of his work also appear in various British museums, but sometimes paintings attributed to Walter Heath Williams are actually those of his namesake.
