= Jackie Williams (footballer, born 1929) =

English footballer

Personal information
- Full name: John William Williams
- Date of birth: 1 August 1929
- Place of birth: Garston, England
- Date of death: 1973 (aged 43–44)
- Place of death: Liverpool, England
- Position: Winger

Senior career*
| Years | Team | Apps | (Gls) |
| 1946–1947 | Tranmere Rovers | 1 | (0) |
- * Club domestic league appearances and goals

Jackie Williams (1 August 1929 – 1973) was an English footballer, who played as a winger in the Football League for Tranmere Rovers. He died in 1973.
