= Jack Williams (journalist) =

American journalist

- Born: June 12, 1936; Jacksonville, Florida
- Died: March 21, 2026 (aged 89)
- Occupations: Journalist; Author
- Spouse(s): Darlene Shields (m. c. 1986; died 2021)
- Writing career
- Subjects: Weather; Climate; Meteorology; Antarctica; Aviation; Auto Racing
- Notable works: USA Today Weather Book; AMS Weather Book
- Notable awards: American Meteorological Society Louis J. Battan Author’s Award; 1997 USA Today, The Weather Book – outstanding book on the atmospheric and related sciences

John "Jack" Clifford Williams (June 12, 1936 – March 21, 2026) was an American journalist, science writer, and author. He was the founding editor of the USA Today weather page and has written several popular books on weather and related subjects.

== Early life and education ==
Williams grew up in Jacksonville, Florida, where he became interested in weather at an early age. He recalled years later having heard grade school classmates talk about a hurricane offshore, thinking it might hit Jacksonville, while Williams knew it would make landfall near Miami.

After graduating from high school, Williams joined the Marines and served for several years before enlisting, at the age of 21, as a midshipman at the U.S. Naval Academy.

Following his military service, he attended Jacksonville University, where he received a bachelor's degree in history and government in 1962.

== Career ==
=== Early career ===
Williams began his career as a copy boy and reporter the Florida Times-Union, while attending college. In 1962, he began working as general assignment reporter for the Jacksonville Journal. In 1964, Williams moved to Rochester, New York, where he initially worked for the Rochester Times-Union. In addition to other beats, he served as an auto reporter for the Times-Union, where he wrote a weekly column in 1967 devoted to reporting “on personalities in the auto world,” providing “tips for drivers of all types,” and telling readers “what’s doing in the exciting world of racing.” He also served as an education reporter for the paper and, in 1968, began a new column on changes taking places at the state colleges at Brockport, Geneseo, and Buffalo.

From 1970 to 1976, Williams served as director of news operations for the State University of New York (SUNY) Brockport. In 1976, he began working at the Democrat & Chronicle, Gannett's local newspaper in Rochester.

At the Democrat & Chronicle, Williams began to shift his focus to writing about weather and meteorology. Although his main job was that of copy editor, he began writing stories about the weather and, by 1979, had begun writing a weekly column as part of the paper's Sunday weather page. It was during this time that he began taking meteorology courses at SUNY Brockport, including those offered by Ira Geer, who would later become the founding director of the American Meteorological Society (AMS) Education Program, which Geer oversaw from 1991 to 2008. As Williams recalled later, Geer was an important inspiration to him in his weather education and outreach efforts.

Williams also attributed his interest in weather to his decision, in 1977, to take flying lessons, which, he said, “had reawakened the weather interests I had as a child growing up in Florida in the 1940s and 1950s.”

=== USA Today ===
In early 1981, Williams was asked to join a small group of people from Gannett newspapers around the country to travel to Washington, D.C., to develop a new, national newspaper that would eventually be launched as USA Today. Williams worked with Jim Norman from the Pensacola News Journal and artist George Rorick to develop prototypes of the newspaper's weather page. When USA Today launched in September 1982, Williams was named editor of the weather page—a position he held for nearly 23 years, until his retirement in April 2005. In addition to editing the print version of USA Today’s weather page, Williams also served as weather editor of the newspaper’s website, which began in 1995.

During his time at USA Today, Williams wrote a number of feature articles on a variety of topics related to weather, climate, and related subjects. The following is a small sampling of articles with his byline:

- WWII plane: Frozen 'time capsule' (August 1, 1990)
- Since '91, Pinatubo has left its mark (October 20, 1992)
- Forecasters' task: Know which way the wind blows (September 16, 1996)
- Tracking falcons' flight (October 22, 1997)
- Braving a brutal winter to map climatic history (July 30, 1997)
- Tanking the Arctic's temperature (August 29, 2002)
- Ice clarifies climate's secrets (August 31, 2004)

In addition to articles on weather, climate, and related subjects, Williams did, on occasion, write stories on aviation and auto racing—a throwback to his early days in journalism—as the following two examples illustrate:

- Air show extra: Study of small-plane rules vowed (August 1, 1989)
- Corvette quite a ride compared to Nextel Cup Chevrolet Monte Carlo (May 28, 2004)

Still, it was weather that remained the subject most closely associated with Williams throughout his time at USA Today. A consistent feature of the paper’s content has been the colorful infographics. Many of the weather infographics during his tenure were based on research conducted by him.

Williams was known for his active participation in the work of the subjects on whom he reported—often working in the field alongside storm chasers, hurricane hunters, and other professionals in meteorology to help provide a more immersive storytelling experience for his readers. One notable example was Williams's reporting on Hurricane Fran in September 1996, which took him aboard a NOAA P-3 hurricane hunter airplane. “It was a dream assignment,” Williams wrote. “Our nine-hour flight would take us into Hurricane Fran's eye several times on Sept. 5, 1996. We'd see things few others ever see, have a thrill to last a lifetime.”

In 1999, Williams was one of six journalists chosen by the National Science Foundation to travel to Antarctica and report on research taking place there. He applied at the suggestion of Susan Soloman, who, in 1986 and 1987, led a National Ozone Expedition to Antarctica that provided critical evidence confirming the chemical processes—namely the role of CFCs—responsible for the Antarctic ozone hole.

As Williams later described it:

Then, out of the blue, l received an e-mail from a scientist I had worked with on stories, suggesting that I apply to the National Science Foundation to go to Antarctica as a journalist. This made me see that I wanted to go to Antarctica without realizing it. In my application, l had to describe the stories I wanted to do about Antarctica, and I needed to show I knew enough about polar science to ask informed questions. I became almost obsessed, reading everything I could find, not only about the science, but also about polar history and geography.

Williams's time in Antarctica yielded several stories for USA Today, including one on the ill-fated expedition of Captain Robert Falcon Scott. Williams also wrote a number of feature articles based on his time in Antarctica, including a cover story for the January/February 2000 issue of Weatherwise.

Williams retired as founding weather editor of USA Today in April 2005.

=== Post-USA Today ===
In April 2005, Williams joined the AMS as the organization's public outreach coordinator. In that capacity, he spent several years developing a new book about weather and climate aimed at general audiences. This was published in 2009 as The AMS Weather Book.

== Books ==
Williams has authored or coauthored the following books:

- The Weather Book: An Easy-to-Understand Guide to the USA’s Weather (1992; 1997; commonly known as "The USA Today Weather Book")
- The USA Today Weather Almanac (1994)
- Hurricane Watch: Forecasting the Deadliest Storms on Earth (2002; coauthored with Bob Sheets)
- The Complete Idiot's Guide to the Arctic and Antarctic (2003)
- National Geographic Field Guide to the Water's Edge (2012; coauthored with Stephen P. Leatherman)
- The AMS Weather Book: The Ultimate Guide to America's Weather (2013)
- National Geographic Pocket Guide to the Weather of North America (2017)

== Memberships, honors and awards ==
Williams was a member of several professional organizations related to weather, science, and journalism, including the AMS, of which he was elected a fellow in 2015. He has served as a member of the AMS Board of School and Popular Meteorological and Oceanographic Education. He was also a member of the American Geophysical Union, the American Association for the Advancement of Science, the National Association of Science Writers, and the D.C. Science Writers Association. In addition, he was a longtime member of the National Press Club and was a National Fellow of The Explorers Club.

Williams received the AMS Louis J. Battan Author's Award in 1997 “for his USA Today, The Weather Book, a scientifically authentic, easy-to-understand, text with novel visuals.”

== Personal life ==
Williams was married for nearly 35 years to Darlene Shields—also a member of the National Press Club—who died in 2021.
