= Walter Williams (journalist) =

American journalist and educator (1864–1925)

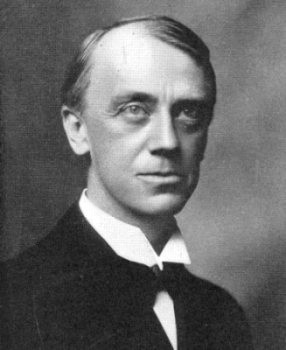
- Born: July 2, 1864; Boonville, Missouri, US
- Died: July 29, 1935 (aged 71); Columbia, Missouri, US
- Resting place: Columbia Cemetery, Columbia, Missouri, US
- Occupations: Journalist and educator
- Spouse(s): Hulda Harned (m. 1892); Sara Lockwood Williams (m. 1927)

Walter Williams (July 2, 1864 – July 29, 1935) was an American journalist and educator. He founded the world's first journalism school at the University of Missouri, and later served as the university's president. An internationalist, he promoted the ideals of journalism globally and is often referred to as "The Father of Journalism Education".

== Biography ==
Williams was born in Boonville, Missouri in 1864. Both his parents died when he was just 14 years old, forcing Williams to quit school to help support his siblings. Though he quit attending school he later graduated from Boonville High School in 1879. Williams got a job as an apprentice at the Boonville Topic making 75 cents a week. In 1884 the Topic merged with the Boonville Advertiser, and despite being just 20 years old Williams was hired as editor. Two years later he became a part-owner in the newspaper, and was also elected President of the Missouri Press Association. In 1888 he worked doing press releases for the Missouri State Penitentiary. After the warden began censoring his releases he resigned and began editing the Columbia Herald in 1889 and began making contributions to Jefferson City, Kansas City and St. Louis newspapers. He married Hulda Harned in 1892. In 1895 he was named president of the National Editorial Association. Working with his employer Edwin William Stephens through the Missouri Press Association, Williams helped to found the State Historical Society of Missouri in 1898.

In the late 1890s Walter Williams began lobbying the Missouri General Assembly and the Board of Curators of the University of Missouri to establish a school of journalism. Many newspaper editors and owners objected saying that reporters should follow the traditional apprentice route for training. However the General Assembly and the Curators eventually approved the addition of the College of Journalism in 1905 with Williams as dean. After some delay, the School of Journalism was finally established in 1908 with ninety-seven students served by three faculty members.

In 1902, Williams traveled to 27 nations on four continents to publicize the 1904 St. Louis World's Fair to the international press. As dean of the School of Journalism he continued to travel the globe, serving as a relentless publicist for both the school and the profession of journalism. In 1915, he was elected president of the Press Congress of the World; and led its first formal sessions in Honolulu, Hawaii in 1921. That same year, he lectured in Beijing and Shanghai, and established a department of journalism at China's Yenching University in 1928. One of his earliest actions as Dean was creating the University Missourian (now the Columbia Missourian) newspaper so that his students would gain practical hands-on experience running a newspaper while also receiving their education.

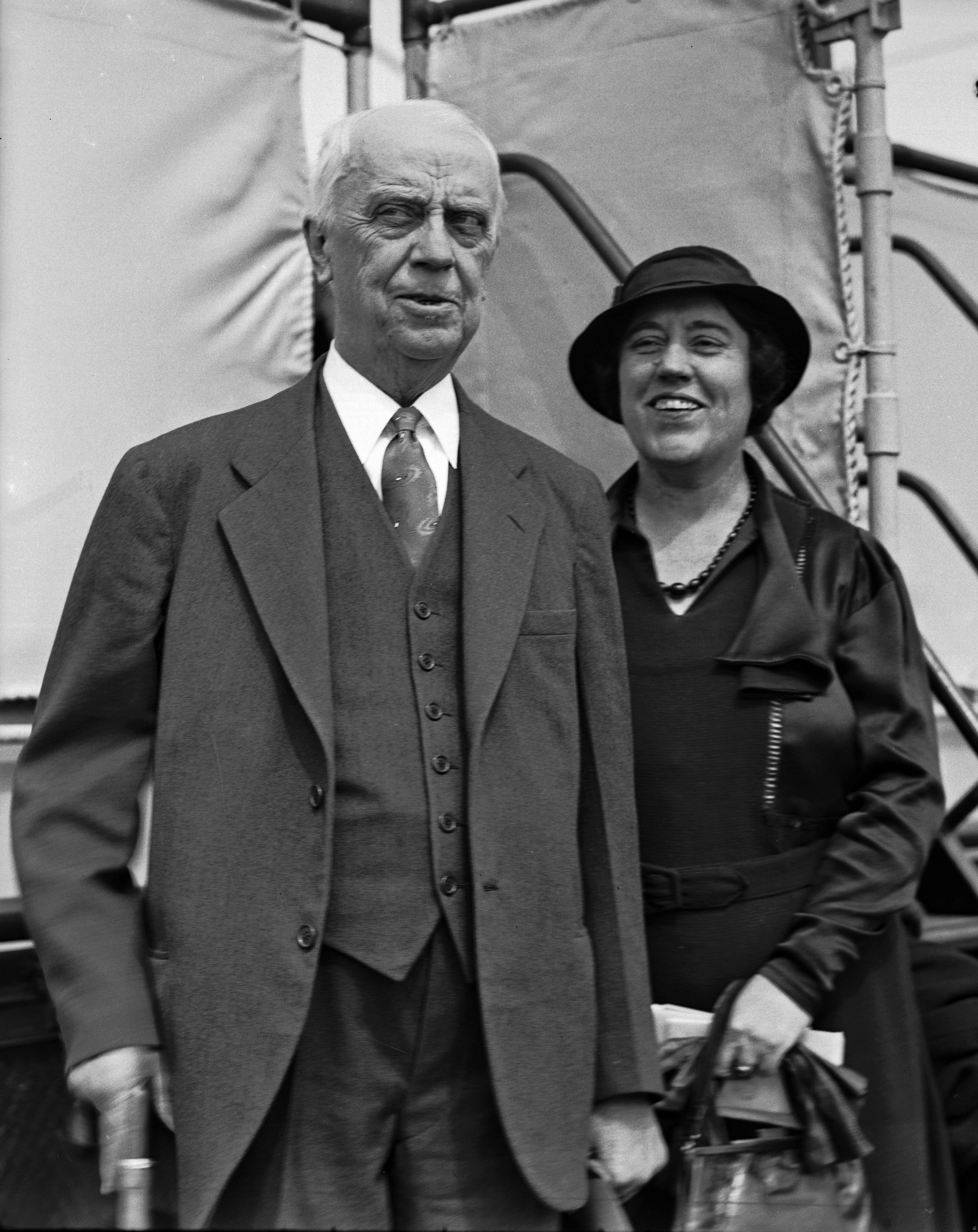
Williams and his wife Sarah, 1935

It wasn't long before other colleges and universities across the United States began to emulate the University of Missouri program. However Williams became increasingly concerned they would not adhere to the same high journalistic standards and professionalism being taught at "Mizzou". So, in 1914 he created the Journalist's Creed, a statement of professional guidelines often evoked as the definitive code of ethics for journalists. It is posted in bronze at the National Press Club in Washington, DC.

In 1930, he established the Missouri Honor Medal for Distinguished Service in Journalism. Also in 1930 he wrote Missouri, Mother of the West with Floyd Calvin Shoemaker. He served as a member of the Pulitzer Prize Board for 1931–32. A member of the University of Missouri Board of Curators, Williams became president of the university in 1931. He took over the leadership when Mizzou, like many other American institutions of higher learning, was struggling with funding issues due to the Great Depression. So that his faculty might receive much needed raises, Williams cut his own salary. His health began to fail as his presidency wore on, and he died while still holding the position in July, 1935, of pneumonia after a diagnosis of prostate cancer. He was buried in Columbia Cemetery.

== Honors ==
Walter Williams never attended college, although honorary degrees were conferred upon him by Missouri Valley College in 1900; Kansas State University in 1909 and Washington University in St. Louis in 1926. Before his death, he was initiated as an honorary brother of the Acacia fraternity.

== Legacy ==
A new journalism building on the Columbia, Missouri campus was named for him in 1936. A World War II Liberty ship, SS Walter Williams (hull MC No. 2291), launched in 1943 was named in his honor.

Williams has a group of scholars named after him at the University of Missouri, who are journalism students directly admitted to the journalism program who have received a 33 or above on their ACT (or 1450 on the SAT) in high school.

The Walter Williams Club is the name of the alumni association of University of Missouri Journalism School graduates.

== Notes ==
Academic offices
Preceded by Stratton Brooks	President of the University of Missouri; 1931-1935	Succeeded by Frederick Middlebush
