= Jack D. Williams =

American politician

Jack D. Williams is an American politician from Alabama who served as a member of the Alabama House of Representatives, representing district 47 from 2004 to 2018. During his tenure, Williams chaired the Commerce and Small Business Committee.

On April 2, 2018, Williams was arrested on federal bribery charges along with former Alabama Republican Party Chairman Marty Connors and Trina Healthcare owner G. Ford Gilbert. The charges stemmed from an alleged effort by Connors and Gilbert, to push a bill through the Alabama Legislature that would have required Blue Cross and Blue Shield insurance to cover diabetes treatments.

All charges against Williams were dismissed in a government agreement on February 11, 2020.
