= Journalist's Creed =

The Journalist's Creed is a personal and professional affirmation and code of journalism ethics written by Walter Williams in 1914. The creed has been published in more than 100 languages, and a bronze plaque of The Journalist's Creed hangs at the National Press Club in Washington, D.C. Williams was the founding dean of the Missouri School of Journalism.

== The Journalist's Creed ==
- I believe in the profession of journalism.
- I believe that the public journal is a public trust; that all connected with it are, to the full measure of their responsibility, trustees for the public; that acceptance of a lesser service than the public service is betrayal of this trust.
- I believe that clear thinking and clear statement, accuracy and fairness are fundamental to good journalism.
- I believe that a journalist should write only what he holds in his heart to be true.
- I believe that suppression of the news, for any consideration other than the welfare of society, is indefensible.
- I believe that no one should write as a journalist what he would not say as a gentleman; that bribery by one’s own pocketbook is as much to be avoided as bribery by the pocketbook of another; that individual responsibility may not be escaped by pleading another’s instructions or another’s dividends.
- I believe that advertising, news and editorial columns should alike serve the best interests of readers; that a single standard of helpful truth and cleanness should prevail for all; that the supreme test of good journalism is the measure of its public service.
- I believe that the journalism which succeeds best — and best deserves success — fears God and honors Man; is stoutly independent, unmoved by pride of opinion or greed of power, constructive, tolerant but never careless, self-controlled, patient, always respectful of its readers but always unafraid, is quickly indignant at injustice; is unswayed by the appeal of privilege or the clamor of the mob; seeks to give every man a chance and, as far as law and honest wage and recognition of human brotherhood can make it so, an equal chance; is profoundly patriotic while sincerely promoting international good will and cementing world-comradeship; is a journalism of humanity, of and for today’s world.
