= Jack Williams (footballer, born 1906) =

English footballer

Personal information
- Full name: Walter John Williams
- Date of birth: 18 July 1906
- Place of birth: Wolverhampton, England
- Date of death: 26 July 1982 (aged 76)
- Place of death: Brighton, England
- Height: 6 ft 0 in (1.83 m)
- Position: Centre half

Senior career*
| Years | Team | Apps | (Gls) |
| 19??–1925 | Wednesfield Rovers | | |
| 1925–1928 | Wolverhampton Wanderers | 3 | (0) |
| 1928 | Gillingham | 9 | (0) |
| 1928–1931 | Brighton & Hove Albion | 42 | (1) |
- * Club domestic league appearances and goals

Walter John Williams (18 July 1906 – 26 July 1982) was an English professional footballer who played as a centre half in the Football League for Wolverhampton Wanderers, Gillingham and Brighton & Hove Albion.

== Life and career ==
Williams was born in 1906 in Wolverhampton, and played local football for Wednesfield Rovers before signing for Second Division club Wolverhampton Wanderers in November 1925, initially as an amateur. He made only three league appearances, in the 1927–28 season, and moved on to Gillingham of the Third Division South. After three months and nine appearances, he moved on again, to another Southern Section club, Brighton & Hove Albion, where he was very highly rated. He was a regular in the side, and played 48 appearances in all competitions before a serious injury sustained towards the end of the 1929–30 season ended his career at the age of 23. He left the club in 1931 and joined the Brighton police. Williams died in Brighton in 1982.
