= Isabella High School =

Location
- 11338 County Road 15; Maplesville, Alabama 36750; United States
- Coordinates: 32°49′44″N 86°47′5″W

Information
- School type: Public
- Motto: "Growing Tomorrows Leaders Today"
- School district: Chilton County School District
- CEEB code: 011700
- Principal: Ricky Porter
- Faculty: 33.88 (FTE)
- Grades: Pre-K-12
- Enrollment: 714 (2017–18)
- Student to teacher ratio: 21.07
- Colors: Black, gold, and white
- Mascot: Mustangs
- Rival: Maplesville High School, Thorsby High School
- Website: ihs.chiltonboe.com

Isabella High School is a K-12 public school in the unincorporated community of Isabella, located in Maplesville, Chilton County, Alabama.

== History ==
Education in the community of Isabella centered primarily around the Isabella Methodist Church for much of its early history. By 1927 however, the school had since grown beyond the church and had become a distinct senior high school. The school had included a vocational building for agricultural studies since 1923, the first agricultural department to be established within the county.

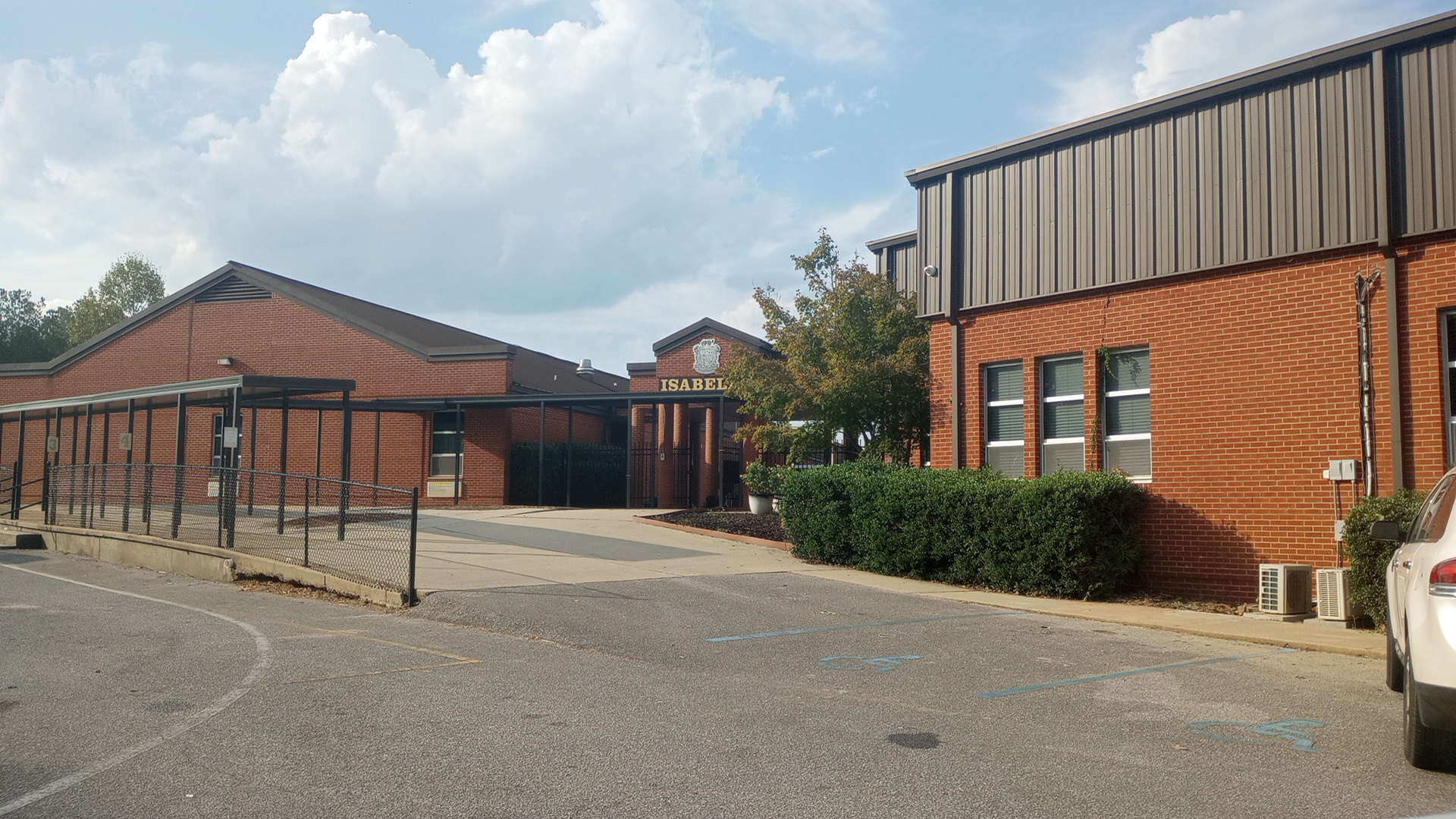
Front entrance to the school.

In 1988, the school suffered a major fire which destroyed most of the original building. By October 1989 a new set of buildings had been erected which the school currently occupies.
