= Chilton County High School =

Public school in Clanton, Alabama, United States

Coordinates: 32.821°N 86.612°W

- Clanton, Alabama 35045; United States

Information
- Type: Public Secondary
- Established: 1962 (64 years ago)
- Status: Open
- School district: Chilton County School District
- Category: High School
- CEEB code: 010675
- Principal: Louise Pitts
- Teaching staff: 39.20 (FTE)
- Grades: 9–12
- Enrollment: 834 (2023–2024)
- Student to teacher ratio: 21.28
- Campus: 1
- Student Union/Association: SGA
- Colors: Orange and Royal Blue
- Mascot: Chilco the Tiger
- Nickname: CCHS
- Rival: Jemison High School
- Yearbook: The Silver Shield
- Website: cchs.chiltonboe.com

Chilton County High School (CCHS) is a secondary school/ public high school in Clanton, Alabama, serving approximately 800 students in grades 9–12. in Clanton, Alabama, which educates grades 9–12.

As of 2024, the school principal is Louise Pitts. The school mascot is the Tiger.

== Notable alumni ==
- George T. Alexander, 2,000th American soldier killed during the 2003 invasion of Iraq
- Jackson W. Moore, former CEO of Union Planters Corporation and Regions Financial Corporation
- Jarrod Patterson, former MLB player (Detroit Tigers, Kansas City Royals)
- Clay Carroll, former MLB pitcher
- Drew Roy, actor
- Grayson Russell, actor
