= Amariah (given name) =

Amariah / Amarias is a Hebrew male name meaning "God has said" or "Promised by God". Variations can include Amarissa, Amaris, or Amarit. Amariah is different from Amaria, a Greek female name meaning "Moon, Alluring, Pure, Illuminating."

Amariah may refer to:

- Amariah, biblical characters
- A man named Amariah appears on the Kuntillet Ajrud inscriptions.
- Amariah Brigham (1798–1849), American psychiatrist
- Amariah Farrow (born 1980), Canadian football player
