= Senator Bean =

Senator Bean may refer to:

- Aaron Bean (born 1967), Florida State Senate
- Benning M. Bean (1782–1866), New Hampshire State Senate
- James Bean (1933–2013), Mississippi State Senate
- Jason Bean (politician) (fl. 2020s), Missouri State Senate
- Jim Bean (1932–2013), Mississippi State Senate
- Ralph J. Bean (1912–1978), West Virginia State Senate
- Ronald Clarence Bean (1936–2005), Louisiana State Senate
- Samuel C. Bean (1819–1870), Wisconsin State Senate
