= Alabama State Route 191 =

State highway in Alabama, United States

State Route 191

Route information
- Maintained by ALDOT
- Length: 13.942 mi (22.437 km)

Major junctions
- South end: SR 22 west of Maplesville
- North end: US 31 in Jemison

Location
- Country: United States
- State: Alabama
- Counties: Chilton

Highway system
- Alabama State Highway System; Interstate; US; State
← SR 189	→ SR 192

State Route 191 (SR 191) is a 13.942-mile (22.437 km) state highway that serves as a connection between Maplesville and Jemison in western Chilton County. SR 191 intersects SR 22 at its southern terminus and US 31 at its northern terminus.

== Route description ==
SR 191 begins at its intersection with SR 22 just east of Maplesville. The route progresses in a northerly direction through its intersection with County Road 36 (CR 36) where it turns in a northeasterly direction en route to its northern terminus at US 31 in Jemison.

== Major intersections ==
The entire route is in Chilton County.

Location	mi	km	Destinations	Notes
	0.0	0.0	SR 22 – Maplesville, Clanton	Southern terminus
Jemison	13.942	22.437	US 31 (SR 3) – Calera, Thorsby	Northern terminus
1.000 mi = 1.609 km; 1.000 km = 0.621 mi
