= Chilton County Airport =

Airport in Clanton, Alabama, U.S.

Chilton County Airport Gragg-Wade Field
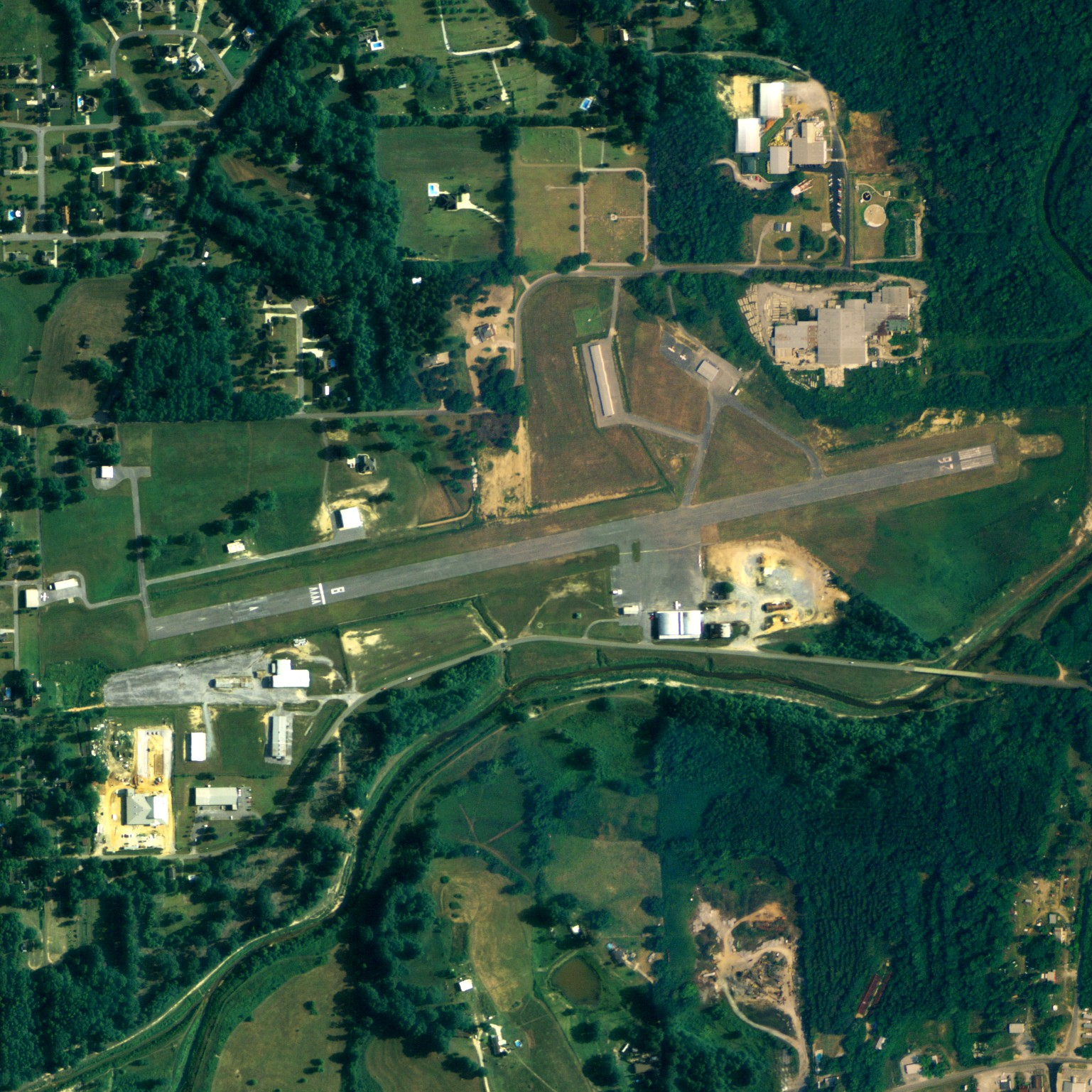
- NAIP aerial image, June 2006
- IATA: none; ICAO: none; FAA LID: 02A

Summary
- Airport type: Public
- Owner: Chilton County Airport Authority
- Serves: Chilton County, Alabama
- Location: Clanton, Alabama
- Elevation AMSL: 585 ft (178 m)
- Coordinates: 32°51′2″N 86°36′41″W

Map
- Location of airport in Alabama 02A (the United States)

Runways
Direction	Length		Surface
Direction	ft	m	Surface
8/26	4,007	1,221	Asphalt

Statistics (2017)
- Aircraft operations (2016): 23,924
- Based aircraft: 23
- Source: Federal Aviation Administration
- Gragg Field Historic District
- U.S. National Register of Historic Places
- U.S. Historic district
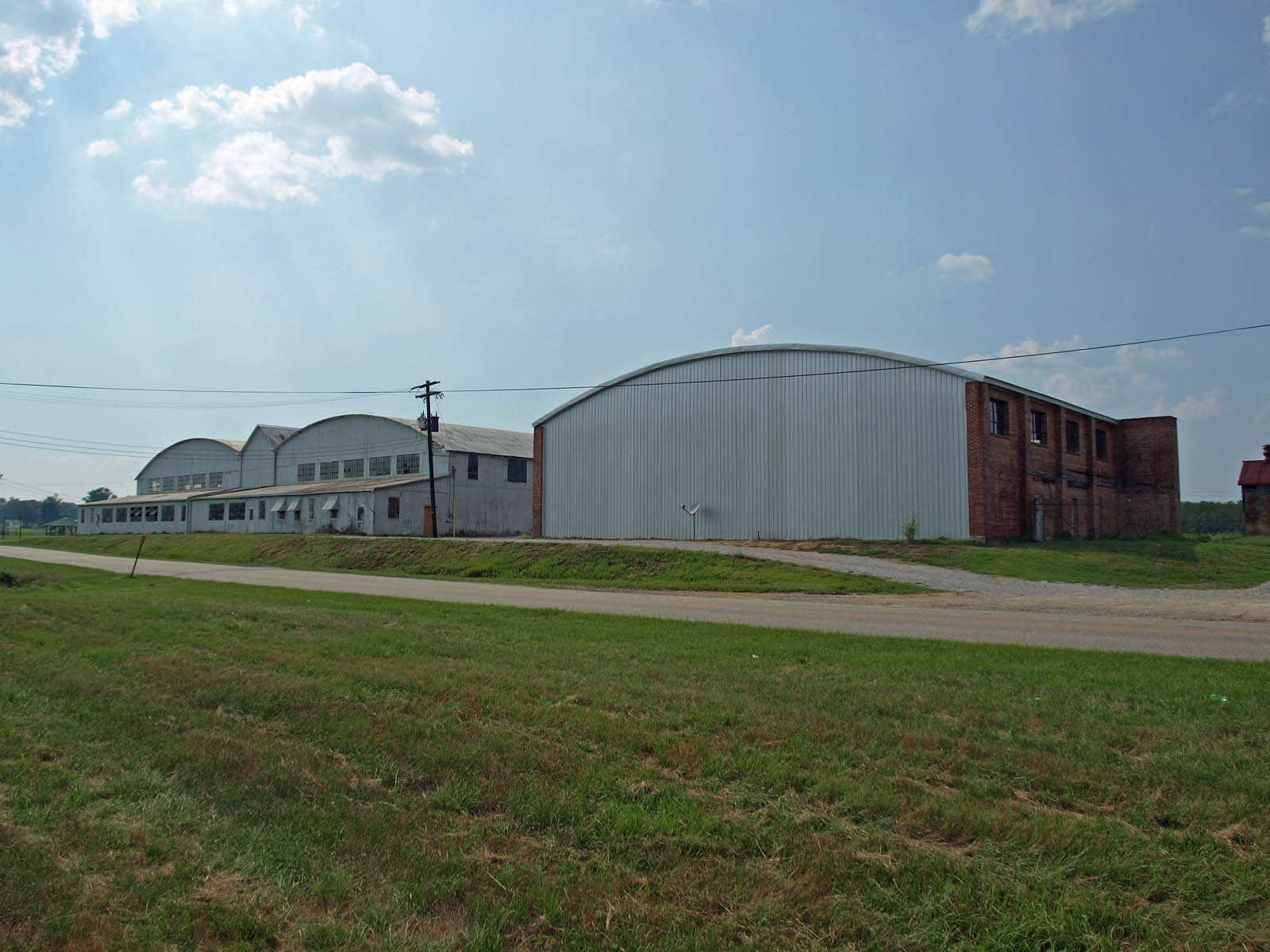
- Historic hangars at Gragg Field
- Area: 2.1 acres (0.85 ha)
- Built: 1934
- NRHP reference No.: 04000557
- Added to NRHP: June 2, 2004

Chilton County Airport (FAA LID: 02A), also known as Gragg-Wade Field, is a public-use airport in Chilton County, Alabama, United States. It is located one nautical mile (2 km) east of the central business district of Clanton, Alabama. It is owned by the Chilton County Airport Authority.

This airport is included in the FAA's National Plan of Integrated Airport Systems for 2011–2015 and 2009–2013, both of which categorized it as a general aviation facility.

== Facilities and aircraft ==
Chilton County Airport covers an area of 101 acres (41 ha) at an elevation of 585 feet (178 m) above mean sea level. It has one runway designated 8/26 with an asphalt surface measuring 4,008 by 100 feet (1,222 x 30 m).

For the 12-month period ending November 5, 2010, the airport had 23,924 general aviation aircraft operations, an average of 65 per day.

== See also ==
- List of airports in Alabama
