= Wesley Dennis =

Wesley Dennis may refer to:

- Wesley Dennis (illustrator) (1903–1966), American illustrator
- Wesley Dennis (baseball) (1918–2001), American Negro league first baseman
- Wesley Dennis (singer) (born 1963), American country music artist, or his self-titled debut album
