= George T. Alexander =

United States Army soldier

SSGT George Alexander United States Army
- Born: August 5, 1971; Alexandria, Virginia
- Died: October 22, 2005 (aged 34); San Antonio, Texas
- Burial place: Agee Memorial Garden, Clanton, Alabama
- Military career
- Allegiance: United States of America
- Branch: United States Army
- Service years: 1991–2005
- Rank: Staff Sergeant
- Unit: 3rd Infantry Division
- Conflicts: War in Iraq
- Awards: Purple Heart

Staff Sergeant George T. Alexander Jr. (August 5, 1971 – October 22, 2005) was the 2,000th American soldier killed in combat in Iraq since the beginning of the 2003 Invasion of Iraq, according to the Associated Press. He was serving as a crewman on a M2 Bradley combat vehicle when he was mortally wounded.

Alexander, an African-American, died October 22, 2005, at the Brooke Army Medical Center in San Antonio, Texas after being treated for injuries sustained five days earlier, when an improvised explosive device detonated near his M2 Bradley in the city of Samarra.

A 1989 graduate of Chilton County High School, Alexander spent two years working as a construction labourer before joining the military as Desert Storm began. At the time of his death, he was serving his third tour of duty in Iraq, assigned to the 1st Battalion, 15th Infantry Regiment, 3rd Brigade, 3rd Infantry Division, of Fort Benning, Georgia.

== Media Attention ==
The United States media noted this death above many others, as it was the 2,000th since the start of active combat, a number generally recognized as significant. Articles ran on such sites as CNN.com featuring the soldier. In contrast, the Pentagon downplayed the death — Lt. Col. Steven Boylan, a spokesman for the U.S. military in Iraq, told the Associated Press that "the 2,000 service members killed in Iraq supporting Operation Iraqi Freedom is not a milestone, it is an artificial mark on the wall set by individuals or groups with specific agendas and ulterior motives."

Alexander's death sparked Senators and Congressmen to debate the merits of the war again, something that had not been done in months, with Senators such as Dick Durbin making statements on the war. Peace activists cast the 2,000th combat death as a milestone in what they believe to be an unnecessary and unwinnable war. Immediately following the report of his death, six hundred anti-war protests and candlelight vigils were held in the United States on October 26, 2005.

== See also ==
- 2003 invasion of Iraq media coverage
