= Isabella, Alabama =

- Unincorporated community
- Location within the state of Alabama Isabella, Alabama (the United States)
- Coordinates: 32°49′42″N 86°47′12″W
- Country: United States
- State: Alabama
- County: Chilton
- Elevation: 456 ft (139 m)
- Time zone: UTC-6 (Central (CST))
  - Summer (DST): UTC-5 (CDT)
- Area codes: 205, 659

Isabella, also known as Benson or Bensen, is an unincorporated community in Chilton County, Alabama, United States. Isabella is home to Isabella High School. The community is centered on the school, as Isabella was never a center of trade or professional services.
