= Jumbo, Alabama =

- Unincorporated community
- Location within the state of Alabama Jumbo, Alabama (the United States)
- Coordinates: 32°58′02″N 86°35′26″W
- Country: United States
- State: Alabama
- County: Chilton
- Elevation: 404 ft (123 m)
- Time zone: UTC-6 (Central (CST))
  - Summer (DST): UTC-5 (CDT)
- Area codes: 205, 659

Jumbo is an unincorporated community in Chilton County, Alabama, United States.

== History ==
A post office called Jumbo was established in 1882, and remained in operation until it was discontinued in 1904.

A variety of dolomite, called the Jumbo Dolomite, is named for the community due to its presence in exposures and quarries near Jumbo.
