= Randall Atcheson =

- Born: Randall Atcheson; October 15, 1951 (age 74); Selma, Alabama
- Origin: Maplesville, Alabama
- Genres: Classical, gospel, popular, patriotic
- Occupation: Musician
- Instruments: Piano, organ
- Years active: 1975–present
- Labels: Windham Hill Records, Word Records, Vox Records, Polygram, RCA Records

Randall Atcheson is an American concert pianist.

== Life and career ==
Randall Atcheson, the son of a Southern Baptist minister, was raised in Maplesville, Alabama and Clanton, Alabama. He began studying piano at the age of six and added the organ at the age of nine. By the time he was 12 years old, he was enrolled in the Samford University School of Music in Birmingham, Alabama. In 1971, Atcheson transferred to New York City's Juilliard School where he went on to become the first student allowed to pursue and receive simultaneous degrees in piano and organ performance. He made his New York public performance debut at the Juilliard's Alice Tully Hall playing both instruments.

In the course of his career, Atcheson has performed at major venues internationally, including the Notre Dame Cathedral, Salle Gaveau and the American Embassy in Paris, France, Blenheim Palace in England, as well as 10 performances at Carnegie Hall.

Atcheson was named a Steinway Artist in 1991.

== Discography ==
Release date	Title	Label
July 1, 1991	Ivory Christmas	Polygram Records
October 23, 1997	Christmas by Candlelight	RCA Records
January 9, 2001	Great Piano Romance	Windham Hill Records
May 23, 2001	Piano Healing: Romance Film Collection	Windham Hill Records
