= Pletcher, Alabama =

- Unincorporated community
- Location within the state of Alabama Pletcher, Alabama (the United States)
- Coordinates: 32°42′10″N 86°47′06″W
- Country: United States
- State: Alabama
- County: Chilton
- Elevation: 443 ft (135 m)
- Time zone: UTC-6 (Central (CST))
  - Summer (DST): UTC-5 (CDT)
- Area codes: 205, 659
- GNIS feature ID: 125065

Pletcher, also known as Brookson, is an unincorporated community in Chilton County, Alabama, United States.

== History ==
The community was originally known as Brookson in honor of A. M. Brookson, who helped with the construction of the Mobile and Ohio Railroad. The name was then changed to Pletcher in honor of a Mr. E. Pletcher, who operated a local sawmill.

A post office operated under the name Pletcher from 1898 to 1956.
