= Chilton County School District =

School district in Alabama, United States

Address
- 1705 Lay Dam Rd Clanton, Alabama, 35045; United States
- Coordinates: 32.868700°N 86.622451°W

District information
- Grades: PK–12
- Superintendent: Corey Clements
- Schools: 14
- NCES District ID: 0100660

Students and staff
- Students: 7,831 (2019–20)
- Teachers: 424.35 (FTE)
- Student–teacher ratio: 18.45

Other information
- Website: chiltonboe.com

Chilton County School District is a school district in Chilton County, Alabama, United States.

The District includes:

- Clanton Elementary School
- Jemison Elementary School
- Clanton Intermediate School
- Jemison Intermediate School
- Clanton Middle School
- Jemison Middle School
- Chilton County High School
- Isabella High School
- Jemison High School
- Maplesville High School
- Thorsby High School
- Verbena High School
- LeCroy Career Technical Center
