= Walker–Klinner Farm =

Historic house in Alabama, United States

- U.S. National Register of Historic Places
- U.S. Historic district
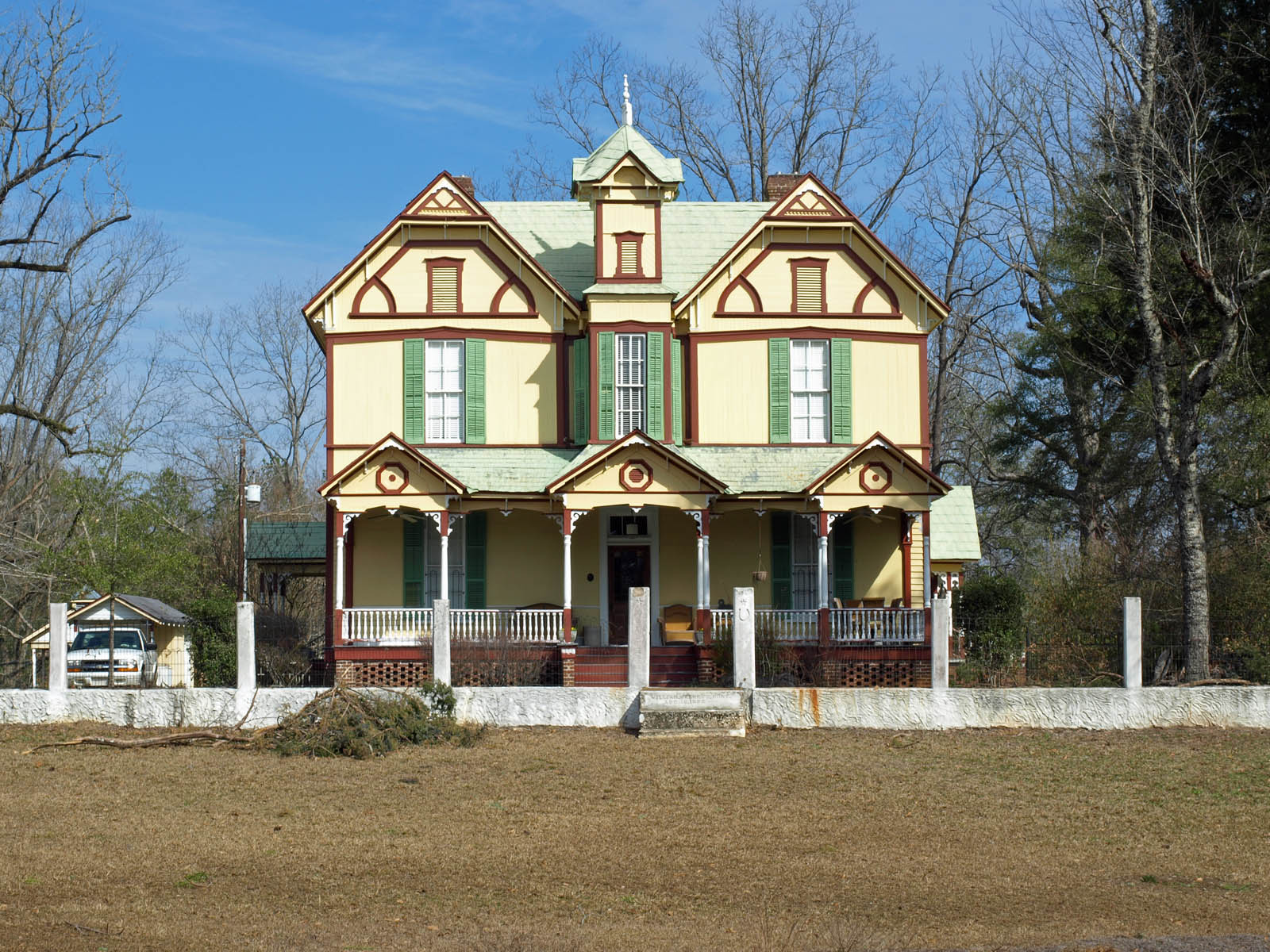
- The farmhouse, built in 1890

- Location within Alabama Location within the United States
- Location: 3.5 mi. E of Maplesville on AL 22, Maplesville, Alabama
- Coordinates: 32°48′9″N 86°48′25″W
- Area: 1,600 acres (650 ha)
- Architectural style: Eastlake
- NRHP reference No.: 87001849
- Added to NRHP: October 15, 1987

The Walker–Klinner Farm is a historic 1,600-acre (650 ha) farm and historic district near Maplesville, Alabama. The present boundaries of the farm were established during the mid-1850s. The two-and-a-half-story Eastlake-style farmhouse was built in 1890. Other contributing structures include the front yard fence (1927), tool shed (1900), chicken house (1900), corn crib (1890), overseer's house (1930), four tenant houses (ranging from 1850 to 1910), shed (1900), three barns (ranging from 1870 to 1900), water pump (1900), chicken coop (1900), cemetery (19th century), store (late 19th century), and a dogtrot house (19th century). There are also 15 noncontributing structures on the property. The farm is significant for its intact mid-19th century farm boundaries and for being maintained as a farm for more than 135 years at the time of nomination to the National Register. It was added to the National Register of Historic Places on October 15, 1987.
