= Jackson W. Moore =

American lawyer

- Born: November 2, 1948 (age 77); Birmingham, Alabama, U.S.
- Education: University of Alabama; Vanderbilt University Law School
- Occupations: Attorney, banking executive
- Known for: Former executive chairman of Union Planters Bank and Regions Financial Corporation
- Relatives: Kemmons Wilson (father-in-law)

Jackson W. Moore is an American attorney and a former executive chairman of Union Planters Bank and Regions Financial Corporation.

== Early life ==
Jackson W. Moore was born in Birmingham, Alabama on November 2, 1948. He grew up in Clanton, Alabama and graduated from Chilton County High School in 1966. In the fall of 1966, at the age of seventeen, Moore enrolled at the University of Alabama, where he received his bachelor's degree in banking and finance in 1970. He graduated from Vanderbilt University Law School in 1973.

== Career ==
Following a clerkship with Sullivan and Cromwell in New York City working on mergers and acquisitions, he entered the private practice of law in 1973 in Memphis, Tennessee following a brief stint the United States Army as a captain in the Adjudant Generals Corp. He remained with the firm until 1989, when he resigned to join Union Planters Bank as president and Chief Operating Officer. Moore had served as a member of the board of directors since 1987.

Moore succeeded Benjamin Rawlins as the CEO of Union Planters Bank after Rawlins died of a heart attack in September, 2000. As Chairman and CEO, Moore took the helm of the largest bank in Tennessee. During a period of falling interest rates, Moore closed over two hundred of the bank's under-performing branches, eliminated unnecessary salaries and expenditures, and streamlined operations.

=== Regions & AmSouth ===
In January, 2004, Regions Financial Corporation and Union Planters announced plans for a merger of equals that created the twelfth largest bank holding company in the US, and one of the largest banks in the Southeast. The $5.9 billion transaction created an expanded Regions Bank with five million customers and over fifty-six billion dollars in deposits. After 130 years, the Union Planters’ name was retired, though Regions retained Union Planters' longstanding logo of a young cotton plant as its logo for two more years. The merger created a 1,400-branch superbank with operations across fifteen states, and it was the largest bank in Louisiana, Alabama, Arkansas, Georgia, Mississippi and Tennessee. Moore was named chairman and chief executive of the merged bank and relocated with his family to its new headquarters in Birmingham, Alabama. In October, 2006, Moore oversaw Regions' merger with AmSouth Bancorporation. Upon approval by the Federal Reserve and completion of the merger, the expanded Regions became one of the ten largest bank holding companies in the US, with over $140 billion in assets, two thousand branches located in sixteen states, and thirty-seven thousand employees. Moore was named Executive Chairman of the merged bank, but AmSouth's C. Dowd Ritter became CEO.

=== Executive Compensation & Retirement ===
Moore announced his retirement from Regions effective December 31, 2007. At fifty-eight years old, Moore stated he was entering the "next phase" of his life. Moore, with wife Betty, moved back to Memphis, where he planned to focus on his private equity investments, civic and charitable work and spending time with his family. Moore continues to serve on the board of trustees for Vanderbilt University and Chairs the President's Cabinet at The University of Alabama. He continues his support of the Boy Scouts of America, himself a recipient of the Eagle Scout Award and the Distinguished Eagle Scout Award.

The Birmingham Business Journal reported in March, 2007 that Moore was paid Regions Bank over twenty-nine million dollars in 2006. The compensation package Moore received included a base salary of $951,391 and stock awards of over two million dollars, and bonuses of $2.5 million. He was also paid a retirement package of $9.4 million, accrued while CEO of Union Planters Bank. Added perks included a company car, personal use of the company jet, membership dues paid by the company of nineteen thousand dollars and payment of nearly $2 million in life insurance premiums.

== Personal life ==
Moore met Betty Wilson, the daughter of Holiday Inn founder Kemmons Wilson, in college. They were married in 1971.
