= Jarrod Patterson =

American baseball player (1973–2020)

- Third baseman
- Born: September 7, 1973; Montgomery, Alabama, U.S.
- Died: March 11, 2020 (aged 46); Clanton, Alabama, U.S.
- Batted: Left Threw: Right

MLB debut
- June 16, 2001, for the Detroit Tigers

Last MLB appearance
- September 28, 2003, for the Kansas City Royals

MLB statistics
- Batting average: .238
- Home runs: 2
- Runs batted in: 4
- Stats at Baseball Reference

Teams
- Detroit Tigers (2001); Kansas City Royals (2003)

Jarrod Zane Patterson (September 7, 1973 – March 11, 2020) was an American professional baseball third baseman. He was a graduate of Chilton County High School in Clanton, Alabama. He played during two seasons for Major League Baseball (MLB) for the Detroit Tigers and Kansas City Royals. He was drafted by the New York Mets in the 20th round of the 1993 MLB draft. Patterson played his first professional season with their Rookie League Gulf Coast Mets in 1993, and his last with the independent Northern League's Joliet Jackhammers, Schaumburg Flyers, Gary SouthShore RailCats in 2006. He played his last affiliated season for the Royals' Triple-A Omaha Royals in 2004.

Patterson died in an auto accident on March 11, 2020.
