= James Bean =

American politician

James L. Bean

Member of the Mississippi State Senate
- In office 1988–2000
- Constituency: Forrest and Lamar Counties

Personal details
- Born: James L. Bean; December 15, 1933 Clanton, Alabama, U.S.
- Died: July 7, 2013 (aged 79) Hattiesburg, Mississippi, U.S.
- Party: Republican
- Occupation: Businessman, politician

James L. "Jim" Bean (December 15, 1933 – July 7, 2013) was an American politician.

Born in Clanton, Alabama, Bean served in the United States Air Force during the Korean War. He was a business owner of Holloway Transfer and Storage in Hattiesburg, Mississippi. Bean served in the Mississippi State Senate 1988-2000 from Forrest and Lamar Counties as a Republican. He died in Hattiesburg, Mississippi.
