= Clanton, Alabama =

City in Chilton County, Alabama, U.S.

Clanton
- City
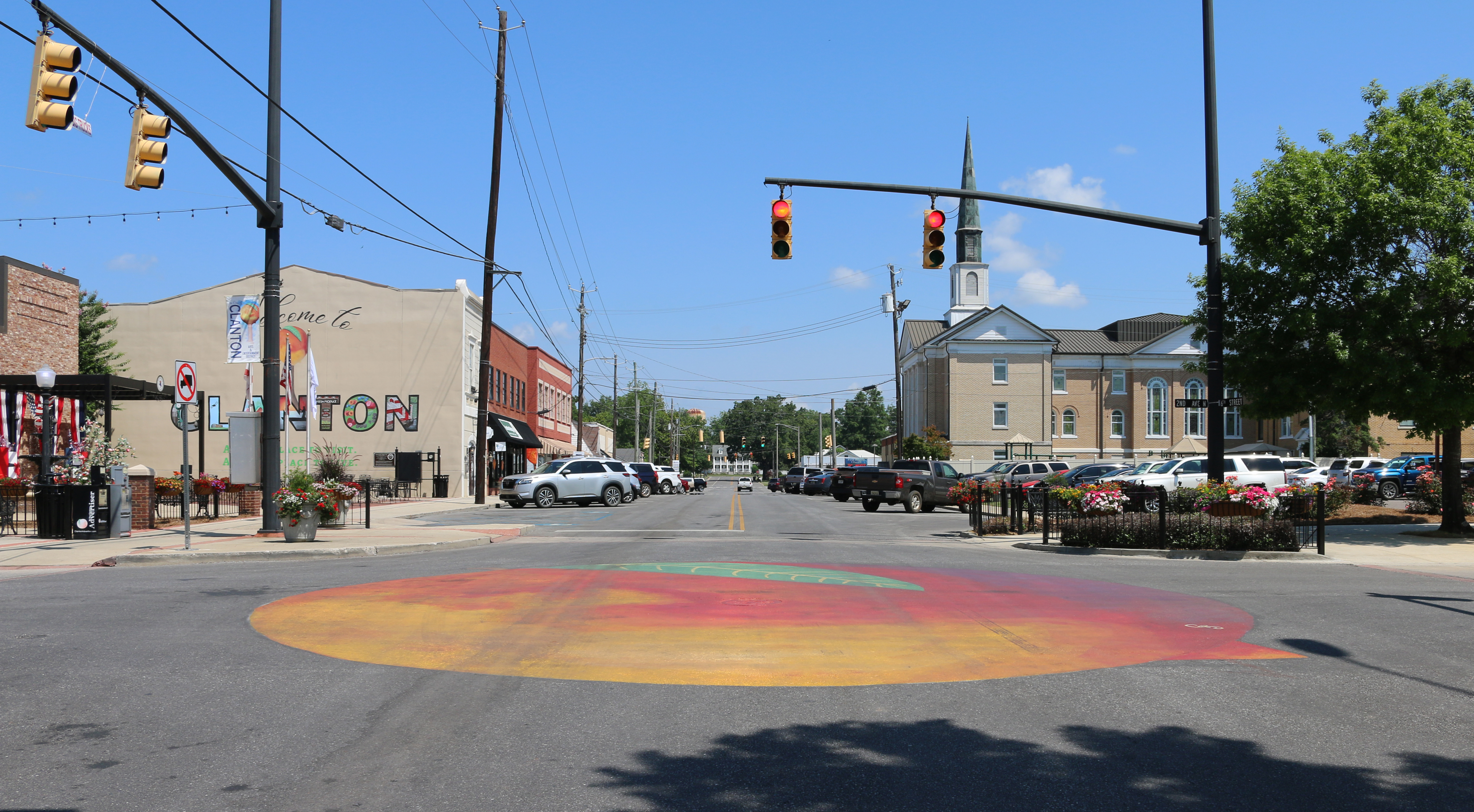
- Downtown Clanton

- Flag Seal
- Motto: "A good place to visit...a better place to live!"
- Location of Clanton in Chilton County, Alabama.
- Coordinates: 32°51′40″N 86°37′41″W
- Country: United States
- State: Alabama
- County: Chilton
- Founded: 1866
- Incorporated: April 23, 1873
- Named for: General James Holt Clanton

Government
  - Type: Council/Mayor

Area
  - Total: 23.24 sq mi (60.18 km^{2})
  - Land: 23.10 sq mi (59.83 km^{2})
  - Water: 0.14 sq mi (0.36 km^{2})
- Elevation: 558 ft (170 m)

Population (2020)
  - Total: 8,768
  - Density: 379.6/sq mi (146.5/km^{2})
- Time zone: UTC-6 (Central (CST))
  - Summer (DST): UTC-5 (CDT)
- ZIP code: 35045-35046
- Area codes: 205, 659
- FIPS code: 01-15136
- GNIS feature ID: 2404052
- Website: www.clantonal.gov

Clanton is a city in Chilton County, Alabama, United States and the county seat. It is part of the Birmingham–Hoover–Cullman Combined Statistical Area. At the 2020 census, the population was 8,768. Clanton is near the site of the geographic center of the U.S. state of Alabama.

== History ==
The area that would become Clanton was known as "Goose Pond" and nearby "Ranch" when Baker County (later renamed Chilton County) was founded on December 30, 1868. Soon thereafter (May 1871) the town of Clanton took its name from the South and North Alabama Railroad station of that name. A couple of actions solidified the name of the town. First, during the Alabama Legislative actions to allow the vote to set the permanent location of the courthouse (January - March 1871), their amendments changed the nominated name from "Baker's" to "Clanton." Finalizing the name change was an official application in May 1871 by the Postmaster to the Federal Postal System to re-designate the local Post Office as "Clanton" and terminate the former designation (Goose Pond). The railroad had named "Clanton Station" in honor of James H. Clanton, an attorney, Chairman of the Alabama Democratic Executive committee, and a former Brigadier General in the Confederate States Army. It was incorporated on April 23, 1873. Alfred Baker was elected first mayor of the town.

Nearby Lay Dam became Alabama Power's first dam in the state. Along with Mitchell Dam, built a few years later, it brought economic improvements to the area. Immigrants played a part in starting the county's peach industry more than a century ago. The peach industry is the number one industry in Chilton County, not only bringing fame to the county, but also millions of dollars to the local economy. The city of Clanton constructed a water tower in the form of a peach in 1993, becoming a landmark for travelers along Interstate 65.

Early civil rights activist Ida B. Wells reproduced a photographic postcard depicting an 1891 lynching in Clanton to educate the white public of the atrocities committed against blacks.

During World War II, a small German prisoner of war camp was located in Clanton in the former Civilian Conservation Corps (CCC) camp west of town.

== Geography ==
Clanton is located southeast of the center of Chilton County. The city is in the central part of the state along Interstate 65, which runs north to south to the east of the city, with access from exits 205, 208, and 212. Via I-65, Birmingham is 53 mi (85 km) north, and Montgomery is 40 mi (64 km) southeast. Other highways that run through the city include U.S. Route 31, which runs north to south through the center of the city, leading north 22 mi (35 km) to Calera and south 31 mi (50 km) to Prattville, and Alabama State Route 22, which leads east 29 mi (47 km) to Rockford and west 15 mi (24 km) to Maplesville.

According to the U.S. Census Bureau, the city has a total area of 22.1 square miles (57.2 km^{2}), of which 21.9 square miles (56.8 km^{2}) is land and 0.15 square miles (0.4 km^{2}), or 0.62%, is water.

=== Climate ===
The climate in this area is characterized by hot, humid summers and generally mild to cool winters. According to the Köppen Climate Classification system, Clanton has a humid subtropical climate, abbreviated Cfa on climate maps.

Climate data for Clanton, Alabama, 1991–2020 normals, extremes 1893–present
Month	Jan	Feb	Mar	Apr	May	Jun	Jul	Aug	Sep	Oct	Nov	Dec	Year
Record high °F (°C)	84 (29)	84 (29)	93 (34)	94 (34)	100 (38)	106 (41)	108 (42)	105 (41)	110 (43)	103 (39)	88 (31)	80 (27)	110 (43)
Mean maximum °F (°C)	72.0 (22.2)	75.7 (24.3)	82.5 (28.1)	85.7 (29.8)	90.3 (32.4)	94.5 (34.7)	96.6 (35.9)	96.2 (35.7)	93.3 (34.1)	86.5 (30.3)	78.8 (26.0)	72.9 (22.7)	98.0 (36.7)
Mean daily maximum °F (°C)	55.6 (13.1)	60.3 (15.7)	68.6 (20.3)	75.8 (24.3)	82.9 (28.3)	88.4 (31.3)	90.7 (32.6)	90.4 (32.4)	86.3 (30.2)	76.2 (24.6)	65.4 (18.6)	57.5 (14.2)	74.8 (23.8)
Daily mean °F (°C)	44.5 (6.9)	48.4 (9.1)	55.7 (13.2)	62.6 (17.0)	70.8 (21.6)	77.4 (25.2)	80.3 (26.8)	79.6 (26.4)	74.8 (23.8)	63.9 (17.7)	53.1 (11.7)	46.7 (8.2)	63.2 (17.3)
Mean daily minimum °F (°C)	33.4 (0.8)	36.5 (2.5)	42.8 (6.0)	49.5 (9.7)	58.6 (14.8)	66.4 (19.1)	69.9 (21.1)	68.8 (20.4)	63.3 (17.4)	51.6 (10.9)	40.9 (4.9)	35.9 (2.2)	51.5 (10.8)
Mean minimum °F (°C)	16.5 (−8.6)	20.6 (−6.3)	25.9 (−3.4)	33.7 (0.9)	43.7 (6.5)	56.0 (13.3)	63.0 (17.2)	61.1 (16.2)	50.3 (10.2)	35.8 (2.1)	26.1 (−3.3)	20.9 (−6.2)	14.1 (−9.9)
Record low °F (°C)	−4 (−20)	−9 (−23)	10 (−12)	26 (−3)	33 (1)	42 (6)	53 (12)	51 (11)	36 (2)	24 (−4)	8 (−13)	2 (−17)	−9 (−23)
Average precipitation inches (mm)	5.85 (149)	5.79 (147)	6.04 (153)	5.53 (140)	4.37 (111)	5.21 (132)	5.38 (137)	4.17 (106)	3.70 (94)	3.44 (87)	4.67 (119)	5.76 (146)	59.91 (1,521)
Average snowfall inches (cm)	0.0 (0.0)	0.0 (0.0)	0.5 (1.3)	0.0 (0.0)	0.0 (0.0)	0.0 (0.0)	0.0 (0.0)	0.0 (0.0)	0.0 (0.0)	0.0 (0.0)	0.0 (0.0)	0.0 (0.0)	0.5 (1.3)
Average precipitation days (≥ 0.01 in)	10.1	10.0	9.1	8.1	8.4	10.5	11.9	9.3	7.1	6.9	7.7	9.7	108.8
Average snowy days (≥ 0.1 in)	0.0	0.0	0.0	0.0	0.0	0.0	0.0	0.0	0.0	0.0	0.0	0.0	0.0
Source 1: NOAA
Source 2: National Weather Service

== Demographics ==
Historical population
Census	Pop.	Note	%±
1890	623		—
1900	611		−1.9%
1910	1,123		83.8%
1920	1,411		25.6%
1930	1,847		30.9%
1940	3,982		115.6%
1950	4,640		16.5%
1960	5,683		22.5%
1970	5,868		3.3%
1980	5,832		−0.6%
1990	7,669		31.5%
2000	7,800		1.7%
2010	8,619		10.5%
2020	8,768		1.7%
U.S. Decennial Census; 2013 Estimate 2020

=== Racial and ethnic composition ===
Clanton city, Alabama – Racial and ethnic composition Note: the US Census treats Hispanic/Latino as an ethnic category. This table excludes Latinos from the racial categories and assigns them to a separate category. Hispanics/Latinos may be of any race.
Race / Ethnicity (NH = Non-Hispanic)	Pop 1980	Pop 1990	Pop 2000	Pop 2010	Pop 2020	% 1980	% 1990	% 2000	% 2010	% 2020
White alone (NH)	4,678	6,162	5,950	6,304	6,132	80.21%	80.35%	76.28%	73.14%	69.94%
Black or African American alone (NH)	1,086	1,461	1,536	1,620	1,620	18.62%	19.05%	19.69%	18.80%	18.48%
Native American or Alaska Native alone (NH)	0	7	23	24	25	0.00%	0.09%	0.29%	0.28%	0.29%
Asian alone (NH)	0	14	26	51	84	0.00%	0.18%	0.33%	0.59%	0.96%
Native Hawaiian or Pacific Islander alone (NH)	x	x	0	5	2	x	x	0.00%	0.06%	0.02%
Other race alone (NH)	0	0	9	11	36	0.00%	0.00%	0.12%	0.13%	0.41%
Mixed race or Multiracial (NH)	x	x	50	84	296	x	x	0.64%	0.97%	3.38%
Hispanic or Latino (any race)	68	25	206	520	573	1.17%	0.33%	2.64%	6.03%	6.54%
Total	5,832	7,669	7,800	8,619	8,768	100.00%	100.00%	100.00%	100.00%	100.00%

=== 2020 census ===
As of the 2020 census, Clanton had a population of 8,768. There were 3,511 households and 3,882 housing units.

The median age was 40.7 years. 22.7% of residents were under the age of 18 and 19.8% were 65 years of age or older. For every 100 females there were 87.3 males, and for every 100 females age 18 and over there were 84.7 males age 18 and over.

70.5% of residents lived in urban areas, while 29.5% lived in rural areas.

Of the 3,511 households, 32.2% had children under the age of 18 living in them. Married-couple households made up 41.9% of all households, 16.7% had a male householder with no spouse or partner present, and 35.3% had a female householder with no spouse or partner present. About 31.2% of all households were made up of individuals, and 14.3% had someone living alone who was 65 years of age or older.

Of the 3,882 housing units, 9.6% were vacant. The homeowner vacancy rate was 1.9% and the rental vacancy rate was 9.0%.

=== 2000 census ===
As of the census of 2000, there were 7,800 people, 3,168 households, and 2,128 families residing in the city. The population density was 383.8 inhabitants per square mile (148.2/km^{2}). There were 3,510 housing units at an average density of 172.7 per square mile (66.7/km^{2}). The racial makeup of the city was 46.31% White, 46.01% Black or African American, 1.29% Native American, 0.33% Asian, 0.01% Pacific Islander, 1.29% from other races, and 0.74% from two or more races. 2.64% of the population were Hispanic or Latino of any race.

There were 3,168 households, out of which 29.0% had children under the age of 18 living with them, 47.3% were married couples living together, 16.5% had a female householder with no husband present, and 32.8% were non-families. 29.9% of all households were made up of individuals, and 16.0% had someone living alone who was 65 years of age or older. The average household size was 2.37 and the average family size was 2.93.

In the city, the population was spread out, with 23.8% under the age of 18, 8.0% from 18 to 24, 27.2% from 25 to 44, 23.0% from 45 to 64, and 18.0% who were 65 years of age or older. The median age was 39 years. For every 100 females, there were 86.6 males. For every 100 females age 18 and over, there were 81.6 males.

The median income for a household in the city was $30,394, and the median income for a family was $37,568. Males had a median income of $32,484 versus $20,344 for females. The per capita income for the city was $15,299. About 15.1% of families and 19.5% of the population were below the poverty line, including 27.5% of those under age 18 and 14.0% of those age 65 or over.

== Economy ==
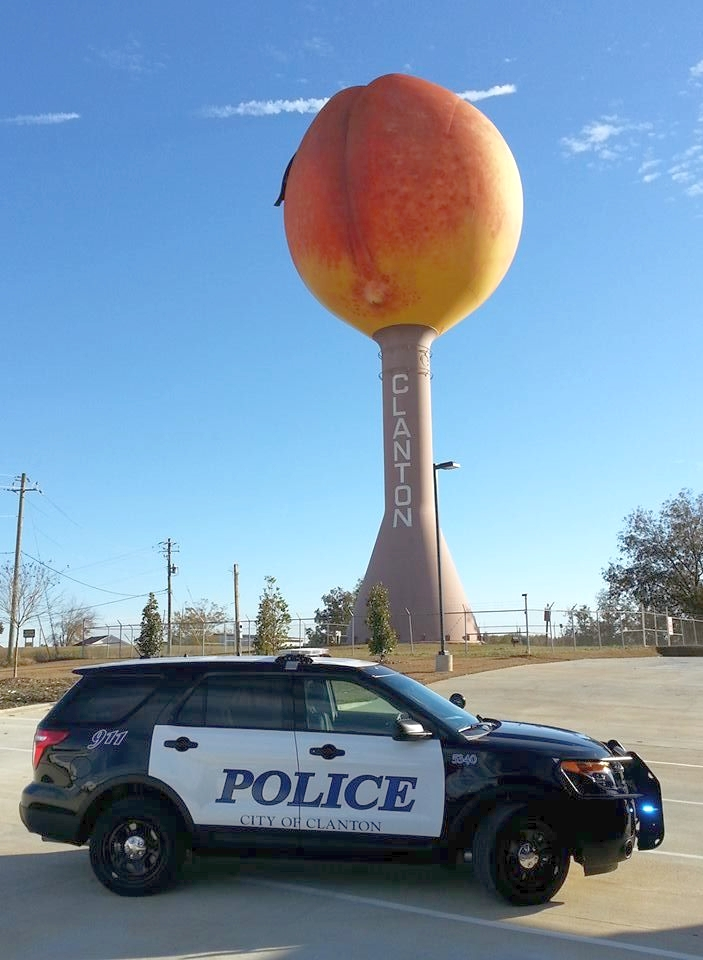
Clanton peach water tower and police car

Over 80% of Alabama's peach crop comes from Chilton County. Perhaps Clanton's most recognizable landmark is its peach-shaped water tower, which celebrates the community's agricultural significance.

The City of Clanton has a jurisdiction of approximately 30 square miles and over 30,000 people travel through Clanton every day.

One of the biggest events each year in Chilton County is the annual Peach Festival held in Clanton in June. A Peach Queen is crowned each year at the festival and a Peach Parade and the Peach Jam Jubilee, a music concert and street fair, are part of festival events.

== Arts and culture ==
Clanton has hosted the annual Chilton County Peach Festival since 1952.

The Clanton Conference and Performing Arts Center is a multi-purpose facility adjacent to the Jefferson State Community College–Clanton campus.

== Parks and recreation ==
Clanton Parks and recreations facilities include:

- Clanton City Park & City Pool
- Corner Park
- E.M. Henry Skills Center & Pool
- Goosepond Park
- Ollie Park
- Clanton Recreation Center

== Government ==
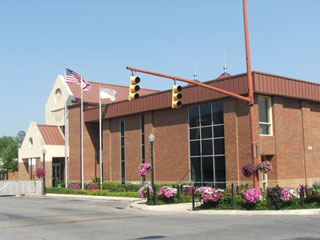
Clanton City Hall

Clanton is governed via the mayor-council system. The mayor is elected in a citywide vote. The city council consists of five members elected from one of five wards.

Billy Joe Driver served as mayor for more than 35 years, from 1984 until July 9, 2020, when he died from COVID-19. He was 84 years old. He had planned to retire in January 2021.

== Education ==
The Chilton County School District provides public education for Clanton. Students in Clanton may attend any public school in Chilton County. Schools include:

- Chilton County High School
- LeCroy Technical Center
- Clanton Middle School
- Clanton Intermediate School
- Clanton Elementary School

Jefferson State Community College - Chilton-Clanton Campus is located here.

== Media ==
=== Newspaper ===
- The Clanton Advertiser (daily)
- Chilton County News (weekly)

=== Radio ===
- WKLF - Southern Gospel 95.5FM & 1000AM 5am to 5pm, 95.5 FM "The Peach" 5 Decades Of Rock and Roll Oldies (50s, 60s, 70s, 80s, & 90s) 5pm to 5am, wklfradio.com and thepeach.live online.
- WPJN - Praise 89.3FM, Contemporary Gospel

== Infrastructure ==
Chilton County Airport, also known as Gragg-Wade Field, is a public use airport located east of Clanton.

Chilton County Transit provides dial-a-ride bus transit service to the city.

Clanton has a 30-bed hospital with 24-hour emergency care.

== Notable people ==
- Randall Atcheson, concert pianist
- James Bean, former member of the Mississippi State Senate
- Clay Carroll, Major League Baseball player
- Wesley Dennis, country music artist
- Amariah Farrow, former professional football player
- Jackie Hayes, major league baseball player
- Jackson W. Moore, former CEO of Union Planters Bank and Regions Financial Corporation
- Clarence H. Mullins, judge for the United States District Court for the Northern District of Alabama
- Melinda Mullins, actress
- Jarrod Patterson, major league baseball player
- Mac Powell, lead singer for the Christian rock band Third Day
- Demarcus Riddick, 4-star linebacker for Auburn University
- Drew Roy, actor
- Grayson Russell, child actor
