= Amariah Farrow =

American gridiron football player (born 1980)

Profile
- Position: Offensive line

Personal information
- Born: September 29, 1980 (age 46); Clanton, Alabama, U.S.

Career information
- College: Midwestern State University

Career history
- 2005–2007: BC Lions
- 2008: Saskatchewan Roughriders
- 2009: Kentucky Horsemen

Awards and highlights
- Grey Cup champion (2006)
- Stats at CFL.ca

Amariah Farrow (born September 29, 1980) is an American former professional football offensive lineman. He is 6 feet 5 inches (1.96 m) tall and weighs 325 pounds (147 kg). For his college career, Farrow went to Midwestern State University. After college (2005), he signed with the Lions as a free agent. Farrow spent the majority of the 2005 CFL season on the practice roster. He made his CFL debut during week 16 versus the Montreal Alouettes and backed up B.C.'s offensive line in 2 games in October of that season. In 2006, Farrow spent the first 4 weeks on the Lions 46-man roster but did not see any action. He started his only game that year in week 19 (last week of the season) against the Winnipeg Blue Bombers. In 2007, Farrow was made a backup because of the departure of Bobby Singh to the Calgary Stampeders. He was traded to the Saskatchewan Roughriders prior to the 2008 CFL season.
