= Jemison High School (Jemison, Alabama) =

Coordinates: 32.823°N 86.612°W

Location
- 25195 US Highway 31; Jemison, Alabama, 35085; United States

Information
- Type: Public Secondary
- School district: Chilton County School District
- CEEB code: 011550
- Principal: Kendall Jackson
- Headmaster: Mr Doginson
- Teaching staff: 31.20 (FTE)
- Grades: 9–12
- Enrollment: 685 (2023–2024)
- Student to teacher ratio: 21.96
- Colors: Navy and white
- Mascot: Panther
- Website: jhs.chiltonboe.com

Jemison High School is a secondary school located in Jemison, Alabama, which educates grades 9-12. The school mascot is the Panther. The marching band is the Jemison Blue Regiment Band. There are two concert band groups; the advanced group is the Jemison High School Wind Ensemble and the second group is the Jemison High School Concert Band. JHS has a football team, baseball team, basketball team, archery club, golf team, volleyball and more. JHS boasts an active VEX Robotics team (TSA) as well as an extensive Culinary Arts department.
