= Maplesville, Alabama =

- Town
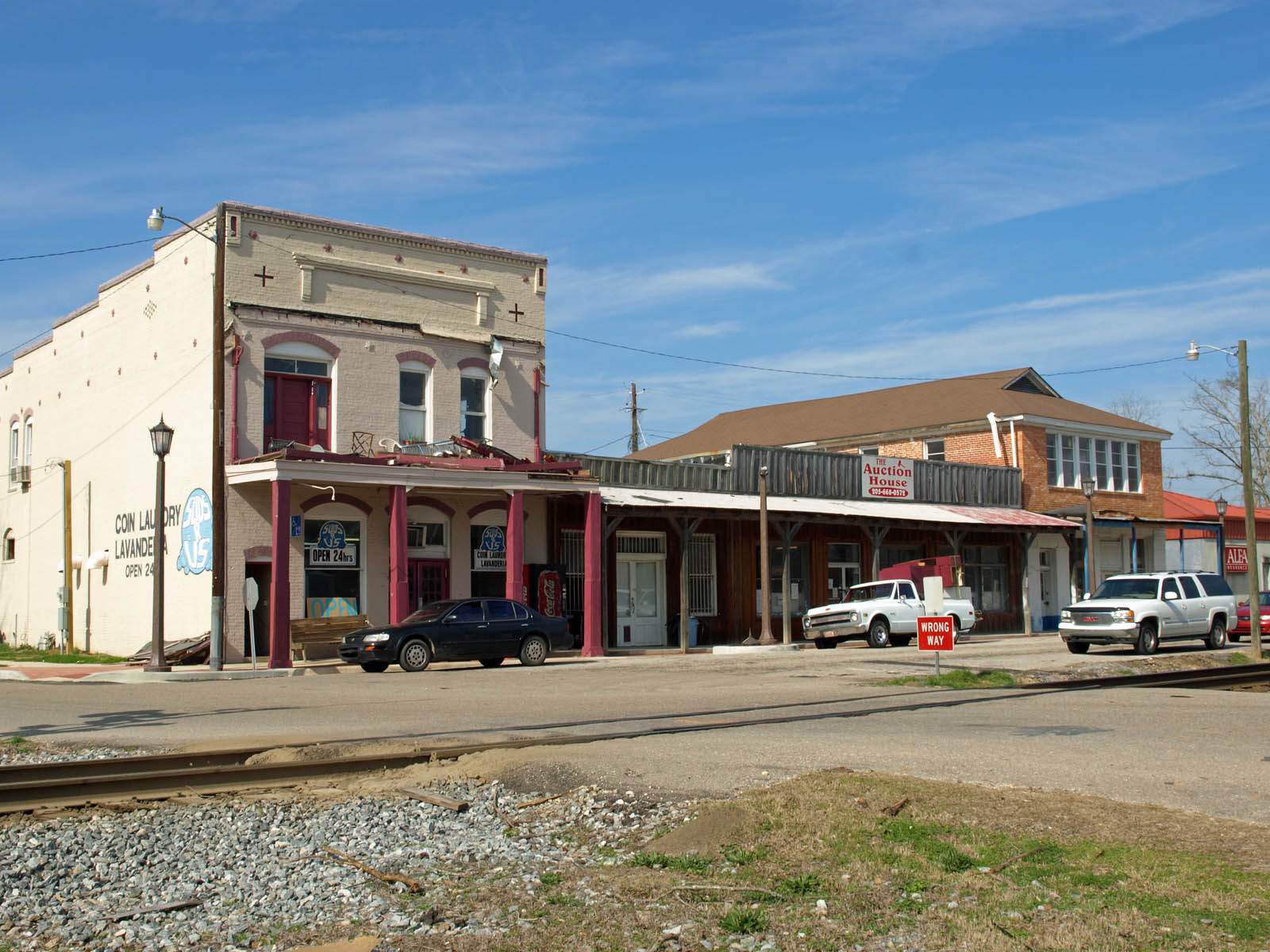

- Location within Alabama
- Coordinates: 32°46′55″N 86°52′32″W
- Country: United States
- State: Alabama
- County: Chilton

Area
  - Total: 3.47 sq mi (9.00 km^{2})
  - Land: 3.43 sq mi (8.89 km^{2})
  - Water: 0.042 sq mi (0.11 km^{2})
- Elevation: 351 ft (107 m)

Population (2020)
  - Total: 637
  - Density: 185.5/sq mi (71.63/km^{2})
- Time zone: UTC-6 (Central (CST))
  - Summer (DST): UTC-5 (CDT)
- ZIP code: 36750
- Area code: 334
- FIPS code: 01-46504
- GNIS feature ID: 2406093
- Website: www.townofmaplesville.com

Maplesville is a town in Chilton County, Alabama, United States. At the 2020 census, the population was 637. It is located approximately halfway between Tuscaloosa and Montgomery on U.S. Route 82.

== History ==
=== Old Maplesville ===
The town of Maplesville first began to grow in a location 3 miles (5 km) east of its present location, near Mulberry Creek. Located roughly 62 miles (100 km) south-east of Tuscaloosa, it was in what was Bibb County at the time, as Baker/Chilton had not yet been created. European settlers migrated to the area from Georgia and the Carolinas following the Battle of Horseshoe Bend in 1814, after the Native Americans who had been living there were defeated. The town was named after Stephen W. Maples, a merchant and the town's first postmaster, the post-office being at his store.

The town was originally located at the crossroads (Note: undesignated on an 1836 map of Alabama investigated by Melba Patton Peterson, at 32°48′33″N 086°49′06″W per the GNIS) of two important trading routes: the Elyton Road from Selma to Birmingham, and the Fort Jackson Road from Tuscaloosa to Montgomery. By 1850, the original town of Maplesville had a population of 809. The town had two horse-racing tracks, which brought visitors to the town, and had several inns and taverns to accommodate the stagecoach traffic.

=== Cuba, the new Maplesville ===
The original town site began to decline in the early 1850s, after two railway lines were completed 3 miles (5 km) west of the town. They had been routed through a small settlement that was named Cuba at the time. Residents and businesspeople from the original Maplesville began moving closer to the railroad, and when the Maplesville Post Office was relocated to the railroad town in 1856, the new town was renamed Maplesville. The original town site gradually became deserted, and all that remains today is the Old Maplesville Cemetery.

Because of Maplesville's abundant rail access, it became a shipping point for cotton and other goods from the surrounding area.

Maplesville continued to prosper after the Gulf, Mobile and Ohio Railroad ran a line through the town in 1897, and many of the historic buildings in the town today were built during that period. In 1901, a lumber mill opened near the town, and the town's population grew as people moved to Maplesville to work at the mill. Maplesville incorporated in 1914, but the incorporation soon lapsed because the town failed to hold elections after the initial round. It reincorporated in 1947, and by 1951 had established a telephone system, garbage pick-up, and water system.

A new town hall was completed in 1975.

=== Historic sites ===
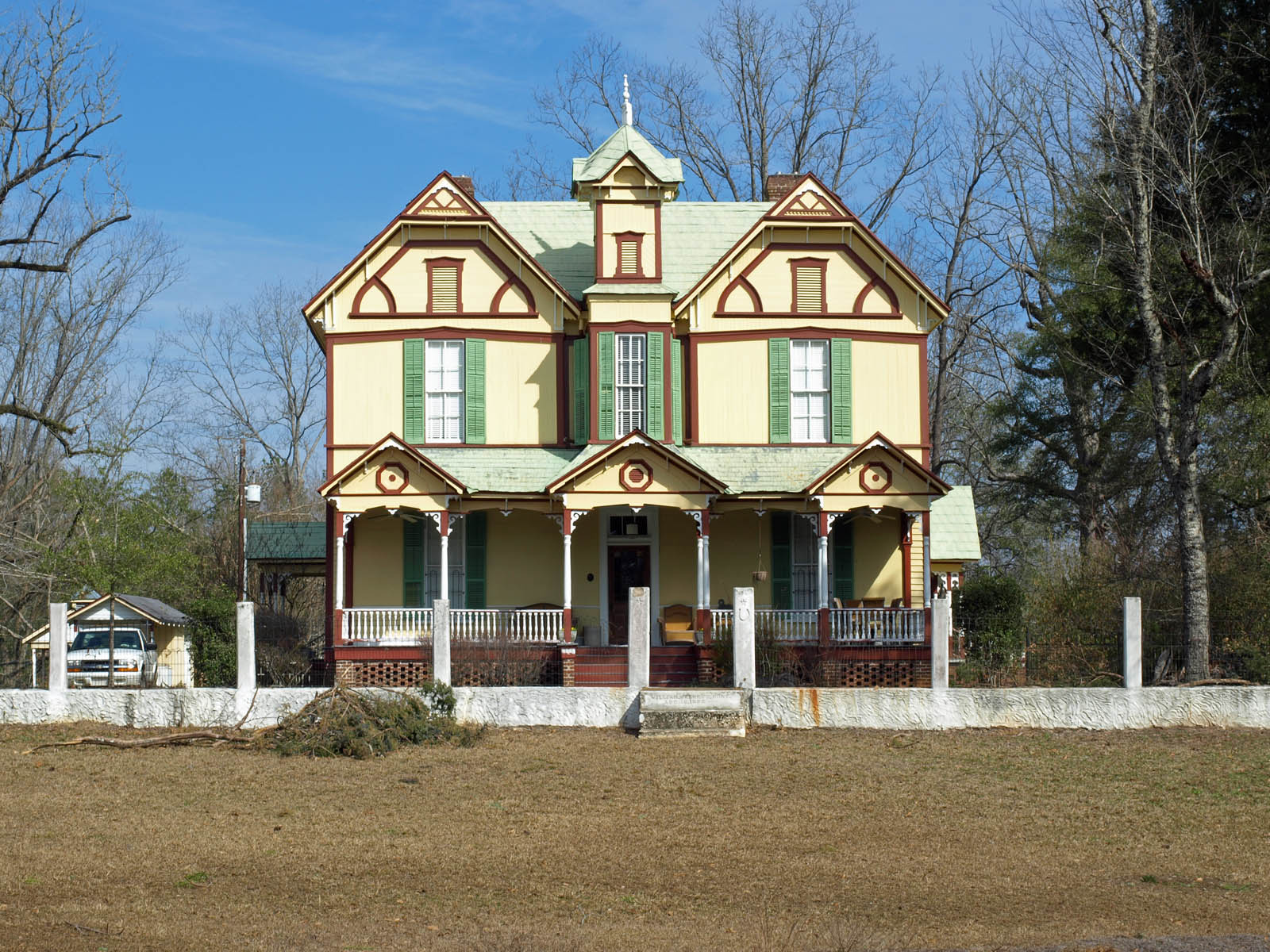
The Walker-Klinner Farm (32°48′9″N 86°48′25″W) near to the original location of Maplesville

There are four historic sites currently listed in Maplesville. The Walker-Klinner Farm is listed on the National Register of Historic Places, and the following three locations are listed on the Alabama Register of Landmarks and Heritage:

- Maplesville Depot (circa 1912; listed November 23, 1976).
- Maplesville Methodist Episcopal Church (circa 1870–1890; listed December 4, 1992).
- Maplesville Railroad Historic District (19th–20th century; listed September 26, 2003).

==== Maplesville Depot ====
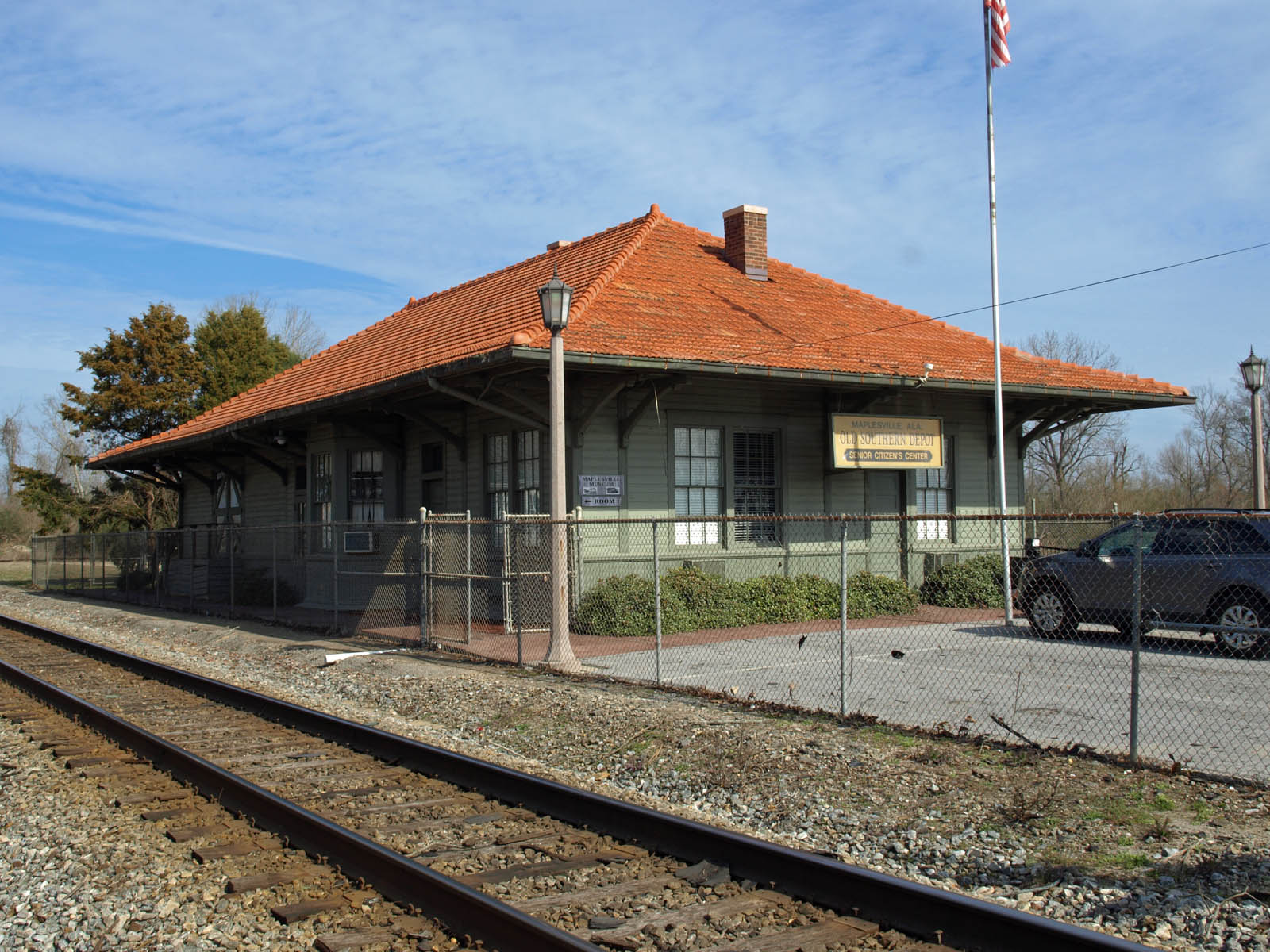
The Maplesville Depot (32°47′20.87″N 86°52′11.44″W) as it stood in 2012

Maplesville's first railroad depot was constructed when the Alabama and Tennessee River Railroad arrived in 1853. In 1865, the depot was destroyed in a raid by Union general James H. Wilson, as Wilson's Raiders marched on to Selma. It was replaced soon after the Civil War, but was destroyed by fire in 1911. The fire had begun at a building owned by a local merchant, R. H. Martin, and had spread to several nearby wood-frame structures, one of which was the depot. It was reconstructed in 1912 and has continued to stand thereafter.

The Maplesville High School (Note: at 32°48′11″N 086°52′42″W per the GNIS) was accredited in 1932. Before then, children had to take the train to and from Plantersville, the location of the Dallas County High School. It cost US$4.89 (equivalent to $103.52 in 2025) for a book of one month's worth of return tickets for a student on the number 19 train. Dallas County High arranged for its classes to begin after the arrival of the train from Maplesville, with local students attending a study hall in the morning until the others arrived.

By 2022 the Depot was being used as a senior citizen recreation centre. It had been remodelled with new kitchens and restrooms for use in a meals on wheels program for senior citizens as part of the celebrations of the United States Bicentennial in 1976. Of the GM&O railroad, only the railbed remains.

==== Old Maplesville Cemetery ====
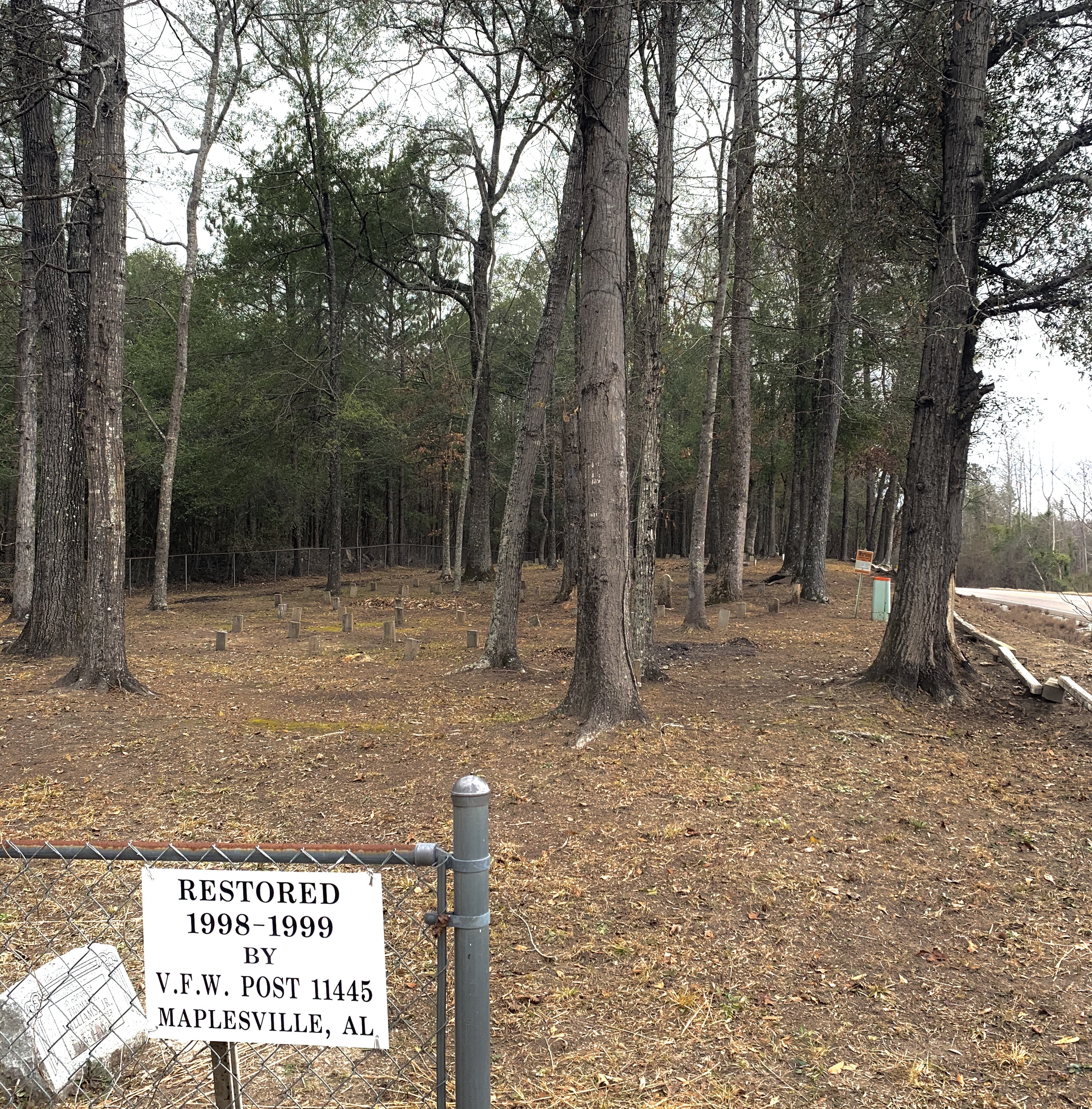
The entrance to the Old Maplesville Cemetery (32°48′30″N 086°49′11″W)

The Old Maplesville Cemetery, at the site of the original Maplesville, is located along what is now Highway 191. It contains many of the town's original inhabitants. This cemetery is also home to the oldest grave in Chilton County, dating back to 1833. However, the cemetery is just a fraction of its former size. Today, roughly 50 of the original tombstones remain. During the construction of Highway 191, several of the graves were destroyed during the process.

== Geography ==
Maplesville is located in southwestern Chilton County along U.S. Route 82, which runs northwest to southeast on the south side of town. Tuscaloosa is 55 mi (89 km) to the northwest, and Montgomery is 49 mi (79 km) to the southeast, both via US-82. Alabama State Route 22 runs west to east through the center of town, leading east 15 mi (24 km) to Clanton, the Chilton County seat, and southwest 29 mi (47 km) to Selma.

According to the U.S. Census Bureau, the town has a total area of 3.3 square miles (8.6 km^{2}), of which 3.3 square miles (8.5 km^{2}) is land and 0.04 square miles (0.1 km^{2}), or 1.22%, is water.

== Demographics ==
Historical population
Census	Pop.	Note	%±
1920	376		—
1930	456		21.3%
1950	806		—
1960	679		−15.8%
1970	596		−12.2%
1980	754		26.5%
1990	725		−3.8%
2000	672		−7.3%
2010	708		5.4%
2020	637		−10.0%
U.S. Decennial Census; 2013 Estimate

=== 2020 census ===
Maplesville racial composition
Race	Num.	Perc.
White (non-Hispanic)	439	68.92%
Black or African American (non-Hispanic)	154	24.18%
Native American	4	0.63%
Other/Mixed	28	4.4%
Hispanic or Latino	12	1.88%

As of the 2020 United States census, there were 637 people, 246 households, and 163 families residing in the town.

=== 2007 ===
As of the census of 2007, there were 2500 people, 268 households, and 183 families residing in the town. The population density was 205.8 inhabitants per square mile (79.5/km^{2}). There were 313 housing units at an average density of 95.9 per square mile (37.0/km^{2}). The racial makeup of the town was 69.94% White, 29.61% Black or African American and 0.45% Native American. 0.89% of the population were Hispanic or Latino of any race.

There were 268 households, out of which 32.8% had children under the age of 18 living with them, 52.2% were married couples living together, 11.9% had a female householder with no husband present, and 31.7% were non-families. 30.2% of all households were made up of individuals, and 12.7% had someone living alone who was 65 years of age or older. The average household size was 2.51 and the average family size was 3.13.

In the town, the population was spread out, with 25.3% under the age of 18, 10.1% from 18 to 24, 26.9% from 25 to 44, 23.5% from 45 to 64, and 14.1% who were 65 years of age or older. The median age was 37 years. For every 100 females, there were 95.9 males. For every 100 females age 18 and over, there were 88.0 males.

The median income for a household in the town was $27,500, and the median income for a family was $36,250. Males had a median income of $31,042 versus $22,361 for females. The per capita income for the town was $12,777. About 12.6% of families and 20.1% of the population were below the poverty line, including 26.7% of those under age 18 and 16.0% of those age 65 or over.

== Notable people ==
- Tommie Agee, former running back for the Dallas Cowboys.
- Randall Atcheson, classical pianist

== Gallery ==
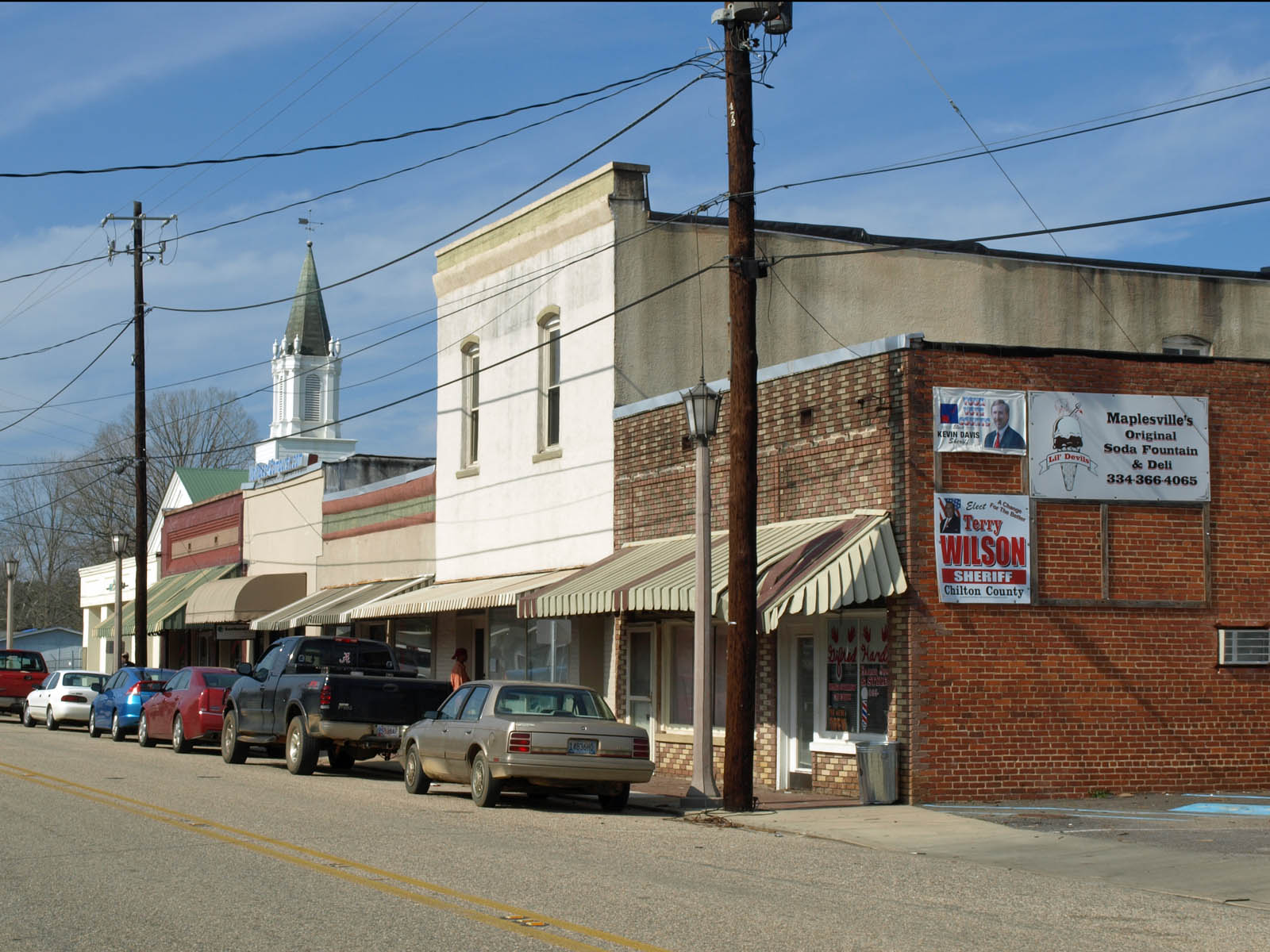

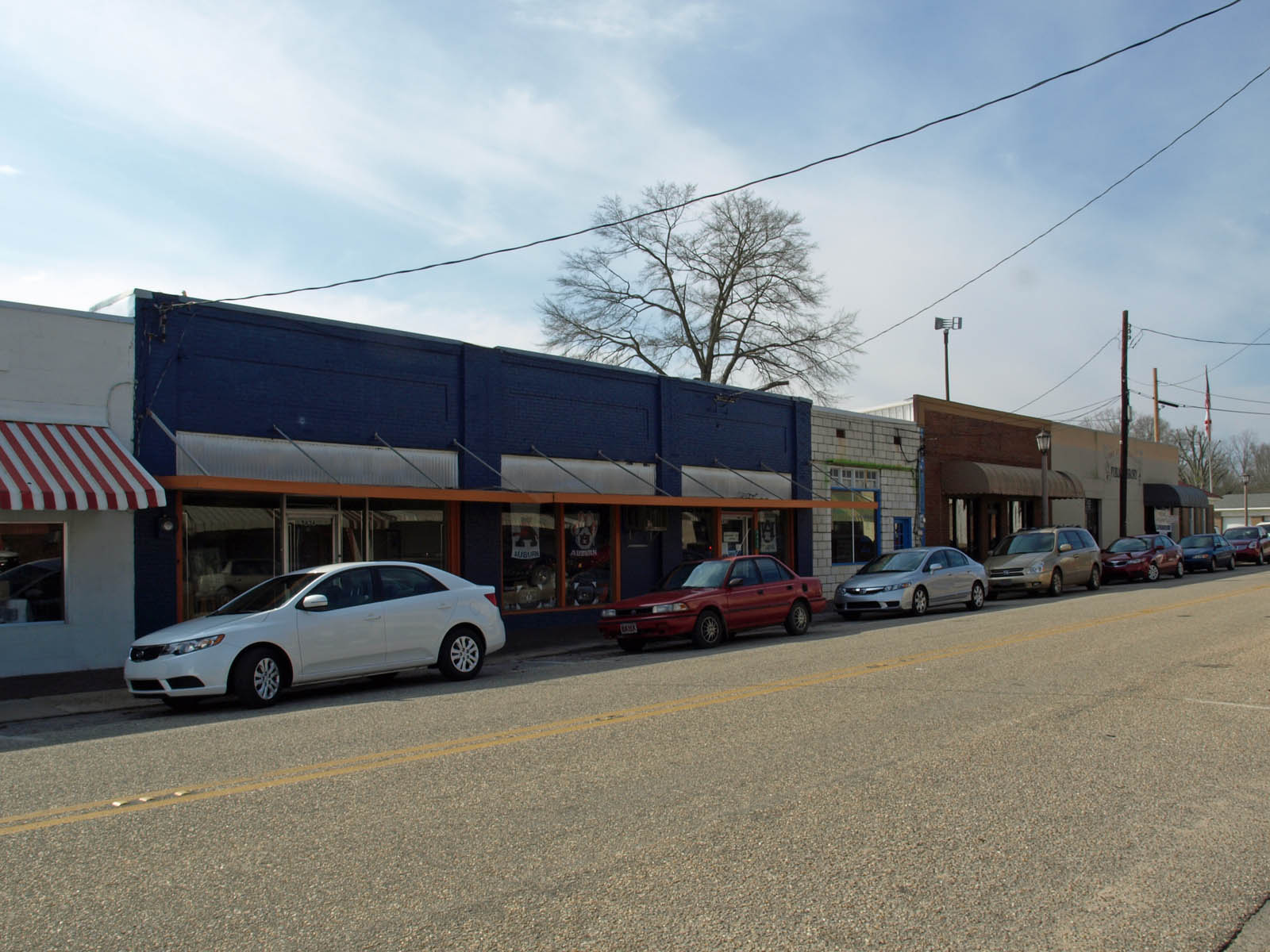

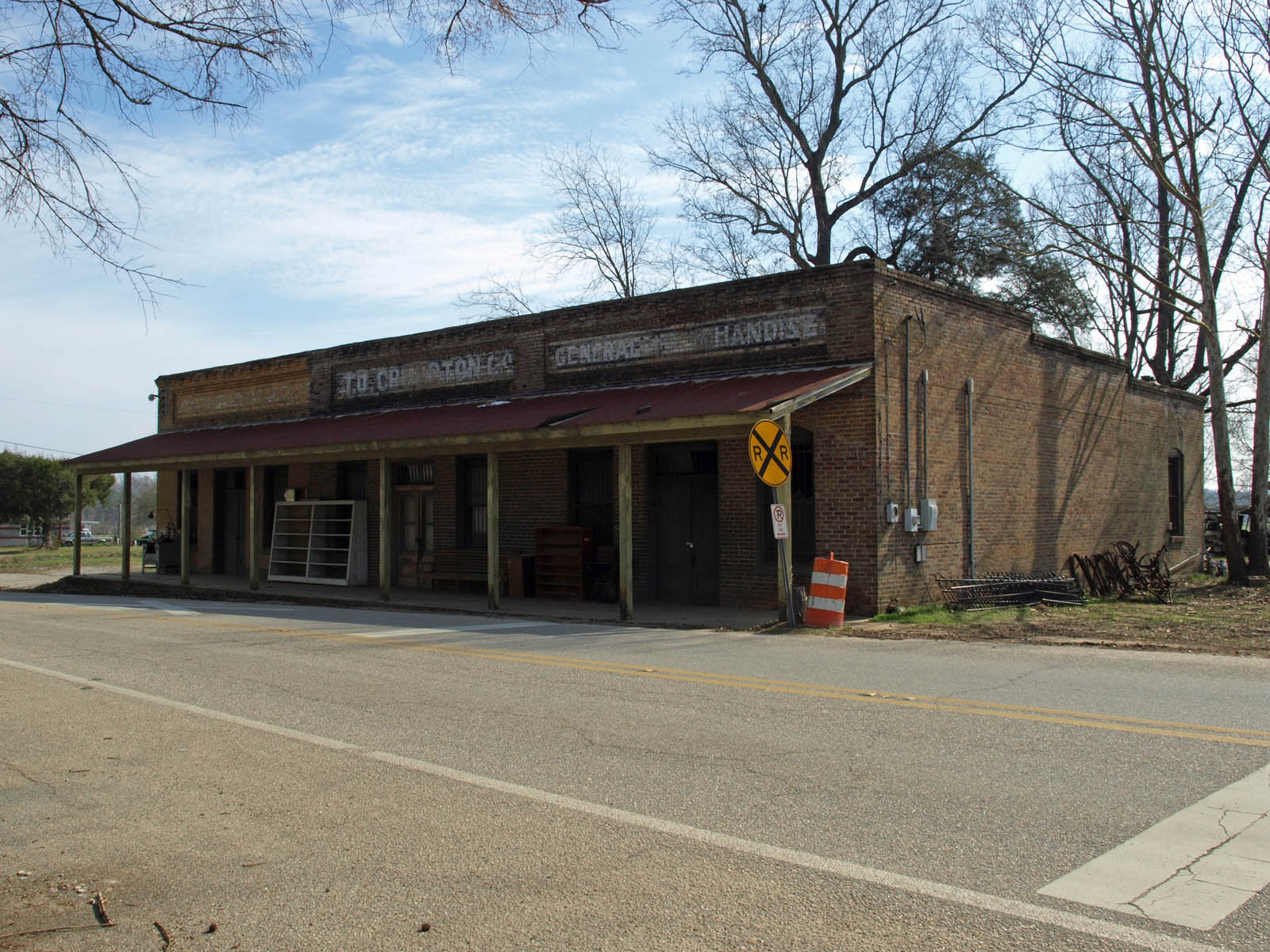

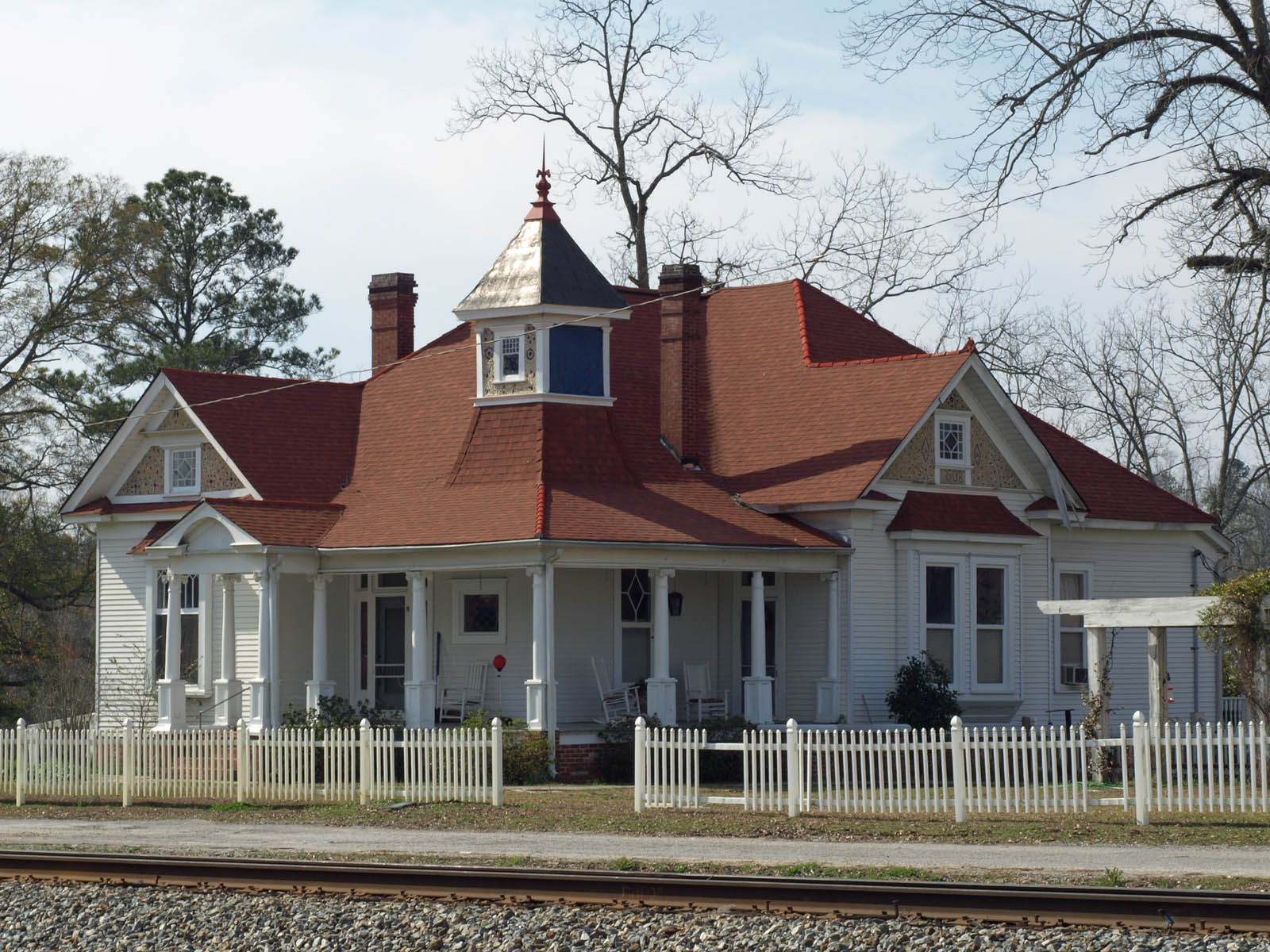

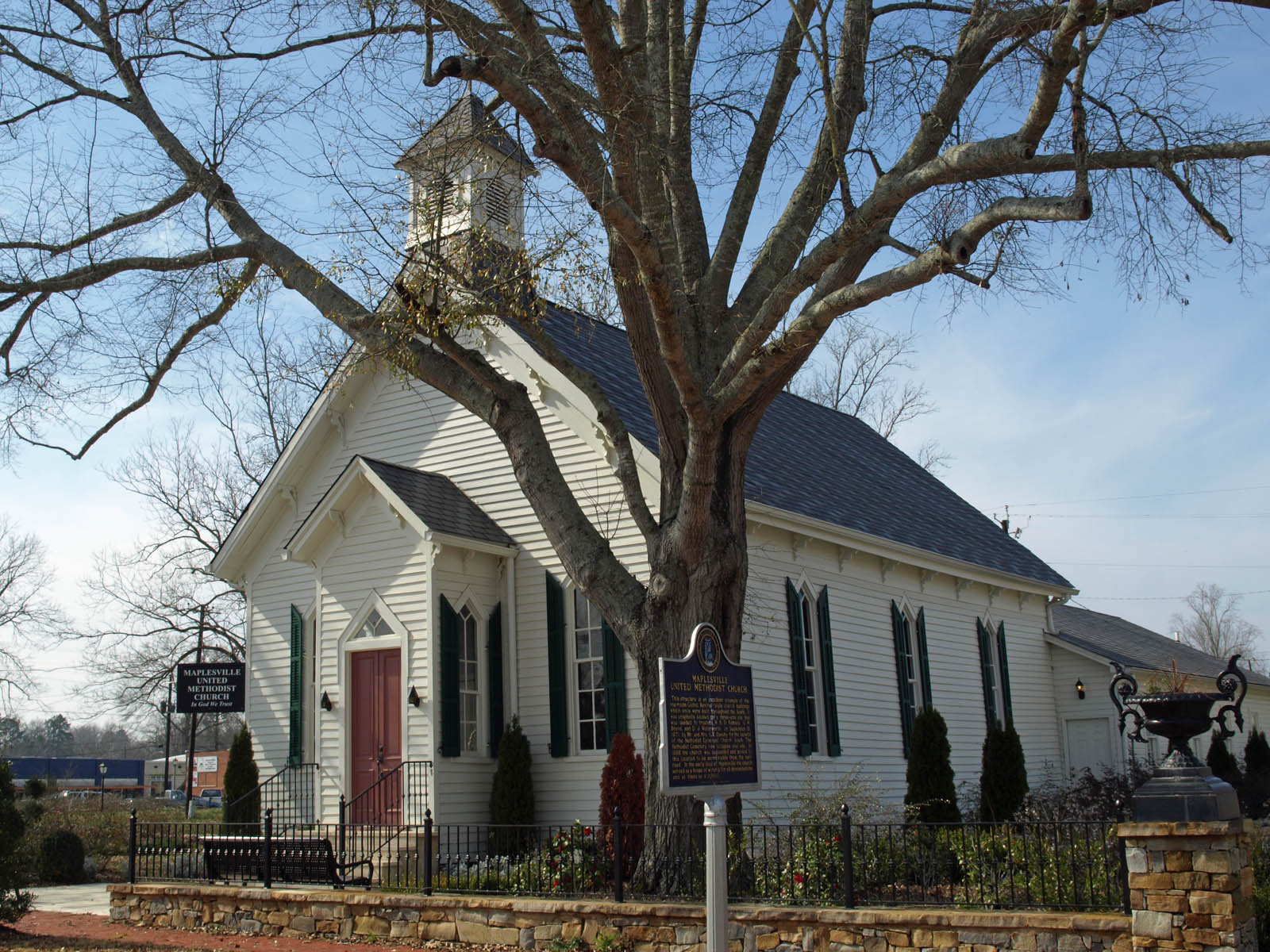
The Maplesville United Methodist Church at 220 Railroad Street (32°47′23″N 86°52′14″W)
