= Wesley Dennis (singer) =

American singer-songwriter

- Born: April 22, 1963 (age 63)
- Origin: Clanton, Alabama, United States
- Genre: Country
- Occupation: Singer-songwriter
- Instrument: Vocals
- Years active: 1995-2002, 2012–present
- Labels: Mercury Nashville; Dirt Road

Wesley Dennis (born April 22, 1963, in Clanton, Alabama) is an American country music artist. A native of Alabama, Dennis previously held a job installing car windshields before he took to singing in bars. In 1995, he signed to Mercury Nashville Records, releasing a self-titled debut album, and charting three singles on the Billboard Hot Country Songs charts. He also toured with Alan Jackson that same year.

Dennis's debut album was produced by Keith Stegall, who has also produced for Jackson, and was released on March 7, 1995, to mostly favorable reviews. New Country magazine critic Chris Dickinson gave it three-and-a-half stars out of five, calling him "as honestly neo-trad as they come", although he said that the tracks "This Hat Ain't No Act" and "Bubbaland" were "dime-a-gross." USA Today also gave a favorable review, comparing Dennis' vocals to those of Keith Whitley, but criticizing "This Hat Ain't No Act" as a "trite" song.

== Discography ==
=== Albums ===
Title	Album details
Wesley Dennis	Release date: March 7, 1995; Label: Mercury Nashville
Country to the Core	Release date: 1999; Label: Self-released
Country Enough	Release date: 2012; Label: Dirt Road Records
Then And One More Day	Release date: 2021; Label: KDM Records

=== Singles ===
Year	Single	Peak chart positions		Album
Year	Single	US Country	CAN Country	Album
1995	"I Don't Know (But I've Been Told)"	46	60	Wesley Dennis
1995	"Don't Make Me Feel at Home"	51	70	Wesley Dennis
1995	"Who's Counting"	58	—	Wesley Dennis
2012	"You"	—	—	Country Enough
"—" denotes releases that did not chart

=== Music videos ===
Year	Video	Director
1995	"I Don't Know (But I've Been Told)"	Jim Hershleder
1995	"Don't Make Me Feel at Home"	
1995	"Who's Counting"	
