= Union Planters =

Former American bank holding company

Union Planters Corporation
- Trade name: Union Planters Bank
- Type: Public
- Traded as: NYSE: UPC
- Industry: Bank holding company
- Founded: September 1, 1869; 156 years ago as Union and Planters Bank
- Founder: William Farrington
- Defunct: March 28, 2008; 18 years ago
- Fate: Acquired by Regions Financial Corporation
- Successor: Regions Financial Corporation
- Headquarters: Memphis, Tennessee
- Number of locations: 760
- Area served: Alabama, Arkansas, Florida, Illinois, Indiana, Iowa, Kentucky, Louisiana, Mississippi, Missouri, Tennessee, and Texas
- Products: Financial services
- Website: Archived website

Union Planters Bank was a United States financial institution and multi-state bank holding corporation headquartered in Memphis, Tennessee prior to being acquired by Regions Financial Corporation. With over $34 billion in assets, Union Planters Bank was the largest bank in Tennessee and among the 30 largest bank holding companies in the United States. Union Planters operated over 760 banking centers in the states of Alabama, Arkansas, Florida, Illinois, Indiana, Iowa, Kentucky, Louisiana, Mississippi, Missouri, Tennessee, and Texas.

== History ==
=== Founding (1868 – 1874) ===
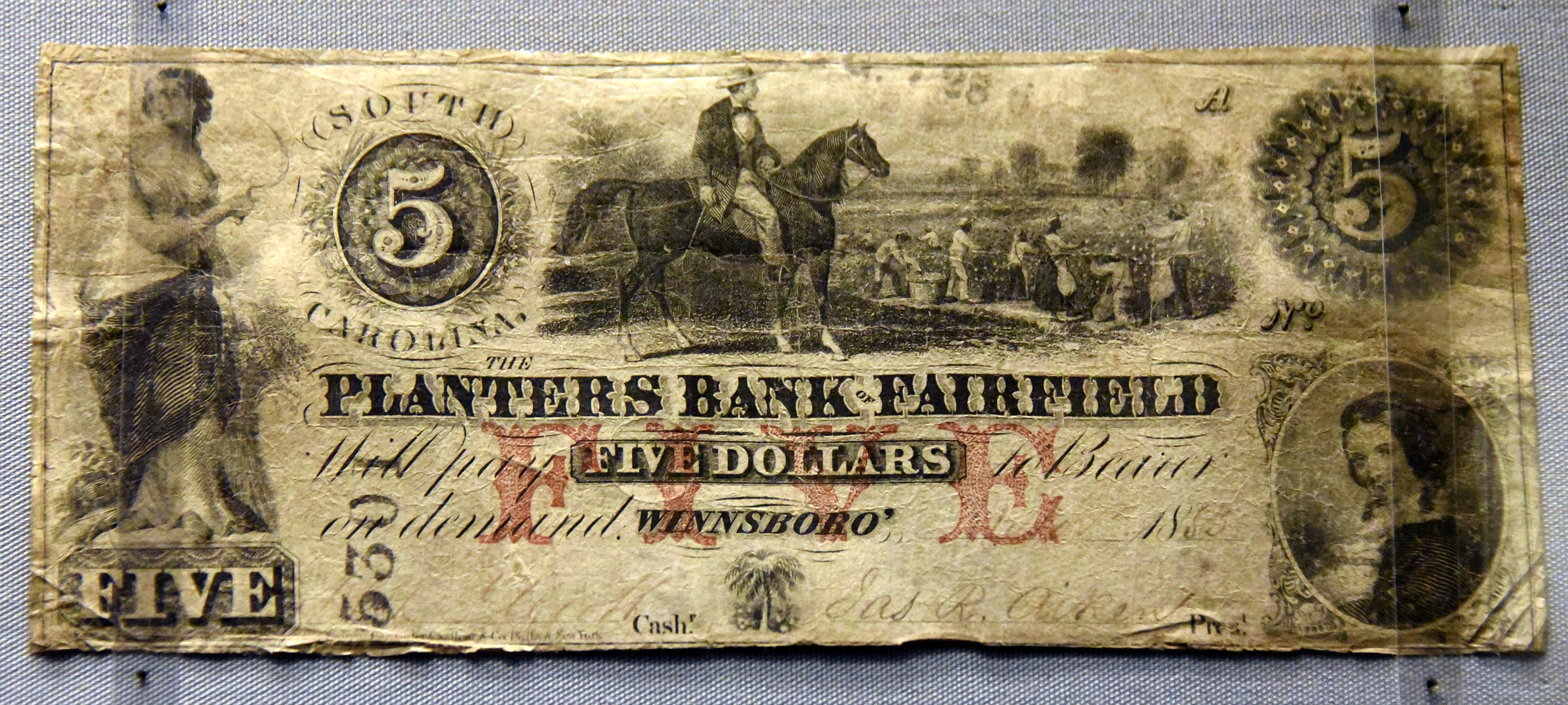
5 dollar banknote showing a plantation scene with enslaved people in South Carolina. Issued by the Planters Bank, Winnsboro, 1853. On display at the British Museum in London

Union and Planters Bank was founded by William Farrington, a Memphis businessman who had prospered during the American Civil War and emerged the wealthy head of an insurance company. In 1868, Farrington and the Board of Directors of Desoto Insurance Company applied to convert the company to a bank and they received government approval on February 12, 1869. Prior to the Civil War, the two most prominent banks in Memphis were Union Bank and the Branch Planters Bank. The assets of both, however, were seized during the war and the two banks had ceased to exist. Hoping to capitalize on the defunct antebellum banks' names, Farrington and the Board named their new bank Union and Planters. The board sold $671,300 in stock and established offices in a three-story brownstone in the Memphis financial district. On September 1, 1869, Union and Planters officially opened for business.

Union and Planters' early years were plagued with overdrafts. Farrington became increasingly at odds with the members of the Board of Directors, largely due to his interest in the Memphis & Little Rock Railroad. The struggling railroad company was indebted to Union and Planters, who held loans for the railroad totaling $200,000. In 1874, the bank's directors voted to remove Farrington from office. Outraged, Farrington remained one of the bank's largest stockholders and for the next two years, became a thorn in the bank's side. He refused to pay off the railroad company's loans and he attended board meetings during which he read lengthy protests into the minutes, demanded detailed information on bank operations and voted in opposition to even the most routine measures.

=== Early growth (1874 – 1915) ===
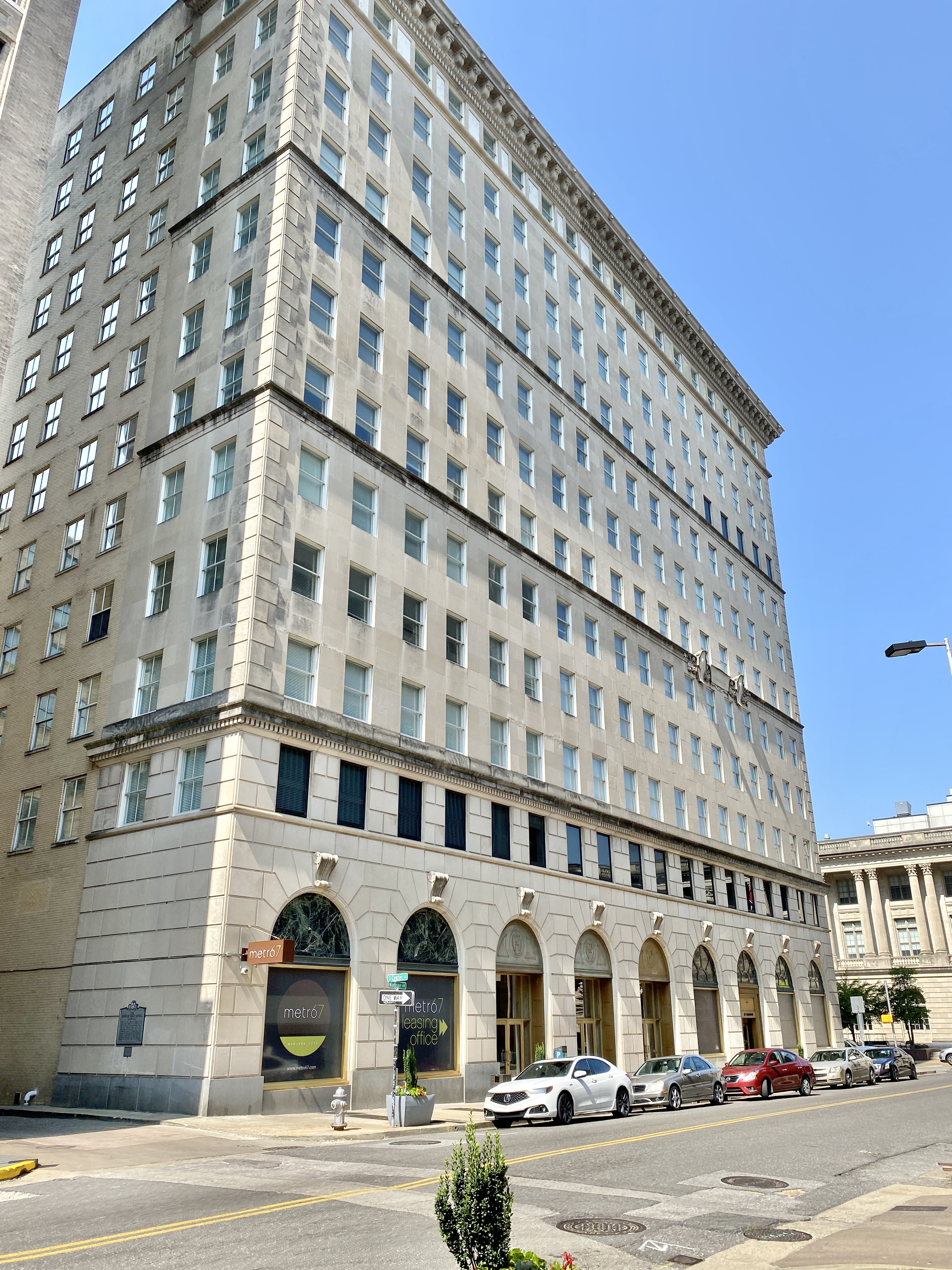
Built in 1925, this Classical Revival-style building was designed by McKim, Mead & White to serve as the home of the Union Planters Bank.

At a time of extreme financial hardship throughout the American South, Union and Planters nevertheless posted profits thanks to the sound advice the bank received from several Wall Street contacts. Napoleon Hill's assumption of the presidency in 1885, ushered in a period of growth for the bank. With little formal education, Hill had established himself in the business world as owner of a combination grocery store and saloon in Sacramento, California which he had founded amidst the 1849 gold rush. In 1857, he traveled to Memphis where he established a cotton and supply business. Like his predecessor Farrington, Hill prospered during the Civil War and emerged from it quite wealthy. Under his leadership from 1885 to 1890, Union and Planters reported profits of nearly $100,000 and deposits of more than one million dollars. With Hill at the helm, Union and Planters fared well during the depression years of the early 1890s. He suffered a stroke in 1894 but continued running the bank until a second stroke in 1897 forced him to transfer power to his "right-hand man," Samuel Read.

Samuel Read began as a clerk in a West Tennessee country store before moving to Memphis in 1857 to work in the cotton supply business. During the Civil War, he made a fortune in the dry goods trade. His reputation as an extremely conservative banker was well earned. During his leadership, new customers wishing to open an account with Union and Planters were required to have an endorsement from an established customer who, by endorsing the new account holder, assumed personal responsibility for any default. The bank's problem with overdrafts ceased—and so did the bank's growth. From 1896 to 1900, Union and Planters reported no new account holders, no increases in deposits, and few loans were extended. As a result, Union and Planters was surpassed in size by several other Memphis banks.

The end of the nineteenth century saw the popularity of trust companies surge at the expense of banks. To stimulate growth, in 1906, Union and Planters merged with Tennessee Trust Company, formerly the Security Bank of Memphis to form the Union and Planters Bank and Trust Company. By offering a wide range of services—including mortgages, trusts, savings accounts, and a brokerage for stocks and bonds. It was the first Memphis institution to take a department approach to banking. Union and Planters relocated its offices to the Tennessee Trust Building. Read stayed on as the bank's president, an office he held until his death in 1915.

=== Frank Hill era (1915 – 1924) ===
The bank's directors chose young 41-year-old Frank Hill, Napoleon Hill's son, as Read's replacement. Hill vowed to reinvigorate Union and Planters with "young blood, enterprise, aggressiveness and modern ideas." The days of his predecessor's safe and conservative stewardship of the bank was over. Hill encouraged new business and embraced innovation. In 1918 he established Union and Planters first branch location at a time when most banks operated out of a single location. This expansion was achieved by purchasing Mercantile National, a small and troubled institution renamed the Franklin Savings Bank and soon experienced strong growth. The bank celebrated its fiftieth anniversary in 1919, and Hill's leadership gave the bank every reason to celebrate. Union and Planters was now the largest bank in Memphis and one of the ten largest banks in the South, holding deposits of nearly twenty million dollars and having assets of nearly thirty million dollars. Three years after the first branch opened, a second branch was opened on Memphis' famous Beale Street. Union and Planters acquired the North Memphis Savings Bank the following year and converted its offices into a third branch.

=== Polk scandal and aftermath (1924 – 1929) ===
In 1924 Union and Planters experienced a major scandal involving an officer, Robert S. Polk. During the bank's decade of expansion, Polk stood out as a driving force. An orphan since he was 16, he came to the bank as a messenger in 1900 then rose through the ranks, his aggressive nature eventually catching the eye of Frank Hill. Polk became a vice president and oversaw bank operations during Hill's summer vacations in Cape Cod. Hill and Polk became business partners in a number of outside ventures financed by Union and Planters and seemed an unstoppable team. Then, Polk vanished in March 1924 with nearly $42,000 taken from a teller cage, replaced by Hill's endorsed markers. A teller reported to Hill that this was not the first time this had been done, and additional inquiries revealed that Polk had also diverted nearly $20,000 in Liberty Bond accounts for his own use. Several businessmen came forward with allegations that Polk had offered them loans from Union and Planters they would not have to repay, provided they turn over the loan proceeds to Polk. A day after his disappearance was reported in the local press, Polk wired Hill from El Paso, Texas that he would be returning soon and that there was no reason for concern. A grand jury was convened in the matter and planned to hear Polk's explanation upon his return. When he did arrive in Memphis, he was scheduled to appear the following morning to offer insight into what had happened the next morning. When he failed to appear as scheduled, authorities went to his residence. There they found Polk's body, his hand gripping the .38 revolver he used to kill himself.

Polk's suicide ruined Hill's credibility and forced him to retire from the bank. Frank Hayden took over as bank president after Union and Planters acquired Guaranty Bank and Trust Company, the company he formerly headed. Hayden inherited a bank in the midst of some serious problems. Polk had embezzled over $500,000 from the bank, not including the questionable loans for which he and Hill were responsible totaling about $8.1 million. Numerous customers claiming to have been defrauded by Polk demanded restitution. Hayden immediately wrote off more than $450,000 in loans, but more drastic action was required. In September 1924 Union and Planters engineered a reverse split, reducing its capital stock from $3.75 million to $1.87 million, and as a result cut shareholder equity in half. New shares were then issued and sold to boost the bank's capital to $2.5 million. Over the next four years Hayden was able to further shore up finances by collecting on bonds that covered some of Polk's theft, as well as successfully fending off lawsuits alleging the bank's responsibility for Polk's fraudulent actions. In the summer of 1928, however, Union and Planters again faced difficult circumstances when its account holders panicked and a bank run occurred. In order to shore up its finances, the bank sought a merger partner, resulting in an association with Rogers Caldwell, a Nashville investment banker. In 1917 at the age of 27, he began building an empire, as well as a reputation as a financial genius. Within ten years, riding the bull market of the 1920s, he controlled a network of fifty companies valued at over five hundred million dollars. In 1928 he and his associate, former U.S. Senator Luke Lea, bought a fifty-one percent stake in Manhattan Savings Bank and Trust Company in Memphis and agreed to merge with Union and Planters. The parties developed a massive reorganization plan, raising new funds to transform Union and Planters into a national bank. Upon completion of the conversion in the spring of 1929 the bank changed its name to Union Planters National Bank and Trust Company.

=== Later existence (1929 – 1974) ===
In the early years of the Depression, Union Planters changed presidents three times before electing Vance J. Alexander, who remained president from 1933 to 1963. Although the bank survived the 1930s, it struggled until the economy was spurred by military spending during World War II. It opened several new branches, and Union Planters had eight total locations at the end of the 1940s. In the postwar housing boom, Union Planters issued numerous building loans and became aggressive in the area of installment lending, especially car loans. Deposits also expanded at a rapid pace, growing from $93 million in 1941 to more than $250 million in 1948. Under Alexander's leadership, Union Planters followed a consistent strategy: open new branches and focus on retail banking and correspondent banking with rural institutions. By 1961, Union Planters operated thirteen branches and boasted deposits of $400 million. As authority passed to Alexander's successor, the new CEO, John E. Brown, the bank began to slip during the 1960s. With a decrease in correspondent banking, Union Planters overbuilt its branch system to make up the difference. In addition, Brown's managerial style caused problems at the bank. He was reluctant to delegate authority, pay his staff competitive wages, or even invest in office equipment. In order to use the photocopier, for example, bank lawyers had to produce a permission slip signed by Brown himself. The result was a demoralized staff and the exodus of key executives. In 1967 Brown was replaced by C. Bennett Harrison, who struggled for the next seven years addressing the bank's problems, only landing Union Planters in deeper trouble when in the 1970s higher interest rates turned many high-risk loans into money-losing propositions. In 1971, Union Planters Corporation was formed as a holding company for the bank's operations.

=== Final years (1974 – 2004) ===
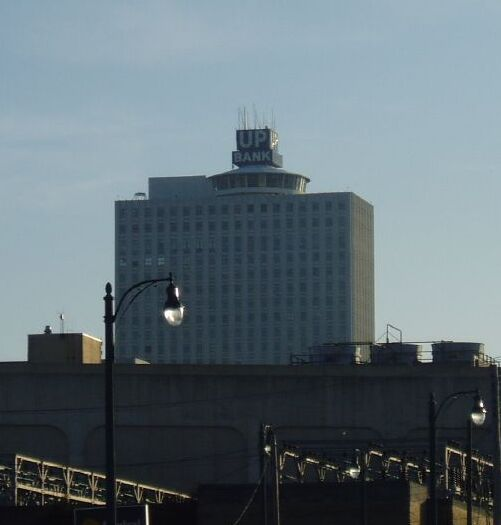
The "U-P Bank" sign atop 100 North Main in Memphis shortly after the sale to Regions.

To save Union Planters from impending disaster, William M. Matthews, Jr., was brought in as the bank's new president, replacing Harrison in 1974, but the extent of the bank's difficulties proved far greater than expected. Several officers of the bank, including Executive Vice-president Jesse Barr, had defrauded the bank. Barr and several officers were convicted of criminal charges and sent to prison. To his credit, Matthews openly addressed all problems of the bank with the press. At the same time, he took steps to revitalize the bank, closing unproductive branches and cutting staff while raising salaries to redress the long-term problem of low pay. He also invested heavily in technology. Union Planters, which a decade earlier owned but a single electric typewriter, now became the most technologically advanced bank in the region, allowing it to operate with significantly fewer employees. Furthermore, Matthews all but eliminated commercial lending, preferring instead to focus on investment banking and fee-based products and services. Although he returned the bank to profitability and repaired its tarnished image, after ten years of his leadership Union Planters was at best a lackluster performer.

Matthews was asked to resign as CEO in 1984 and his replacement, Benjamin W. Rawlins, Jr. immediately vowed to return Union Planters to traditional banking services. Within two years the bank showed enough improvement to explore future growth opportunities. The bank began initiating a plan to acquire community banks and by the end of the decade, this acquisition strategy evolved into what bank officials deemed the "Delta Strategy." The Delta Strategy called for the purchase of community banks within 150 miles of Memphis and urban or suburban banks within 300 miles. Union Planters suffered a setback in the late 1980s when a number of bad real estate loans, coupled with losses from a broker-dealer unit, resulted in a $22 million loss in 1989. But Rawlins was able to improve the balance sheet over the next several quarters and renew Union Planters' acquisition strategy. The pace was especially aggressive in 1993, a year Union Planters picked up thirteen banks and adding some $1.5 billion to its assets. By this time, Union Planters attracted the attention of Wall Street, as rumors spread over the next few years that it was either fattening itself up for the market or that a larger player in the consolidating world of banking would find it a desirable addition. None of the takeover rumors panned out, however, and Union Planters continued to buy up smaller banks. In 1998, the $2.3 billion acquisition of Magna Group of St. Louis bolstered Union Planters' position in Missouri and expanded the bank into Iowa and Illinois.

In September, 2000, Rawlins suffered a heart attack while on his treadmill jogging and died. During the 16 years he headed Union Planters, the bank grew from $2 billion to $34 billion in assets, operating 800 branches in twelve states, and became one of the thirty largest banks in the country. Rawlins was replaced as chief executive by bank president Jackson W. Moore, a lawyer who joined Union Planters in 1989. Within months of taking over, he initiated an effort to cut costs and improve profitability during a period of falling interest rates. The bank closed or sold less productive branches, outsourced some back-office functions, and eliminated jobs. Moreover, it only acquired one bank, St. Louis-based Jefferson Savings Bancorp, in February 2001. The addition was also in keeping with another key strategy of Moore's: shifting the focus away from rural community banks to the core urban markets of Memphis, Nashville, Indianapolis, St. Louis, and Miami.

=== Acquisition and merger (2004) ===
In 2004, Regions Financial Corporation of Birmingham, Alabama entered merger negotiations with Union Planters Bank. Regions was the surviving company in the resulting $5.9 billion transaction, with over 1,400 branches throughout the South and Midwest. Union Planters and Regions were given an equal number of seats on the board of directors. According to the Federal Reserve Order Approving the Merger, Union Planters Bank was the thirty-ninth largest bank in the United States, having total consolidated assets of $31.5 billion and controlling deposits of $22.8 billion. Upon completion of the merger, Regions became the nation's 21st largest bank. The merged company used Union Planters' old logo of a young cotton plant.

== See also ==
- Regions Financial Corporation
- Jackson W. Moore
- AmSouth Bancorporation
