= Chilton County, Alabama =

County in Alabama, United States

- County
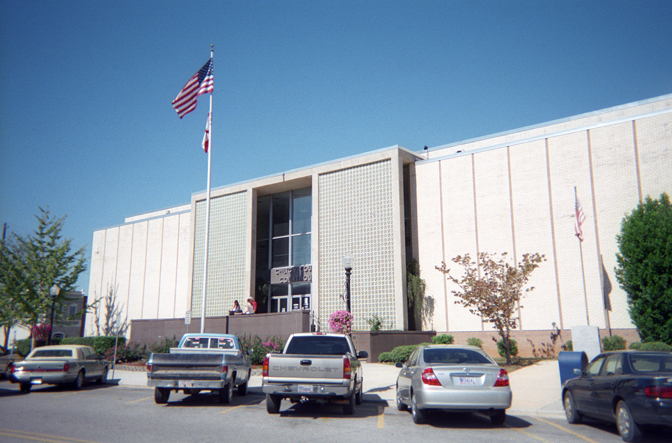
- Chilton County Courthouse in Clanton

- Seal Logo

- Location within the U.S. state of Alabama
- Coordinates: 32°50′43″N 86°42′52″W
- Country: United States
- State: Alabama
- Founded: December 30, 1868
- Named for: William Parish Chilton, Sr.
- Seat: Clanton
- Largest city: Clanton

Area
  - Total: 701 sq mi (1,820 km^{2})
  - Land: 693 sq mi (1,790 km^{2})
  - Water: 7.9 sq mi (20 km^{2}) 1.1%

Population (2020)
  - Total: 45,014
  - Estimate (2025): 47,708 ▲
  - Density: 65.0/sq mi (25.1/km^{2})
- Time zone: UTC−6 (Central)
  - Summer (DST): UTC−5 (CDT)
- Congressional district: 6th
- Website: chiltoncounty.org
- County Number 14 on Alabama Licence Plates

Chilton County is a county located in the central portion of the U.S. state of Alabama. As of the 2020 census, the population was 45,014. The county seat is Clanton. Its name is in honor of William Parish Chilton, Sr. (1810–1871), a lawyer who became Chief Justice of the Alabama Supreme Court and later represented Montgomery County in the Congress of the Confederate States of America.

Chilton County is included in the Birmingham, Alabama, metropolitan area. In 2010, the center of population of Alabama was located in Chilton County, near the city of Jemison, an area known as Jemison Division.

The county is known for its peaches and its unique landscape. It is home to swamps, prairies, the foothills of the Appalachians (which end in the county), and the Coosa River.

== History ==
Baker County was established on December 30, 1868, named for Alfred Baker, with its county seat at Grantville. The county was created from Autauga, Bibb, Perry and Shelby County.

Residents of the county petitioned the Alabama legislature for the renaming of their county. On December 17, 1874, the petitioners accepted the suggestion of Chilton County, even though the Chief Justice had not lived within its boundaries. In 1871, the county seat was moved to what is now Clanton after the Grantville courthouse burned. Clanton, which was a site along the Louisville and Nashville Railroad when chosen the county seat, was named for James H. Clanton, Confederate Brigadier General.

In 1942, the U.S. Navy commissioned a new vessel, the USS Chilton, in honor of Chilton County.

== Geography ==
According to the United States Census Bureau, the county has a total area of 701 square miles (1,820 km^{2}), of which 693 square miles (1,790 km^{2}) is land and 7.9 square miles (20 km^{2}) (1.1%) is water.

=== Major highways ===
- Interstate 65
- U.S. Highway 31 / State Route 3 (unsigned)
- U.S. Highway 82 / State Route 6 (unsigned)
- State Route 22
- State Route 139
- State Route 143
- State Route 145
- State Route 155
- State Route 183
- State Route 191

=== Adjacent counties ===
- Shelby County (north)
- Coosa County (east)
- Elmore County (southeast)
- Autauga County (south)
- Perry County (southwest)
- Dallas County (southwest)
- Bibb County (northwest)

=== National protected area ===
- Talladega National Forest (part)

== Demographics ==
Historical population
Census	Pop.	Note	%±
1870	6,194		—
1880	10,793		74.2%
1890	14,549		34.8%
1900	16,522		13.6%
1910	23,187		40.3%
1920	22,770		−1.8%
1930	24,579		7.9%
1940	27,955		13.7%
1950	26,922		−3.7%
1960	25,693		−4.6%
1970	25,180		−2.0%
1980	30,612		21.6%
1990	32,458		6.0%
2000	39,593		22.0%
2010	43,643		10.2%
2020	45,014		3.1%
2025 (est.)	47,708	▲	6.0%
U.S. Decennial Census; 1790–1960 1900–1990; 1990–2000 2010–2020

=== 2020 census ===
As of the 2020 census, the county had a population of 45,014. The median age was 40.1 years. 23.6% of residents were under the age of 18 and 17.1% of residents were 65 years of age or older. For every 100 females there were 95.6 males, and for every 100 females age 18 and over there were 94.5 males age 18 and over.

The racial makeup of the county was 78.9% White, 9.0% Black or African American, 0.8% American Indian and Alaska Native, 0.4% Asian, 0.0% Native Hawaiian and Pacific Islander, 6.4% from some other race, and 4.4% from two or more races. Hispanic or Latino residents of any race comprised 9.8% of the population.

14.5% of residents lived in urban areas, while 85.5% lived in rural areas.

There were 17,302 households in the county, of which 33.3% had children under the age of 18 living with them and 26.0% had a female householder with no spouse or partner present. About 25.5% of all households were made up of individuals and 11.6% had someone living alone who was 65 years of age or older.

There were 19,438 housing units, of which 11.0% were vacant. Among occupied housing units, 76.5% were owner-occupied and 23.5% were renter-occupied. The homeowner vacancy rate was 1.3% and the rental vacancy rate was 8.1%.

=== Racial and ethnic composition ===
Chilton County, Alabama – Racial and ethnic composition Note: the US Census treats Hispanic/Latino as an ethnic category. This table excludes Latinos from the racial categories and assigns them to a separate category. Hispanics/Latinos may be of any race.
Race / Ethnicity (NH = Non-Hispanic)	Pop 2000	Pop 2010	Pop 2020	% 2000	% 2010	% 2020
White alone (NH)	33,897	35,395	34,878	85.61%	81.10%	77.48%
Black or African American alone (NH)	4,131	4,171	4,040	10.43%	9.56%	8.97%
Native American or Alaska Native alone (NH)	111	134	112	0.28%	0.31%	0.25%
Asian alone (NH)	65	125	176	0.16%	0.29%	0.39%
Pacific Islander alone (NH)	2	11	5	0.01%	0.03%	0.01%
Other race alone (NH)	16	34	121	0.04%	0.08%	0.27%
Mixed race or Multiracial (NH)	219	353	1,264	0.55%	0.81%	2.81%
Hispanic or Latino (any race)	1,152	3,420	4,418	2.91%	7.84%	9.81%
Total	39,593	43,643	45,014	100.00%	100.00%	100.00%

=== 2010 census ===
According to the 2010 United States census, the population identifies by the following ethnicities:

- 84.1% White
- 9.7% Black
- 0.4% Native American
- 0.3% Asian
- 0.0% Native Hawaiian or Pacific Islander
- 1.2% Two or more races
- 7.8% Hispanic or Latino (of any race)

Chilton County is the 23rd-richest county per capita income in Alabama.

=== 2000 census ===
As of the census, of 2000, there were 39,593 people, 15,287 households, and 11,342 families residing in the county. The population density was 57 people per square mile (22 people/km^{2}). There were 17,651 housing units at an average density of 25 units per square mile (9.7 units/km^{2}). The racial makeup of the county was 86.71% White, 10.61% Black or African American, 0.28% Native American, 0.18% Asian, 0.02% Pacific Islander, 1.51% from other races, and 0.69% from two or more races. Nearly 2.91% of the population were Hispanic or Latino of any race.

There were 15,287 households, of which 34.40% had children under the age of 18 living with them, 60.10% were married couples living together, 10.50% had a female householder with no husband present, and 25.80% were non-families. Nearly 22.90% of all households were made up of individuals, and 10.20% had someone living alone who was 65 years of age or older. The average household size was 2.57, and the average family size was 3.00.

25.70% of the population were under the age of 18, 9.10% from 18 to 24, 29.00% from 25 to 44, 23.40% from 45 to 64, and 12.90% who were 65 years of age or older. The median age was 36 years. For every 100 females, there were 97.80 males. For every 100 females age 18 and over, there were 93.90 males.

The median household income was $32,588 and the median family income was $39,505. Males had a median income of $31,006 versus $21,275 for females. The per capita income for the county was $15,303. About 12.60% of families and 15.70% of the population were below the poverty line, including 19.40% of those under age 18 and 18.20% of those age 65 or over.

== Education ==
Chilton County contains one public school district. There are approximately 7,700 students in public PK-12 schools in Chilton County.

=== Districts ===
School districts include:

- Chilton County School District

== Government ==
The County Commission is made up of seven members elected by cumulative vote (CV). "Chilton County adopted cumulative voting in 1988 as part of the settlement of a vote dilution lawsuit brought against its previous election system. According to the 1990 Census, African Americans constituted 9.9% of the county's voting age population." Although passage of the Voting Rights Act of 1965 enabled African Americans to register and vote, in Chilton County no African American was elected to the County Commission until the first cumulative voting election, held in 1988.

African Americans in Alabama had been essentially disenfranchised by the 1901 state constitution, which required payment of a poll tax and qualification by a literacy test in order to register to vote. Discriminatory in practice as administered by white officials, this system excluded most blacks from the state's political system for decades in the 20th century before Congress passed the Voting Rights Act of 1965. After that, African Americans were able finally to register and vote in the county and state for the first time since the late 19th century.

In counties in which there is a minority population and members are elected at-large or by single-member districts, minorities may be unable to elect representatives in a system dominated by the majority. The adoption of cumulative voting in Chilton County has enabled the minority to elect candidates of their choice by pooling their votes. Bobby Agee was elected as a Chilton County Commissioner in 1988 and again in the second cumulative voting election in 1992. Cumulative voting depends on a multi-seat election, whether at-large or by district. "The cumulative options provide a minority of voters an opportunity to concentrate their support for a candidate or candidates more effectively than they can under the more traditional voting rules used in this country." In 2014, the county commission had an African-American commissioner among its seven members. However, in 2018, the county commissioners were all white males.

The commission hires a County Administrator to handle daily management of county business.

Chilton County is reliably Republican at the presidential level. The last Democrat to win the county in a presidential election is Jimmy Carter, who won it by a majority in 1976.

United States presidential election results for Chilton County, Alabama
Year	Republican		Democratic		Third party(ies)	
Year	No.	%	No.	%	No.	%
1868	283	29.51%	676	70.49%	0	0.00%
1872	237	33.29%	475	66.71%	0	0.00%
1876	151	17.18%	728	82.82%	0	0.00%
1880	131	15.52%	713	84.48%	0	0.00%
1884	295	25.97%	841	74.03%	0	0.00%
1888	437	28.41%	1,101	71.59%	0	0.00%
1892	121	7.24%	648	38.78%	902	53.98%
1896	310	20.46%	1,131	74.65%	74	4.88%
1900	791	60.29%	469	35.75%	52	3.96%
1904	648	39.11%	738	44.54%	271	16.35%
1908	890	54.87%	656	40.44%	76	4.69%
1912	140	6.23%	880	39.18%	1,226	54.59%
1916	1,363	59.31%	881	38.34%	54	2.35%
1920	2,273	69.11%	962	29.25%	54	1.64%
1924	1,595	63.19%	848	33.60%	81	3.21%
1928	3,186	69.37%	1,402	30.52%	5	0.11%
1932	1,532	47.09%	1,664	51.15%	57	1.75%
1936	1,469	36.23%	2,565	63.26%	21	0.52%
1940	1,995	41.99%	2,746	57.80%	10	0.21%
1944	1,385	41.02%	1,984	58.77%	7	0.21%
1948	1,584	44.38%	0	0.00%	1,985	55.62%
1952	2,563	52.91%	2,269	46.84%	12	0.25%
1956	3,139	60.98%	1,891	36.73%	118	2.29%
1960	3,201	63.93%	1,798	35.91%	8	0.16%
1964	5,202	75.97%	0	0.00%	1,645	24.03%
1968	1,602	18.00%	566	6.36%	6,734	75.65%
1972	7,349	82.88%	1,356	15.29%	162	1.83%
1976	4,725	45.50%	5,550	53.44%	110	1.06%
1980	6,615	57.64%	4,706	41.00%	156	1.36%
1984	8,243	70.53%	2,934	25.10%	511	4.37%
1988	8,761	69.41%	3,820	30.26%	42	0.33%
1992	8,126	56.17%	4,946	34.19%	1,396	9.65%
1996	7,910	55.40%	5,354	37.50%	1,014	7.10%
2000	10,066	66.70%	4,806	31.84%	220	1.46%
2004	12,829	76.85%	3,778	22.63%	86	0.52%
2008	13,960	78.49%	3,674	20.66%	151	0.85%
2012	13,932	79.68%	3,397	19.43%	156	0.89%
2016	15,081	82.10%	2,911	15.85%	377	2.05%
2020	16,085	83.30%	3,073	15.91%	152	0.79%
2024	16,920	85.61%	2,698	13.65%	145	0.73%

United States Senate election results for Chilton County, Alabama2
Year	Republican		Democratic		Third party(ies)	
Year	No.	%	No.	%	No.	%
2020	15,708	81.69%	3,499	18.20%	22	0.11%

United States Senate election results for Chilton County, Alabama3
Year	Republican		Democratic		Third party(ies)	
Year	No.	%	No.	%	No.	%
2022	10,386	85.38%	1,407	11.57%	371	3.05%

Alabama Gubernatorial election results for Chilton County
Year	Republican		Democratic		Third party(ies)	
Year	No.	%	No.	%	No.	%
2022	10,541	86.28%	1,268	10.38%	408	3.34%

== Communities ==
=== Cities ===
- Clanton (county seat)
- Jemison
- Calera (Mostly in Shelby County)

=== Towns ===
- Maplesville
- Thorsby

=== Unincorporated communities ===
- Isabella
- Jumbo
- Mountain Creek
- Mulberry
- Pletcher
- Stanton
- Verbena

== Notable people ==
Billy Wayne Fulmer - ALEA SBI Chief / 2025 Billy Boody Bowl QB

== See also ==
- National Register of Historic Places listings in Chilton County, Alabama
- Properties on the Alabama Register of Landmarks and Heritage in Chilton County, Alabama
- List of counties in Alabama
