= Justin Tuck =

American football player (born 1983)

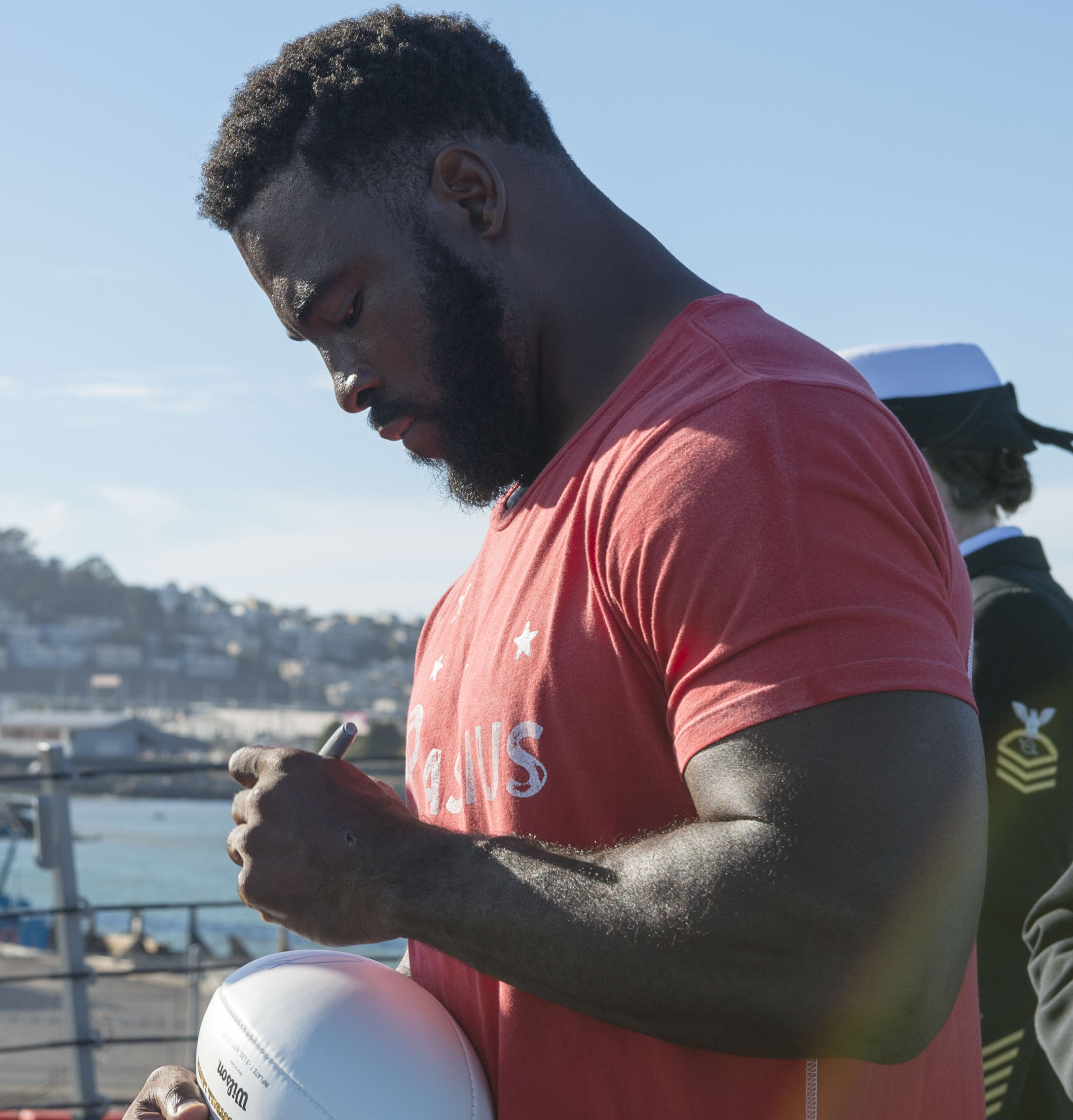
- Tuck signing a football in 2015

No. 91
- Position: Defensive end

Personal information
- Born: March 29, 1983 (age 43); Kellyton, Alabama, U.S.
- Listed height: 6 ft 5 in (1.96 m)
- Listed weight: 265 lb (120 kg)

Career information
- High school: Central Coosa County (Rockford, Alabama)
- College: Notre Dame (2001–2004)
- NFL draft: 2005: 3rd round, 74th overall pick

Career history
- New York Giants (2005–2013); Oakland Raiders (2014–2015)

Awards and highlights
- 2× Super Bowl champion (XLII, XLVI); First-team All-Pro (2008); Second-team All-Pro (2010); 2× Pro Bowl (2008, 2010); New York Giants Ring of Honor; 30th greatest New York Giant of all-time

Career NFL statistics
- Total tackles: 510
- Sacks: 66.5
- Forced fumbles: 22
- Fumble recoveries: 6
- Interceptions: 3
- Defensive touchdowns: 1
- Stats at Pro Football Reference

Justin Lee Tuck (born March 29, 1983) is an American financier and former professional football player who was a defensive end in the National Football League (NFL). He played college football at Notre Dame, and was selected by the New York Giants in the third round of the 2005 NFL draft, winning two Super Bowl titles with the team. He also played for the Oakland Raiders. Tuck graduated from the University of Pennsylvania's Wharton School with an MBA in 2018, and was employed by Goldman Sachs.

== Early life ==
Tuck played high school football in Alabama at Central Coosa County. Growing up, Tuck's favorite sport was basketball. Although he began playing football in the seventh grade, Justin only began to take it seriously in his freshman year of high school where he originally started out as a quarterback before changing positions to tight end and defensive end. His accolades include earning Alabama Class 4A Player of the Year as a senior in 2000, as well as lettering in football at both linebacker and tight end. For his career at Central-Coosa, Tuck recorded 492 tackles with 37 sacks, 26 forced fumbles, and 17 fumble recoveries. As a tight end, Tuck had 115 catches for 2,106 yards and 17 touchdowns. Subsequently, Tuck also won two state championships as a member of the high school basketball team.

== College career ==
Tuck received an athletic scholarship to attend the University of Notre Dame, where he played for the Notre Dame Fighting Irish football team from 2001 to 2004. After redshirting his 2001 freshman year, Tuck played sparingly in his sophomore season. Playing only 180 minutes for the season, Tuck recorded his first collegiate sack against Michigan State. Despite his limited playing time and one start against Rutgers, Tuck was named a third-team freshman All-American by The Sporting News. Tuck increased his production in his final two seasons at Notre Dame. In 2003, he finished the season with 13.5 sacks before suffering a knee injury against Syracuse. Tuck frequently encountered double-team coverage in 2004. Despite a lingering knee problem from the previous season and not playing in Notre Dame's Insight.com Bowl loss to Oregon State, Tuck still finished the season with 47 tackles, six sacks and 14 stops for losses.

Nicknamed The Freak by his teammates for his raw athleticism, Tuck holds several defensive records at Notre Dame. Topping the previous record mark of 22.5 sacks by Kory Minor, Tuck finished his collegiate career with 24.5 sacks. His career 43 tackles for loss and 13.5 sacks in a single season are also school records. He graduated from Notre Dame in May 2005 with a degree in management from the Mendoza College of Business.

== Professional career ==
=== Pre-draft ===
Pre-draft measurables
Height	Weight	Arm length	Hand span	40-yard dash	20-yard shuttle	Three-cone drill	Vertical jump	Broad jump	Bench press	Wonderlic
6 ft 4 1/2 in (1.94 m)	256 lb (116 kg)	33 in (0.84 m)	9 5/8 in (0.24 m)	4.62 s	4.29 s	7.33 s	37 1/2 in (0.95 m)	9 ft 10 in (3.00 m)	24 reps	29
Height, weight, and Wonderlic from NFL Combine; all others from Notre Dame Pro Day.

In the run-up to the 2005 NFL draft, Tuck also recorded a wind-aided 4.56 in the 40-yard dash as well as a 380-pound bench press, 560-pound squat, and a 336-pound power clean. Pre-draft reports contended that the knee injury would keep teams from taking Tuck in the first round. He was known as "terrific athlete who is a disruptive force up the field. Breaks down well playing with leverage, rarely off his feet and tough to move from his angle of attack," and "an extremely quick and agile player who possesses very good strength for a player of his size".

=== New York Giants ===
Every defensive end who is going to be picked in the first round is going to be a good pick for whoever they're chosen by, but if I had to tell you what sets me apart, that would be my desire and determination to get better. I know what I need to work on, I know my weaknesses, but I have that work ethic to improve every day. I have that want to be the best player at my position, and I have the belief in myself that one day that will come true.

— Justin Tuck, 2005

==== 2005 season ====
Although projected to be a mid-first round pick in the 2005 NFL draft, Tuck was selected in the third round, 74th overall, by the New York Giants. On July 29, 2005, Tuck signed a four-year $2.36 million contract with the Giants, which included a $737,000 signing bonus.

Tuck's rookie season in the NFL found him behind Pro Bowl defensive ends Michael Strahan and Osi Umenyiora on the New York Giants depth chart, reducing his role to special teams and the first backup at each defensive end position. In total, Tuck played in 14 regular season games with one start and the NFC Wild Card Round. His first career sack came against the Giants' NFC East rival, the Dallas Cowboys, in Week 13.

Tuck finished his rookie season with 33 total tackles, one sack, two passes defended, one forced fumble, and 18 special teams tackles.

==== 2006 season ====
During his sophomore season in 2006, Tuck was limited to just six games due to an injury suffered on October 23, 2006, in a New York Giants Monday Night Football victory over the Dallas Cowboys. On November 17, Tuck underwent successful surgery to repair a Lisfranc injury. The procedure included inserting screws into Tuck's foot. For the 2006 season, Tuck recorded two solo tackles in six games.

==== 2007 season ====
Despite starting only two games in the 2007 season, Tuck enjoyed his best season to that point, recording 65 tackles, 10 sacks, and two forced fumbles during the regular season. During the season, Tuck spelled both Michael Strahan and Osi Umenyiora at defensive end and on likely passing downs he teamed with Mathias Kiwanuka at defensive tackle (with Strahan and Umenyiora at end) to form a four defensive end pass rush, a scheme defensive coordinator Steve Spagnuolo employed to pressure opponent quarterbacks. On January 18, 2008, Tuck signed a contract extension from the Giants. The five-year, $30 million deal, $16 million of which was guaranteed, included a $9 million signing bonus.

==== Super Bowl XLII ====
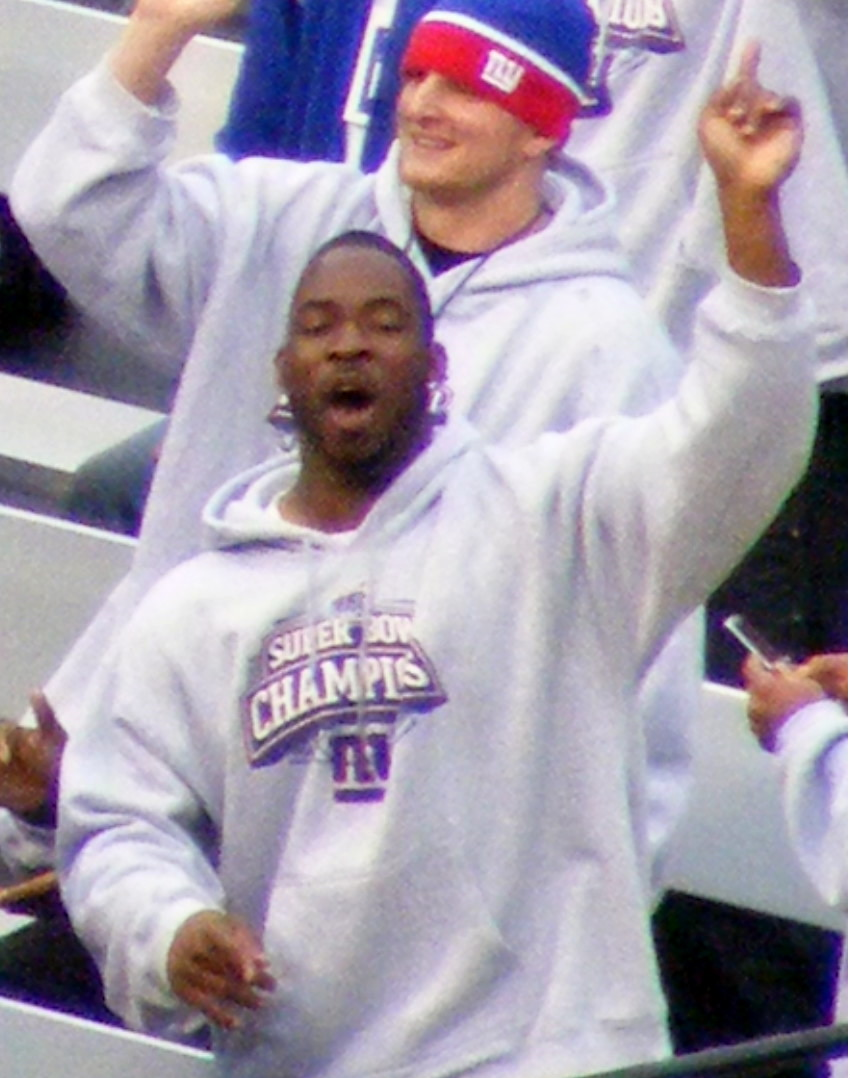
Justin Tuck at the Giants' Super Bowl XLII champions rally

In front of a record-setting American television audience, Tuck played well in Super Bowl XLII. According to Tuck, he and New England Patriots quarterback Tom Brady exchanged playful trash talk, during especially physical plays. Due to the game's low score, opinions were heavily waged that Tuck was more deserving of the MVP award than quarterback Eli Manning.

==== 2008 season ====
On January 17, 2008, Tuck was rewarded with a contract extension with the Giants. On March 31, 2008, Tuck reported to voluntary off-season conditioning programs administered by the Giants. Prior to the start of Giants mini-camp in May, Tuck and the Giants were invited by President George W. Bush to the White House to honor their victory in Super Bowl XLII. Tuck also took up boxing to improve his hand-eye coordination.

Tuck started his 2008 campaign by sacking quarterback Jason Campbell on the first play of the Giants' season opener, a 16–7 win over the Washington Redskins. Tuck followed his exceptional performance in week one with an outstanding performance against the St. Louis Rams. Tuck finished the game with 2.0 sacks and an interception return for a touchdown in a Giants victory in week two. The interception and touchdown marked the first of Tuck's professional career. The touchdown was his first since his junior season at Notre Dame.

Tuck totaled 66 tackles, 12 sacks, three forced fumbles, two passes deflected, and one interception. Tuck's stellar play in the 2008 season earned him a trip to the Pro Bowl as one of the NFC's starting defensive ends. He was also voted All-Pro for the first time in his career.

==== 2009 season ====
Tuck and the Giants entered the 2009 season as one of the favorites for the NFC to go the Super Bowl. With the return of teammate Osi Umenyiora, Tuck hoped to see fewer double teams than he did during the end of the 2008 season.

Tuck played very well in the season opener against the Washington Redskins on September 13, 2009. Tuck recorded two tackles for a loss, 1.5 sacks, and a pass deflection, helping the Giants win by a score of 23–17. After the game, Tuck was named NFC Defensive Player of the Week. Tuck sustained an injured left shoulder when he was tripped by a Cowboys' lineman Flozell Adams in September, which affected his play for the rest of the 2009 season. He ended the season with 60 tackles, six sacks, six forced fumbles, and eight pass deflections.

==== 2010 season ====
Tuck continued to perform at a high level throughout the 2010 season and, along with Osi Umenyiora, proved why New York's pair of defensive ends were among the most feared in the league.

Tuck recorded career highs with 76 total tackles and six forced fumbles. In addition, he finished the season with 11.5 sacks, a half a sack shy of tying his career best 12 sacks from 2008. Tuck's greatest individual efforts came in games against the Chicago Bears and the Philadelphia Eagles. In Week 4, against Chicago, Tuck accounted for three of the defense's 10 total sacks, and had a forced fumble in a game the Giants won 17–3. In Week 15, against Philadelphia, Tuck had 1.5 sacks in a losing effort to the Eagles.

The Giants finished with a 10–6 record and missed the playoffs after losses to the Eagles, who won the NFC East, as well as the eventual Super Bowl Champion Green Bay Packers. He was named to the Pro Bowl. Tuck was ranked 60th by his fellow players in the NFL Top 100 Players of 2011.

==== 2011 season ====
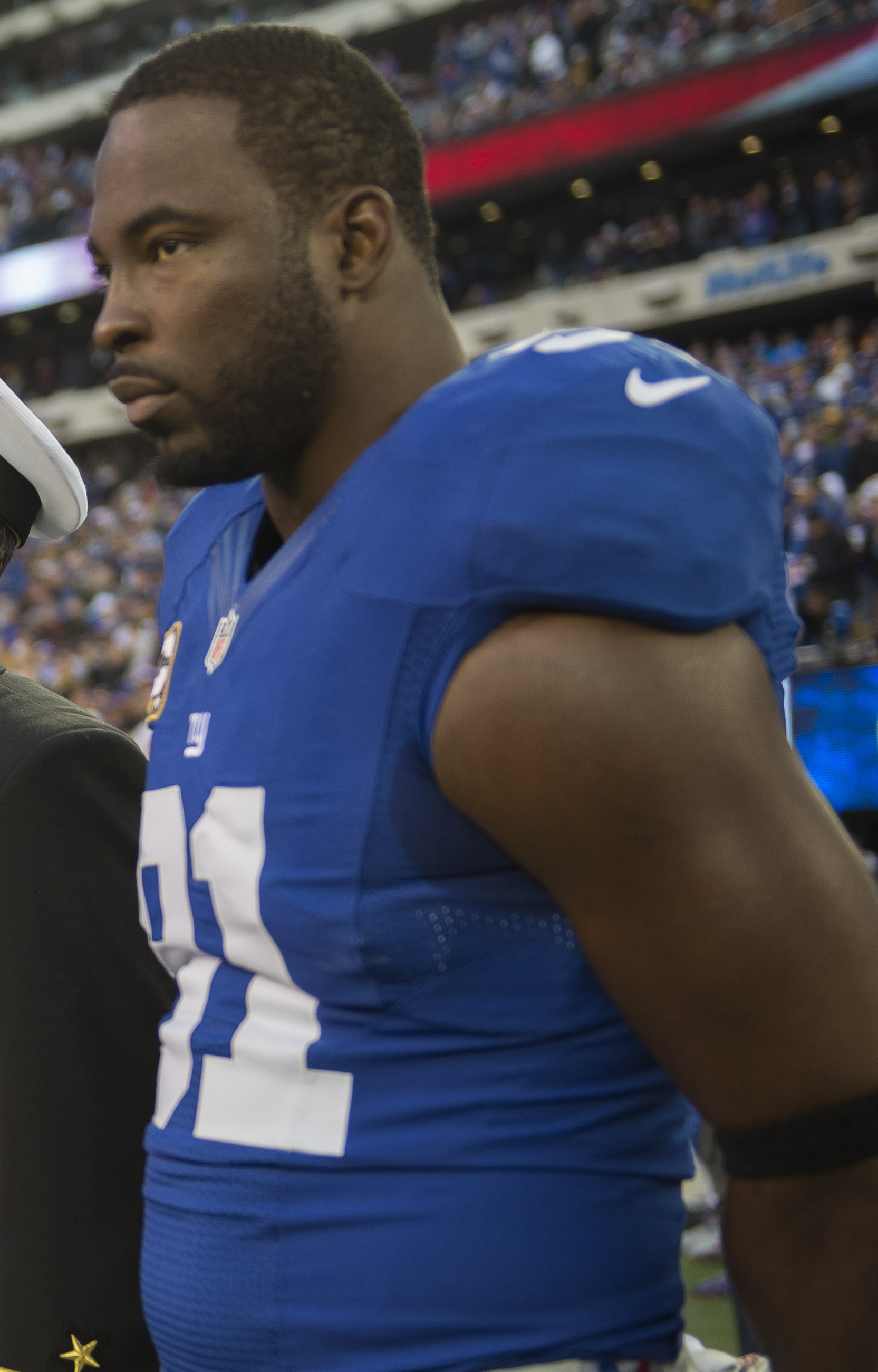
Tuck with the Giants in 2012

Tuck battled injuries in the 2011 season. He started in 11 games. He had 26 tackles and five sacks in the regular season. However, in the postseason he played in all four of the Giants games and had 3.5 sacks, two of which came in Super Bowl XLVI. The Giants went on to win Super Bowl XLVI over the New England Patriots. It was Tuck's second Super Bowl ring in five years. Many believed that Tuck was a primary candidate for Super Bowl MVP because of his performance in the game, but quarterback Eli Manning won the MVP just like in Super Bowl XLII. After the game, Tuck joked that Manning "stole my MVP again." Also, Tuck's multi-sack Super Bowl performance made him the first to ever have multiple multi-sack performances in the Super Bowl. He was ranked 62nd by his fellow players on the NFL Top 100 Players of 2012.

==== 2012 season ====
In the 2012 season, Tuck appeared in 15 games, of which he started 14. He finished with four sacks, 45 total tackles, and one pass defended.

==== 2013 season ====
In Week 13, Tuck earned NFC Defensive Player of the Week for his game against the Washington Redskins. He had four sacks in the 24–17 victory. In the 2013 season, Tuck appeared in 16 games, of which he started 15. He finished with 11 sacks, 63 total tackles, one interception, three passes defended, and two forced fumbles.

=== Oakland Raiders ===
==== 2014 season ====
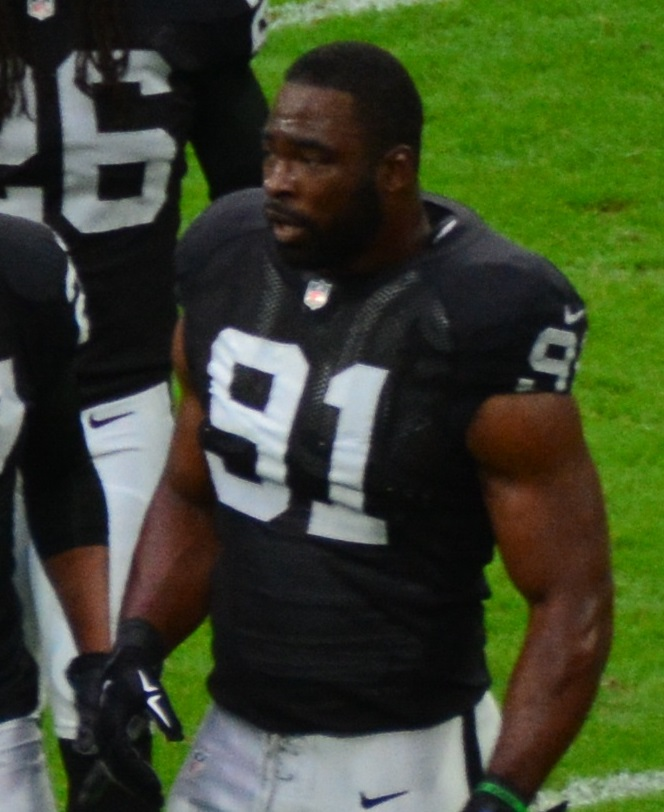
Tuck with the Oakland Raiders in 2014

On March 13, 2014, Tuck signed a two-year, $11 million contract with the Oakland Raiders. Tuck said he signed the deal because the deal that the New York Giants offered was "disrespectful". Tuck played in 15 games and recorded five sacks, 43 total tackles, one interception, three passes defended, and two forced fumbles in the 2014 season.

==== 2015 season ====
On October 15, 2015, Tuck was placed on the team's injured reserve due to a chest injury. He played in five games and recorded one sack, 14 total tackles, and three passes defended in the 2015 season.

==== Retirement ====
Tuck announced his retirement from professional football on February 1, 2016, after 11 seasons. On May 6, 2016, Tuck signed a one-day contract with New York to retire as a Giant.

== NFL career statistics ==
Legend
	Won the Super Bowl
**Bold**	Career high

Year	Team	Games		Tackles					Interceptions					Fumbles	
Year	Team	GP	GS	Cmb	Solo	Ast	Sck	Sfty	Int	Yds	Avg	Lng	TD	FF	FR
2005	NYG	14	1	31	26	5	1.0	0	—	—	—	—	—	1	1
2006	NYG	6	0	10	6	4	0.0	0	—	—	—	—	—	0	0
2007	NYG	**16**	2	65	48	17	10.0	0	—	—	—	—	—	2	0
2008	NYG	**16**	**16**	67	**52**	15	**12.0**	0	**1**	**41**	**41.0**	**41T**	**1**	3	0
2009	NYG	**16**	15	59	44	15	6.0	0	—	—	—	—	—	5	0
2010	NYG	**16**	**16**	**76**	48	**28**	11.5	0	—	—	—	—	—	**6**	**5**
2011	NYG	12	11	37	26	11	5.0	0	—	—	—	—	—	1	0
2012	NYG	15	14	45	27	18	4.0	0	—	—	—	—	—	0	0
2013	NYG	**16**	15	63	41	22	11.0	0	**1**	−2.0	−2.0	−2.0	0	2	0
2014	OAK	15	12	43	37	6	5.0	0	**1**	7	7.0	7	0	2	0
2015	OAK	5	5	14	7	7	1.0	0	—	—	—	—	—	0	0
Career		147	111	510	353	157	66.5	0	3	46	15.3	41	1	22	6

== Business and philanthropy career ==
After his retirement from football, Tuck worked at Goldman Sachs in wealth management.

== Personal life ==
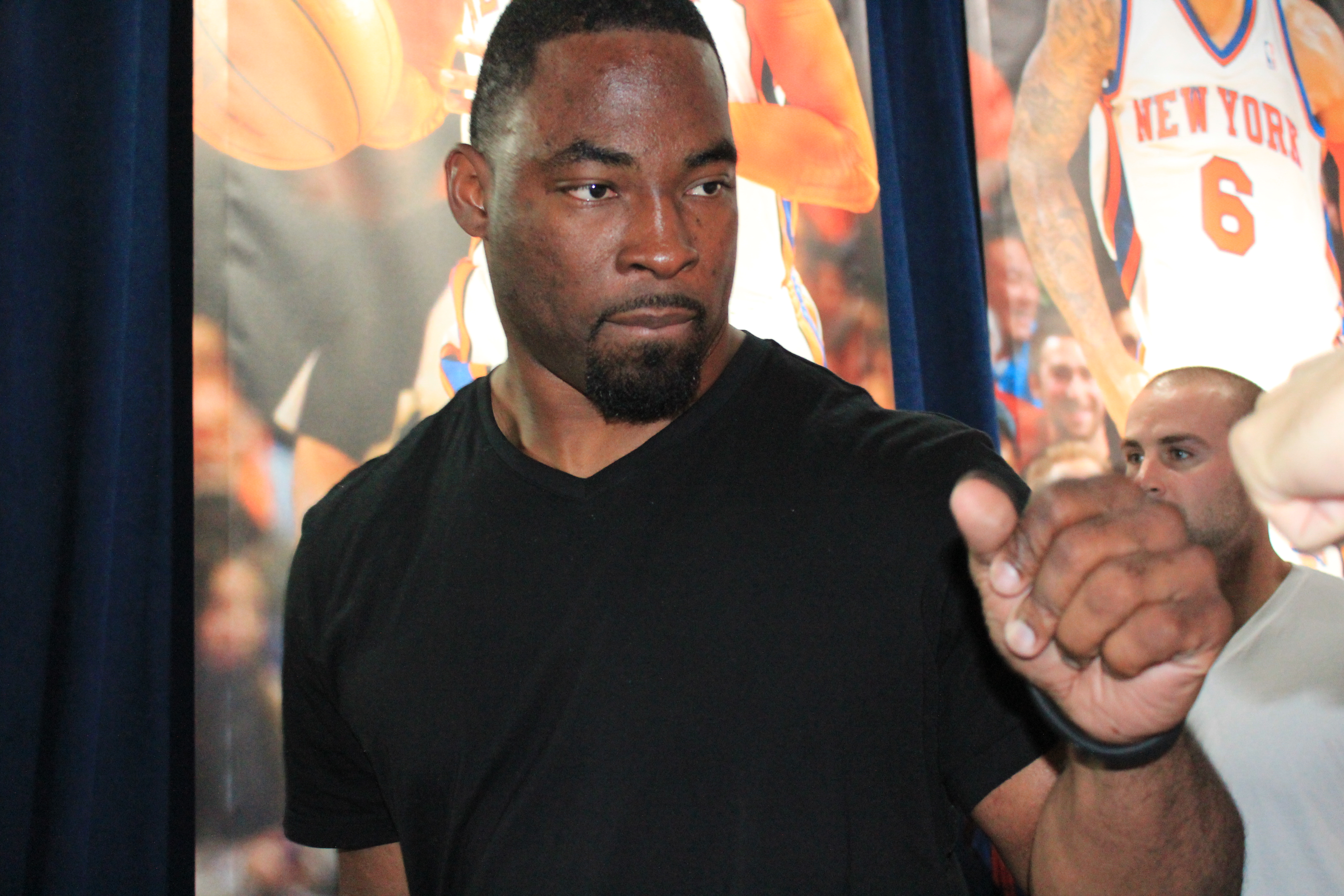
Justin Tuck at the New York Knicks basketball game against the Miami Heat (May 2012)

Tuck's parents are Jimmy Lee and Elaine Tuck.

Tuck is married to Lauran Williamson, who is from Bucks County, Pennsylvania. She graduated from Notre Dame's Mendoza College of Business in 2005. She played the defensive back position in women's intramural football and wrote for the student newspaper. She began dating Tuck during his junior year.

In 1973, Jimmy Lee Tuck, Justin's father, built – by hand – the home that has housed his wife and eight children.

During his childhood, Justin was nicknamed "He-Man" due to his large stature. He would run through his home yelling catchphrases from Masters of the Universe such as "By the power of Grayskull!" or "I have the power!". During his youth, Tuck frequently attended Elam II Missionary Baptist Church in his native Kellyton, resulting in Justin becoming the congregation's youngest Sunday School instructor. Justin is cousins with current Washington Commanders middle linebacker Bobby Wagner, as well as Adalius Thomas, former Baltimore Ravens and New England Patriots linebacker.

After the Giants won Super Bowl XLII, Tuck achieved a new level of celebrity in his native Alabama. "It was interesting when I went home (to Alabama)," Tuck said. "You couldn't go anywhere without people asking for your autograph or telling you congratulations or how proud they were of you and things like that." The community celebration was in honor of the Giants' Super Bowl XLII victory.

The following month, Tuck was again honored for his Super Bowl performance. He exchanged a game-worn football jersey for a game-used hockey stick with New York Rangers captain Jaromír Jágr. He is a Rangers fan.

Tuck has participated in various philanthropic causes. Tuck and Giants teammate Michael Strahan teamed up with Nike to design their own exclusive pair of sneakers for ID studio in New York City. All proceeds of the sneakers were donated to Nike's Let Me Play global campaign. Tuck was also featured on the second season of "Cake Boss" when he ordered a cake shaped like a billiards table for the first annual celebrity billiards event for his charity "Tuck's Rush for Literacy."

Tuck and his family have been residents of Fort Lee, New Jersey.

He also served on the player engagement board of advisors of the Alliance of American Football in 2018.

In May 2018, Tuck graduated from The Wharton School at the University of Pennsylvania with a Master of Business Administration in management.
