= Alabama State Route 139 =

State highway in Alabama, United States

State Route 139

Route information
- Maintained by ALDOT
- Length: 19.856 mi (31.955 km)

Major junctions
- South end: SR 22 in Maplesville
- North end: SR 25 southwest of Wilton

Location
- Country: United States
- State: Alabama
- Counties: Chilton, Bibb, Shelby

Highway system
- Alabama State Highway System; Interstate; US; State
← SR 137	→ SR 140

State Route 139 (SR 139) is a 19.856-mile (31.955 km) state highway that serves as a north–south connection between Maplesville and the Montevallo area. It travels through parts of Chilton, Bibb, and Shelby counties. The southern terminus is an intersection with SR 22 in Maplesville, and its northern terminus is at an intersection with SR 25 southwest of Wilton.

== Route description ==
SR 139 begins at an intersection with SR 22 in Maplesville. From this point, it follows a generally northerly course through Bibb County, and travels through Randolph and Brierfield, en route to its northern terminus, an intersection with SR 25 southwest of Wilton in Shelby County.

== Major intersections ==
County	Location	mi	km	Destinations	Notes
Chilton	Maplesville	0.0	0.0	SR 22 – Stanton, Clanton	Southern terminus
Bibb	No major junctions				
Shelby	Montevallo	19.856	31.955	SR 25 – Brierfield State Park	Northern terminus
1.000 mi = 1.609 km; 1.000 km = 0.621 mi
