= Alabama State Route 259 =

State highway in Alabama, United States

State Route 259

Route information
- Maintained by ALDOT
- Length: 12.848 mi (20.677 km)

Major junctions
- South end: SR 9 in Equality
- North end: SR 22 near Alexander City

Location
- Country: United States
- State: Alabama
- Counties: Coosa, Tallapoosa

Highway system
- Alabama State Highway System; Interstate; US; State
← SR 257	→ SR 261

State Route 259 (SR 259) is an approximately 12.8-mile-long (20.6 km) route serving as a connection between SR 9 at Equality with SR 22 in southwest Alexander City.

== Route description ==
The southern terminus of the route is at its intersection with SR 9 in Equality. From this point, the route take a northeasterly course to its northern terminus located at SR 22 in southwest Alexander City.

== Major intersections ==
County	Location	mi	km	Destinations	Notes
Coosa	Equality	0.000	0.000	SR 9 – Wetumpka, Kellyton	Southern terminus
Tallapoosa		12.848	20.677	SR 22 – Rockford, Alexander City	Northern terminus
1.000 mi = 1.609 km; 1.000 km = 0.621 mi
