= Alabama State Route 22 =

State highway in Alabama, United States

State Route 22

Route information
- Maintained by ALDOT
- Length: 168.543 mi (271.244 km)

Major junctions
- West end: SR 5 in Safford
- US 80 / SR 14 in Selma; US 82 in Maplesville; I-65 in Clanton; US 231 / SR 21 in Rockford; US 280 in Alexander City; US 431 in Roanoke
- East end: SR 34 at the Georgia state line near Roanoke

Location
- Country: United States
- State: Alabama
- Counties: Dallas, Chilton, Coosa, Tallapoosa, Chambers, Randolph

Highway system
- Alabama State Highway System; Interstate; US; State
| ← I-22 | → SR 23 |

State Route 22 (SR 22) is a 168.5-mile (271.2 km) state highway that extends from Safford in Dallas County to the Georgia state line near Roanoke in Randolph County. The route travels across most of the state from west to east.

== Route description ==
Starting at an intersection with SR 5 in Safford, the route travels northeast through Selma and Maplesville. At Clanton the highway is concurrent for 8 miles (13 km) with U.S. Route 31 (US 31), including an intersection with Interstate 65 (I-65) near the geographical center of the state. The route proceeds towards Verbena and then crosses Lake Jordan.

The route continues east-northeast through Rockford, Alexander City, New Site and Roanoke on its way to the Georgia state line, where the road becomes Georgia State Route 34. The route is paved throughout and occasionally multi-lane. Counties traversed by the route include Dallas, Chilton, Coosa, Tallapoosa, Chambers, and Randolph.

== Major intersections ==
| County | Location | mi | km | Destinations | Notes |
|---|---|---|---|---|---|
| Dallas | Safford | 0.000 | 0.000 | SR 5 – Mobile, Browns, Birmingham | Western terminus |
| Dallas | | 19.181 | 30.869 | SR 219 north / SR 22 Truck east | Southern terminus of SR 219; western terminus of SR 22 Truck |
| Dallas | Selma | 23.487 | 37.799 | US 80 Bus. east (Broad Street/SR 8) – Montgomery | Western end of US 80 Bus./SR 8 concurrency |
| Dallas | Selma | 24.989 | 40.216 | US 80 / SR 14 / SR 22 Truck west (Highland Avenue/SR 8) – Meridian, Prattville | Eastern end of US 80 Bus./SR 8 concurrency; eastern terminus of SR 22 Truck |
| Chilton | Maplesville | 50.214 | 80.812 | US 82 (SR 6) – Centreville, Prattville, Tuscaloosa | Interchange |
| Chilton | Maplesville | 51.702 | 83.206 | SR 22 Truck east (Foshee Avenue) | Western terminus of SR 22 Truck |
| Chilton | Maplesville | 51.765 | 83.308 | SR 139 north – Randolph, Birmingham | Northern terminus of SR 139 |
| Chilton | Maplesville | 51.935 | 83.581 | SR 22 Truck west (Foshee Avenue) – truck route to SR 139 | Eastern terminus of SR 22 Truck |
| Chilton | | 54.672 | 87.986 | SR 191 north – Jemison, Birmingham | Southern terminus of SR 191 |
| Chilton | Clanton | 66.717 | 107.371 | US 31 north (7th Street/SR 3) / SR 145 north (4th Avenue North) – Birmingham | Western end of US 31/SR 3 concurrency |
| Chilton | Clanton | 70.962 | 114.202 | I-65 – Birmingham, Montgomery | I-65 exit 205 |
| Chilton | | 75.019 | 120.731 | US 31 south (SR 3) – Verbena | Eastern end of US 31/SR 3 concurrency |
| Coosa | Rockford | 95.972 | 154.452 | US 231 / SR 21 (Main Street/SR 53) – Sylacauga, Wetumpka | |
| Coosa | | 104.049 | 167.451 | SR 9 south – Wetumpka | Western end of SR 9 concurrency |
| Coosa | | 104.092 | 167.520 | SR 9 north – Goodwater | Eastern end of SR 9 concurrency |
| Tallapoosa | Alexander City | 110.890 | 178.460 | SR 259 south | Northern terminus of SR 259 |
| Tallapoosa | Alexander City | 112.864 | 181.637 | US 280 west (SR 38) / Lee Street – Alexander City, Sylacauga, Birmingham | Western end of US 280/SR 38 concurrency |
| Tallapoosa | Alexander City | 114.556 | 184.360 | US 280 east (SR 38) / SR 63 south – Dadeville, Eclectic | Eastern end of US 280/SR 38 concurrency; western end of SR 63 concurrency |
| Tallapoosa | Alexander City | 116.307 | 187.178 | SR 63 north (Central Avenue) | Eastern end of SR 63 concurrency |
| Tallapoosa | New Site | 129.507 | 208.421 | SR 49 south – Horseshoe Bend National Military Park | Western end of SR 49 concurrency |
| Tallapoosa | New Site | 130.526 | 210.061 | SR 49 north – Ashland, Lineville | Eastern end of SR 49 concurrency |
| Chambers | No major junctions | | | | |
| Randolph | Wadley | 146.492 | 235.756 | SR 77 north – Ashland, Southern Union State Community College | Western end of SR 77 concurrency |
| Randolph | | 147.803 | 237.866 | SR 77 south – LaFayette, Abanda | Eastern end of SR 77 concurrency |
| Randolph | Roanoke | 160.107 | 257.667 | US 431 (SR 1) – Wedowee, LaFayette | |
| Randolph | | 168.543 | 271.244 | SR 34 east – Franklin | Georgia state line; eastern terminus |
1.000 mi = 1.609 km; 1.000 km = 0.621 mi: Concurrency terminus

== Related routes ==
=== Selma truck route ===
State Route 22 Truck
- Location: Selma
- Length: 3.4 mi (5.5 km)

=== Major intersections ===
The entire route is in Dallas County.

| Location | mi | km | Destinations | Notes |
|---|---|---|---|---|
| | 0.00 | 0.00 | SR 22 / SR 219 begins | Western terminus; southern terminus of SR 219; western end of SR 219 concurrency |
| Selma | 1.2 | 1.9 | US 80 west / SR 219 north – Meridian | Eastern end of SR 219 concurrency; western end of US 80 concurrency |
| Selma | 2.1 | 3.4 | SR 14 west | Western end of SR 14 concurrency |
| Selma | 2.7 | 4.3 | US 80 east / US 80 Bus. east / US 80 Truck east / SR 14 east / SR 22 | Eastern terminus; eastern terminus of US 80 Business; eastern end of SR 14 concurrency |
1.000 mi = 1.609 km; 1.000 km = 0.621 mi: Concurrency terminus

=== Maplesville truck route ===
State Route 22 Truck
- Location: Maplesville
- Length: 0.3 mi (480 m)

=== Major intersections ===
The entire route is in Chilton County.

| Location | mi | km | Destinations | Notes |
|---|---|---|---|---|
| Maplesville | 0.00 | 0.00 | SR 22 | Southern terminus |
| Maplesville | 0.3 | 0.48 | SR 22 | Northern terminus |
1.000 mi = 1.609 km; 1.000 km = 0.621 mi
