= List of highways numbered 259 =

The following highways are numbered 259:

== Brazil ==
- BR-259

== Canada ==
- Manitoba Provincial Road 259
- Prince Edward Island Route 259
- Quebec Route 259

== Japan ==
- Japan National Route 259

== United Kingdom ==
- A259 road
- B259 road

== United States ==
- U.S. Route 259
- Alabama State Route 259
- California State Route 259
- Florida State Road 259 (former)
- Georgia State Route 259 (former)
- Iowa Highway 259 (former)
- Kentucky Route 259
- Maryland Route 259
- Minnesota State Highway 259 (former)
- Montana Secondary Highway 259
- New York State Route 259
- Oklahoma State Highway 259A
- Pennsylvania Route 259
- Tennessee State Route 259
- Texas State Highway 259 (former)
- Utah State Route 259
- Virginia State Route 259
- West Virginia Route 259
- Wyoming Highway 259

Preceded by 258	Lists of highways 259	Succeeded by 260
