= List of highways numbered 254 =

The following highways are numbered 254:

== Canada ==
- Manitoba Provincial Road 254
- Prince Edward Island Route 254

== Costa Rica ==
- National Route 254

== Ireland ==
- R254 regional road

== Japan ==
- Japan National Route 254

== United Kingdom ==
- A254 road
- B254 road

== United States ==
- Arkansas Highway 254
- California State Route 254
- Connecticut Route 254
- Georgia State Route 254
- K-254 (Kansas highway)
- Kentucky Route 254
- Maryland Route 254
- Minnesota State Highway 254
- Missouri Route 254
- Montana Secondary Highway 254
- New Mexico State Road 254
- New York State Route 254
- Ohio State Route 254
- Pennsylvania Route 254
- South Carolina Highway 254
- Tennessee State Route 254
- Texas State Highway 254
  - Texas State Highway Loop 254
  - Farm to Market Road 254 (Texas)
- Utah State Route 254 (former)
- Virginia State Route 254
- Wyoming Highway 254

Preceded by 253	Lists of highways 254	Succeeded by 255
