= List of highways numbered 251 =

The following highways are numbered 251:

== Canada ==
- Manitoba Provincial Road 251
- Prince Edward Island Route 251
- Quebec Route 251

== Costa Rica ==
- National Route 251

== Japan ==
- Japan National Route 251

== Korea, South ==
- Honam Expressway Branch

== United Kingdom ==
- A251 road
- B251 road

== United States ==
- Alabama State Route 251
- California State Route 251
- Florida State Road 251 (former)
- Georgia State Route 251
- Illinois Route 251
- K-251 (Kansas highway)
- Kentucky Route 251
- Minnesota State Highway 251
- Montana Secondary Highway 251
- New York State Route 251
- Ohio State Route 251
- Oklahoma State Highway 251A
- Oregon Route 251
- Pennsylvania Route 251
- South Dakota Highway 251
- Tennessee State Route 251
- Texas State Highway 251
  - Farm to Market Road 251 (Texas)
- Utah State Route 251 (former)
- Virginia State Route 251
- Washington State Route 251 (former)
- West Virginia Route 251
- Wyoming Highway 251

Territories:

- Puerto Rico Highway 251

Preceded by 250	Lists of highways 251	Succeeded by 252
