= List of highways numbered 255 =

The following highways are numbered 255:

== Canada ==
- Manitoba Provincial Road 255
- New Brunswick Route 255
- Nova Scotia Route 255
- Quebec Route 255
- Saskatchewan Highway 255

== Costa Rica ==
- National Route 255

== Japan ==
- Japan National Route 255

== Korea, South ==
- Gangjin–Gwangju Expressway

== United Kingdom ==
- A255 road
- B255 road

== United States ==
- Interstate 255
- Alabama State Route 255
- Arkansas Highway 255
- California State Route 255
- Florida State Road 255 (former)
- Georgia State Route 255
- Illinois Route 255
- K-255 (Kansas highway)
- Kentucky Route 255
- Maryland Route 255
- Montana Secondary Highway 255
- New Mexico State Road 255
- New York State Route 255 (former)
- Ohio State Route 255
- Oregon Route 255
- Pennsylvania Route 255
- Tennessee State Route 255
- Texas State Highway 255
- Utah State Route 255 (former)
- Virginia State Route 255
- Wyoming Highway 255

Preceded by 254	Lists of highways 255	Succeeded by 256
