= List of highways numbered 256 =

The following highways are numbered 256:

== Canada ==
- Manitoba Provincial Road 256
- Prince Edward Island Route 256
- Nova Scotia Route 256

== Costa Rica ==
- National Route 256

== Japan ==
- Japan National Route 256

== United Kingdom ==
- A256 road
- B256 road

== United States ==
- California State Route 256 (former)
- Colorado State Highway 256
- Georgia State Route 256
- Indiana State Road 256
- K-256 (Kansas highway)
- Kentucky Route 256
- Maryland Route 256
- Minnesota State Highway 256
- Montana Secondary Highway 256
- New Mexico State Road 256
- New York State Route 256
- North Dakota Highway 256
- Ohio State Route 256
- Pennsylvania Route 256 (former)
- Tennessee State Route 256
- Texas State Highway 256
  - Texas State Highway Loop 256
  - Farm to Market Road 256 (Texas)
- Utah State Route 256
- Virginia State Route 256
- Wyoming Highway 256

Preceded by 255	Lists of highways 256	Succeeded by 257
