= List of highways numbered 257 =

The following highways are numbered 257:

== Canada ==
- Manitoba Provincial Road 257
- Prince Edward Island Route 257
- Quebec Route 257

== Costa Rica ==
- National Route 257

== Japan ==
- Japan National Route 257

== United Kingdom ==
- A257 road

== United States ==
- Alabama State Route 257
- California State Route 257
- Colorado State Highway 257
- Florida State Road 257 (former)
- Georgia State Route 257
- Indiana State Road 257
- K-257 (Kansas highway)
- Kentucky Route 257
- Maryland Route 257
- Minnesota State Highway 257
- Montana Secondary Highway 257
- New York State Route 257
- Ohio State Route 257
- Pennsylvania Route 257
- Tennessee State Route 257
- Texas State Highway 257 (former)
  - Texas State Highway Loop 257
  - Farm to Market Road 257 (Texas)
- Utah State Route 257
- Virginia State Route 257

Preceded by 256	Lists of highways 257	Succeeded by 258
