= List of highways numbered 260 =

Route 260, or Highway 260, may refer to:

== Australia ==
- Loddon Valley Highway

== Canada ==
- Manitoba Provincial Road 260
- New Brunswick Route 260
- Prince Edward Island Route 260

== Japan ==
- Japan National Route 260

== Turkey ==
- State road D.260 (Turkey)

== United Kingdom ==
- A260 road
- B260 road

== United States ==
- U.S. Route 260 (former)
- Arizona State Route 260
- California State Route 260
- Georgia State Route 260
- K-260 (Kansas Highway)
- Kentucky Route 260
- Maryland Route 260
- New York State Route 260
- Ohio State Route 260
- Oregon Route 260
- Pennsylvania Route 260 (former)
- South Carolina Highway 260
- Tennessee State Route 260
- Texas State Highway 260 (former)
  - Texas State Highway Loop 260 (former)
  - Texas State Highway Spur 260
- Utah State Route 260
- Washington State Route 260

Preceded by 259	Lists of highways 260	Succeeded by 261
