= List of highways numbered 252 =

Route 252 or Highway 252 may refer to:

== Canada ==
- Manitoba Provincial Road 252
- Nova Scotia Route 252

== Costa Rica ==
- National Route 252

== Cuba ==
- Consolacion del Sur–Alonso Rojas Road (1–252)

== Japan ==
- Japan National Route 252

== United Kingdom ==
- A252 road
- B252 road

== United States ==
- Arkansas Highway 252
- California State Route 252 (former)
- Georgia State Route 252
- Indiana State Road 252
- Iowa Highway 252 (former)
- K-252 (Kansas highway)
- Kentucky Route 252
- Minnesota State Highway 252
- Montana Secondary Highway 252
- New Mexico State Road 252
- New York State Route 252
  - New York State Route 252A
- Ohio State Route 252
- Pennsylvania Route 252
- South Carolina Highway 252
- Tennessee State Route 252
- Texas State Highway Loop 252
- Texas State Highway 252 (former)
- Farm to Market Road 252 (Texas)
- Utah State Route 252
- Virginia State Route 252
- West Virginia Route 252
- Wyoming Highway 252

Territories:

- Puerto Rico Highway 252

Preceded by 251	Lists of highways 252	Succeeded by 253
