= List of highways numbered 258 =

The following highways are numbered 258:

== Ireland ==
- R258 regional road

== Japan ==
- Japan National Route 258

== United Kingdom ==
- A258 road
- B258 road

== United States ==
- U.S. Route 258
- California State Route 258
- Georgia State Route 258 (former)
- Indiana State Road 258
- Iowa Highway 258 (former)
- K-258 (Kansas highway)
- Kentucky Route 258
- Maryland Route 258
- Minnesota State Highway 258
- Montana Secondary Highway 258
- New Mexico State Road 258
- New York State Route 258
- Ohio State Route 258
- Pennsylvania Route 258
- South Dakota Highway 258
- Tennessee State Route 258
- Texas State Highway 258
  - Farm to Market Road 258 (Texas)
- Utah State Route 258
- Wyoming Highway 258

Preceded by 257	Lists of highways 258	Succeeded by 259
