= List of highways numbered 253 =

Route 253 or Highway 253 may refer to:

== Canada ==
- Nova Scotia Route 253
- Quebec Route 253

== Costa Rica ==
- National Route 253

== Japan ==
- Japan National Route 253

== Korea, South ==
- Gochang–Damyang Expressway

== United Kingdom ==
- A253 road
- B253 road

== United States ==
- Alabama State Route 253
- Arkansas Highway 253
- California State Route 253
- Georgia State Route 253
- Iowa Highway 253 (former)
- K-253 (Kansas highway)
- Kentucky Route 253
- Maryland Route 253
- Minnesota State Highway 253
- Montana Secondary Highway 253
- New Mexico State Road 253
- New York State Route 253
- Ohio State Route 253
- Pennsylvania Route 253
- South Carolina Highway 253
- South Dakota Highway 253
- Tennessee State Route 253
- Texas State Highway 253 (former)
  - Farm to Market Road 253 (Texas)
- Utah State Route 253 (former)
- Vermont Route 253
- Virginia State Route 253
- Wisconsin Highway 253
- Wyoming Highway 253

Territories

- Puerto Rico Highway 253

Preceded by 252	Lists of highways 253	Succeeded by 254
