= Adalius Thomas =

American football player (born 1977)

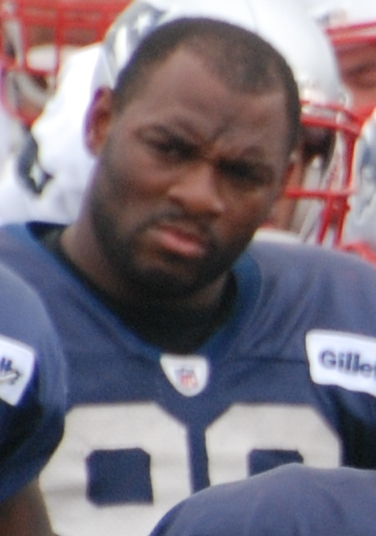
- Thomas with the New England Patriots in 2009

No. 96
- Position: Linebacker

Personal information
- Born: August 18, 1977 (age 49); Equality, Alabama, U.S.
- Listed height: 6 ft 2 in (1.88 m)
- Listed weight: 270 lb (122 kg)

Career information
- High school: Central Coosa (Rockford, Alabama)
- College: Southern Miss
- NFL draft: 2000: 6th round, 186th overall pick

Career history
- Baltimore Ravens (2000–2006); New England Patriots (2007–2009)

Awards and highlights
- Super Bowl champion (XXXV); First-team All-Pro (2006); 2× Pro Bowl (2003, 2006); Second-team All-American (1999); Liberty Bowl MVP (1999); 2× C-USA Defensive Player of the Year (1998, 1999); Led NFL in non-offensive touchdowns in 2005

Career NFL statistics
- Total tackles: 523
- Sacks: 53
- Forced fumbles: 15
- Fumble recoveries: 6
- Interceptions: 7
- Defensive touchdowns: 6
- Stats at Pro Football Reference

Adalius Donquail Thomas (/əˈdeɪləs/; born July 18, 1977) is an American former professional football player who was a linebacker for ten seasons in the National Football League (NFL). He played college football for the Southern Miss Golden Eagles. He was selected by the Baltimore Ravens in the sixth round of the 2000 NFL draft, and also played for the NFL's New England Patriots.

== Early life ==
Thomas attended Central Coosa High School in Rockford, Alabama, and was a letterman in football and basketball. In football, as a senior, he was named as a Class 4A all-state selection by the Birmingham News and as an honorable mention Class 4A all-state selection by the Montgomery Advertiser. In basketball, as a senior, he led his team to the State Title and was named the Alabama Class 4A Player of the Year.

== College career ==
Thomas attended the University of Southern Mississippi, where he was a star defensive end for coach Jeff Bower's Southern Miss Golden Eagles football team. Thomas led one of the top defenses in college football, notching Conference USA Defensive Player of the Year honors his junior and senior years. The Golden Eagles won three Conference USA championships (1996, 1997, and 1999) in his four years in Hattiesburg, losing only two conference games and winning two Liberty Bowls.

Thomas was named a Freshman All-American by the Sporting News in 1996, leading the Golden Eagles to an 8–3 record and a share of the Conference USA title. Southern Miss finished 9–3 in Thomas's sophomore season, en route to a Conference USA Championship and a victory in the Liberty Bowl. Thomas was named to the All-Conference first-team.

Statistically speaking, Thomas's best season came in 1998, when he tallied 71 tackles, in addition to a conference-high 12.5 sacks and 20 tackles-for-loss. Thomas was named a first-team All-American and tied for Defensive Player of the Year. Thomas earned third-team All-American and Defensive Player of the Year honors as a senior, in addition to being named the MVP of the 1999 Liberty Bowl. He was also named as a finalist for the Conerly Trophy.

Thomas was also a power forward on the Golden Eagles basketball team in the 1995–96 and 1996–97 seasons, making him the first player in USM history to play both football and basketball.

== Professional career ==
Pre-draft measurables
Height	Weight	Arm length	Hand span	40-yard dash	10-yard split	20-yard split	20-yard shuttle	Vertical jump	Broad jump
6 ft 2 3/8 in (1.89 m)	270 lb (122 kg)	33 in (0.84 m)	9 1/4 in (0.23 m)	4.54 s	1.58 s	2.64 s	4.42 s	38.5 in (0.98 m)	10 ft 0 in (3.05 m)
All values from NFL Combine

=== Baltimore Ravens ===
Thomas was drafted by the Baltimore Ravens in the sixth round (186th overall) in the 2000 NFL draft. Competing with Peter Boulware and Michael McCrary for playing time, Thomas made only 89 tackles in his first three years. He was inactive for 12 games in his rookie season, but played in all 16 games in the 2001 season, starting two at defensive end. In 2002, he started 12 games at defensive end, recording two interceptions as well as 15 special teams tackles. In 2003, Thomas was recognized for his special teams play and was selected to his first Pro Bowl. That year, he registered 34 tackles, 8 passes defended, 4 sacks, and a forced fumble. He was placed on injured reserve by the Ravens on December 17, but still led the team with 23 special teams tackles.

In 2004, Thomas started all 16 games for the first time in his career. While still collecting 16 special teams tackles, he amassed 72 tackles, 4 forced fumbles, 5 passes defended, an interception and 8 sacks. In 2005, with Boulware relegated to situational pass-rush duty, Thomas was named the starting outside linebacker, where he accumulated 84 total tackles and 9 sacks. He also saw limited time at cornerback during that season. He had two interceptions on the year and three forced fumbles; he returned three turnovers for touchdowns, making him the NFL's leader in non-offensive touchdowns that season.

Thomas earned his second Pro Bowl bid in 2006 as part of a Ravens defense that finished first in the league en route to a 13–3 record. He was a first-team All-Pro after setting a career-high with 106 tackles and 11 sacks, as well as notching 1 interception, 1 safety, 7 passes defensed, and 1 fumble recovery returned 57 yards for a touchdown. It proved to be, without a doubt, his finest season as a pro.

=== New England Patriots ===
On March 3, 2007, Thomas signed a 5-year contract with the New England Patriots worth $35 million, including $20 million in guaranteed money. After the move, Patriots head coach Bill Belichick told Thomas that he had "backed up the Brink's truck" to pay him. Thomas played mainly at inside linebacker in the Patriots' 3-4 defense in 2007, rotating with veterans Tedy Bruschi and Junior Seau. As the Patriots progressed through an undefeated 2007 regular season, Thomas handed out "humble pie" T-shirts to his teammates in the locker room, echoing's Belichick's message of staying humble after each win. After a season-ending injury to outside linebacker Rosevelt Colvin in late November, Thomas started the remainder of the season and eventually Super Bowl XLII at outside linebacker. In that game, Thomas had a postseason-high two sacks and a forced fumble.

Thomas continued to start at outside linebacker for the Patriots in 2008. He led the team with five sacks until suffering a season-ending arm injury in Week 10 against the Buffalo Bills. He was placed on injured reserve on December 5.

In 2009, Thomas began the season on the active list; however, he was deactivated for the October 18 game against the Tennessee Titans. Recording one sack on the season to that point, Thomas was asked by the press if he used the decision by Belichick as motivation to perform better. He responded "I don't need something like this to fire me up. This isn't kindergarten. I don't play [those] games."

Thomas was one of four Patriots sent home as a result of being late for a morning meeting on a snowy Wednesday morning prior to the Patriots' Week 14 matchup against the Carolina Panthers. The next day, Thomas told the press that he called the team saying that he was stuck in traffic but was still sent home upon arriving. He also continued to question the perceived motivational aspect of the decision, saying "Motivation is for kindergartners. I'm not a kindergartner." He was again deactivated for the game against the Panthers, but started the Patriots' Week 15 game against the Buffalo Bills.

Thomas finished the 2009 season with 11 starts in 14 games played, recording 34 tackles and three sacks.

Thomas was released by the Patriots on April 26, 2010, one day after the 2010 NFL draft.

== NFL career statistics ==
Legend
	Led the league
**Bold**	Career high

=== Regular season ===
Year	Team	Games		Tackles					Interceptions					Fumbles			
Year	Team	GP	GS	Cmb	Solo	Ast	Sck	TFL	Int	Yds	TD	Lng	PD	FF	FR	Yds	TD
2000	BAL	3	0	0	0	0	0.0	0	0	0	0	0	0	0	0	0	0
2001	BAL	**16**	3	40	33	7	3.5	6	0	0	0	0	**8**	3	0	0	0
2002	BAL	**16**	12	52	39	13	3.0	10	**2**	57	**1**	32	**8**	1	1	0	0
2003	BAL	13	11	44	41	3	4.0	9	0	0	0	0	6	1	0	0	0
2004	BAL	**16**	**16**	72	55	17	8.0	11	1	8	0	8	5	**4**	0	0	0
2005	BAL	**16**	**16**	**86**	**71**	15	9.0	8	**2**	48	**1**	28	5	**4**	**4**	44	**2**
2006	BAL	**16**	**16**	83	64	19	**11.0**	**14**	1	7	0	7	7	0	1	**57**	1
2007	NWE	**16**	15	79	58	**21**	6.5	10	1	**65**	**1**	**65**	**8**	2	0	0	0
2008	NWE	9	9	33	24	9	5.0	7	0	0	0	0	4	0	0	0	0
2009	NWE	14	11	34	26	8	3.0	7	0	0	0	0	2	0	0	0	0
		135	109	523	411	112	53.0	82	7	185	3	65	53	15	6	101	3

=== Playoffs ===
Year	Team	Games		Tackles					Interceptions					Fumbles			
Year	Team	GP	GS	Cmb	Solo	Ast	Sck	TFL	Int	Yds	TD	Lng	PD	FF	FR	Yds	TD
2000	BAL	1	0	1	1	0	0.0	0	0	0	0	0	**1**	0	0	0	0
2001	BAL	2	0	4	1	**3**	0.5	0	0	0	0	0	0	0	0	0	0
2003	BAL	Did not play															
2006	BAL	1	1	8	7	1	0.5	1	0	0	0	0	0	0	0	0	0
2007	NWE	**3**	**3**	**10**	**8**	2	**2.0**	**2**	0	0	0	0	**1**	**1**	0	0	0
2009	NWE	1	1	7	5	2	0.0	0	0	0	0	0	0	0	0	0	0
		8	5	30	22	8	3.0	3	0	0	0	0	2	1	0	0	0
