= Wilton, Alabama =

- Town
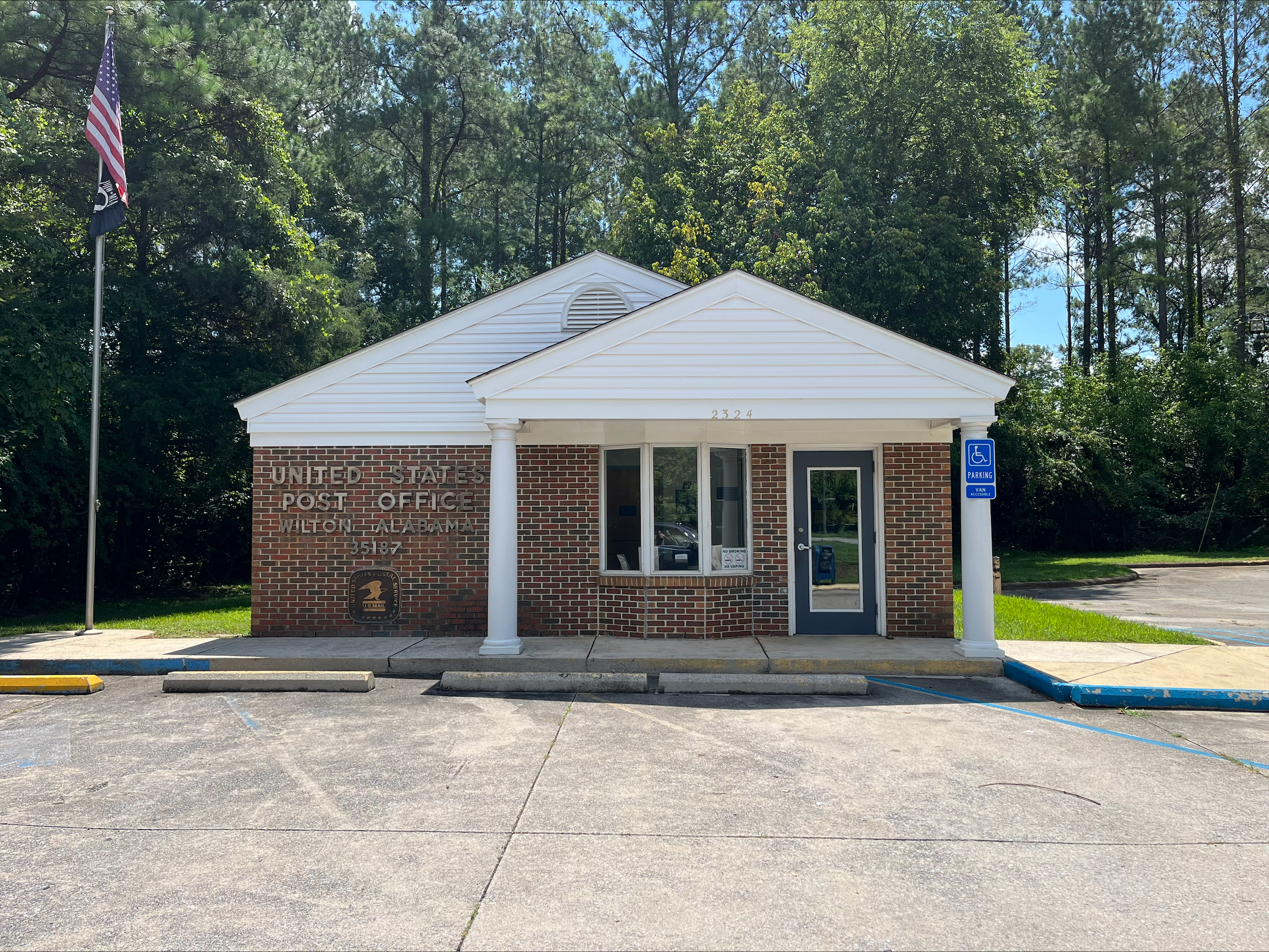
- Wilton Post Office

- Location of Wilton in Shelby County, Alabama.
- Coordinates: 33°04′52″N 86°52′36″W
- Country: United States
- State: Alabama
- County: Shelby

Area
  - Total: 0.96 sq mi (2.49 km^{2})
  - Land: 0.96 sq mi (2.48 km^{2})
  - Water: 0.0039 sq mi (0.01 km^{2})
- Elevation: 390 ft (120 m)

Population (2020)
  - Total: 587
  - Density: 613.1/sq mi (236.71/km^{2})
- Time zone: UTC-6 (Central (CST))
  - Summer (DST): UTC-5 (CDT)
- ZIP code: 35187
- Area codes: 205, 659
- FIPS code: 01-82872
- GNIS feature ID: 2406895
- Website: www.wiltonalabama.net

Wilton, also known by the previous names of Birmingham Junction, Bismark, and Catoosa, is a town in southwest Shelby County, Alabama, United States. It was incorporated in 1918. This town is part of the Birmingham–Hoover–Cullman Combined Statistical Area. As of the 2020 census, Wilton had a population of 587.

== History ==
Wilton was originally known as Birmingham Junction, in reference to when the Southern Railroad was joined here with the Alabama and Tennessee River Railroad. It was next known as Bismark, in honor of Otto von Bismarck. Next, the community was known as Catoosa, in honor of Catoosa County, Georgia. Finally, the town went by Wilton, in honor of Wilton, England. One structure in Wilton, the Woods-Cleveland-Cooling House, located on the Head-Cleveland farm, is listed on the Alabama Register of Landmarks and Heritage.

== Geography ==
According to the U.S. Census Bureau, the town has a total area of 0.8 square miles (2.1 km^{2}), all land.

== Demographics ==
Historical population
Census	Pop.	Note	%±
1920	522		—
1930	562		7.7%
1940	422		−24.9%
1950	413		−2.1%
1960	428		3.6%
1970	573		33.9%
1980	642		12.0%
1990	602		−6.2%
2000	580		−3.7%
2010	687		18.4%
2020	587		−14.6%
U.S. Decennial Census; 2013 Estimate

=== 2020 census ===
Wilton town, Alabama – Racial and ethnic composition Note: the US Census treats Hispanic/Latino as an ethnic category. This table excludes Latinos from the racial categories and assigns them to a separate category. Hispanics/Latinos may be of any race.
Race / Ethnicity (NH = Non-Hispanic)	Pop 2000	Pop 2010	Pop 2020	% 2000	% 2010	% 2020
White alone (NH)	411	482	367	70.86%	70.16%	62.52%
Black or African American alone (NH)	137	156	133	23.62%	22.71%	22.66%
Native American or Alaska Native alone (NH)	1	0	1	0.17%	0.00%	0.17%
Asian alone (NH)	1	1	0	0.17%	0.15%	0.00%
Native Hawaiian or Pacific Islander alone (NH)	0	0	0	0.00%	0.00%	0.00%
Other race alone (NH)	0	2	7	0.00%	0.29%	1.19%
Mixed race or Multiracial (NH)	11	14	22	1.90%	2.04%	3.75%
Hispanic or Latino (any race)	19	32	57	3.28%	4.66%	9.71%
Total	580	687	587	100.00%	100.00%	100.00%

=== 2000 census ===
As of the census of 2000, there were 580 people, 222 households, and 166 families residing in the town. The population density was 697.1 inhabitants per square mile (269.2/km^{2}). There were 253 housing units at an average density of 304.1 per square mile (117.4/km^{2}). The racial makeup of the town was 73.28% White, 23.62% Black or African American, 0.86% Native American, 0.17% Asian, and 2.07% from two or more races. 3.28% of the population were Hispanic or Latino of any race.

There were 222 households, out of which 29.7% had children under the age of 18 living with them, 55.0% were married couples living together, 14.4% had a female householder with no husband present, and 24.8% were non-families. 21.6% of all households were made up of individuals, and 7.7% had someone living alone who was 65 years of age or older. The average household size was 2.61 and the average family size was 3.07.

In the town, the population was spread out, with 24.8% under the age of 18, 10.7% from 18 to 24, 31.0% from 25 to 44, 23.3% from 45 to 64, and 10.2% who were 65 years of age or older. The median age was 33 years. For every 100 females, there were 102.8 males. For every 100 females age 18 and over, there were 95.5 males.

The median income for a household in the town was $33,750, and the median income for a family was $40,833. Males had a median income of $30,893 versus $20,500 for females. The per capita income for the town was $15,056. About 9.4% of families and 12.9% of the population were below the poverty line, including 27.5% of those under age 18 and 10.9% of those age 65 or over.
