= Coosa County School District =

School district in Alabama

Coosa County School District is a school district in Coosa County, Alabama which serves the community of Rockford. It operates three schools: Central Elementary School, Central High School and the Coosa County Career and Tech Center.
