= Equality, Alabama =

- Census-designated place
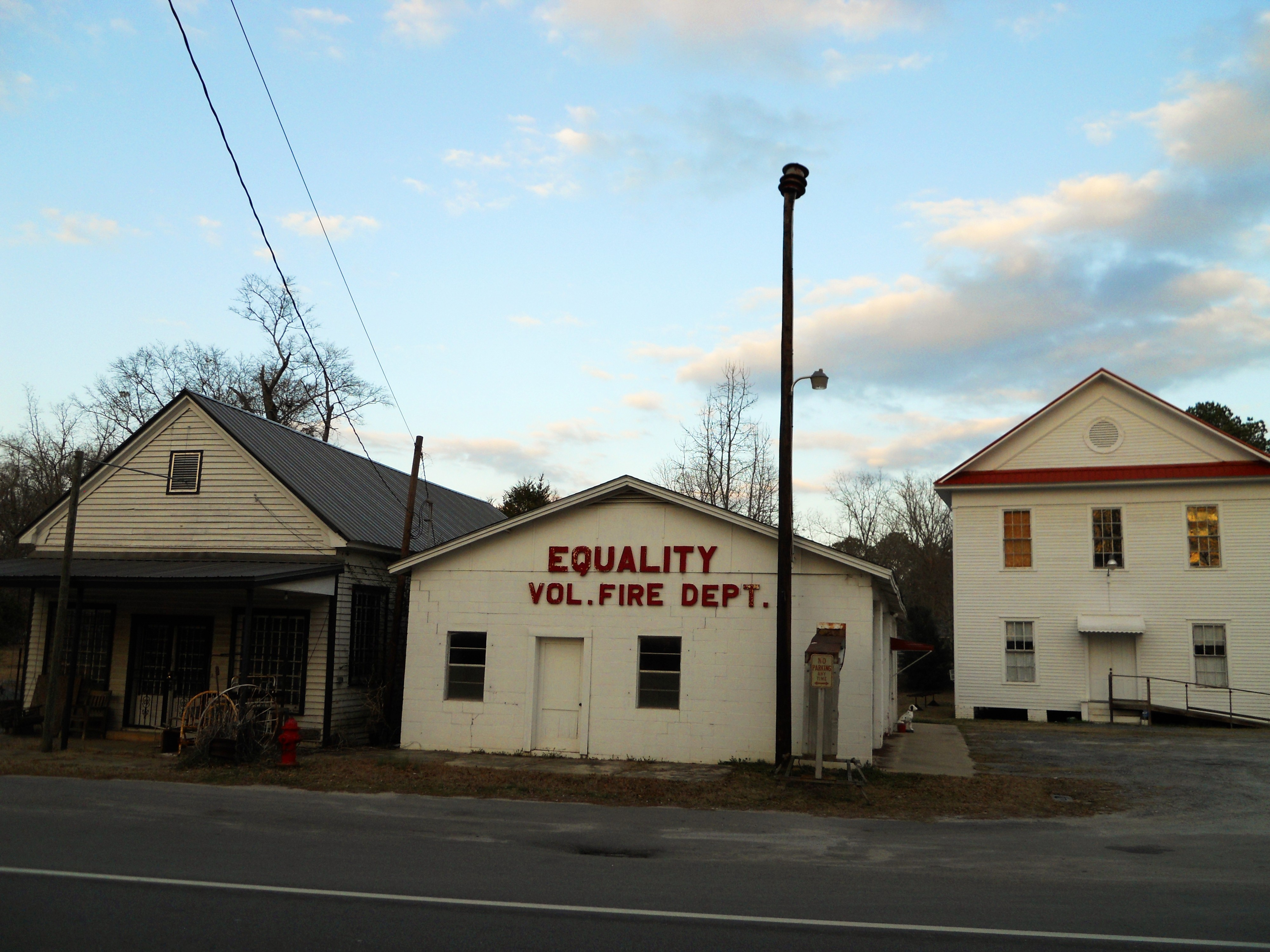
- Equality, Alabama

- Location within Alabama Location within the United States
- Coordinates: 32°45′43″N 86°06′07″W
- Country: United States
- State: Alabama
- County: Coosa, Elmore

Area
  - Total: 5.26 sq mi (13.63 km^{2})
  - Land: 5.25 sq mi (13.60 km^{2})
  - Water: 0.0077 sq mi (0.02 km^{2})
- Elevation: 735 ft (224 m)

Population (2020)
  - Total: 150
  - Density: 28.6/sq mi (11.03/km^{2})
- Time zone: UTC-6 (Central (CST))
  - Summer (DST): UTC-5 (CDT)
- Area codes: 256 & 938, 334
- GNIS feature ID: 2805889

Equality is a census-designated place in Coosa County, Alabama, United States. It was first named as a CDP in the 2020 Census which listed a population of 150. The Equality post office serves the ZIP Code of 36026, and its delivery area includes rural land to the south in Elmore County.

== Demographics ==
Historical population
Census	Pop.	Note	%±
1920	200		—
1930	196		−2.0%
2020	150		—
U.S. Decennial Census; 2020

Equality was listed as an incorporated community within the boundaries of Coosa County during the 1920 and 1930 U.S. censuses.

=== 2020 census ===
Equality CDP, Alabama – Racial and ethnic composition Note: the US Census treats Hispanic/Latino as an ethnic category. This table excludes Latinos from the racial categories and assigns them to a separate category. Hispanics/Latinos may be of any race.
Race / Ethnicity (NH = Non-Hispanic)	Pop 2020	% 2020
White alone (NH)	123	82.00%
Black or African American alone (NH)	16	10.67%
Native American or Alaska Native alone (NH)	0	0.00%
Asian alone (NH)	0	0.00%
Native Hawaiian or Pacific Islander alone (NH)	0	0.00%
Other race alone (NH)	0	0.00%
Mixed race or Multiracial (NH)	8	5.33%
Hispanic or Latino (any race)	3	2.00%
Total	150	100.00%

== Notable persons ==
- Pauley Perrette, actress best known for playing Abby Sciuto on the U.S. TV series NCIS.
- Adalius Thomas, former NFL football player
