= Kellyton, Alabama =

- Town
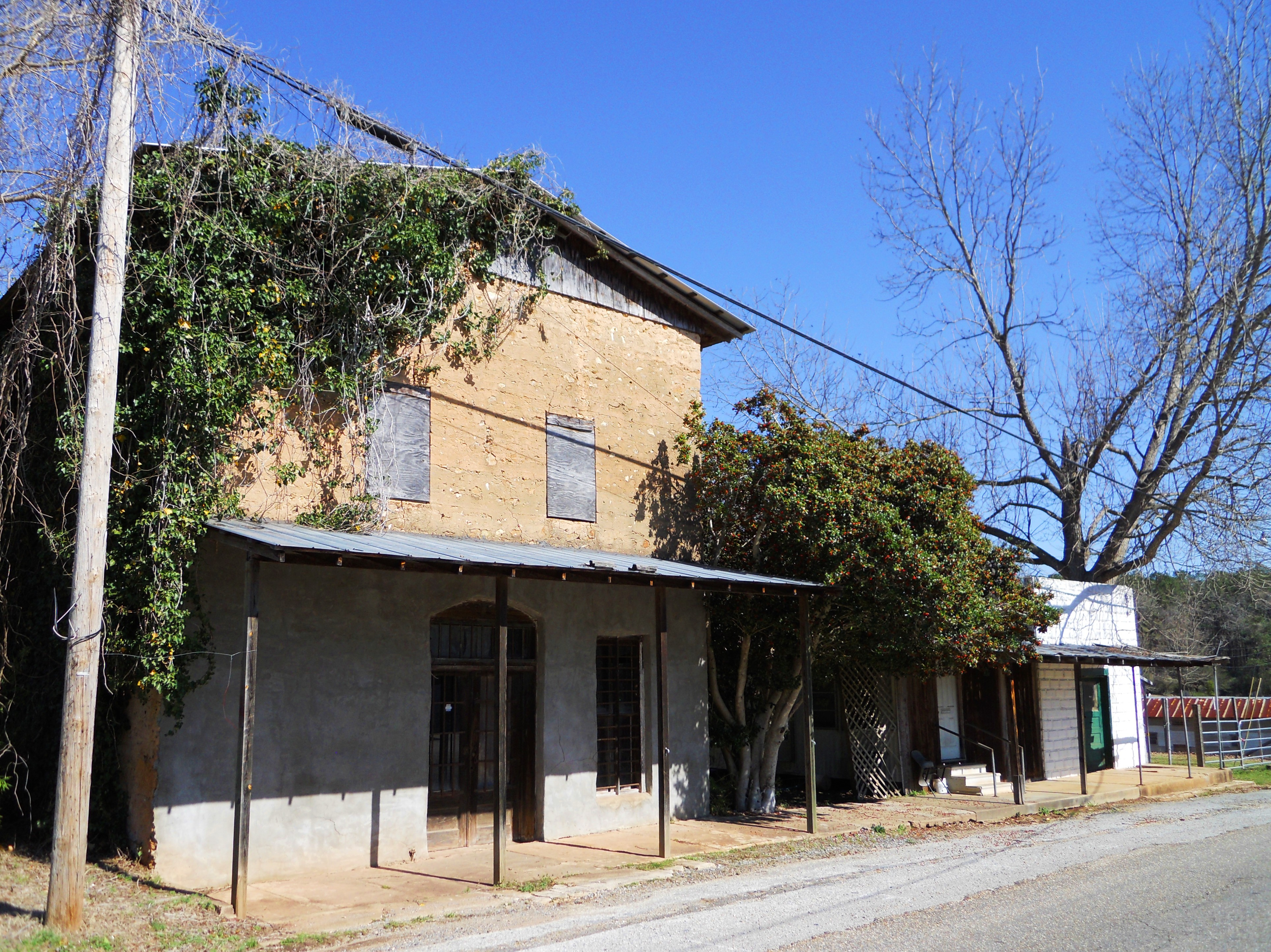
- Kellyton, Alabama in 2011

- Location of Kellyton in Coosa County, Alabama.
- Coordinates: 32°58′45″N 86°02′09″W
- Country: United States
- State: Alabama
- County: Coosa

Area
  - Total: 0.97 sq mi (2.51 km^{2})
  - Land: 0.97 sq mi (2.50 km^{2})
  - Water: 0 sq mi (0.00 km^{2})
- Elevation: 748 ft (228 m)

Population (2020)
  - Total: 129
  - Density: 133.4/sq mi (51.52/km^{2})
- Time zone: UTC-6 (Central (CST))
  - Summer (DST): UTC-5 (CDT)
- Postal code: 35089
- Area codes: 256 & 938
- FIPS code: 01-39472
- GNIS feature ID: 2405933

Kellyton is an incorporated town in Coosa County, Alabama, United States. As of the 2020 census, Kellyton had a population of 129.

The town is part of the Talladega-Sylacauga Micropolitan Statistical Area.

== Demographics ==
Historical population
Census	Pop.	Note	%±
1920	241		—
1930	168		−30.3%
2010	217		—
2020	129		−40.6%
U.S. Decennial Census; 2013 Estimate

Kellyton was previously listed in the 1920 and 1930 U.S. Censuses as an incorporated community. It did not appear again on the census until 2010.

== Notable person ==
- Justin Tuck, NFL player

== Gallery ==
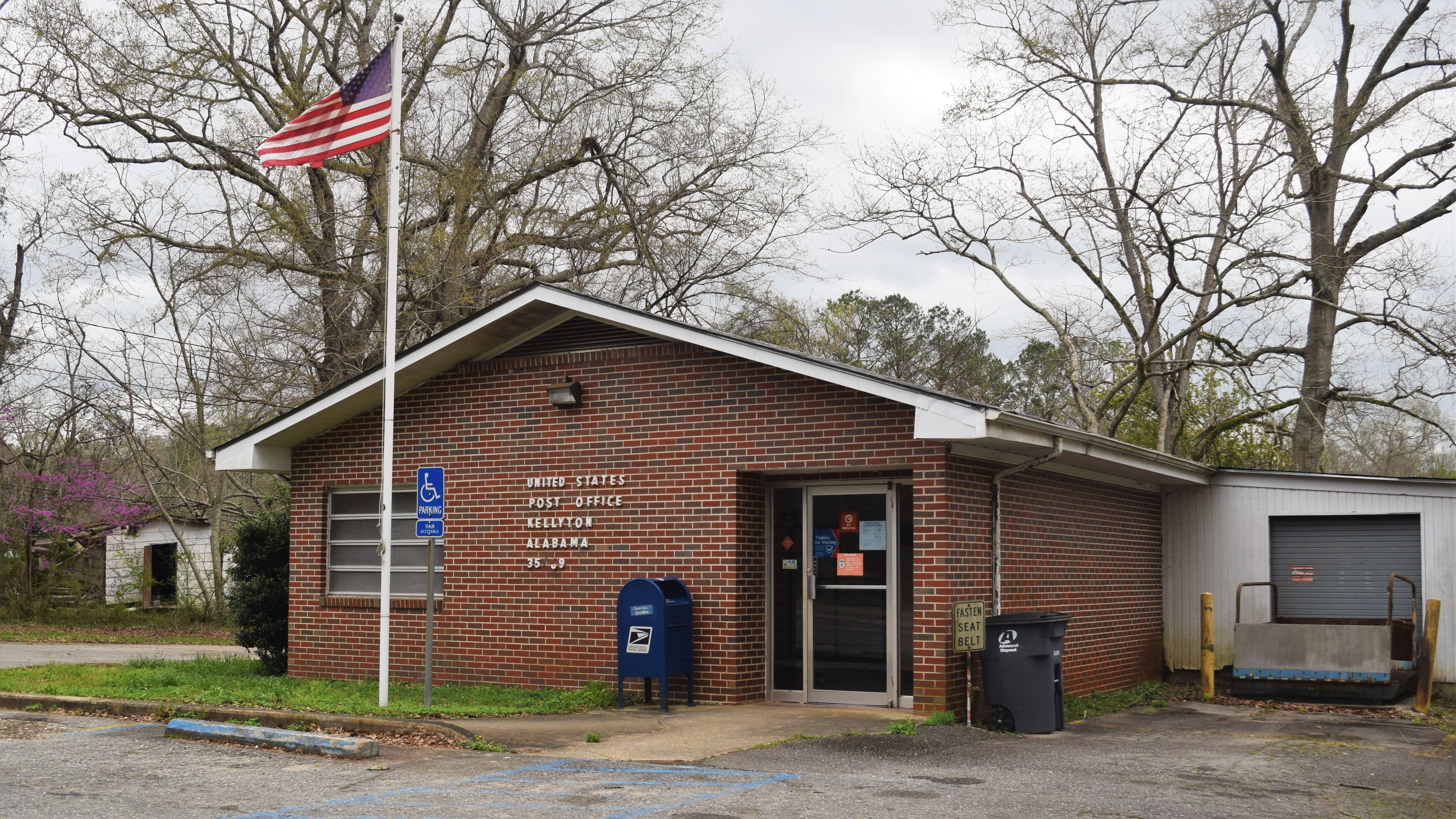
Kellyton Post Office (ZIP code: 35089)

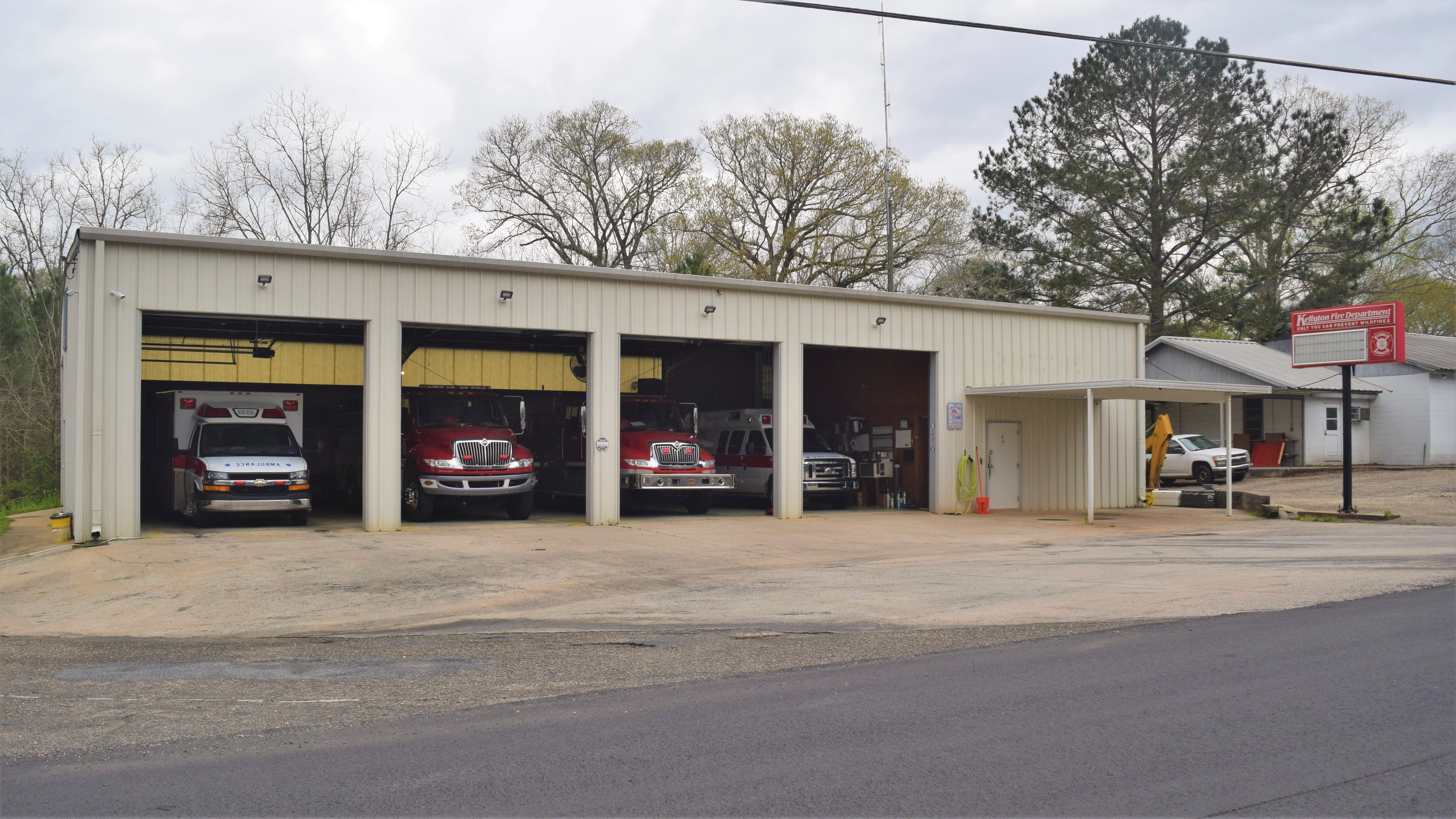
Kellyton Fire Department
