= Randolph, Alabama =

Unincorporated community in Alabama, United States

- Unincorporated community
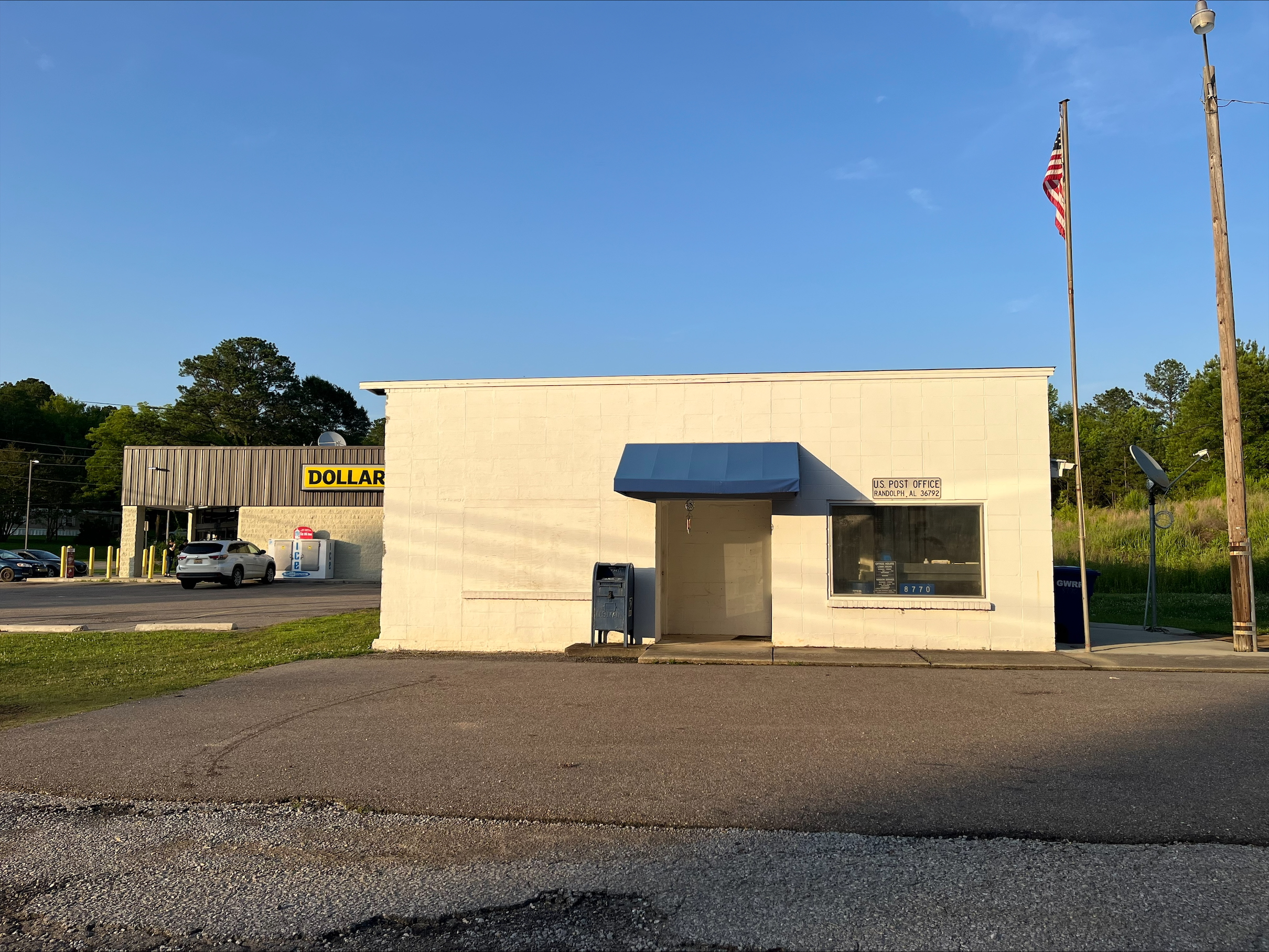
- Randolph Post Office

- Location within the state of Alabama Randolph, Alabama (the United States)
- Coordinates: 32°53′58″N 86°54′38″W
- Country: United States
- State: Alabama
- County: Bibb
- Elevation: 554 ft (169 m)

Population
  - Total: 1,169
- Time zone: UTC-6 (Central (CST))
  - Summer (DST): UTC-5 (CDT)
- ZIP code: 36792
- Area codes: 205, 659

Randolph is an unincorporated community in Bibb County, Alabama, United States. At the 2010 census, the population was 1,169.

== History ==
Randolph is likely named for Randolph County, North Carolina, where many of the community's early settlers moved from.

Randolph is located on the former Mobile and Ohio Railroad.

The community has a post office, with postmasters first appointed in 1839.

== Education ==
Randolph has an elementary school, serving students from kindergarten to 6th grade.
