= Rockford, Alabama =

Town in Alabama, US

- Town
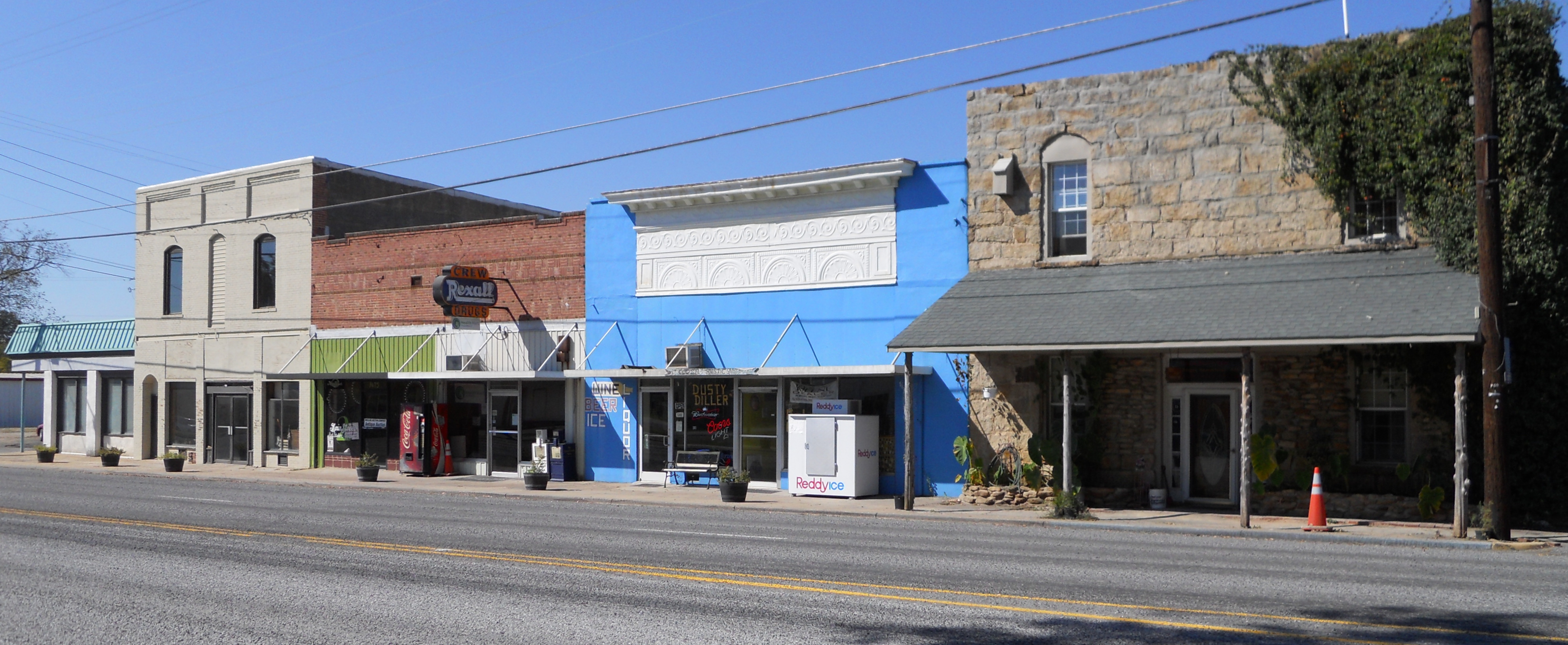
- Rockford, Alabama in 2011

- Location of Rockford in Coosa County, Alabama.
- Coordinates: 32°52′51″N 86°13′04″W
- Country: United States
- State: Alabama
- County: Coosa
- Settled: 1832

Area
  - Total: 3.32 sq mi (8.60 km^{2})
  - Land: 3.31 sq mi (8.57 km^{2})
  - Water: 0.012 sq mi (0.03 km^{2})
- Elevation: 725 ft (221 m)

Population (2020)
  - Total: 349
  - Density: 105.5/sq mi (40.74/km^{2})
- Time zone: UTC-6 (Central (CST))
  - Summer (DST): UTC-5 (CDT)
- ZIP code: 35136
- Area code: 256
- FIPS code: 01-65472
- GNIS feature ID: 2407230
- Website: www.rockfordalabama.net

Rockford is a town in Coosa County, Alabama, United States. At the 2020 census, the population was 349. The town is the county seat of Coosa County and is part of the Talladega-Sylacauga Micropolitan Statistical Area.

== History ==
Coosa County was created by an act of the Alabama State Legislature on December 18, 1832, and a site on Hatchet Creek was chosen as the county seat and given the name Lexington. In 1835 the name was changed to Rockford.

== Geography ==
The town is located in the central part of the state along U.S. Route 231, which runs south to north through the center of town, leading north 21 mi (34 km) to Sylacauga and south 28 mi (45 km) to Wetumpka. Alabama State Route 22 meets US 231 in the center of town, leading east 18 mi (29 km) to Alexander City and west 29 mi (47 km) to Clanton.

According to the U.S. Census Bureau, the town has a total area of 3.3 square miles (8.5 km^{2}) of which 3.3 square miles (8.5 km^{2}) is land and 0.30% is water.

Soils are mostly well drained sandy loam of the Wedowee series. Loams and silt loams of the Baden, Tallapoosa and Fruithurst series are common on the northern outskirts.

=== Climate ===
According to the Köppen climate classification, Rockford has a humid subtropical climate (abbreviated Cfa).

Climate data for Rockford, Alabama, 1991–2020 normals, extremes 1954–2016
Month	Jan	Feb	Mar	Apr	May	Jun	Jul	Aug	Sep	Oct	Nov	Dec	Year
Record high °F (°C)	80 (27)	82 (28)	87 (31)	90 (32)	98 (37)	102 (39)	103 (39)	107 (42)	101 (38)	98 (37)	87 (31)	79 (26)	107 (42)
Mean daily maximum °F (°C)	54.6 (12.6)	59.5 (15.3)	67.4 (19.7)	75.0 (23.9)	81.0 (27.2)	86.1 (30.1)	88.7 (31.5)	87.2 (30.7)	83.2 (28.4)	73.9 (23.3)	64.0 (17.8)	56.7 (13.7)	73.1 (22.8)
Daily mean °F (°C)	44.6 (7.0)	48.6 (9.2)	55.4 (13.0)	62.3 (16.8)	69.7 (20.9)	75.9 (24.4)	79.0 (26.1)	77.9 (25.5)	73.4 (23.0)	63.2 (17.3)	53.1 (11.7)	46.9 (8.3)	62.5 (16.9)
Mean daily minimum °F (°C)	34.6 (1.4)	37.7 (3.2)	43.4 (6.3)	49.6 (9.8)	58.3 (14.6)	65.6 (18.7)	69.2 (20.7)	68.7 (20.4)	63.7 (17.6)	52.5 (11.4)	42.2 (5.7)	37.1 (2.8)	51.9 (11.0)
Record low °F (°C)	−6 (−21)	6 (−14)	11 (−12)	24 (−4)	33 (1)	37 (3)	50 (10)	49 (9)	37 (3)	23 (−5)	12 (−11)	−4 (−20)	−6 (−21)
Average precipitation inches (mm)	5.72 (145)	5.79 (147)	5.93 (151)	5.19 (132)	4.78 (121)	4.54 (115)	5.33 (135)	5.07 (129)	3.79 (96)	3.60 (91)	4.97 (126)	5.48 (139)	60.19 (1,527)
Average snowfall inches (cm)	0.3 (0.76)	0.1 (0.25)	0.4 (1.0)	0.2 (0.51)	0.0 (0.0)	0.0 (0.0)	0.0 (0.0)	0.0 (0.0)	0.0 (0.0)	0.0 (0.0)	0.0 (0.0)	trace	1.0 (2.5)
Average precipitation days (≥ 0.01 in)	9.4	10.1	8.6	8.1	8.2	9.2	11.1	10.4	6.2	6.1	6.9	9.8	104.1
Average snowy days (≥ 0.1 in)	0.2	0.1	0.1	0.0	0.0	0.0	0.0	0.0	0.0	0.0	0.0	0.1	0.5
Source 1: NOAA (snow/snow days 1981–2010)
Source 2: National Weather Service

== Demographics ==
Historical population
Census	Pop.	Note	%±
1850	171		—
1890	240		—
1920	274		—
1930	320		16.8%
1940	394		23.1%
1950	373		−5.3%
1960	328		−12.1%
1970	603		83.8%
1980	494		−18.1%
1990	461		−6.7%
2000	428		−7.2%
2010	477		11.4%
2020	349		−26.8%
U.S. Decennial Census; 2013 Estimate

=== 2020 census ===
Rockford racial composition
Race	Num.	Perc.
White (non-Hispanic)	254	72.78%
Black or African American (non-Hispanic)	75	21.49%
Other/Mixed	17	4.87%
Hispanic or Latino	3	0.86%

As of the 2020 United States census, there were 349 people, 261 households, and 164 families residing in the town.

=== 2000 census ===
As of the census of 2000, there were 428 people, 189 households, and 113 families residing in the town. The population density was 129.6 inhabitants per square mile (50.0/km^{2}). There were 226 housing units at an average density of 68.5 per square mile (26.4/km^{2}). The racial makeup of the town was 65.65% White, 32.48% Black or African American, 0.23% Pacific Islander, and 1.64% from two or more races. 1.17% of the population were Hispanic or Latino of any race.

There were 189 households, out of which 32.8% had children under the age of 18 living with them, 34.9% were married couples living together, 19.0% had a female householder with no husband present, and 40.2% were non-families. 38.6% of all households were made up of individuals, and 22.8% had someone living alone who was 65 years of age or older. The average household size was 2.13 and the average family size was 2.81.

In the town, the population was spread out, with 24.5% under the age of 18, 7.7% from 18 to 24, 29.0% from 25 to 44, 18.5% from 45 to 64, and 20.3% who were 65 years of age or older. The median age was 39 years. For every 100 females, there were 91.9 males. For every 100 females age 18 and over, there were 84.6 males.

The median income for a household in the town was $20,000, and the median income for a family was $32,125. Males had a median income of $30,000 versus $17,031 for females. The per capita income for the town was $13,350. About 24.3% of families and 24.5% of the population were below the poverty line, including 27.6% of those under age 18 and 16.3% of those age 65 or over.

== Education ==
Public education in Rockford is provided by the Coosa County School District. There are four schools located in Rockford: Central High School (grades 9 through 12), Central Middle School (grades 5 through 8), Central Elementary School (grades (K through 4), and Coosa County Science and Technology Center (grades 9 through 12).

== Fred the Town Dog ==
In 1993, a sick and bedraggled dog wandered into Rockford. The animal was called "Fred" and was nursed back to health by town residents. For the next ten years, Fred was the town mascot.

Fred gained popularity through a regular newspaper column, "A Dog's Life," about his activities and encounters, and then national recognition after he was profiled on cable TV's Animal Planet.

Fred died on December 23, 2002, in a Birmingham animal hospital, from a mysterious animal bite. He was buried behind the town's old jailhouse. A full-size grave marker, donated by a Montgomery businessman, was added in May 2003. Fred was inducted into the Alabama Veterinary Medical Association Animal Hall of Fame in 2004.

In 2014, the story was turned into a short film documentary titled Fred: The Town Dog.

== Gallery ==
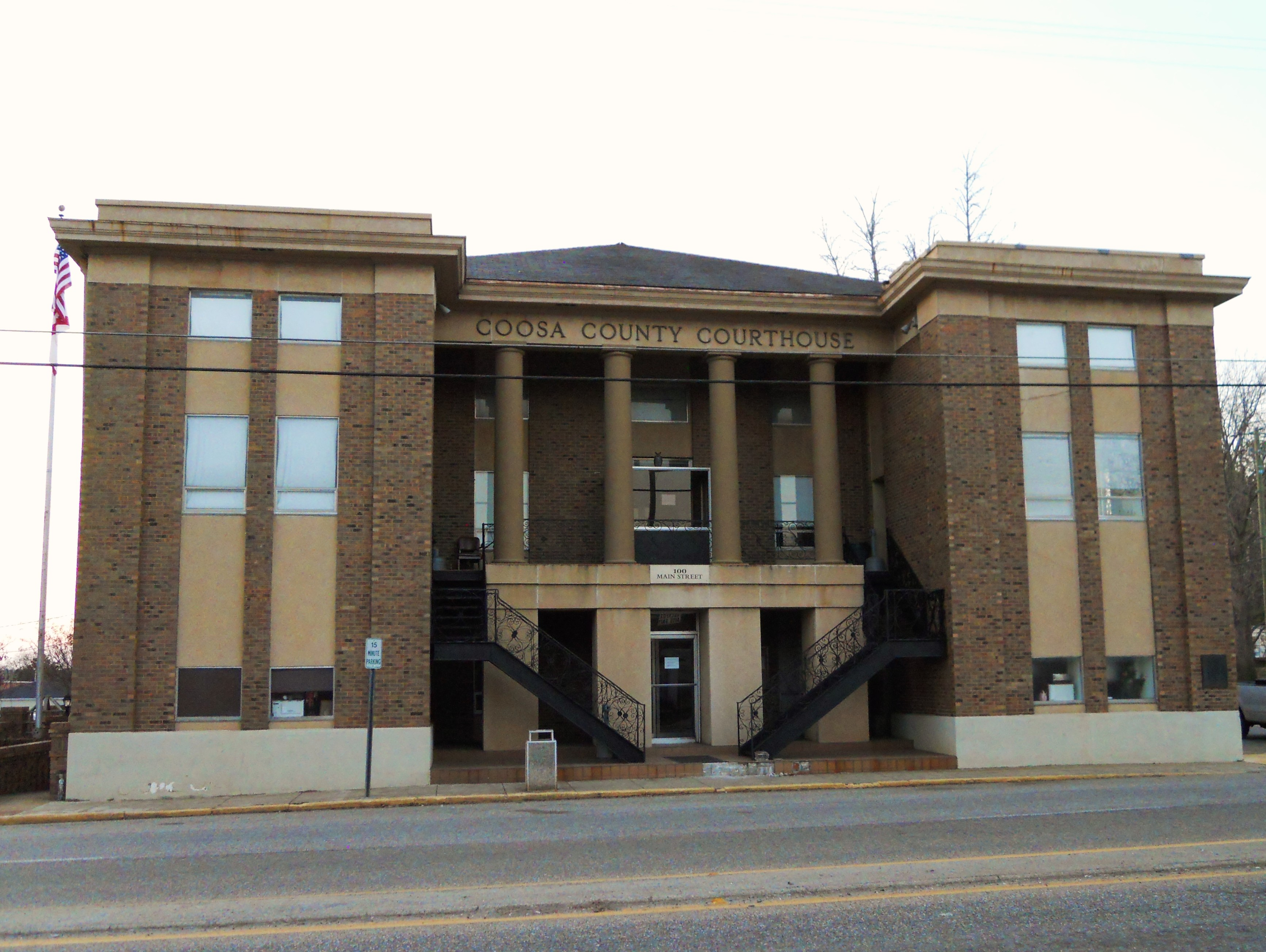
The Coosa County Courthouse is located in Rockford which is the county seat of Coosa County.

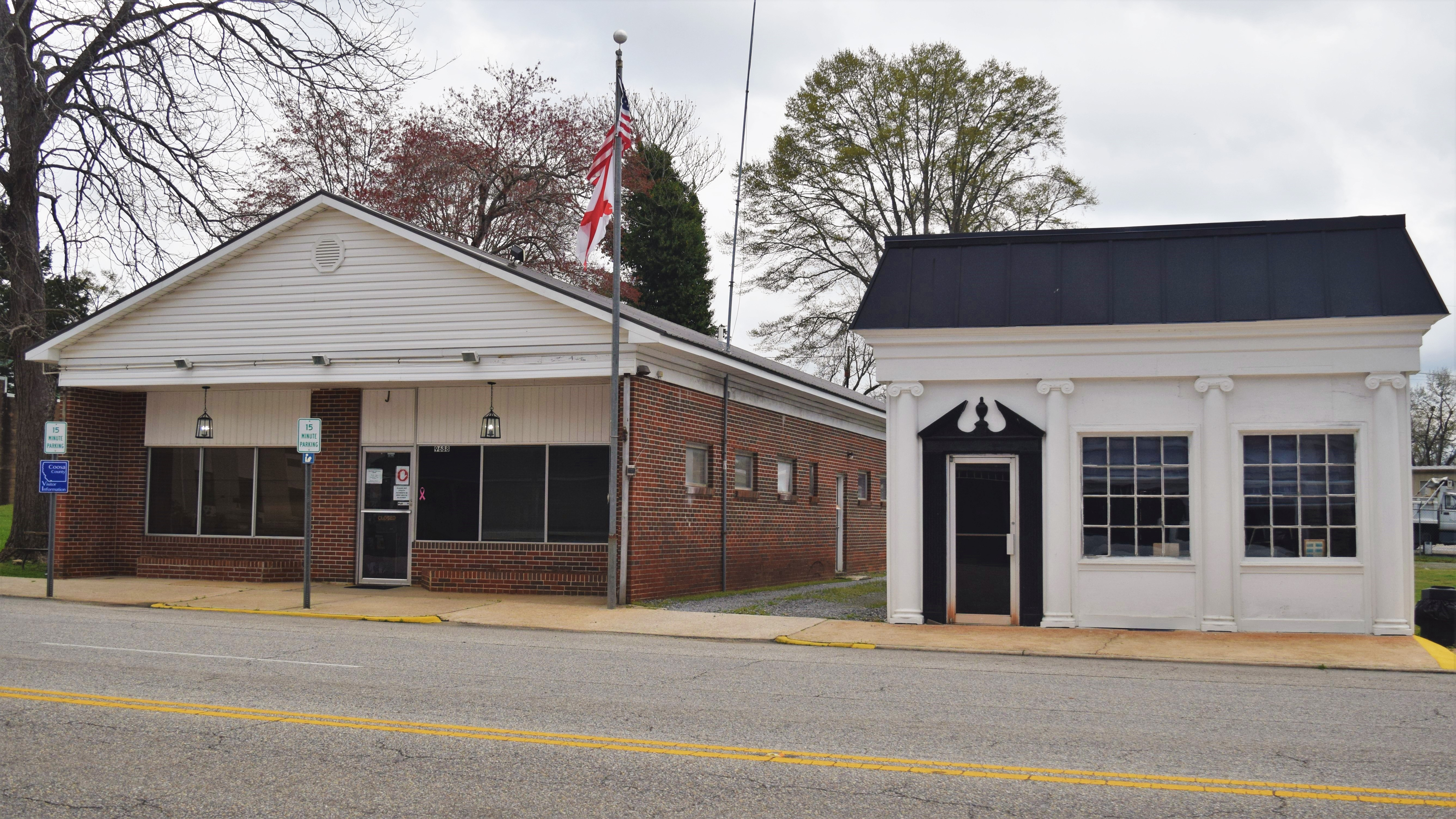
Rockford Town Hall

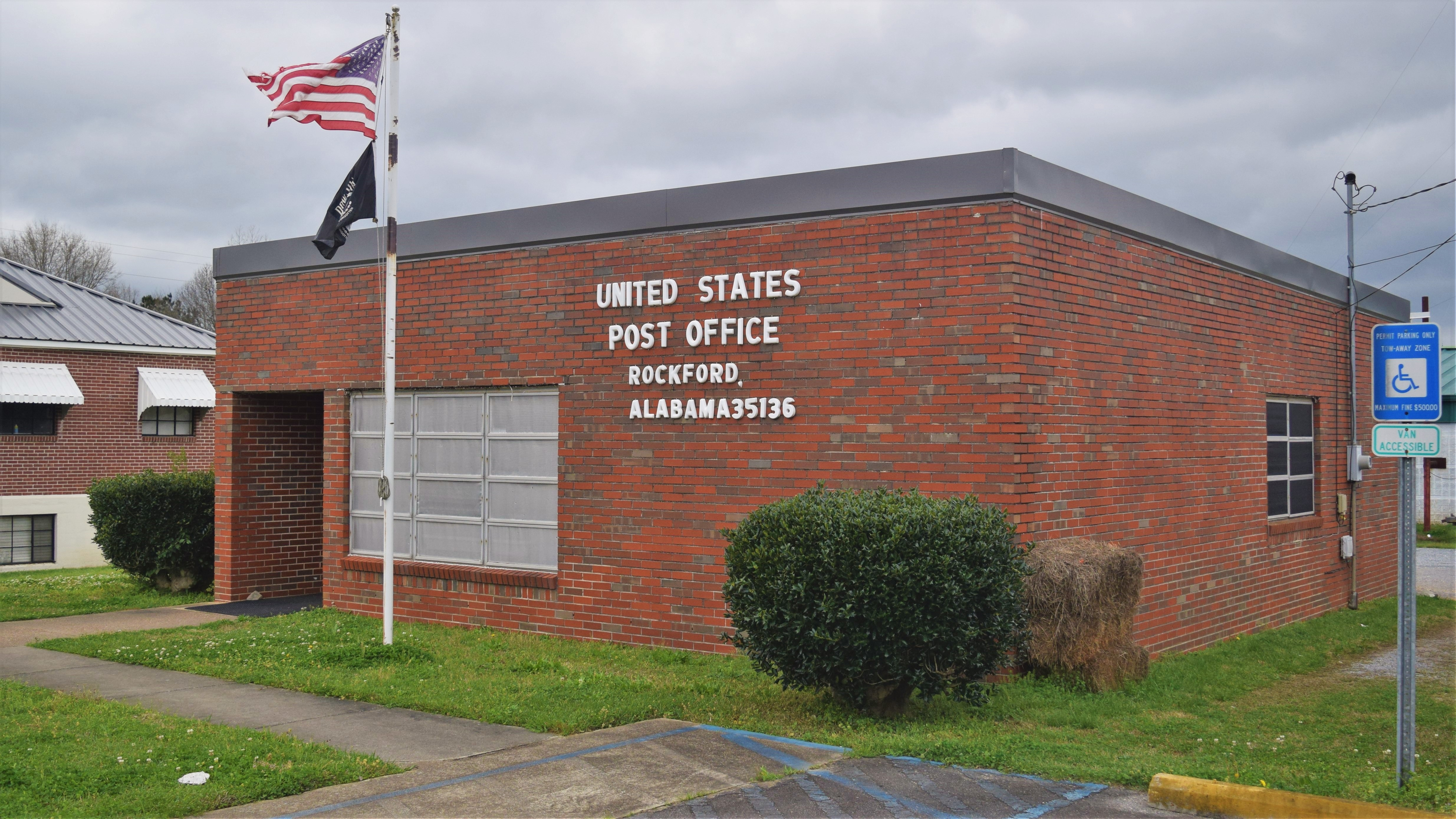
Rockford Post Office (ZIP code: 35136)

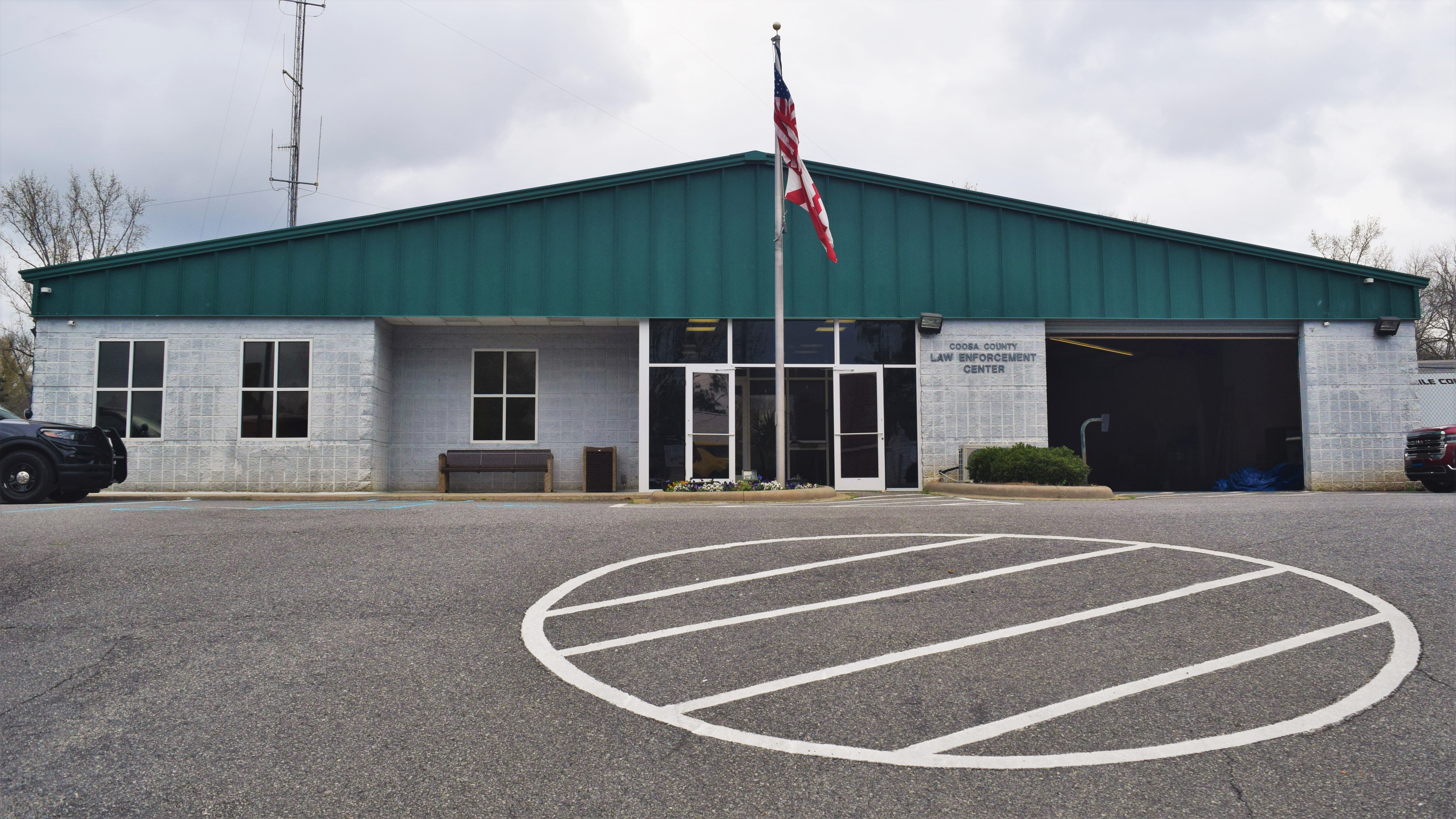
The Coosa County Law Enforcement Center located in Rockford.

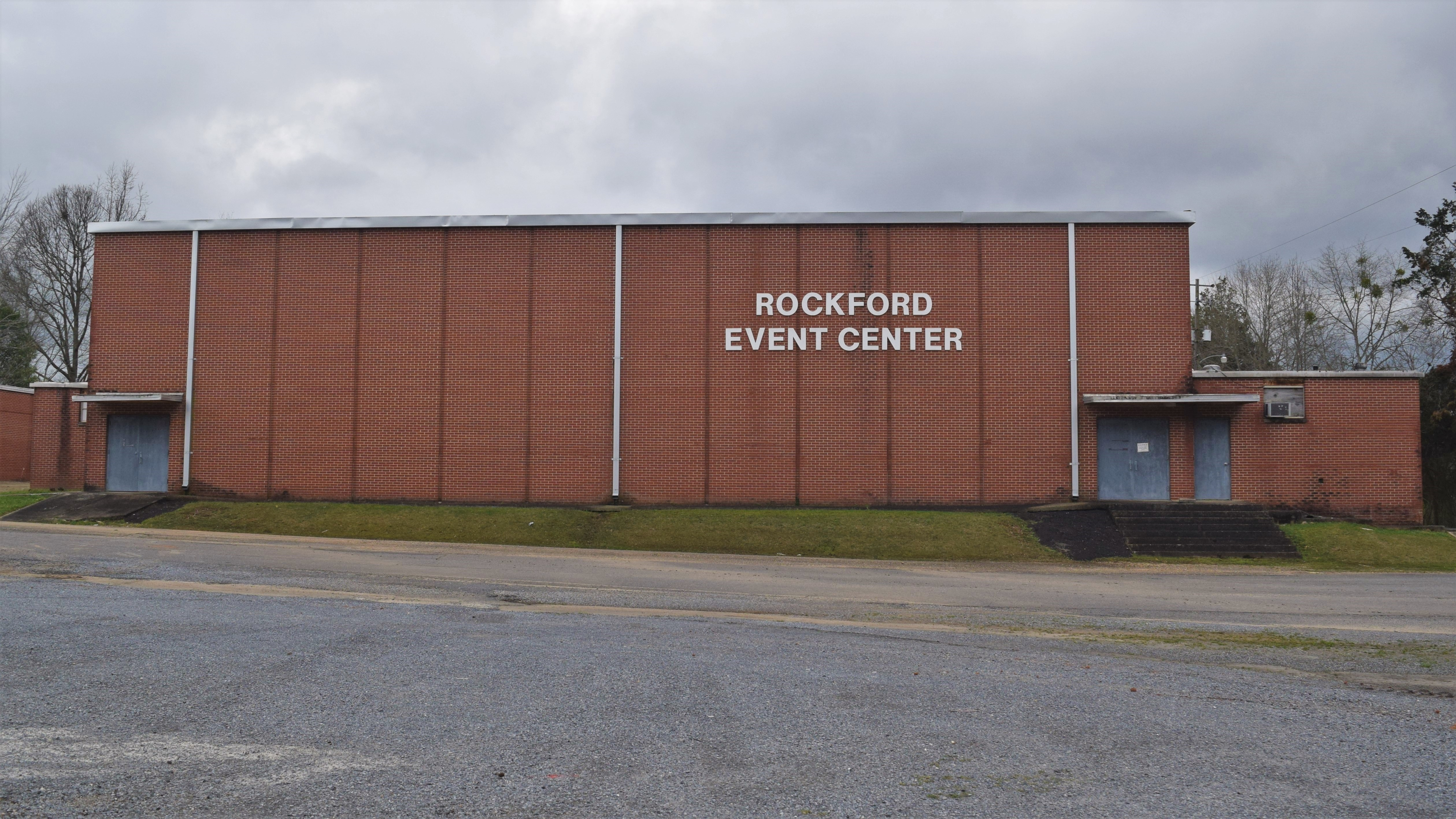
The Rockford Event Center

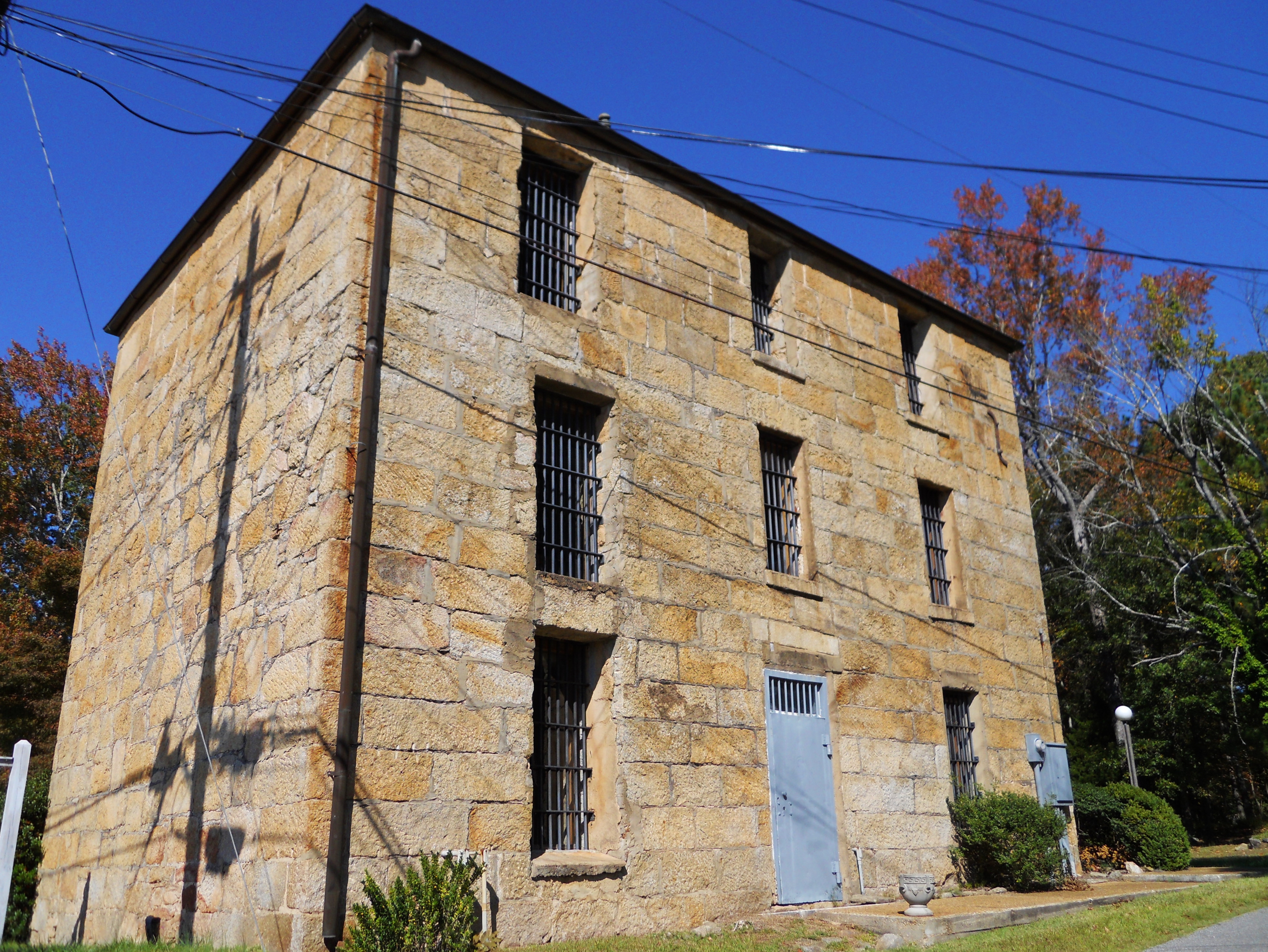
The old Coosa County Jailhouse is located in Rockford. It was added to the National Register of Historic Places on June 20, 1974.

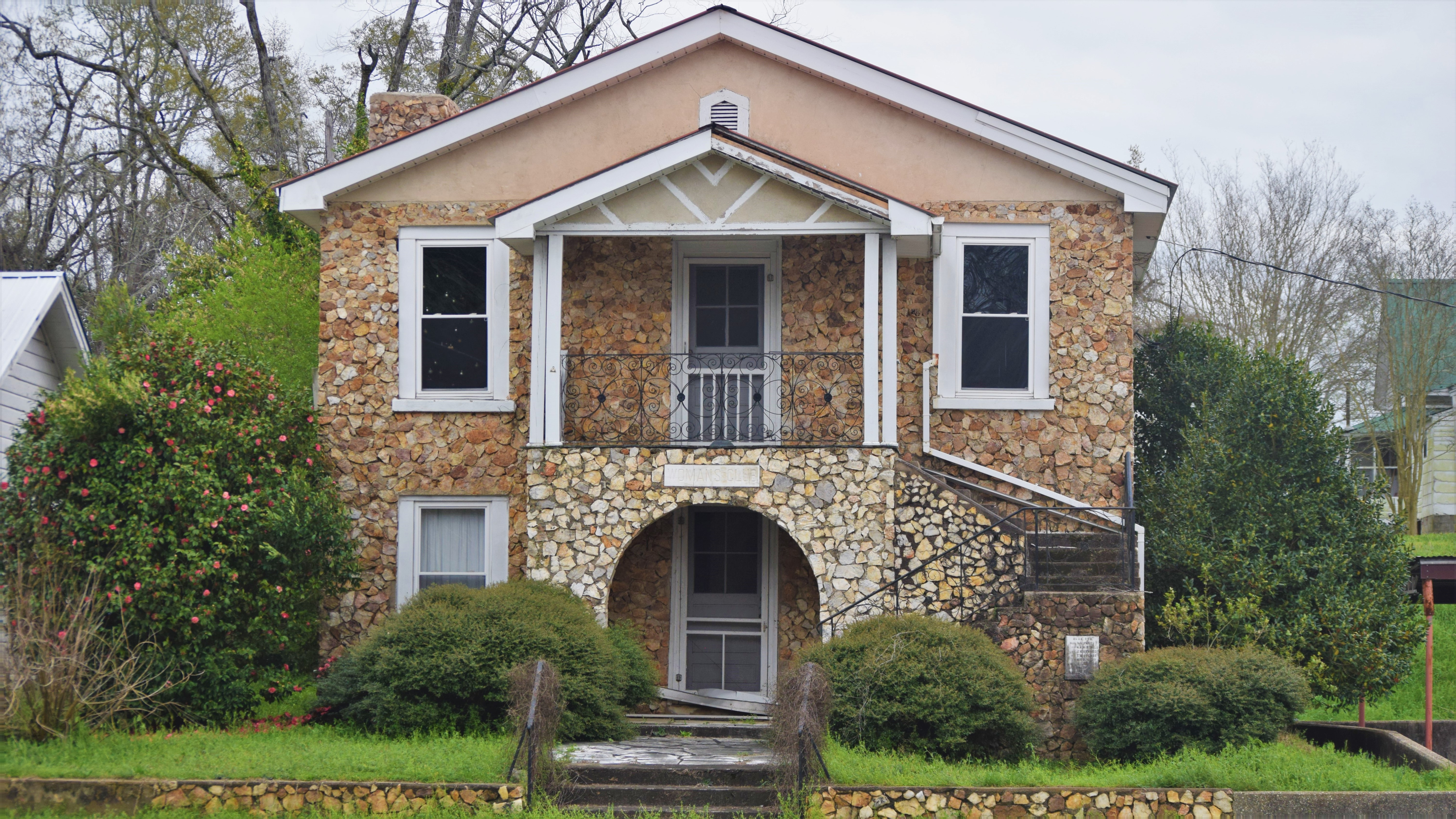
The Rockford Women's Club House was built in 1932 and added to the Alabama Register of Landmarks and Heritage on March 13, 1996.

== Notable people ==
- James K. Parsons, major general in the United States Army who received the Distinguished Service Cross for heroism in World War I
