= National Register of Historic Places listings in Shelby County, Alabama =

Location of Shelby County in Alabama

This is a list of the National Register of Historic Places listings in Shelby County, Alabama.

This is intended to be a complete list of the properties and districts on the National Register of Historic Places in Shelby County, Alabama, United States. Latitude and longitude coordinates are provided for many National Register properties and districts; these locations may be seen together in an online map.

There are 12 properties and districts listed on the National Register in the county.

This National Park Service list is complete through NPS recent listings posted January 30, 2026.

	Name on the Register	Image	Date listed	Location	City or town	Description
1	Calera Downtown Historic District	Calera Downtown Historic District	March 29, 2006 (#06000188)	Junction of U.S. Route 31 and State Route 25; 33°06′01″N 86°45′09″W	Calera	
2	Chancellor House	Chancellor House	October 29, 2001 (#01001168)	51 Chancellor Ferry Rd. 33°17′47″N 86°23′57″W	Harpersville	
3	Columbiana City Hall	Columbiana City Hall	October 29, 1974 (#74000437)	107 Mildred St. 33°10′38″N 86°36′26″W	Columbiana	Also known as the Old Shelby County Courthouse
4	Downtown Montevallo Historic District	Downtown Montevallo Historic District	April 23, 2013 (#13000180)	555-925 Main, 710-745 Middle & 608 Valley Sts. 33°06′03″N 86°51′46″W	Montevallo	
5	Farrington Hall	Farrington Hall	July 21, 2015 (#15000434)	124 Cty. Rd. 203; 33°06′29″N 86°53′38″W	Montevallo vicinity	
6	Helena Historic District	Helena Historic District	April 18, 2006 (#06000278)	Parts of State Route 261 and Helena Rd., parts of 1st-3rd Ave., and the 200 block of 3rd St. 33°17′45″N 86°50′41″W	Helena	"Old Town" Helena during a rare snowfall in January 2008. These buildings date to the late 19th century.
7	King House	King House	January 14, 1972 (#72000179)	University of Montevallo campus 33°06′18″N 86°51′47″W	Montevallo	
8	McKibbon House	McKibbon House	December 31, 2001 (#01001408)	611 E. Boundary St. 33°05′51″N 86°51′42″W	Montevallo	
9	Old Rock House	Old Rock House	March 29, 2006 (#06000182)	1 mile southeast of Harpersville at the end of a farm lane on the northern side of U.S. Route 280; 33°19′49″N 86°24′27″W	Harpersville	
10	Shoal Creek Club		December 8, 2022 (#100008439)	100 New Williamsburg Dr. 33°26′19″N 86°36′49″W	Shoal Creek	
11	University of Montevallo Historic District	University of Montevallo Historic District	December 11, 1978 (#78000509)	Bounded by Middle Campus Dr., Oak, Bloch and Middle Sts.; also roughly bounded by Bloch St., Farmer St., Flowerhill Dr., King St., Valley St., and Middle St. 33°06′10″N 86°51′57″W	Montevallo	Originally listed in 1978 as Alabama Girls' Industrial School, expanded and renamed University of Montevallo Historic District in 1990.
12	Wallace House		June 17, 2025 (#100011941)	35184 Highway 25; 33°17′05″N 86°26′58″W	Harpersville	

== See also ==
- List of National Historic Landmarks in Alabama
- National Register of Historic Places listings in Alabama
