= Cahaba =

Cahaba may refer to:

== Places ==
- The Cahaba River in Alabama
- Cahaba River National Wildlife Refuge
- Cahaba River Wildlife Management Area
- Cahaba Basin, is a geologic area of central Alabama
- Cahaba, Alabama (or Cahawba), a ghost town in, and the former capital of, Alabama
- Cahaba Prison (or Cahawba Prison), a Confederate prison
- Cahawba County (see Bibb County, Alabama)
- Cahaba Heights, Vestavia Hills a neighborhood of Vestavia Hills, Jefferson County, Alabama, United States

== Flora ==
- Cahaba lily, an aquatic, perennial flowering plant species
- Old Cahaba rosinweed, Silphium perplexum
- Cahaba torch, Liatris oligocephala

== Fauna ==
- Cahaba shiner, a rare species of cyprinid fish
- Cahaba pebblesnail, a species of very small freshwater snail
- Cahawba elimia, a species of freshwater snail

== Artifacts ==
- Cahaba, Marion and Greensboro Railroad
- USS Cahaba (AO-82), an Escambia-class replenishment oiler
