= Abbot Springs, Alabama =

- Unincorporated community
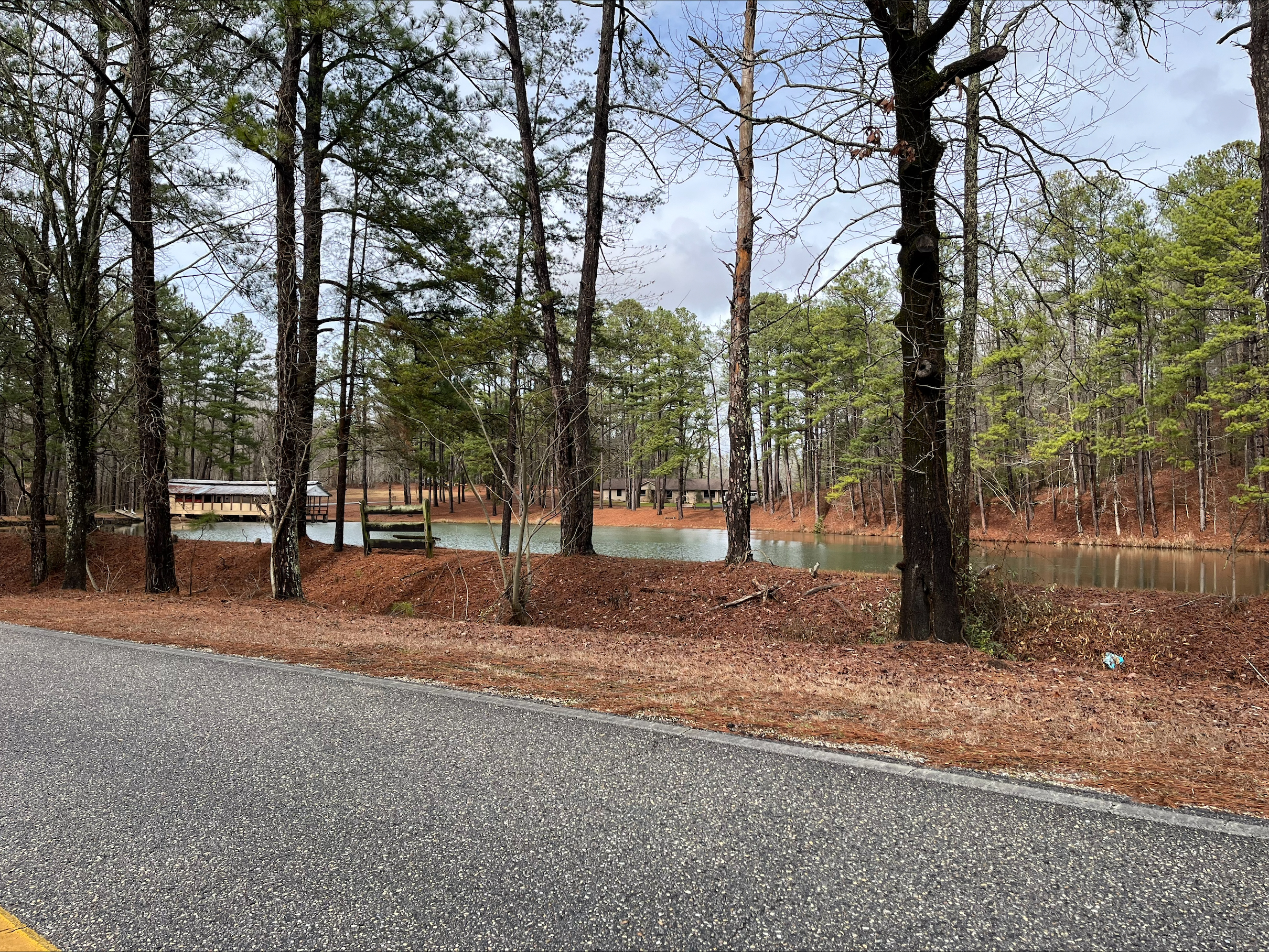
- One of the springs at Abbot Springs

- Location within Alabama Location within the United States
- Coordinates: 33°21′39″N 86°28′54″W
- Country: United States
- State: Alabama
- County: Shelby
- Elevation: 492 ft (150 m)
- Time zone: UTC−6 (Central (CST))
  - Summer (DST): UTC−5 (CDT)
- ZIP code: 35147
- Area codes: 205, 659
- GNIS feature ID: 155974

Abbot Springs is a settlement in Shelby County, Alabama, United States. While the community was once unincorporated, it is now part of eastern Westover. It lies less than 3 miles away from the town of Harpersville. It runs along a branch of Old Highway 280.

== Demographics ==
According to the census returns from 1850-2010 for Alabama, it has never reported a population figure separately on the U.S. Census.
