= Pea Ridge, Shelby County, Alabama =

Pea Ridge, Alabama
- Census-designated place
- Location within Alabama Location within the United States
- Coordinates: 33°08′11″N 86°56′23″W
- Country: United States
- State: Alabama
- County: Shelby

Area
  - Total: 15.69 sq mi (40.64 km^{2})
  - Land: 15.64 sq mi (40.52 km^{2})
  - Water: 0.046 sq mi (0.12 km^{2})
- Elevation: 784 ft (239 m)

Population (2020)
  - Total: 841
  - Density: 53.8/sq mi (20.76/km^{2})
- Time zone: UTC-6 (Central (CST))
  - Summer (DST): UTC-5 (CDT)
- Area codes: 205, 659
- GNIS feature ID: 2805895

Pea Ridge is a census-designated place in Shelby County, Alabama, United States. The community is named for Pea Ridge, the broadest ridge in the Cahaba Coal Field. This ridge divides the waters of the Cahaba River and Little Cahaba River. Pea Ridge has maintained a volunteer fire department since 1972.

It was first named as a CDP in the 2020 Census which listed a population of 841.

== Demographics ==
Historical population
Census	Pop.	Note	%±
2020	841		—
U.S. Decennial Census; 2020

Pea Ridge CDP, Alabama – Racial and ethnic composition Note: the US Census treats Hispanic/Latino as an ethnic category. This table excludes Latinos from the racial categories and assigns them to a separate category. Hispanics/Latinos may be of any race.
Race / Ethnicity (NH = Non-Hispanic)	Pop 2020	2020
White alone (NH)	199	90.05%
Black or African American alone (NH)	4	1.81%
Native American or Alaska Native alone (NH)	0	0.00%
Asian alone (NH)	0	0.00%
Native Hawaiian or Pacific Islander alone (NH)	0	0.00%
Other race alone (NH)	0	0.00%
Mixed race or Multiracial (NH)	3	1.36%
Hispanic or Latino (any race)	15	6.79%
Total	221	100.00%
