= Inverness, Alabama =

Inverness, Alabama, may refer to one of the two following locations:

- Inverness, Bullock County, Alabama
- Inverness, Shelby County, Alabama
