= McKibbon =

McKibbon may refer to:

== People with the surname ==
- Al McKibbon (1919-2005), American jazz player
- Ox McKibbon, American college football player

== Places ==
- McKibbon House, historic house in Montevallo, Alabama, U.S.
