= Old Shelby County Courthouse =

- Columbiana City Hall
- U.S. National Register of Historic Places
- Alabama Register of Landmarks and Heritage
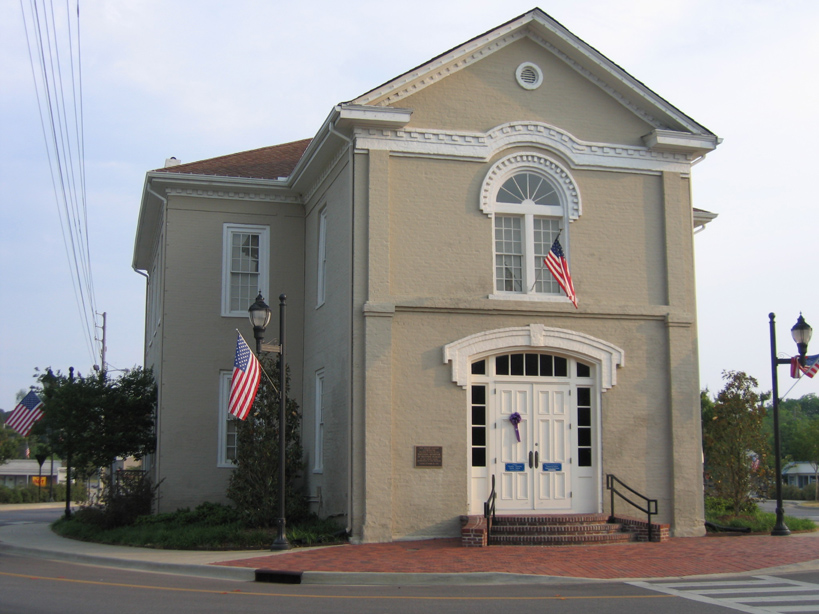
- Location: Main St., Columbiana, Alabama
- Coordinates: 33°10′38″N 86°36′26″W
- Built: 1854
- Architect: McCan & Williamson
- NRHP reference No.: 74000437

Significant dates
- Added to NRHP: October 29, 1974
- Designated ARLH: January 25, 2011

The Old Shelby County Courthouse, also known as Columbiana City Hall, is a defunct courthouse in Columbiana, Alabama. It was built in 1854. It served as the courthouse for Shelby County until 1906 when a larger court facility was built. It also served as Columbiana's city hall. Since 1982, it has housed the Shelby County Museum and Archives and its operator, the Shelby County Historical Society.

It was listed on the National Register of Historic Places on October 29, 1974. It was subsequently listed on the Alabama Register of Landmarks and Heritage on January 25, 2011.

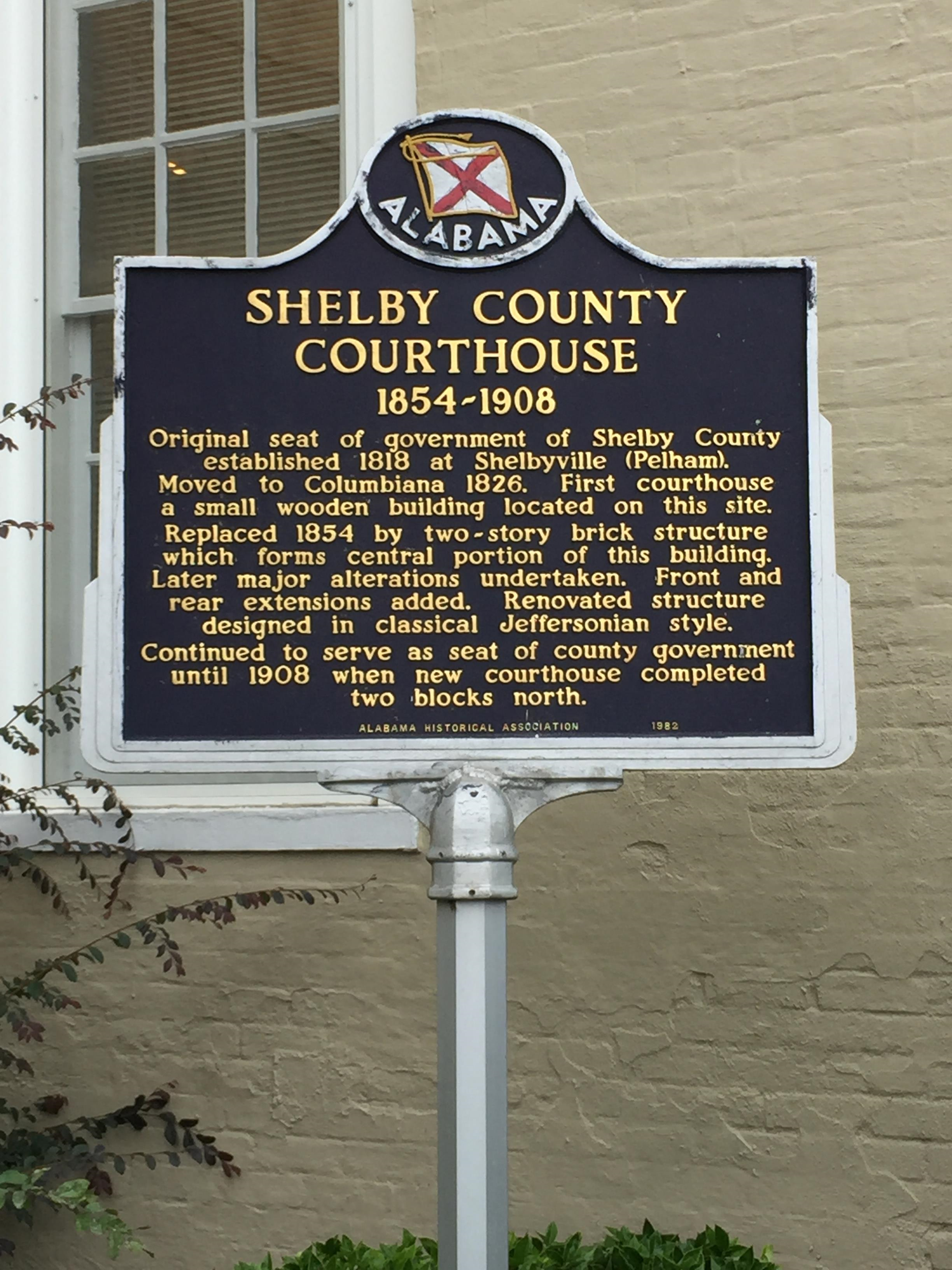
Shelby County Courthouse Historical Marker

In 1826, Columbiana, Alabama won an election against Montevallo, Alabama to house the courthouse. The people of Columbiana threw a huge celebration which involved the destruction of a tree sitting in the very spot they planned to move and build the courthouse. To destroy the tree, gunpowder was packed into holes that had been drilled into the tree. Once ignited, the blast was said to have been heard for miles. The wood building which was built following this celebration no longer stands and was replaced with the Old Shelby County Courthouse in 1854.

== See also ==
- List of county courthouses in Alabama
- National Register of Historic Places listings in Shelby County, Alabama
