= Cahaba Basin =

Geologic area of central Alabama, US

Coordinates: 33°0′37.41″N 87°6′52.36″W

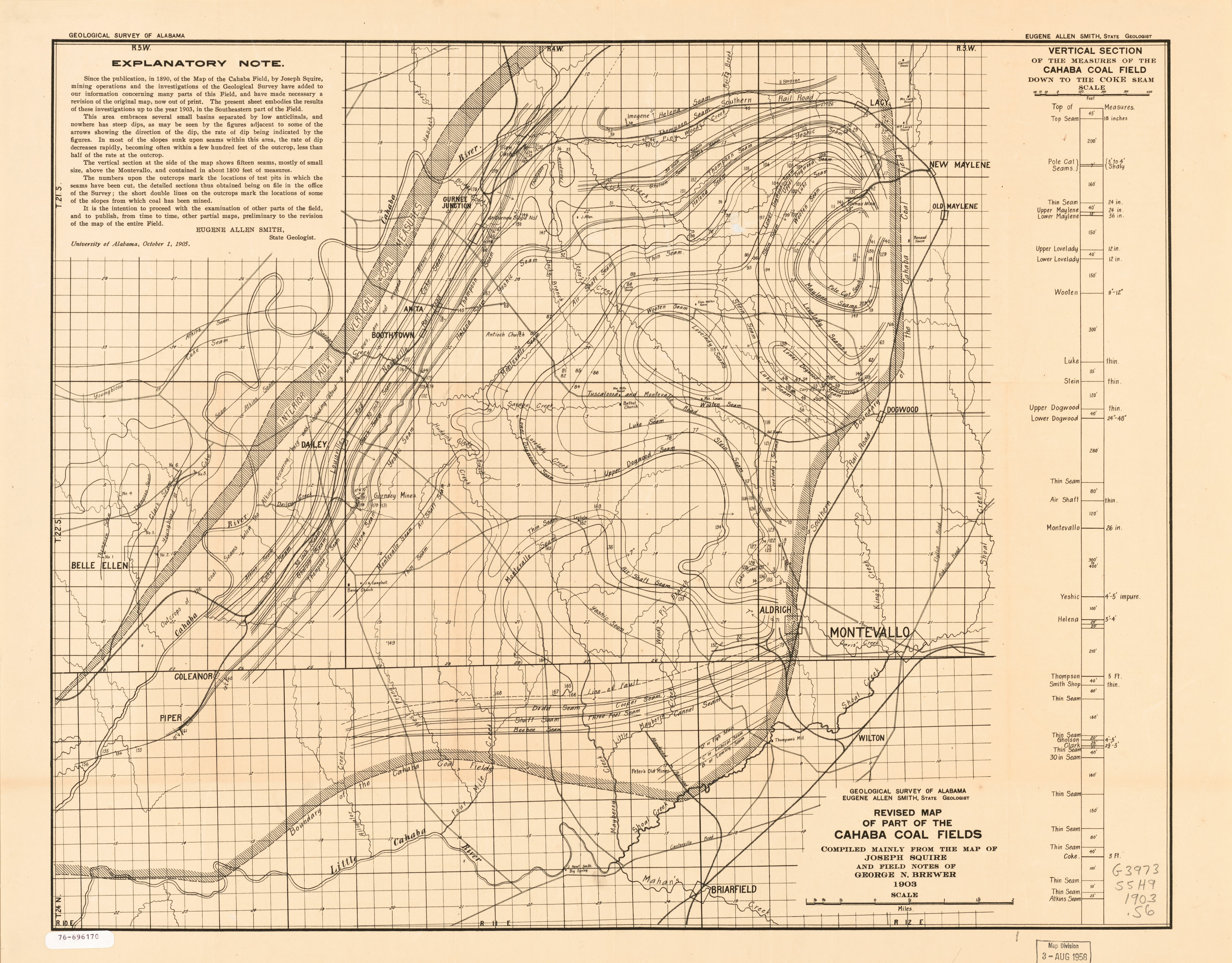
Revised map of the Cahaba coal fields, 1905

The Cahaba Basin is a geologic area of central Alabama developed for coal and coalbed methane (CBM) production. Centered in eastern Bibb and southwestern Shelby Counties, the basin is significantly smaller in area and production than the larger Black Warrior Basin in Tuscaloosa and western Jefferson Counties to the northwest. The coalbed methane is produced from the Gurnee Field of the Pottsville Coal Interval. Coalbed gas production has been continuous since at least 1990 and annual gas production has increased from 344,875 Mcf in 1990 to 3,154, 554 Mcf through October 2007.

== Geology ==
The Cahaba Basin is located across an anticline from the neighboring Black Warrior Basin. Within the Cahaba Basin, the Pennsylvanian age coal beds have an average bed thickness of 50 feet (15 m). The developed formations are known as the Gurnee Field of the Pottsville Formation.

== Development ==
The coal resources of the Cahaba Basin have been developed for over a century and contributed to the Birmingham area's rise as an iron and steel production center. Numerous small coal mines continue to operate in the basin. Several CBM developers operate within the Cahaba Basin with GeoMet, Inc. and CDX Gas being two of the largest. The field has been developed for CBM since the 1980s. GeoMet, Inc. and CDX both operate pipelines which join the SONAT Bessemer Calera Pipeline and Enbridge Pipeline respectively. GeoMet, Inc. operates a discharge water pipeline to the Black Warrior River.
