= Shelby County, Alabama =

County in Alabama, United States

- County
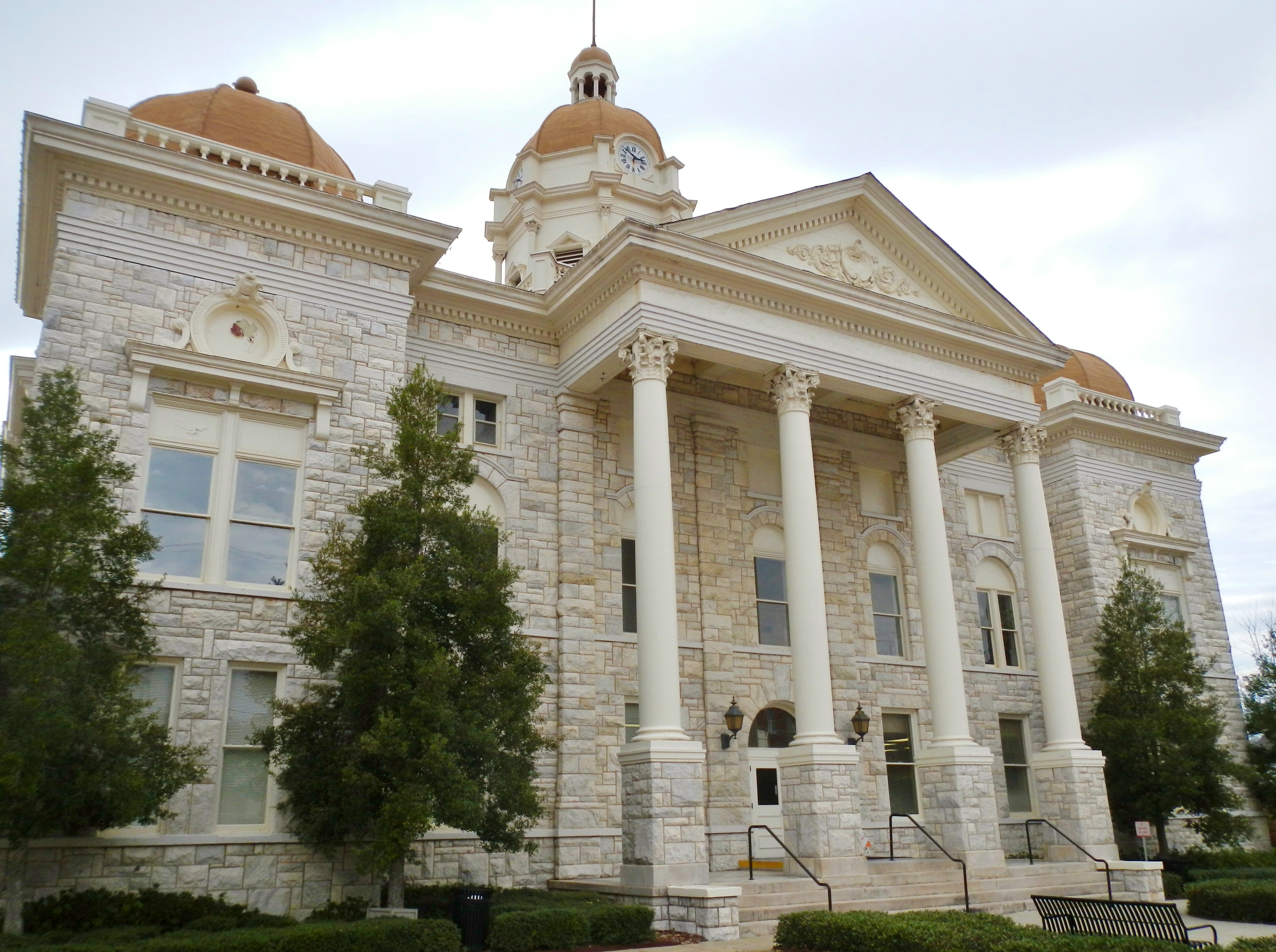
- Shelby County Courthouse in Columbiana

- Seal

- Location within the U.S. state of Alabama
- Coordinates: 33°15′55″N 86°40′04″W
- Country: United States
- State: Alabama
- Founded: February 7, 1818
- Named for: Isaac Shelby
- Seat: Columbiana
- Largest city: Alabaster

Area
  - Total: 810 sq mi (2,100 km^{2})
  - Land: 785 sq mi (2,030 km^{2})
  - Water: 25 sq mi (65 km^{2}) 3.0%

Population (2020)
  - Total: 223,024
  - Estimate (2025): 238,552 ▲
  - Density: 284/sq mi (110/km^{2})
- Time zone: UTC−6 (Central)
  - Summer (DST): UTC−5 (CDT)
- Congressional district: 6th
- Website: www.shelbyal.com
- County Number 58 on Alabama License Plates; Largest County by population not shuffled to top 06 on Alabama License Plates

Shelby County is a county located in the central portion of the U.S. state of Alabama. As of the 2020 census the population was 223,024, making it the sixth-most populous county in Alabama. The county seat is Columbiana. Its largest city is Alabaster. The county is named in honor of Isaac Shelby, Governor of Kentucky from 1792 to 1796 and again from 1812 to 1816. Shelby County is included in the Birmingham, AL Metropolitan Statistical Area.

== History ==
Shelby County was established on February 7, 1818, and it was named for the Revolutionary War hero and the first Governor of Kentucky, Isaac Shelby. Beginning in 1820, the first county seat was located at Shelbyville. This long defunct settlement was located within the modern city limits of Pelham. The first courthouse was built of logs. The seat was moved to Columbia, now Columbiana, in 1826. Initially housed in an old school building, a new brick courthouse building was completed in 1854. It is now known as the Old Shelby County Courthouse and houses the Shelby County Museum and Archives. The current limestone courthouse was built from 1905 to 1906, at a cost of $300,000.

Shelby County has a long history in agriculture, and since about 1990, it has become an important location for growing soybeans, which has exceeded cotton as the most important crop grown there.

Shelby County was the home of an early inland waterway, the Coosa River, and it was also the location of a very early east–west railroad in Alabama that connected Atlanta, Georgia, with locations to its west. Shelby County was also crossed by an early north–south railroad, the Louisville and Nashville Railroad, that connected Louisville, Nashville, Decatur, Birmingham, and Montgomery.

With the advent of the automobile and the truck, Shelby County was soon crossed from north to south by U.S. Highway 31, the major one that followed the same route as the Louisville and Nashville Railroad did. (All odd-numbered U.S. Highways are north–south routes: e.g. U.S. 1, 11, 21, 31, 41, 51, 61, and 71, 101, going from East to West) The eastern part of Shelby County was later crossed by U.S. Highway 231 and U.S. 280.

Decades later, Shelby County was crossed by Interstate Highway 65. Hence, an important ingredient in the eventual growth of Shelby County has been its ready access to modern systems of transportation. Interstate 65 and U.S. Highway 31 have long provided strong connections between Shelby county and the more populous Jefferson County directly to its north, leading to suburban development in towns such as Pelham, Helena, Alabaster, and Chelsea.

== Geography ==
According to the United States Census Bureau, the county has a total area of 810 square miles (2,100 km^{2}), of which 785 square miles (2,030 km^{2}) is land and 25 square miles (65 km^{2}) (3.0%) is water.

Parts of Shelby County are crossed by the southernmost extensions of the Appalachian Mountains, such as Oak Mountain and Double Oak Mountain. However, large parts of Shelby County are much flatter, giving good land for farms and pastures. Shelby County also has lowlands along two rivers, and one large man-made reservoir, Lay Lake, which also borders Coosa, Talladega and Chilton counties.

Most of Shelby County is drained either by the Cahaba River, which flows along the northern edge of the county, and then to the southwest, or by the Coosa River, whose valley includes the eastern end of the county. These are both important rivers in Alabama. Much farther south, both the Cahaba River and the Coosa River flow into the Alabama River, and thence to the Gulf of Mexico. To be more precise, the Coosa River and the Tallapoosa River flow together at Wetumpka, Alabama, to form the Alabama River, and then the Cahaba River is a tributary to that one farther to the west. Waxahatchee Creek, a major tributary of the Coosa River, forms the southeastern portion of the border between Shelby County and Chilton County.

=== Adjacent counties ===
- St. Clair County (northeast)
- Talladega County (east)
- Coosa County (southeast)
- Chilton County (south)
- Bibb County (southwest)
- Jefferson County (northwest)

== Demographics ==
Historical population
Census	Pop.	Note	%±
1820	2,416		—
1830	5,704		136.1%
1840	6,112		7.2%
1850	9,536		56.0%
1860	12,618		32.3%
1870	12,218		−3.2%
1880	17,236		41.1%
1890	20,886		21.2%
1900	23,684		13.4%
1910	26,949		13.8%
1920	27,097		0.5%
1930	27,576		1.8%
1940	28,962		5.0%
1950	30,362		4.8%
1960	32,132		5.8%
1970	38,037		18.4%
1980	66,298		74.3%
1990	99,358		49.9%
2000	143,293		44.2%
2010	195,085		36.1%
2020	223,024		14.3%
2025 (est.)	238,552	▲	7.0%
U.S. Decennial Census; 1790–1960 1900–1990; 1990–2000 2010–2020

=== Racial and ethnic composition ===
Shelby County, Alabama – Racial and ethnic composition Note: the US Census treats Hispanic/Latino as an ethnic category. This table excludes Latinos from the racial categories and assigns them to a separate category. Hispanics/Latinos may be of any race.
Race / Ethnicity (NH = Non-Hispanic)	Pop 1980	Pop 1990	Pop 2000	Pop 2010	Pop 2020	% 1980	% 1990	% 2000	% 2010	% 2020
White alone (NH)	58,730	90,292	126,951	156,371	162,712	88.58%	90.88%	88.60%	80.16%	72.96%
Black or African American alone (NH)	6,804	7,698	10,570	20,606	28,711	10.26%	7.75%	7.38%	10.56%	12.87%
Native American or Alaska Native alone (NH)	107	263	441	458	478	0.16%	0.26%	0.31%	0.23%	0.21%
Asian alone (NH)	182	573	1,465	3,699	5,114	0.27%	0.58%	1.02%	1.90%	2.29%
Native Hawaiian or Pacific Islander alone (NH)	x	x	21	62	91	x	x	0.01%	0.03%	0.04%
Other race alone (NH)	52	7	51	250	798	0.08%	0.01%	0.04%	0.13%	0.36%
Mixed race or Multiracial (NH)	x	x	884	2,072	8,660	x	x	0.62%	1.06%	3.88%
Hispanic or Latino (any race)	423	525	2,910	11,567	16,460	0.64%	0.53%	2.03%	5.93%	7.38%
Total	66,298	99,358	143,293	195,085	223,024	100.00%	100.00%	100.00%	100.00%	100.00%

=== 2020 census ===
As of the 2020 census, the county had a population of 223,024. The median age was 39.2 years. 23.6% of residents were under the age of 18 and 15.6% of residents were 65 years of age or older. For every 100 females there were 93.1 males, and for every 100 females age 18 and over there were 90.1 males age 18 and over.

The racial makeup of the county was 74.1% White, 13.0% Black or African American, 0.5% American Indian and Alaska Native, 2.3% Asian, 0.0% Native Hawaiian and Pacific Islander, 4.0% from some other race, and 6.1% from two or more races. Hispanic or Latino residents of any race comprised 7.4% of the population.

76.0% of residents lived in urban areas, while 24.0% lived in rural areas.

There were 84,241 households in the county, of which 34.3% had children under the age of 18 living with them and 24.9% had a female householder with no spouse or partner present. About 23.4% of all households were made up of individuals and 9.2% had someone living alone who was 65 years of age or older.

There were 89,060 housing units, of which 5.4% were vacant. Among occupied housing units, 78.1% were owner-occupied and 21.9% were renter-occupied. The homeowner vacancy rate was 1.2% and the rental vacancy rate was 6.6%.

=== 2010 census ===
As of the 2010 census, there were 195,085 people, 74,072 households, and 53,733 families living in the county. The population density was 249 people per square mile (96 people/km^{2}). There were 80,970 housing units at an average density of 103 units per square mile (40 units/km^{2}). The racial makeup of the county was 83.0% White, 10.6% Black or African American, 0.3% Native American, 1.9% Asian, 0.0% Pacific Islander, 2.8% from other races, and 1.4% from two or more races. 5.9% of the population were Hispanic or Latino of any race.

The largest self-identified ancestry groups in Shelby County were

- English – 15.8%
- Irish – 13.9%
- German – 11.1%
- American – 11.0%
- African American - 10.6%
- Italian – 4.3%
- Scots-Irish – 3.9%
- Scottish – 3.7%
- French (except Basque) – 2.7%
- Polish – 1.5%
- Dutch – 1.3%
- Welsh – 0.8%
- Swedish – 0.7%
- Arab – 0.6%
- Norwegian – 0.5%
- Greek – 0.4%

Of the 74,072 households 34.3% had children under the age of 18 living with them, 59.7% were married couples living together, 9.4% had a female householder with no husband present, and 27.5% were non-families. 23.2% of households were one person and 6.2% were one person aged 65 or older. The average household size was 2.60 and the average family size was 3.08.

The age distribution was 25.6% under the age of 18, 7.8% from 18 to 24, 29.2% from 25 to 44, 26.9% from 45 to 64, and 10.6% 65 or older. The median age was 36.9 years. For every 100 females, there were 96.0 males. For every 100 females age 18 and over, there were 95.0 males.

The median household income was $68,380 and the median family income was $81,406. Males had a median income of $57,405 versus $41,692 for females. The per capita income for the county was $33,978. About 5.4% of families and 7.4% of the population were below the poverty line, including 10.3% of those under age 18 and 4.9% of those age 65 or over.

=== 2000 census ===
As of the 2000 census, there were 143,293 people, 54,631 households, and 40,590 families living in the county. The population density was 180 people per square mile (69 people/km^{2}). There were 59,302 housing units at an average density of 75 units per square mile (29 units/km^{2}). The racial makeup of the county was 89.80% White, 7.40% Black or African American, 0.33% Native American, 1.03% Asian, 0.02% Pacific Islander, 0.71% from other races, and 0.72% from two or more races. 2.03% of the population were Hispanic or Latino of any race.

The largest self-reported ancestry groups in Shelby County are: English (16.3%), Irish (13.3%), American (mostly English and Scots-Irish) (11.5%), German (11.0%), Italian (4.2%), Scots-Irish (4.2%) and Scottish (3.9%).

Of the 54,631 households 36.70% had children under the age of 18 living with them, 63.60% were married couples living together, 8.10% had a female householder with no husband present, and 25.70% were non-families. 21.70% of households were one person and 5.20% were one person aged 65 or older. The average household size was 2.59 and the average family size was 3.04.

The age distribution was 26.30% under the age of 18, 8.20% from 18 to 24, 33.70% from 25 to 44, 23.40% from 45 to 64, and 8.50% 65 or older. The median age was 35 years. For every 100 females, there were 96.20 males. For every 100 females age 18 and over, there were 92.60 males.

The median household income was $55,440 and the median family income was $64,105. Males had a median income of $45,798 versus $31,242 for females. The per capita income for the county was $27,176. About 4.60% of families and 6.30% of the population were below the poverty line, including 7.10% of those under age 18 and 8.20% of those age 65 or over.

== Politics ==
Prior to the early 1980s, the Democratic Party dominated Shelby County politics, although at a national level the county often supported Republicans even during the "Solid South" era – it was one of four counties in Alabama to vote for Theodore Roosevelt over Woodrow Wilson in 1912. The county has not supported a Democrat for president since 1960, but Democrats continued to hold most offices for some time. Between 1984 and 1992, the county saw a complete reversal from Democratic dominance to Republicans in control of all but a couple of offices. It was not until the election of 2010, and specifically the results in Alabama House of Representatives District 42, that Republicans held every partisan elected office with jurisdiction or residency (or both) in Shelby County. (In Alabama, municipal officials are elected on a non-partisan basis.)

United States presidential election results for Shelby County, Alabama
Year	Republican		Democratic		Third party(ies)	
Year	No.	%	No.	%	No.	%
1888	1,037	38.68%	1,626	60.65%	18	0.67%
1892	307	8.40%	1,755	48.00%	1,594	43.60%
1896	1,051	38.68%	1,582	58.23%	84	3.09%
1900	1,389	61.05%	749	32.92%	137	6.02%
1904	679	27.85%	1,106	45.37%	653	26.78%
1908	1,231	49.40%	1,011	40.57%	250	10.03%
1912	201	7.56%	1,181	44.45%	1,275	47.99%
1916	1,428	51.81%	1,311	47.57%	17	0.62%
1920	3,235	55.95%	2,523	43.64%	24	0.42%
1924	1,753	45.81%	1,882	49.18%	192	5.02%
1928	2,502	59.53%	1,679	39.95%	22	0.52%
1932	864	26.48%	2,365	72.48%	34	1.04%
1936	777	24.43%	2,371	74.54%	33	1.04%
1940	938	25.20%	2,777	74.61%	7	0.19%
1944	945	32.44%	1,955	67.11%	13	0.45%
1948	921	32.66%	0	0.00%	1,899	67.34%
1952	2,156	46.51%	2,473	53.34%	7	0.15%
1956	2,901	51.98%	2,502	44.83%	178	3.19%
1960	3,157	49.11%	3,225	50.17%	46	0.72%
1964	6,037	75.65%	0	0.00%	1,943	24.35%
1968	1,706	15.84%	1,105	10.26%	7,959	73.90%
1972	9,390	81.24%	1,859	16.08%	309	2.67%
1976	9,035	54.33%	7,197	43.28%	397	2.39%
1980	14,957	64.28%	7,396	31.79%	914	3.93%
1984	21,858	77.88%	5,884	20.96%	326	1.16%
1988	27,052	78.84%	7,138	20.80%	124	0.36%
1992	32,736	67.97%	10,317	21.42%	5,112	10.61%
1996	37,090	73.05%	11,280	22.22%	2,403	4.73%
2000	47,651	76.70%	13,183	21.22%	1,294	2.08%
2004	63,435	80.39%	14,850	18.82%	621	0.79%
2008	69,060	76.19%	20,625	22.75%	958	1.06%
2012	71,436	77.03%	20,051	21.62%	1,255	1.35%
2016	73,020	72.12%	22,977	22.69%	5,257	5.19%
2020	79,700	69.33%	33,268	28.94%	1,982	1.72%
2024	79,666	69.46%	33,087	28.85%	1,945	1.70%

United States Senate election results for Shelby County, Alabama2
Year	Republican		Democratic		Third party(ies)	
Year	No.	%	No.	%	No.	%
2020	77,836	67.87%	36,606	31.92%	236	0.21%

United States Senate election results for Shelby County, Alabama3
Year	Republican		Democratic		Third party(ies)	
Year	No.	%	No.	%	No.	%
2022	50,762	72.65%	16,276	23.29%	2,836	4.06%

Alabama Gubernatorial election results for Shelby County
Year	Republican		Democratic		Third party(ies)	
Year	No.	%	No.	%	No.	%
2022	51,196	73.20%	14,913	21.32%	3,830	5.48%

In 2013, the county was the plaintiff in Shelby County v. Holder, which struck down portions of the Voting Rights Act of 1965 as unconstitutional.

== Education ==
Shelby County Schools operates 12 elementary, three intermediate, seven middle, and seven high schools in the county, serving students living in areas of the county outside of Hoover, Alabaster, and Pelham. They also operate the Linda Nolen Learning Center, a school for students with developmental disabilities, and a career technical school available to any high school student in the district. Alabaster City Schools operates two elementary, one intermediate, one middle, and one high school, serving students living in the city of Alabaster. Pelham City Schools operates two elementary, one middle, and one high school, serving students living in the City of Pelham. Hoover City Schools operates 17 schools in its district, including two elementary, one middle, and one high school in Shelby County, serving students living in the city of Hoover.

Numerous private schools operate in the county, including Briarwood Christian School, Joseph Bruno Montessori School, Hilltop Montessori School, Coosa Valley Academy, Westminster School at Oak Mountain, Evangel Classical Christian School, Indian Springs School, Our Lady of the Valley Catholic School, The Hillsboro School, and Cornerstone Christian School.

Jefferson State Community College operates its Shelby-Hoover Campus on Valleydale Road. The University of Montevallo, a public liberal arts college, operates in Montevallo, in southwestern Shelby County. Faulkner University, a private Christian university, operates its Birmingham campus in Hoover, on Valleydale Road near I-65.

== Transportation ==
=== Major highways ===
- Interstate 65
- U.S. Highway 31 / State Route 3 (unsigned)
- U.S. Highway 231 / State Route 53 (unsigned)
- U.S. Highway 280 / State Route 38 (unsigned)
- State Road 25
- State Road 70
- State Road 76
- State Road 119
- State Road 139
- State Road 145
- State Road 155
- State Road 261

=== Railroads ===
- CSX Transportation
- Norfolk Southern Railway
- Calera & Shelby Railroad

=== Airports ===
- Shelby County Airport – General Aviation
- Birmingham-Shuttlesworth International Airport – Commercial passenger and freight service in an adjacent county Jefferson County

== Communities ==
=== Cities ===
- Alabaster
- Birmingham (mostly in Jefferson County)
- Calera (partly in Chilton County)
- Chelsea
- Columbiana (county seat)
- Helena (partly in Jefferson County)
- Hoover (mostly in Jefferson County)
- Leeds (partly in Jefferson County and St. Clair County)
- Montevallo
- Pelham
- Vestavia Hills (partly in Jefferson County)
- Vincent (partly in St. Clair County and Talladega County)
- Westover

=== Towns ===
- Harpersville
- Indian Springs Village
- Wilsonville
- Wilton

=== Census-designated places ===
- Brantleyville (a village west of Alabaster)
- Brook Highland
- Dunnavant (a village northeast of Chelsea)
- Eagle Point
- Highland Lakes
- Meadowbrook
- Pea Ridge
- Shelby (a village east of Calera)
- Shoal Creek
- Sterrett (a village northwest of Vincent)
- Vandiver (a village northeast of Chelsea)

=== Unincorporated communities ===
- Abbot Springs
- Acton
- Aldrich
- Arkwright
- Calcis
- Fourmile
- Inverness
- Maylene
- Nelson
- Ryan
- Saginaw
- Siluria (a neighborhood of Alabaster)

== Places of interest ==
- Aldrich Coal Mine Museum
- American Village
- Cahaba River Wildlife Management Area
- Colonial Promenade Alabaster
- Heart of Dixie Railroad Museum
- Indian Springs School
- Oak Mountain Amphitheatre
- Oak Mountain State Park
- Old Shelby County Courthouse and Museum
- Shelby Iron Works Park

== See also ==
- National Register of Historic Places listings in Shelby County, Alabama
- Properties on the Alabama Register of Landmarks and Heritage in Shelby County, Alabama
