= Downtown Montevallo Historic District =

Historic district in Alabama, United States

- U.S. National Register of Historic Places
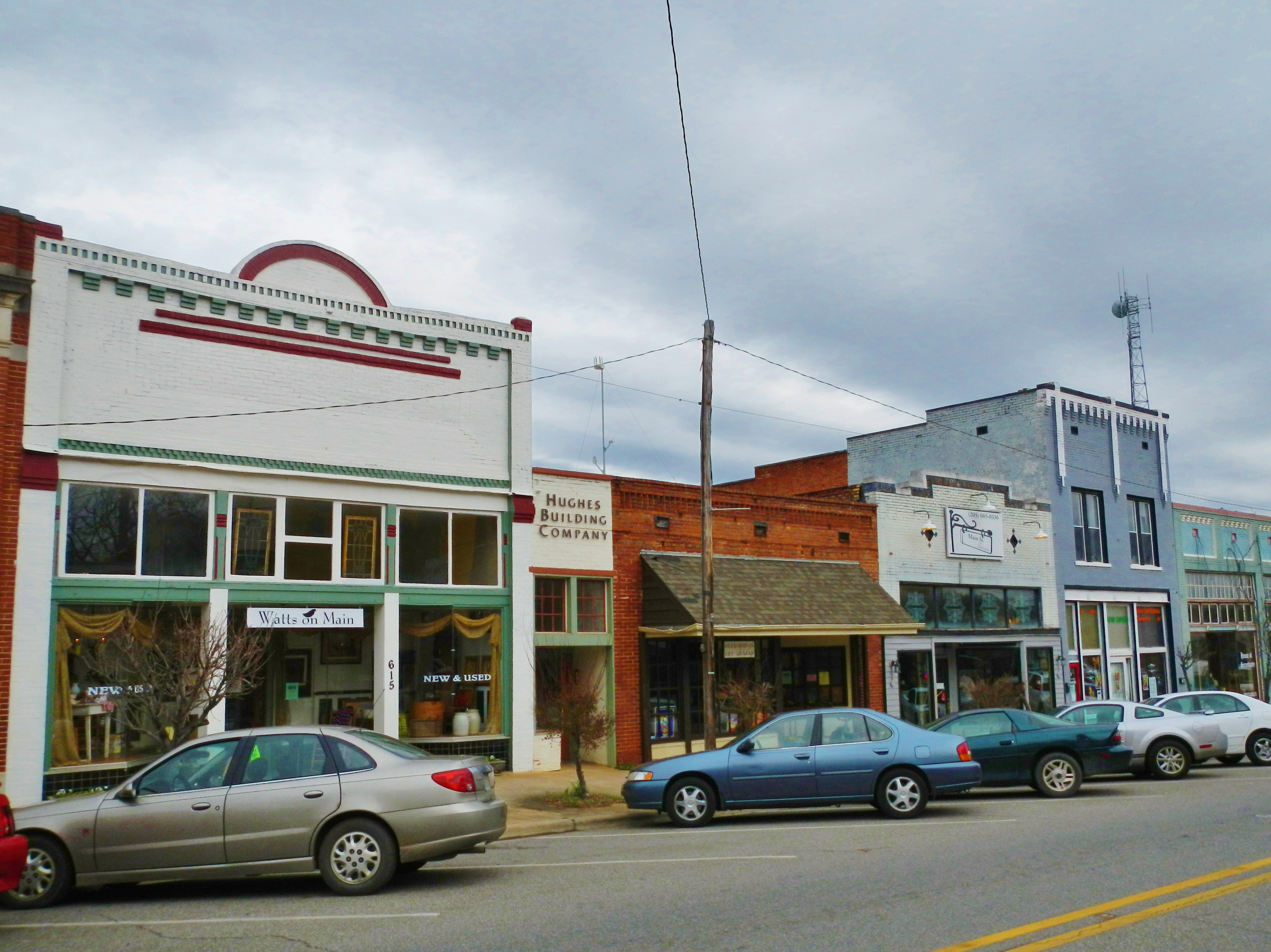
- 615 Main St. at left, two-story 635 Main St. at right

- Location within Alabama
- Location: 555-925 Main, 710-745 Middle & 608 Valley Sts., Montevallo, Alabama
- Coordinates: 33°06′03″N 86°51′46″W
- Area: 10 acres (4.0 ha)
- Architectural style: Classical Revival, Moderne
- NRHP reference No.: 13000180
- Added to NRHP: April 23, 2013

The Downtown Montevallo Historic District in Montevallo, Alabama is a historic district which was listed on the National Register of Historic Places in 2013. It included 30 contributing buildings and four non-contributing buildings.

It includes 555-925 Main, 710-745 Middle & 608 Valley Sts. in Montevallo. All but two of the Main and Middle ones are zero-lot-line buildings. It includes:

- Bob Reid Ford/Montevallo Motors (c.1925), 555 Main St., a one-story commercial building with roof concealed by flat parapets on its front facade with two slightly raised intermediate steps, and stepped parapets on its side elevations; (see accompanying photo #6, left; photo #7)
- Rogan's Store (c.1900), 600 Main St., a 2-story 2-part commercial block building, with roof by flat parapet and at its sides by stepped parapets on its sides; has a center pilaster and corner pilasters in its upper facade with intermediate corbelled parapet cap (photo #8, Right; Photo #9).
- Alabama Power/McCulley's Grocery Store (c.1920), 603 Main St., 1-story 1-part commercial block building a parapet (Photo #1, left).
- Maroney General Store/Klotzman's Ready to Wear (c.1925), 615 Main St., 1-story 1-part commercial block building with a shaped parapet and stepped parapets; "recessed storefront divided into three bays by two intermediate pillars, central entrance with transom flanked by splayed intermediate display windows and flanking flush outer display windows, continuous low tile bulkheads, tall transom area with central grouped transom window and outer double light transom windows; recessed panel at upper facade with corbelled parapet cap with central arched cap, thin corbelled band above transoms". (Photo #1, 3rd from left).
- IGA Grocery Store (c.1920), 635 Main St., 2-story 2-part commercial block building with a flat parapet and stepped parapets; 'storefront system with some modern replacement elements, 2 intermediate pillars support an iron lintel the spans the full width of the storefront, central entrance bay with off-center aluminum frame door with sidelight and historic 1-light transom, entrance at south end of southern storefront bay with a historic 1- light transom flanked by a fixed display window on a low brick bulkhead with a historic 1-light transom, historic single fixed display window to the north with a 1-light transom, double replacement synthetic windows at upper level of the facade; decorative corbelled brick parapet with drop pendants; single segmental arched window openings with infill at upper level and rear elevation; off-center entrance at rear elevation with modern steel door; painted brick facade and partial side walls, exposed brick at remainder of side walls and rear elevation set in common bond." (Photo #2, 4th from right.)

It adjoins the University of Montevallo Historic District, which has three buildings continuing along in the Main Street corridor:

- U.S. Post Office (c.1936), 35 Vine St. (at Main St.): brick one-story building with a hipped tile roof; its central entrance is a stone entablature surround, another(?) entrance has transom and sidelights, flanked to either side by single 12/12 steel double hung windows in rectangular openings; it has a decorative stone cornice with dentils and a stone water table (photos #18-19)
- McCounnghy-Warnke House (c.1900), 36 Vine St., one-story frame house with a hipped shingle roof with cross gables
- Bandy-Drapkin House (1915), 37 Vine St., a one-story frame house with a side gable composition shingle roof with angle bracketed eaves and central gable decorative dormer at its front slope, has polygonal bay windows (#20)
