= Colonial Promenade Alabaster =

- Location: Alabaster, Alabama, United States
- Coordinates: 33°14′4.32″N 86°48′9.06″W
- Opened: 2005
- Developer: Colonial Properties
- Manager: Colonial Properties
- Owner: Colonial Properties
- Num. of stores: approx. 44
- Num. of anchor tenants: 13 (5 south, 8 north)
- Floor area: 1,000,000 square feet (93,000 m^{2}), with 685,326 square feet (64,000 m^{2}) in the first phase and 355,269 square feet (33,000 m^{2}) in the second phase
- Floors: 1
- Parking: Parking lot
- Website: Official Website

The Colonial Promenade Alabaster is a lifestyle center that opened in 2005 and is located in Alabaster, Alabama, United States. The 1,000,000-square-foot (93,000 m^{2}) shopping center is the largest in Shelby County and it was developed by Colonial Properties Trust. It was at the center of a nationally publicized controversy over the use of eminent domain to facilitate private commercial development.

== Tenants ==
South Promenade

- JCPenney
- TJMaxx
- Target
- Dick's Sporting Goods
- Best Buy Closed in October 2017
- PetSmart

North Promenade

- Walmart
- Lowe's
- Belk
- Amstar Theater
- Ross
- Bed Bath & Beyond
- Old Navy
- Books-A-Million

== Ownership changes ==
In December 2007, Colonial Properties sold Colonial Promenade Alabaster II and 2 outparcels but continued to manage the property.

In December 2009, Colonial Properties reacquired Colonial Promenade after a joint venture was dissolved.

In December 2012, Huntsville-based Propst Properties acquired the North Promenade.

== Opposition to construction ==
The project was opposed by some of the property owners whose land was needed for the development. A group of ten owners sued the City of Alabaster and Colonial Properties to prevent the controversial use of eminent domain to force them to sell approximately 10 of the 400 acres needed. In June 2003, the Alabaster City Council voted 6–0 (with 1 abstention) to adopt the I-65, 238 Urban Renewal and Urban Redevelopment Plan which determined that the property in question was a "blighted area". The city subsequently entered into an agreement to condemn and seize the land, and then exchange it and certain infrastructure improvements for the construction of new facilities to be provided by Shelby Land Partners, a limited-liability corporation established to negotiate with the city for the development. At the time, Wal-Mart and Belk had already been announced as prospective tenants.

Lily Spence, a landowner whose property had been condemned for the development, appeared on CNN to voice her objections to having her property condemned and to the price offered. The case was cited by Alabama state legislators who passed legislation severely restricting the scope of public uses allowed in eminent domain cases. The July 2005 law followed a Supreme Court decision in Kelo v. City of New London, a Connecticut dispute, that the matter was for states to decide.
