= Highland Lakes, Alabama =

- Census-designated place
- Location of Highland Lakes in Shelby County, Alabama.
- Coordinates: 33°23′54″N 86°39′05″W
- Country: United States
- State: Alabama
- County: Shelby

Area
  - Total: 3.96 sq mi (10.25 km^{2})
  - Land: 3.81 sq mi (9.88 km^{2})
  - Water: 0.14 sq mi (0.36 km^{2})
- Elevation: 787 ft (240 m)

Population (2020)
  - Total: 5,239
  - Density: 1,373/sq mi (530.1/km^{2})
- Time zone: UTC-6 (Central (CST))
  - Summer (DST): UTC-5 (CDT)
- ZIP code: 35242
- Area codes: 205, 659
- GNIS feature ID: 2582679

Highland Lakes is a census-designated place in Shelby County, Alabama, United States. As of the 2020 census, Highland Lakes had a population of 5,239.

== Geography ==
Highland Lakes is located within the Highland Lakes subdivision off U.S. Route 280 atop Double Oak Mountain, a southern extension of the Appalachian Mountains. Via U.S. 280, downtown Birmingham is 16 mi (26 km) northwest, and Chelsea is 6 mi (10 km) southeast.

== Demographics ==
Historical population
Census	Pop.	Note	%±
2010	3,926		—
2020	5,239		33.4%
U.S. Decennial Census

Highland Lakes was first listed as a census designated place in the 2010 U.S. census.

=== Racial and ethnic composition ===
Highland Lakes CDP, Alabama – Racial and ethnic composition Note: the US Census treats Hispanic/Latino as an ethnic category. This table excludes Latinos from the racial categories and assigns them to a separate category. Hispanics/Latinos may be of any race.
Race / Ethnicity (NH = Non-Hispanic)	Pop 2010	Pop 2020	% 2010	% 2020
White alone (NH)	3,405	4,447	86.73%	84.88%
Black or African American alone (NH)	295	380	7.51%	7.25%
Native American or Alaska Native alone (NH)	9	5	0.23%	0.10%
Asian alone (NH)	89	137	2.27%	2.62%
Native Hawaiian or Pacific Islander alone (NH)	0	0	0.00%	0.00%
Other race alone (NH)	16	12	0.41%	0.23%
Mixed race or Multiracial (NH)	48	169	1.22%	3.23%
Hispanic or Latino (any race)	64	89	1.63%	1.70%
Total	3,926	5,239	100.00%	100.00%

=== 2020 census ===
As of the 2020 census, Highland Lakes had a population of 5,239.

The median age was 47.2 years. 22.7% of residents were under the age of 18 and 20.2% of residents were 65 years of age or older. For every 100 females there were 93.0 males, and for every 100 females age 18 and over there were 92.7 males age 18 and over.

99.9% of residents lived in urban areas, while 0.1% lived in rural areas.

There were 1,873 households in Highland Lakes, of which 34.2% had children under the age of 18 living in them. Of all households, 78.6% were married-couple households, 6.3% were households with a male householder and no spouse or partner present, and 12.9% were households with a female householder and no spouse or partner present. About 11.6% of all households were made up of individuals and 5.0% had someone living alone who was 65 years of age or older.

There were 1,928 housing units, of which 2.9% were vacant. The homeowner vacancy rate was 1.5% and the rental vacancy rate was 16.5%.
