= Coosa Valley Academy =

Location
- 163 Park Street; Harpersville, Shelby County, Alabama 35078; United States; 33°20′07″N 86°25′49″W

Information
- Established: 1970 (56 years ago)
- CEEB code: 011377
- NCES School ID: 00001729
- Headmistress: Pamela Lovelady
- Grades: PK-12
- Enrollment: 237 (2016)
- Colors: Red and gray
- Mascot: Rebel
- Nickname: Rebels
- Website: www.coosavalleyacademy.org

Coosa Valley Academy is a private, co-educational PK-12 school in Shelby County, Alabama, near Harpersville. Coosa Valley Academy is located in Harpersville, AL.

Over 95% of students who graduate Coosa Valley enroll in a four-year college.

== History ==
Coosa Valley Academy was founded in 1970 as a segregation academy. The school's mascot is a Confederate Colonel, and the sports teams are nicknamed the Rebels.

== Accreditation ==
Coosa Valley Academy is accredited by AISA, an organization that was created to support segregation academies, and SACS.

== Demographics ==
In 2018 ProPublica reported that 96.9% of the student body was White, compared to the Shelby County District which was 72% White.

== Recognition and awards ==
=== Most Educated Faculty ===
In 2019 Coosa Valley Academy was rated in the top 20% of private schools in Alabama for schools with the most educated faculty. Over 75% of the faculty have a master's degree or higher, compared to an average of 50% for Alabama Private schools. Coosa Valley ranked 15th in the state.

=== Blue Ribbon School ===
Coosa Valley Academy was a Blue Ribbon School from 2007 to 2019.
