= Ryan, Alabama =

- Unincorporated community
- Location within Alabama Location within the United States
- Coordinates: 33°10′04″N 86°52′00″W
- Country: United States
- State: Alabama
- County: Shelby
- Elevation: 528 ft (161 m)
- Time zone: UTC-6 (Central (CST))
  - Summer (DST): UTC-5 (CDT)
- Area codes: 205, 659

Ryan is an unincorporated community in Shelby County, Alabama, United States.
