= Brook Highland, Alabama =

- Census-designated place (CDP) and Unincorporated community
- Location of Brook Highland in Shelby County, Alabama.
- Coordinates: 33°26′09″N 86°41′05″W
- Country: United States
- State: Alabama
- County: Shelby

Area
  - Total: 2.85 sq mi (7.38 km^{2})
  - Land: 2.78 sq mi (7.21 km^{2})
  - Water: 0.066 sq mi (0.17 km^{2})
- Elevation: 666 ft (203 m)

Population (2020)
  - Total: 7,406
  - Density: 2,660.1/sq mi (1,027.07/km^{2})
- Time zone: UTC-6 (Central (CST))
  - Summer (DST): UTC-5 (CDT)
- ZIP code: 35242
- Area codes: 205 and 659
- FIPS code: 01-40806
- GNIS feature ID: 2403203

Brook Highland (formerly known as Lake Purdy) is an unincorporated community and census-designated place in northern Shelby County, Alabama, United States. At the 2020 census, the population was 7,406.

== Geography ==
The community is located southeast of Birmingham along U.S. Route 280. Many shopping centers, restaurants, and neighborhoods are located in the community adjacent to U.S. 280. Downtown Birmingham is 13 mi (21 km) to the northwest, and Chelsea is 8 mi (13 km) southeast, both via U.S. 280.

According to the U.S. Census Bureau, the community has a total area of 2.9 square miles (7.5 km^{2}), of which 2.8 square miles (7.3 km^{2}) is land and 0.05 square miles (0.13 km^{2}) (1.87%) is water.

== Demographics ==
Historical population
Census	Pop.	Note	%±
1990	1,840		—
2000	5,799		215.2%
2010	6,746		16.3%
2020	7,406		9.8%

The community first appeared as a census designated place in the 1990 U.S. Census under the name Lake Purdy. The name of the CDP was changed from Lake Purdy to Brook Highland for the 2010 U.S. census.

=== Racial and ethnic composition ===
Brook Highland CDP, Alabama – Racial and ethnic composition Note: the US Census treats Hispanic/Latino as an ethnic category. This table excludes Latinos from the racial categories and assigns them to a separate category. Hispanics/Latinos may be of any race.
Race / Ethnicity (NH = Non-Hispanic)	Pop 2000	Pop 2010	Pop 2020	% 2000	% 2010	% 2020
White alone (NH)	4,865	4,728	4,698	83.89%	70.09%	63.44%
Black or African American alone (NH)	450	1,088	1,408	7.76%	16.13%	19.01%
Native American or Alaska Native alone (NH)	22	11	14	0.38%	0.16%	0.19%
Asian alone (NH)	236	294	448	4.07%	4.36%	6.05%
Native Hawaiian or Pacific Islander alone (NH)	1	0	4	0.02%	0.00%	0.05%
Other race alone (NH)	1	17	42	0.02%	0.25%	0.57%
Mixed race or Multiracial (NH)	25	79	300	0.43%	1.17%	4.05%
Hispanic or Latino (any race)	199	529	492	3.43%	7.84%	6.64%
Total	5,799	6,746	7,406	100.00%	100.00%	100.00%

=== 2020 census ===
As of the 2020 census, Brook Highland had a population of 7,406. The median age was 34.5 years. 18.6% of residents were under the age of 18 and 11.6% of residents were 65 years of age or older. For every 100 females there were 88.8 males, and for every 100 females age 18 and over there were 86.1 males age 18 and over.

99.7% of residents lived in urban areas, while 0.3% lived in rural areas.

There were 3,535 households in Brook Highland, of which 23.0% had children under the age of 18 living in them. Of all households, 36.2% were married-couple households, 22.4% were households with a male householder and no spouse or partner present, and 34.7% were households with a female householder and no spouse or partner present. About 40.5% of all households were made up of individuals and 6.4% had someone living alone who was 65 years of age or older.

There were 3,680 housing units, of which 3.9% were vacant. The homeowner vacancy rate was 0.7% and the rental vacancy rate was 4.2%.

=== 2010 census ===
As of the census of 2010, there were 6,746 people, 3,242 households, and 1,588 families living in the community. The population density was 2,300 inhabitants per square mile (890/km^{2}). There were 3,550 housing units at an average density of 1,267.9 per square mile (489.5/km^{2}). The racial makeup of the community was 73.6% White, 16.2% Black or African American, 0.2% Native American, 4.4% Asian, 0% Pacific Islander, 3.5% from other races, and 2.1% from two or more races. 7.8% of the population were Hispanic or Latino of any race.

There were 3,242 households, out of which 23.1% had children under the age of 18 living with them, 37.9% were married couples living together, 8.3% had a female householder with no husband present, and 51.0% were non-families. 42.2% of all households were made up of individuals, and 2.2% had someone living alone who was 65 years of age or older. The average household size was 2.08 and the average family size was 2.93.

In the community, the population was spread out, with 20.3% under the age of 18, 13.5% from 18 to 24, 35.2% from 25 to 44, 25.6% from 45 to 64, and 5.4% who were 65 years of age or older. The median age was 31.3 years. For every 100 females, there were 98.2 males. For every 100 females age 18 and over, there were 95.9 males.

The median income for a household in the community was $57,214, and the median income for a family was $116,498. Males had a median income of $57,413 versus $41,948 for females. The per capita income for the community was $40,578. About 2.4% of families and 4.7% of the population were below the poverty line, including 2.3% of those under age 18 and 0% of those age 65 or over.

=== 2000 census ===
As of the census of 2000, there were 5,799 people, 2,789 households, and 1,327 families living in the community. The population density was 1,936.7 inhabitants per square mile (747.8/km^{2}). There were 3,044 housing units at an average density of 1,016.6 per square mile (392.5/km^{2}). The racial makeup of the community was 86.62% White, 7.78% Black or African American, 0.38% Native American, 4.14% Asian, 0.02% Pacific Islander, 0.47% from other races, and 0.60% from two or more races. 3.43% of the population were Hispanic or Latino of any race.

There were 2,789 households, out of which 24.5% had children under the age of 18 living with them, 40.9% were married couples living together, 4.7% had a female householder with no husband present, and 52.4% were non-families. 42.0% of all households were made up of individuals, and 1.2% had someone living alone who was 65 years of age or older. The average household size was 2.08 and the average family size was 2.98.

In the community, the population was spread out, with 21.3% under the age of 18, 14.4% from 18 to 24, 43.8% from 25 to 44, 17.3% from 45 to 64, and 3.1% who were 65 years of age or older. The median age was 29 years. For every 100 females, there were 104.1 males. For every 100 females age 18 and over, there were 105.6 males.

The median income for a household in the community was $54,349, and the median income for a family was $91,989. Males had a median income of $49,792 versus $32,188 for females. The per capita income for the community was $39,019. About 0.2% of families and 3.5% of the population were below the poverty line, including 1.1% of those under age 18 and 1.7% of those age 65 or over.
