= Indian Springs Village, Alabama =

- Town
- Flag Seal

- Location of Indian Springs Village in Shelby County, Alabama.
- Coordinates: 33°21′50″N 86°44′52″W
- Country: United States
- State: Alabama
- County: Shelby

Area
  - Total: 3.91 sq mi (10.13 km^{2})
  - Land: 3.88 sq mi (10.04 km^{2})
  - Water: 0.035 sq mi (0.09 km^{2})
- Elevation: 545 ft (166 m)

Population (2020)
  - Total: 2,481
  - Density: 640.3/sq mi (247.21/km^{2})
- Time zone: UTC-6 (Central (CST))
  - Summer (DST): UTC-5 (CDT)
- ZIP code: 35124
- Area codes: 205, 659
- FIPS code: 01-37465
- GNIS feature ID: 2404759
- Website: http://www.indianspringsvillage.org/

Indian Springs Village (often simply called Indian Springs) is a town in Shelby County, Alabama, United States, in the Birmingham metropolitan area. It incorporated effective November 14, 1990. At the 2010 census the population was 2,363, up from 2,225 in 2000.

An F2 tornado on Palm Sunday, March 27, 1994, damaged business buildings of Indian Springs, in addition to structures in Pelham, Helena, and Inverness. Another tornado struck the town on March 25, 2021, causing EF2 damage to several homes and downing trees throughout several neighborhoods. The tornado eventually reached low-end EF3 strength northeast of town.

== Geography ==
According to the U.S. Census Bureau, the town has a total area of 3.6 square miles (9.3 km^{2}), all land.

== Demographics ==
Historical population
Census	Pop.	Note	%±
2000	2,225		—
2010	2,363		6.2%
2020	2,481		5.0%
U.S. Decennial Census; 2013 Estimate

=== 2020 census ===
Indian Springs Village town, Alabama – Racial and ethnic composition Note: the US Census treats Hispanic/Latino as an ethnic category. This table excludes Latinos from the racial categories and assigns them to a separate category. Hispanics/Latinos may be of any race.
Race / Ethnicity (NH = Non-Hispanic)	Pop 2000	Pop 2010	Pop 2020	% 2000	% 2010	% 2020
White alone (NH)	2,180	2,244	2,263	97.98%	94.96%	91.21%
Black or African American alone (NH)	2	35	32	0.09%	1.48%	1.29%
Native American or Alaska Native alone (NH)	7	5	5	0.31%	0.21%	0.20%
Asian alone (NH)	20	46	49	0.90%	1.95%	1.98%
Native Hawaiian or Pacific Islander alone (NH)	1	0	0	0.04%	0.00%	0.00%
Other race alone (NH)	0	0	1	0.00%	0.00%	0.04%
Mixed race or Multiracial (NH)	12	11	88	0.54%	0.47%	3.55%
Hispanic or Latino (any race)	3	22	43	0.13%	0.93%	1.73%
Total	2,225	2,363	2,481	100.00%	100.00%	100.00%

=== 2010 census ===
At the 2010 census there were 2,363 people, 835 households, and 710 families in the town. The population density was 656.4 inhabitants per square mile (253.4/km^{2}). There were 867 housing units at an average density of 240.8 per square mile (93.0/km^{2}). The racial makeup of the town was 95.7% White, 1.5% Black or African American, 0.2% Native American, 1.9% Asian, 0.0% Pacific Islander, and 0.6% from two or more races. 0.9% of the population were Hispanic or Latino of any race. Of the 835 households 32.3% had children under the age of 18 living with them, 77.1% were married couples living together, 5.5% had a female householder with no husband present, and 15.0% were non-families. 13.3% of households were one person and 7.3% were one person aged 65 or older. The average household size was 2.79 and the average family size was 3.05.

The age distribution was 24.8% under the age of 18, 6.1% from 18 to 24, 14.6% from 25 to 44, 37.9% from 45 to 64, and 16.5% 65 or older. The median age was 47.4 years. For every 100 females, there were 102.5 males. For every 100 females age 18 and over, there were 96.2 males.

The median household income was $95,921 and the median family income was $100,600. Males had a median income of $71,917 versus $47,454 for females. The per capita income for the town was $58,467. About 3.1% of families and 2.1% of the population were below the poverty line, including none of those under age 18 and 6.2% of those age 65 or over.

=== 2000 census ===
At the 2000 census there were 2,225 people, 789 households, and 685 families in the town. The population density was 610.5 inhabitants per square mile (235.7/km^{2}). There were 809 housing units at an average density of 222.0 per square mile (85.7/km^{2}). The racial makeup of the town was 98.11% White, 0.09% Black or African American, 0.31% Native American, 0.90% Asian, 0.04% Pacific Islander, and 0.54% from two or more races. 0.13% of the population were Hispanic or Latino of any race. Of the 789 households 38.0% had children under the age of 18 living with them, 80.4% were married couples living together, 4.2% had a female householder with no husband present, and 13.1% were non-families. 11.9% of households were one person and 4.6% were one person aged 65 or older. The average household size was 2.82 and the average family size was 3.05.

The age distribution was 25.7% under the age of 18, 5.3% from 18 to 24, 21.7% from 25 to 44, 34.7% from 45 to 64, and 12.7% 65 or older. The median age was 44 years. For every 100 females, there were 105.1 males. For every 100 females age 18 and over, there were 96.9 males.

The median household income was $92,229 and the median family income was $96,760. Males had a median income of $66,648 versus $42,222 for females. The per capita income for the town was $37,904. About 0.1% of families and 0.4% of the population were below the poverty line, including none of those under age 18 and 0.4% of those age 65 or over.

== Notable person ==
Michael McCullers, writer and director is an Indian Springs native.
