= Nelson, Alabama =

- Unincorporated community
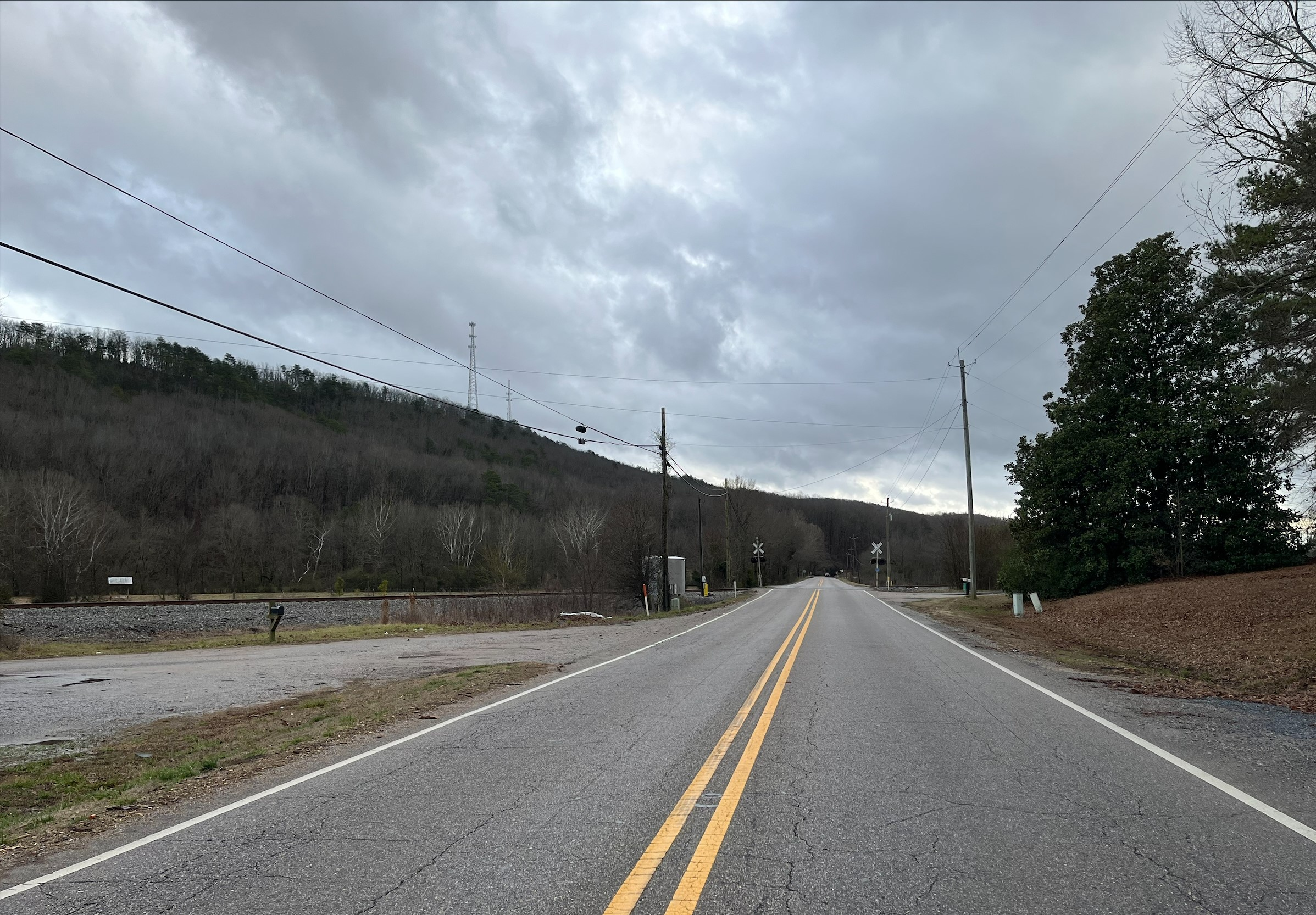
- Norfolk Southern Railway crossing Alabama Highway 25 in Nelson

- Location within Alabama Location within the United States
- Coordinates: 33°12′55″N 86°34′52″W
- Country: United States
- State: Alabama
- County: Shelby
- Elevation: 463 ft (141 m)
- Time zone: UTC-6 (Central (CST))
  - Summer (DST): UTC-5 (CDT)
- Area codes: 205, 659
- GNIS feature ID: 156773

Nelson, also known as Nelson Switch, or Cates Crossing, is an unincorporated community in Shelby County, Alabama, United States. Nelson is located at the crossing of Alabama State Route 25 and the Norfolk Southern Railway, between Columbiana and Wilsonville.

== History ==
Nelson was the birthplace of Frank Nelson, Jr. Nelson grew up working in his father's store in Columbiana. After attending the University of Alabama, he began manufacturing charcoal that was shipped to Brierfield Furnace and Shelby Iron Company. He then moved to Birmingham and founded the North Birmingham Land Company. Due to his efforts, over thirty manufacturing plants located to North Birmingham, including the American Cast Iron Pipe Company and American Radiator Company. Nelson then became president of the Empire Coal Company located in Empire. The Frank Nelson Building, located at the corner of 20th Street North and 2nd Avenue North in Birmingham, is named in his honor.

The Columbiana Ore Company operated iron ore mines at Nelson in 1918.

A post office operated under the name Nelson from 1857 to 1904.

On April 18, 1953, Nelson was damaged by an F3 tornado.
