= Black Warrior Basin =

Geologic sedimentary basin of Alabama and Mississippi, United States

Coordinates: 33°19′N 87°13′W

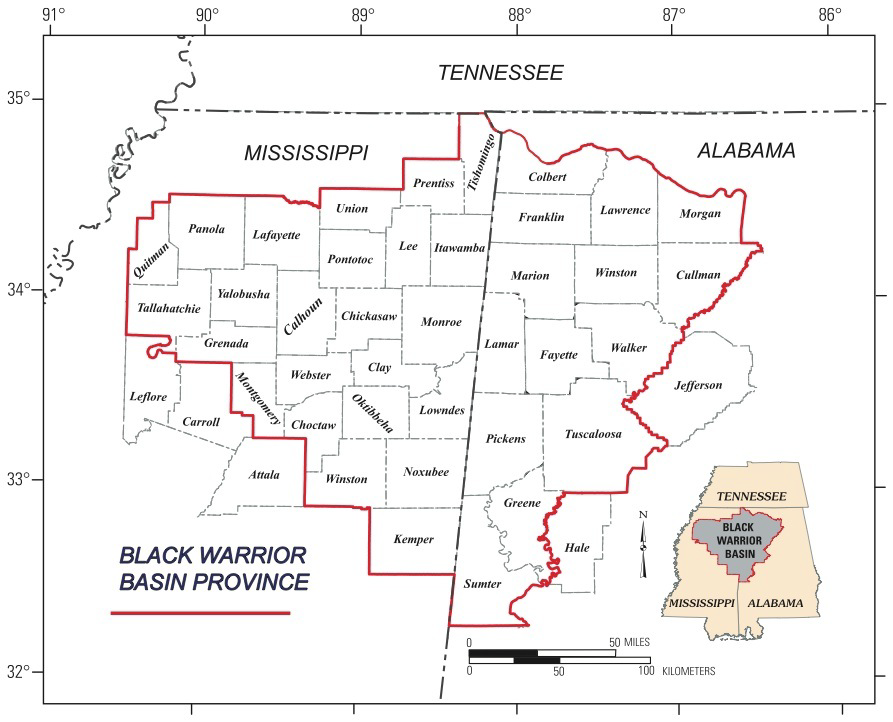
Location of the Black Warrior Basin Province in northwestern Alabama and northeastern Mississippi, published in the USGS report entitled, Geologic Assessment of Undiscovered Oil and Gas Resources of the Black Warrior Basin Province of Alabama and Mississippi.

The Black Warrior Basin is a geologic sedimentary basin of western Alabama and northern Mississippi in the United States. It is named for the Black Warrior River and is developed for coal and coalbed methane production, as well as for conventional oil and natural gas production. Coalbed methane of the Black Warrior Basin has been developed and in production longer than in any other location in the United States. The coalbed methane is produced from the Pennsylvanian Pottsville Coal Interval.

The Black Warrior basin was a foreland basin during the Ouachita Orogeny during the Pennsylvanian and Permian Periods. The basin also received sediments from the Appalachian orogeny during the Pennsylvanian. The western margin of the basin lies beneath the sediments of the Mississippi embayment where it is contiguous with the Arkoma Basin of northern Arkansas and northeastern Oklahoma. The region existed as a quiescent continental shelf environment through the early Paleozoic from the Cambrian through the Mississippian with the deposition of shelf sandstones, shale, limestone, dolomite and chert.
