= Inverness, Shelby County, Alabama =

Inverness, Alabama
- Neighborhood of Hoover, Alabama; Former census designated place
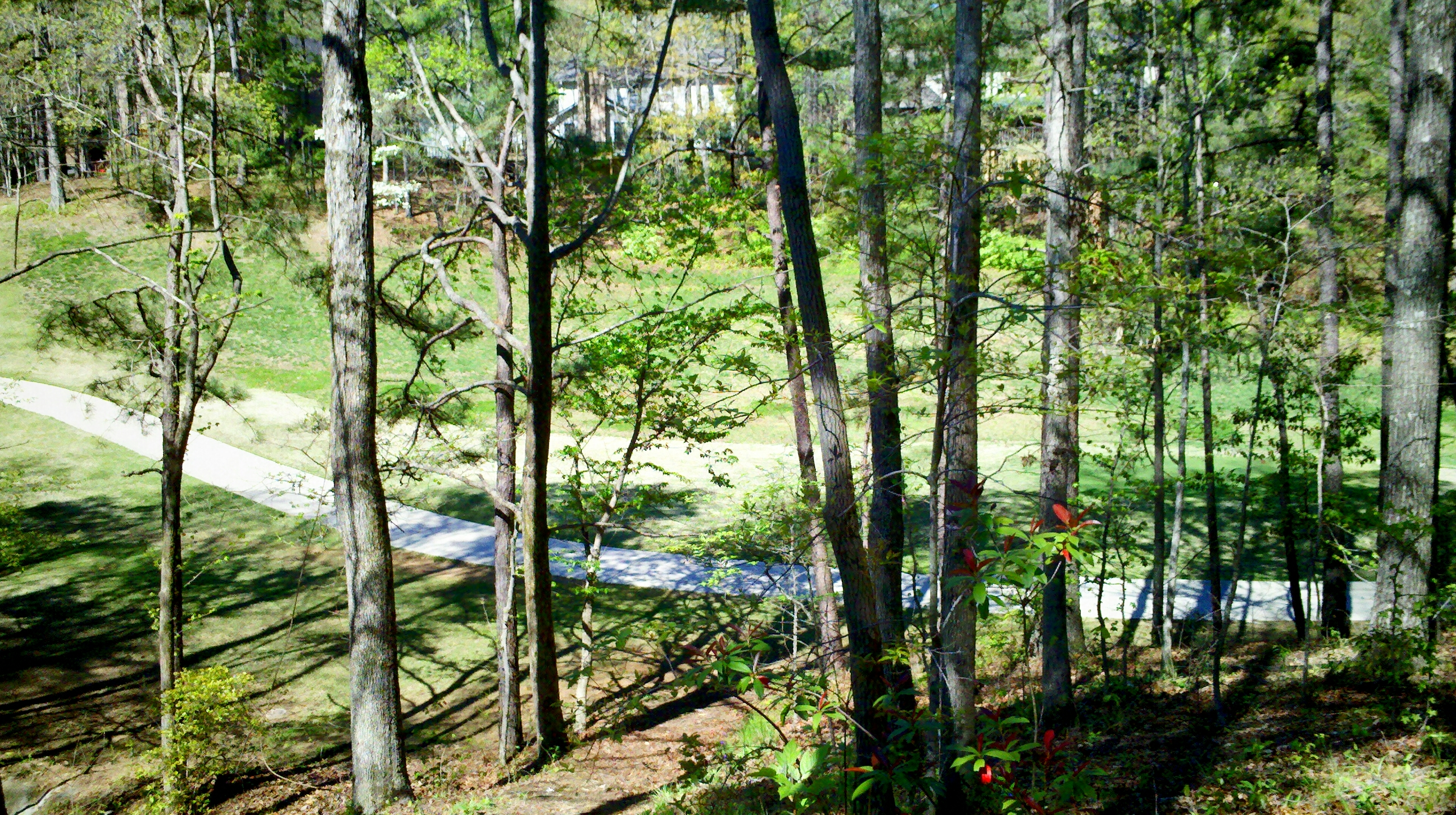
- Inverness Country Club

- Location within Alabama Location within the United States
- Coordinates: 33°24′25″N 86°42′40″W
- Country: United States
- State: Alabama
- County: Shelby
- Elevation: 492 ft (150 m)
- Time zone: UTC-6 (Central (CST))
  - Summer (DST): UTC-5 (CDT)
- Area codes: 205, 659
- GNIS feature ID: 146473

Inverness is a former census-designated place and now neighborhood within Hoover, a suburb of Birmingham, Alabama, United States. It derives from a Scottish city of the same name.

U.S. Route 280 runs through Inverness and includes many restaurants and shopping centers, along with a major intersection with Valleydale Road (County Road 17).

The Inverness community is only a few miles from downtown Birmingham. The Cahaba River, Lake Heather, and the Inverness Country Club can be found in Inverness. Inverness is mostly located within the city limits of Hoover, with some portions in unincorporated Shelby County.

An F2 tornado damaged business buildings here along with Pelham, Helena, and Indian Springs on March 27, 1994.

== Demographics ==
Historical population
Census	Pop.	Note	%±
1990	2,528		—
U.S. Decennial Census

Inverness was classified as a census-designated place or CDP within Shelby County for the 1990 U.S. Census. It was soon after annexed into the city of Hoover.
