= University of Montevallo Historic District =

Historic district in Alabama, United States

- U.S. National Register of Historic Places
- U.S. Historic district
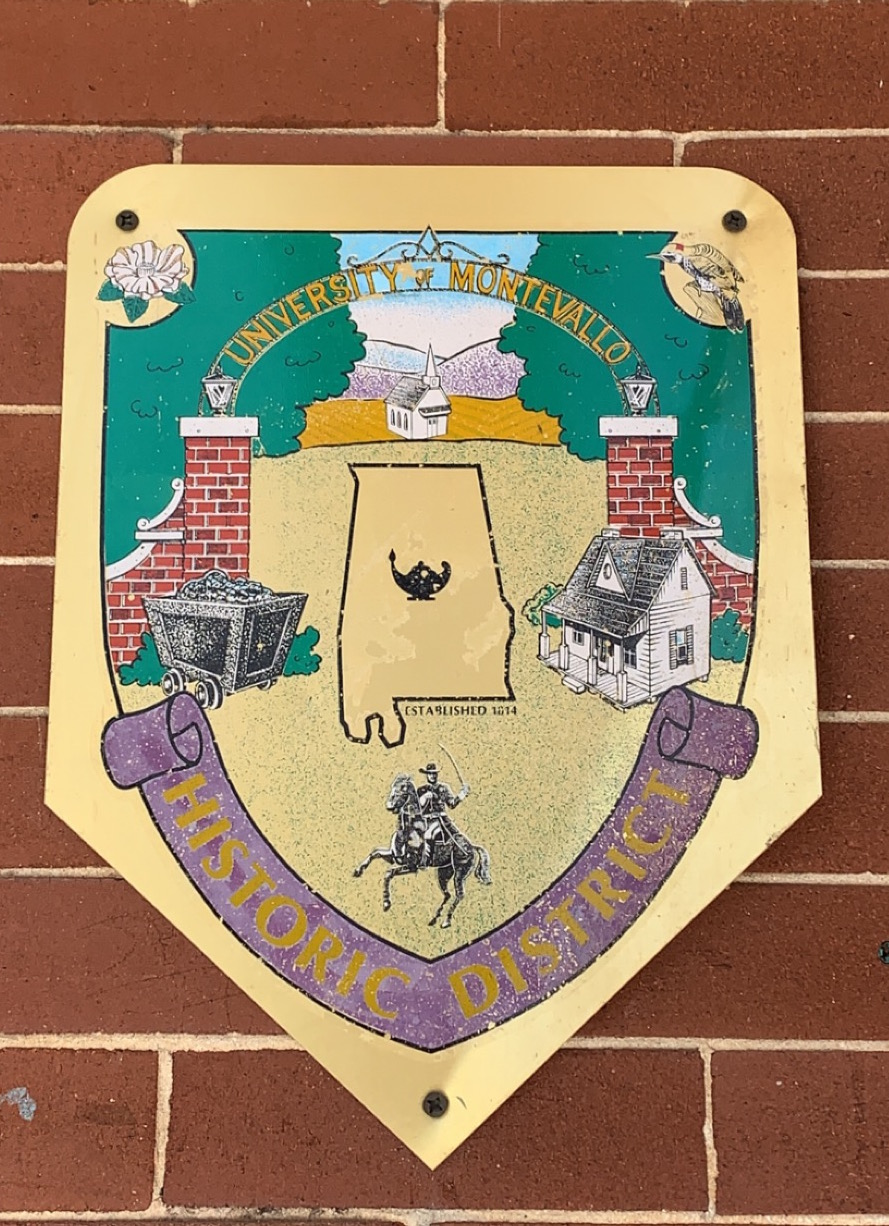
- University of Montevallo Historic District sign

- Location within Alabama Location within the United States
- Location: Roughly bounded by Bloch St., Farmer St., Flowerhill Dr., King St., Valley St., and Middle St., Montevallo, Alabama
- Coordinates: 33.102778°N 86.865833°W
- Area: 62.3 acres (25.2 ha)
- Architectural style: Classical Revival, Bungalow/Craftsman, Greek Revival
- NRHP reference No.: 78000509, 90001529 (boundary increase)

Significant dates
- Added to NRHP: December 11, 1978
- Boundary increase: October 17, 1990

The University of Montevallo Historic District was added to the National Register of Historic Places in December 1978 and originally included 25 acres and 16 structures. These structures made up the core part of the campus and included residence halls, academic buildings, and water towers on campus. The original 16 structures were divided into four categories; Federal Revival style buildings, Greek Revival style buildings, buildings dating from 1897 to 1940, and buildings dating from the 1950s to 1977. In 1990, the Historic District was expanded to include 59 more structures directly surrounding the original Historic District, bringing the total number of structures in the district to 75. The structures added included additional campus buildings, domestic dwellings, a cemetery, and other contributing resources related to the University of Montevallo.

== Original historic district ==
Name	Photo	Date	History	Architectural Style
King House		1823	The King House is the oldest building on campus and was built by slaves owned by Edmund King. The house was heavily restored and renovated in the 1970s by the wife of former UM president Kermit Johnson. It has served as a classroom building, office building, infirmary, and is currently in use as guest house for visitors of the university. It was separately listed on the NRHP in 1972.	Federal Style
Reynolds Hall		1851	Reynolds Hall was the first educational building on campus, and it was also constructed using slave labor. When the University of Montevallo opened on October 12, 1896, Reynolds was the only class building and contained the chapel and president's office as well as classrooms. Today it is used as the theater building and the alumni office.	Greek Revival
Main Hall		1897-1908	Main Hall consists of three wings built at different times. The west wing was built first, in 1897 and housed 100 girls. The central wing was completed in 1907, and the east wing was completed in 1908. The completed building housed 400 girls and is still in use as a residence hall as well as the housing and residence life and health services offices.	Eclecticism
The Tower		1911	The Tower was used as a water tower from its construction until 1962. Since then it has been used as the offices for three student publications; the Alabamian (school newspaper), the Tower (literary magazine), and the Montage (yearbook).	Medieval architecture
Peterson Hall		1913	Peterson Hall was originally constructed as an infirmary with room for 36 patients. It has since been used as the health and counseling center, the communications center, and is now the studio art building.	Georgian architecture
Bloch Hall		1915	Bloch was the first building constructed specifically for the school and was named for Sol D. Bloch, who introduced the bill that created the school. It originally housed all the science classes and is currently used as the art and family and consume sciences building.	Eclectic Classicism
Calkins Hall		1917	Calkins was the University's music building from its construction until 1971. The interior was completely renovated in 1972, after which it became the first building devoted to administration on campus. It is still currently used for administration.	Georgian Revival
Wills Hall		1923	Wills served as the university library from its construction until 1969. Before its construction, books were stored in a variety of places, from the Baptist church to the second floor of Main. it is now home to the College of Education.	Georgian Revival
Ramsay Hall		1925	Ramsay was built using money raised during the school's "Million Dollar Drive" campaign to increase state funding. It was the second dormitory on campus and had room for 200 students. The building underwent renovations in 1979, which converted Ramsay from a dormitory to a conference center and lodge. It is currently once again used as a residence hall, although the first floor still houses several campus offices.	Georgian Revival
Hanson Hall		1929	Hanson Hall was constructed as a dormitory to house 200 students, and it is still in use as a dormitory today.	Georgian Revival
Palmer Hall		1929	Palmer was built to replace Reynolds Hall as a chapel, with an auditorium with seating for 1600 and office spaces. Palmer still serves as an auditorium and office building and also houses College Night, the University's homecoming tradition.	Eclectic Classicism
Tutwiler		1940	Tutwiler was originally used as a dormitory only for seniors, but today houses women of any classification. Tutwiler was one of two buildings constructed on campus using federal WPA funds.	Eclectic Classicism
Water Tower		Late 1950s to early 1960s	Constructed to replace the 1911 water tower, made of steel.	N/A
Water Tower		Late 1950s to early 1960s	additional water tower, also made of steel	N/A
Speech and Hearing Clinic		1972	The Speech and Hearing Clinic houses the Department of Speech Pathology and Audiology and was named after Alabama governor George Wallace	Contemporary style
New Cafeteria		1977	The New Cafeteria was attached to the preexisting Anna Irvin Dining Hall, constructed in 1959–60.	Contemporary style
