= Old Rock House (Harpersville, Alabama) =

Historic house in Alabama, United States

- U.S. National Register of Historic Places
- Alabama Register of Landmarks and Heritage
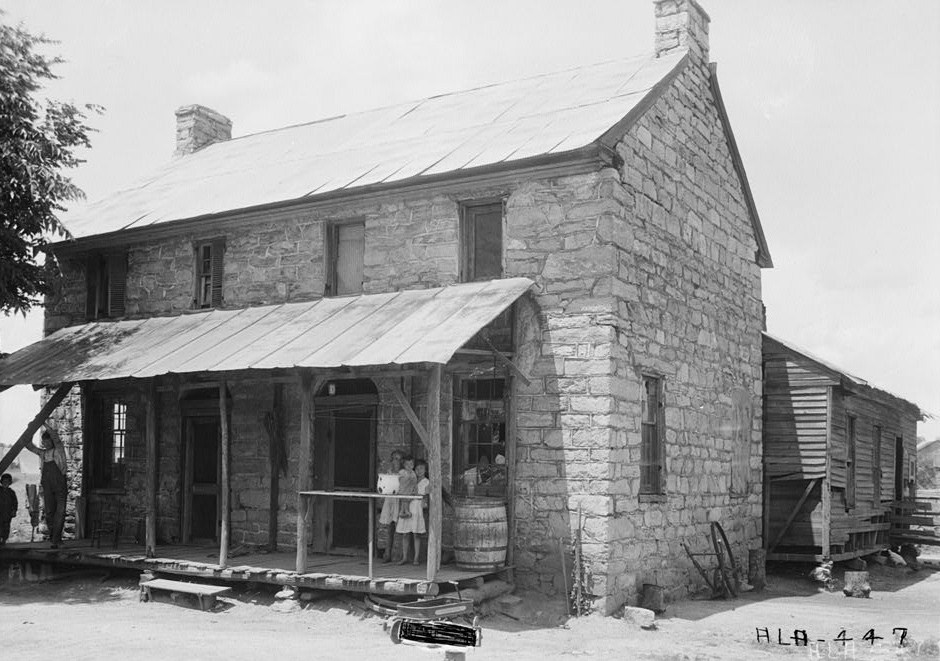

- Location within Alabama Location within the United States
- Location: 1 mile southeast of Harpersville at the end of a farm lane on the northern side of U.S. Route 280
- Coordinates: 33°19′49″N 86°24′27″W
- Area: 0.5 acres (0.20 ha)
- Built: 1835
- Architectural style: Late Georgian, Early Republic
- NRHP reference No.: 06000182

Significant dates
- Added to NRHP: March 29, 2006
- Designated ARLH: December 4, 1992

The Old Rock House is a historic house in Harpersville, Alabama. It was added to the National Register of Historic Places on March 29, 2006. It is located 1 mile southeast of Harpersville at the end of a farm lane on the northern side of U.S. Route 280. The house is built of local grey granite and limestone. The house was previously listed on the Historic American Buildings Survey. The Old Rock House is the only surviving example of an early stone dwelling in Alabama.

== See also ==
- National Register of Historic Places listings in Alabama

== Gallery ==
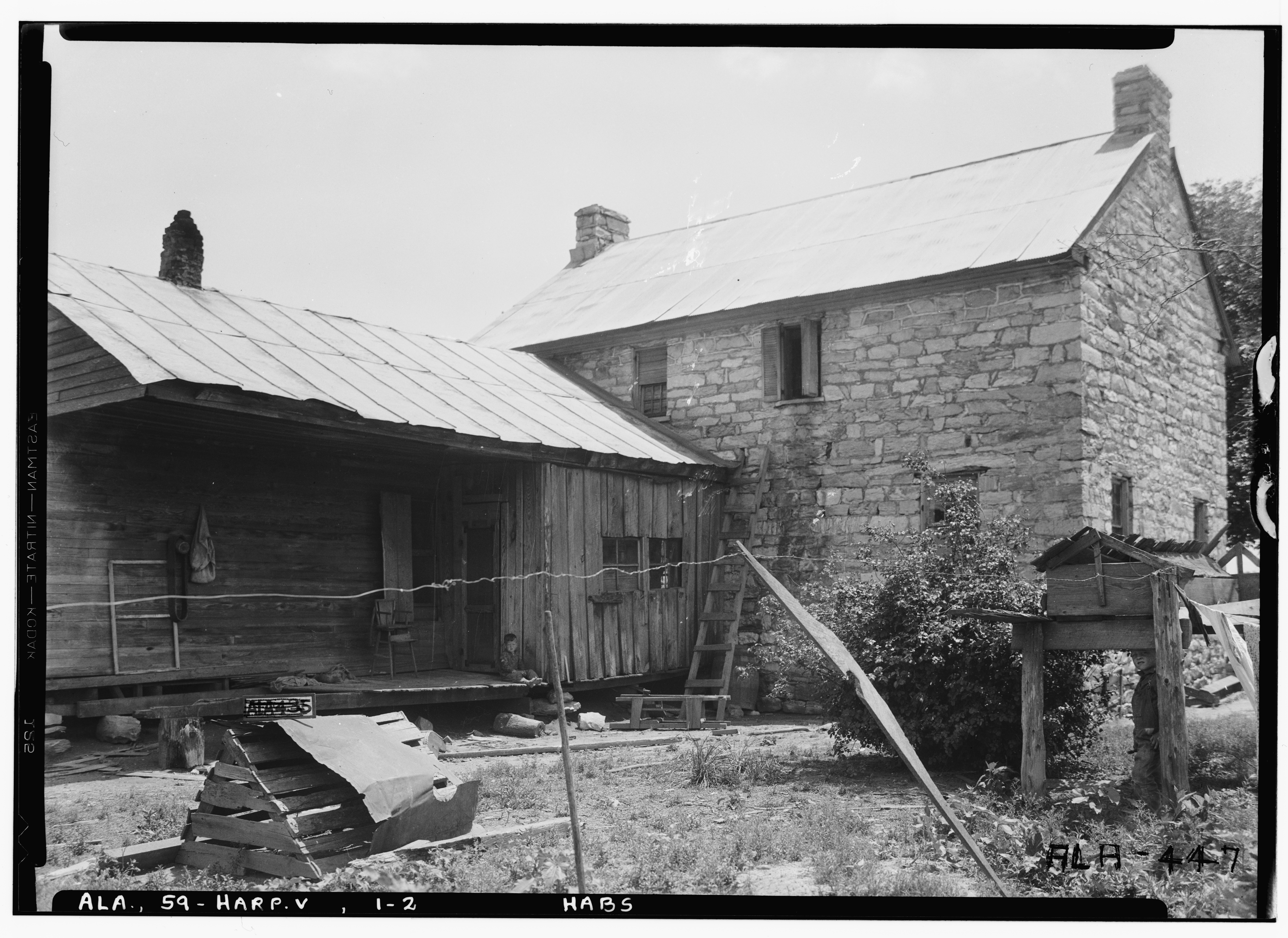
Rear of house

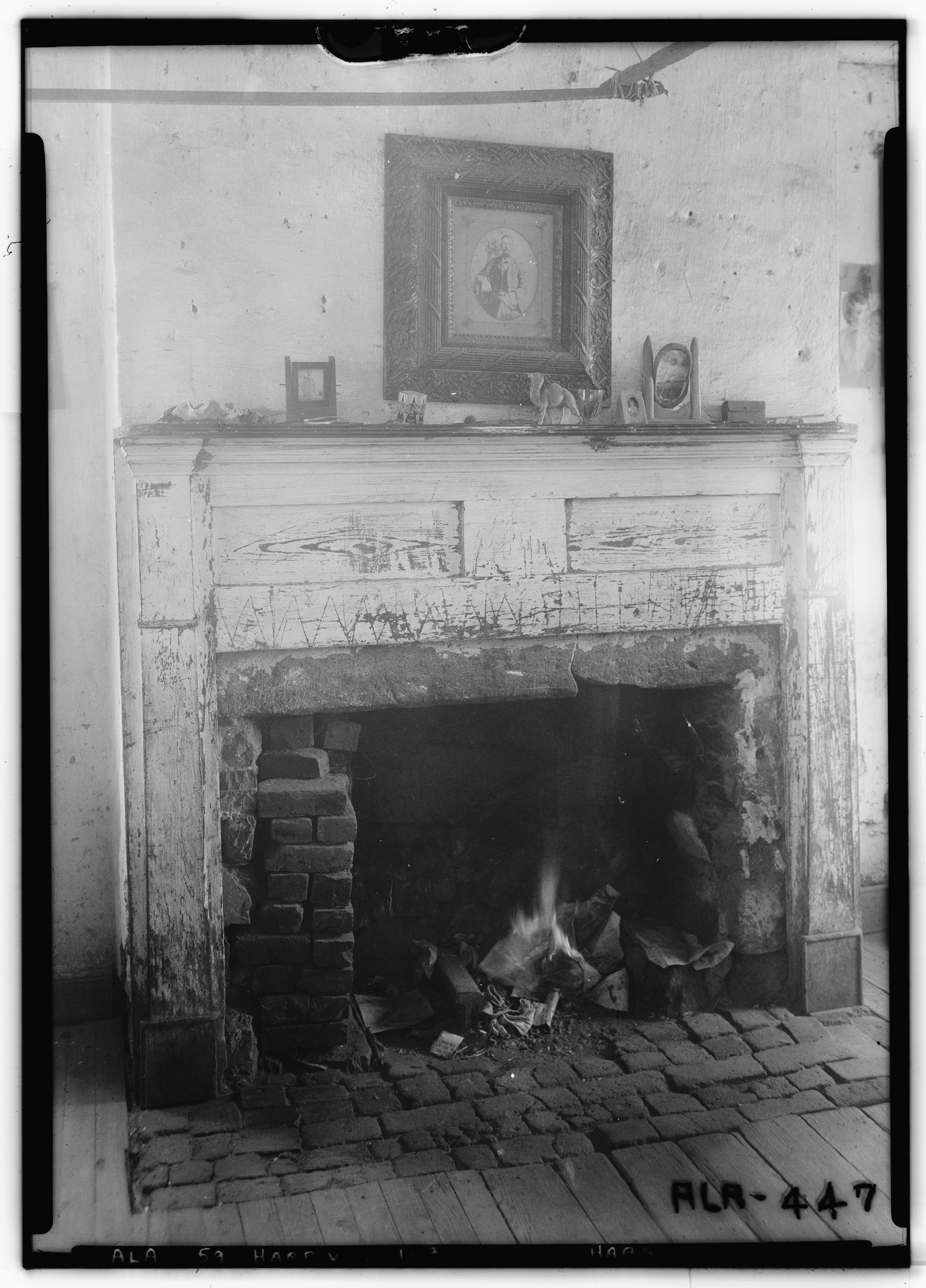
Fireplace
