= Calera Downtown Historic District =

Historic district in Alabama, United States

- U.S. National Register of Historic Places
- Alabama Register of Landmarks and Heritage
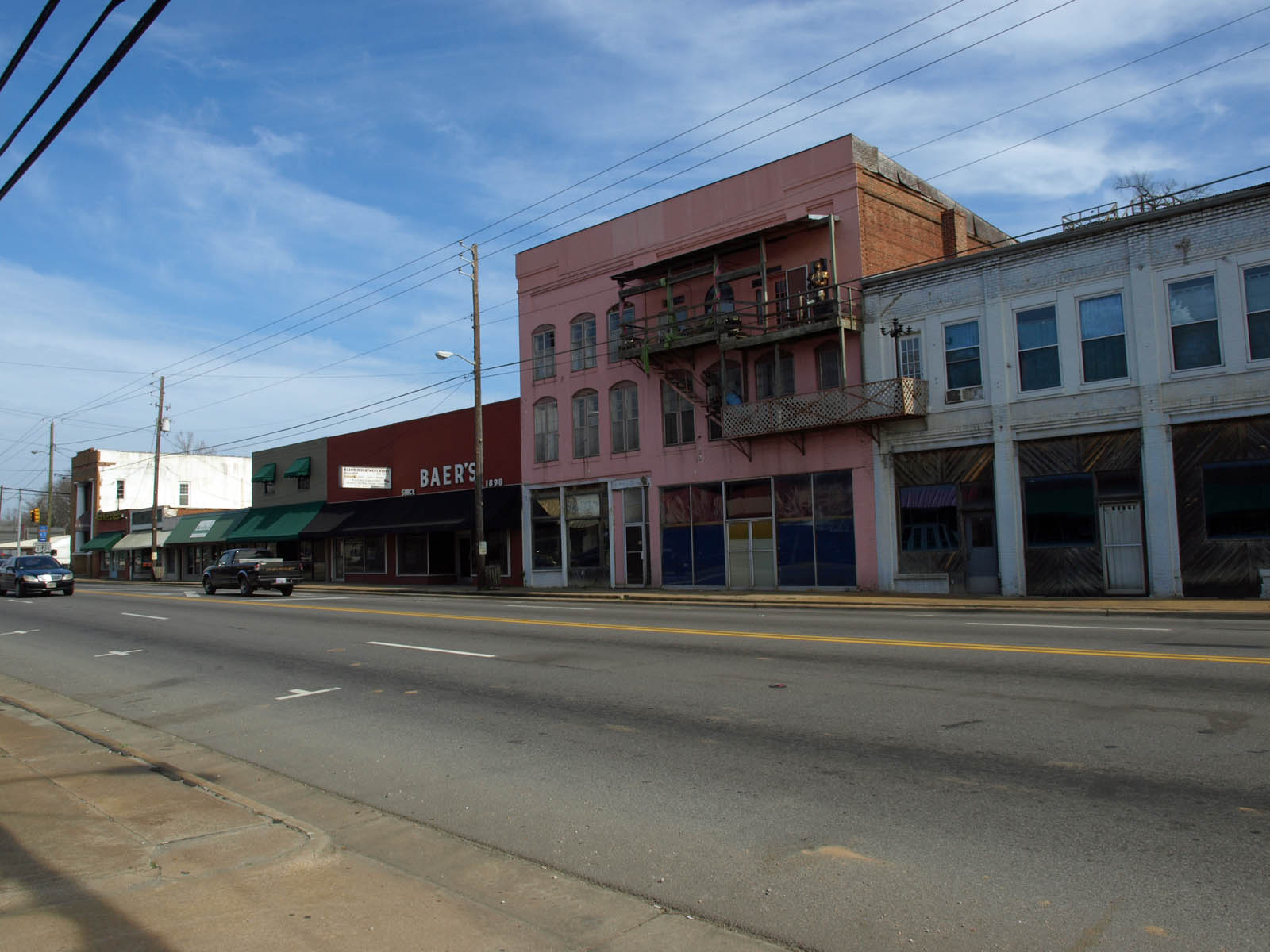

- Location within Alabama
- Location: Jct. of US 31 and AL 25, Calera, Alabama
- Coordinates: 33°06′01″N 86°45′09″W
- Area: 22 acres (8.9 ha)
- NRHP reference No.: 06000188

Significant dates
- Added to NRHP: March 29, 2006
- Designated ARLH: June 24, 2004

The Calera Downtown Historic District, in Calera, Alabama, was listed on the National Register of Historic Places in 2006. The listing included 25 contributing buildings on 22 acres (8.9 ha).

It was deemed significant

for its collection of vernacular commercial structures dating from the late-nineteenth to the mid-twentieth centuries, including good examples of one- and two-part commercial blocks, temple-front and free-standing commercial buildings. Together these structures depict the evolution of the community from its days as an early industrial town to its growth as a transportation center. They reflect the variety of opportunities available in the community, offering to meet every need of the citizenry. From banking to groceries, to dry goods, to shoe repair, to entertainment, to socialization, automobile service, and accommodation—all were available in the two-block area of the community.

It is located at the junction of U.S. Route 31 and State Route 25.
