= Cahaba River Wildlife Management Area =

Protected area in Alabama, United States

- William R. Ireland, Sr. - Cahaba River Wildlife Management Area
- IUCN category V (protected landscape/seascape)
- Location within Alabama Location within the United States
- Location: West Blocton, Alabama, US
- Coordinates: 33°7′7″N 87°7′22″W
- Area: 41,500 acres (168 km^{2})
- Governing body: Alabama Department of Conservation and Natural Resources

The Cahaba River Wildlife Management Area is an Alabama Wildlife Management Area (WMA) operated by the Alabama Department of Conservation and Natural Resources in Bibb and Shelby Counties near West Blocton, Alabama. The WMA is most notable for the long stretch of free-flowing Cahaba River within its boundaries. Uses of the WMA include large (deer and turkey) and small (squirrel, rabbit, etc.) game hunting, fishing, biking, hiking, and wildlife photography.
