= McKibbon House =

Historic house in Alabama, United States

- U.S. National Register of Historic Places
- Alabama Register of Landmarks and Heritage
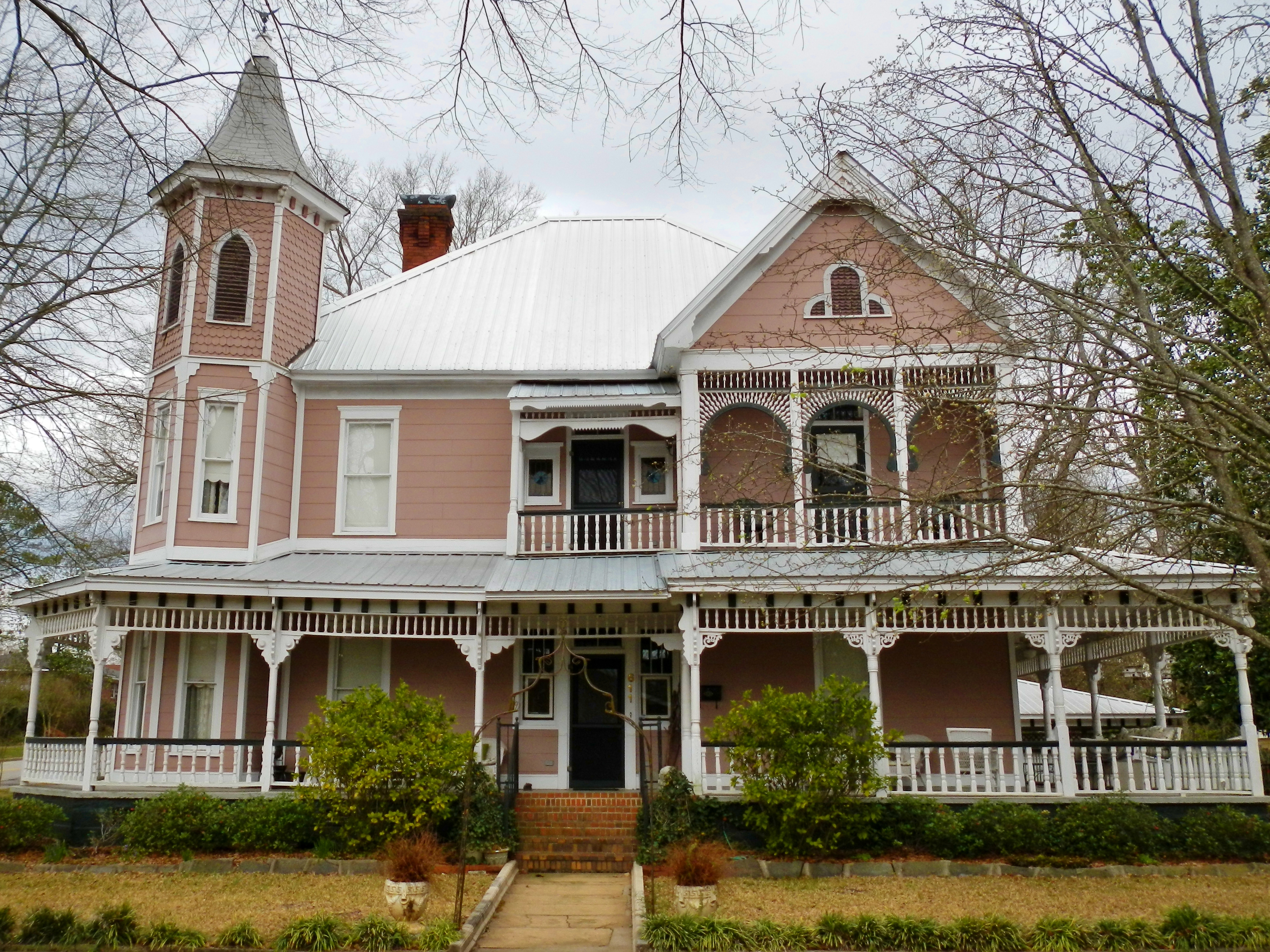
- The McKibbon House in 2012

- Location within Alabama
- Location: 611 East Boundary Street, Montevallo, Alabama
- Coordinates: 33°5′51″N 86°51′42″W
- Area: 0.5 acres (0.20 ha)
- Built: 1900
- Architectural style: Queen Anne
- NRHP reference No.: 01001408

Significant dates
- Added to NRHP: December 31, 2001
- Designated ARLH: July 21, 1978

McKibbon House is a historic mansion in Montevallo, Alabama, U.S.

== History ==
The house was built for Robert Fulton McKibbon in 1900, and designed in the Queen Anne architectural style. It served as a meeting place for the Montevallo Presbyterian Church, as Fulton was a staunch Presbyterian. In 1944, it was purchased by J. W. D. Galloway, only to be purchased by Melvin T. Smitherman in 1952. It was purchased by Leonard Lawley in 1968.

== Architectural significance ==
The house has been listed on the Alabama Register of Landmarks and Heritage since 1978, and on the National Register of Historic Places since December 31, 2001.
