= Harpersville, Alabama =

- Town
- Flag Logo
- Nickname: Big Springs
- Motto(s): "Rich Past, Bright Future!"
- Location of Harpersville in Shelby County, Alabama.
- Coordinates: 33°19′06″N 86°25′43″W
- Country: United States
- State: Alabama
- County: Shelby

Area
  - Total: 21.64 sq mi (56.06 km^{2})
  - Land: 21.29 sq mi (55.15 km^{2})
  - Water: 0.35 sq mi (0.91 km^{2})
- Elevation: 430 ft (130 m)

Population (2020)
  - Total: 1,614
  - Density: 75.8/sq mi (29.27/km^{2})
- Time zone: UTC-6 (CST)
  - Summer (DST): UTC-5 (CDT)
- ZIP code: 35078
- Area codes: 205, 659
- FIPS code: 01-33256
- GNIS feature ID: 2406645
- Website: City Website

Harpersville is a town in eastern Shelby County, Alabama, United States. According to the 1950 U.S. Census, it formally incorporated in 1943. At the 2020 census the population was 1,614, compared to 1,637 in 2010 and 1,620 in 2000. It is located southeast of the Birmingham metro area.

== History ==
Harpersville was settled just after the War of 1812 ended. It was originally called Big Springs.

Harpersville Municipal Court has been effectively taken over by Circuit Court Judge Hub Harrington as of July 13, 2012, in a case regarding Private probation. His order characterizes the municipal court as a debtors' prison and extortion racket condoned by the elected officials of Harpersville and Judicial Correction Services.

Harpersville has two structures which are listed on the National Register of Historic Places, the Chancellor House and the Old Rock House.

== Geography ==
According to the U.S. Census Bureau, the town has a total area of 15.9 square miles (41 km^{2}), of which 15.9 square miles (41 km^{2}) is land and 0.06% is water.

The town is located at the intersection of US Routes 280 and 231. US 280 runs east to west through the town, leading west 12 mi (19 km) to Chelsea and 30 mi (48 km) to downtown Birmingham. US 280 and 231 run southeast together 7 mi (11 km) to Childersburg. US 231 runs northeast 21 mi (34 km) to Pell City.

== Demographics ==
Historical population
Census	Pop.	Note	%±
1880	194		—
1950	348		—
1960	667		91.7%
1970	639		−4.2%
1980	934		46.2%
1990	772		−17.3%
2000	1,620		109.8%
2010	1,637		1.0%
2020	1,614		−1.4%
U.S. Decennial Census; 2013 Estimate

=== Racial and ethnic composition ===
Harpersville town, Alabama – Racial and ethnic composition Note: the US Census treats Hispanic/Latino as an ethnic category. This table excludes Latinos from the racial categories and assigns them to a separate category. Hispanics/Latinos may be of any race.
Race / Ethnicity (NH = Non-Hispanic)	Pop 2000	Pop 2010	Pop 2020	% 2000	% 2010	% 2020
White alone (NH)	1,123	1,172	1,207	69.32%	71.59%	74.78%
Black or African American alone (NH)	463	384	301	28.58%	23.46%	18.65%
Native American or Alaska Native alone (NH)	8	5	5	0.49%	0.31%	0.31%
Asian alone (NH)	11	11	2	0.68%	0.67%	0.12%
Native Hawaiian or Pacific Islander alone (NH)	0	0	0	0.00%	0.00%	0.00%
Other race alone (NH)	0	0	9	0.00%	0.00%	0.56%
Mixed race or Multiracial (NH)	5	22	55	0.31%	1.34%	3.41%
Hispanic or Latino (any race)	10	43	35	0.62%	2.63%	2.17%
Total	1,620	1,637	1,614	100.00%	100.00%	100.00%

=== 2020 census ===
As of the 2020 census, Harpersville had a population of 1,614. The median age was 44.7 years. 19.8% of residents were under the age of 18 and 19.8% of residents were 65 years of age or older. For every 100 females there were 93.8 males, and for every 100 females age 18 and over there were 91.3 males age 18 and over.

0.0% of residents lived in urban areas, while 100.0% lived in rural areas.

There were 632 households in Harpersville, of which 31.2% had children under the age of 18 living in them. Of all households, 50.3% were married-couple households, 15.8% were households with a male householder and no spouse or partner present, and 28.6% were households with a female householder and no spouse or partner present. About 22.0% of all households were made up of individuals and 10.6% had someone living alone who was 65 years of age or older. There were 433 families residing in the town.

There were 689 housing units, of which 8.3% were vacant. The homeowner vacancy rate was 0.8% and the rental vacancy rate was 11.8%.

=== 2010 Census ===
As of the census of 2010, there were 1,637 people, 620 households, and 456 families residing in the town. The population density was 103.0 inhabitants per square mile (39.8/km^{2}). There were 708 housing units at an average density of 44.5 per square mile (17.2/km^{2}). The racial makeup of the town was 73.1% White, 23.5% Black or African American, 0.3% Native American, 0.7% Asian, 1.0% from other races, and 1.3% from two or more races. 2.6% of the population were Hispanic or Latino of any race.

There were 620 households, out of which 26.5% had children under the age of 18 living with them, 51.5% were married couples living together, 16.9% had a female householder with no husband present, and 26.5% were non-families. 21.1% of all households were made up of individuals, and 9.3% had someone living alone who was 65 years of age or older. The average household size was 2.64 and the average family size was 3.09.

In the town, the population was spread out, with 23.1% under the age of 18, 8.9% from 18 to 24, 22.9% from 25 to 44, 30.2% from 45 to 64, and 14.8% who were 65 years of age or older. The median age was 41.7 years. For every 100 females, there were 91.5 males. For every 100 females age 18 and over, there were 95.0 males.

The median income for a household in the town was $37,768, and the median income for a family was $42,065. Males had a median income of $43,301 versus $32,434 for females. The per capita income for the town was $20,170. About 23.9% of families and 28.4% of the population were below the poverty line, including 55.3% of those under age 18 and 23.4% of those age 65 or over.

=== 2000 Census ===
As of the census of 2000, there were 1,620 people, 610 households, and 458 families residing in the town. The population density was 102.0 inhabitants per square mile (39.4/km^{2}). There were 685 housing units at an average density of 43.1 per square mile (16.6/km^{2}). The racial makeup of the town was 69.57% White, 28.70% Black or African American, 0.49% Native American, 0.68% Asian, 0.25% from other races, and 0.31% from two or more races. 0.62% of the population were Hispanic or Latino of any race.

There were 610 households, out of which 33.9% had children under the age of 18 living with them, 57.4% were married couples living together, 14.8% had a female householder with no husband present, and 24.8% were non-families. 21.8% of all households were made up of individuals, and 9.2% had someone living alone who was 65 years of age or older. The average household size was 2.66 and the average family size was 3.10.

In the town, the population was spread out, with 27.3% under the age of 18, 7.5% from 18 to 24, 30.0% from 25 to 44, 23.0% from 45 to 64, and 12.3% who were 65 years of age or older. The median age was 37 years. For every 100 females, there were 93.5 males. For every 100 females age 18 and over, there were 87.6 males.

The median income for a household in the town was $31,655, and the median income for a family was $34,632. Males had a median income of $28,839 versus $22,069 for females. The per capita income for the town was $12,783. About 17.4% of families and 19.3% of the population were below the poverty line, including 23.6% of those under age 18 and 24.1% of those age 65 or over.

== School ==
The town of Harpersville does not have public schools within town limits. All public matriculated students attend schools in the adjacent town of Vincent.

Coosa Valley Academy, part of the Alabama Independent School Association, serves as one of the private schools in the town of Harpersville. The doors of the school first opened in 1970 where it has served the community for 50 years. The School's mission statement says, "The vision of Coosa Valley Academy is to provide a college preparatory education in a safe and orderly Christian environment that will instill in each student the desire to fulfill his or her greatest academic potential while encouraging mutual respect among students and staff in order to prepare well-rounded individuals for success in life". Education is available for students in grades from Pre-Kindergarten through Twelfth grade. Dual enrollment programs are available for students in grades 10-12 allowing them the opportunity to take online classes at Troy University to earn college credits. A variety of clubs are available for student participation consisting of Athletics, Beta Club, Cheerleading Squad, Dance Team, Fellowship of Christian Athletes, History Club, Spanish Club, Student Government Association, and Ignite Club. Athletics available are baseball, basketball, football, soccer, softball, and volleyball. The current enrollment at Coosa Valley Academy stands at 250 students under supervision of 22 teachers. The student teacher ratio stands at 11:1 which grants educators the ability to work closely with the students.

== Notable people ==
- Warren Kidd, NBA Player
- George McGinnis, NBA Player
- William Joseph Simmons, founder of the second Ku Klux Klan
- Henry B. Walthall, Actor - Star on Hollywood Walk of Fame

== Landmarks ==
- Klein-Wallace Home
- Datcher Family Farm Museum

== Gallery ==
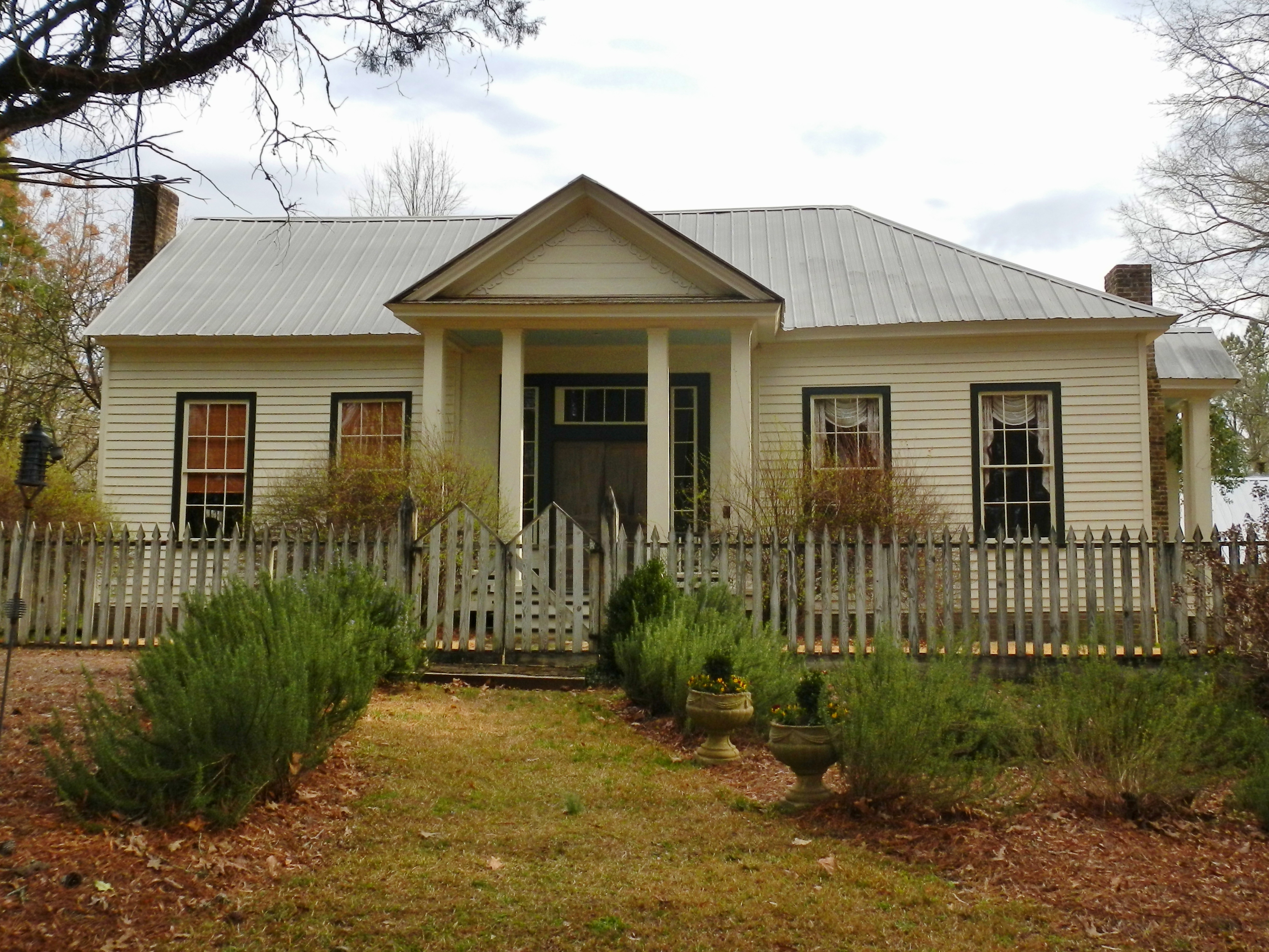
Chancellor House

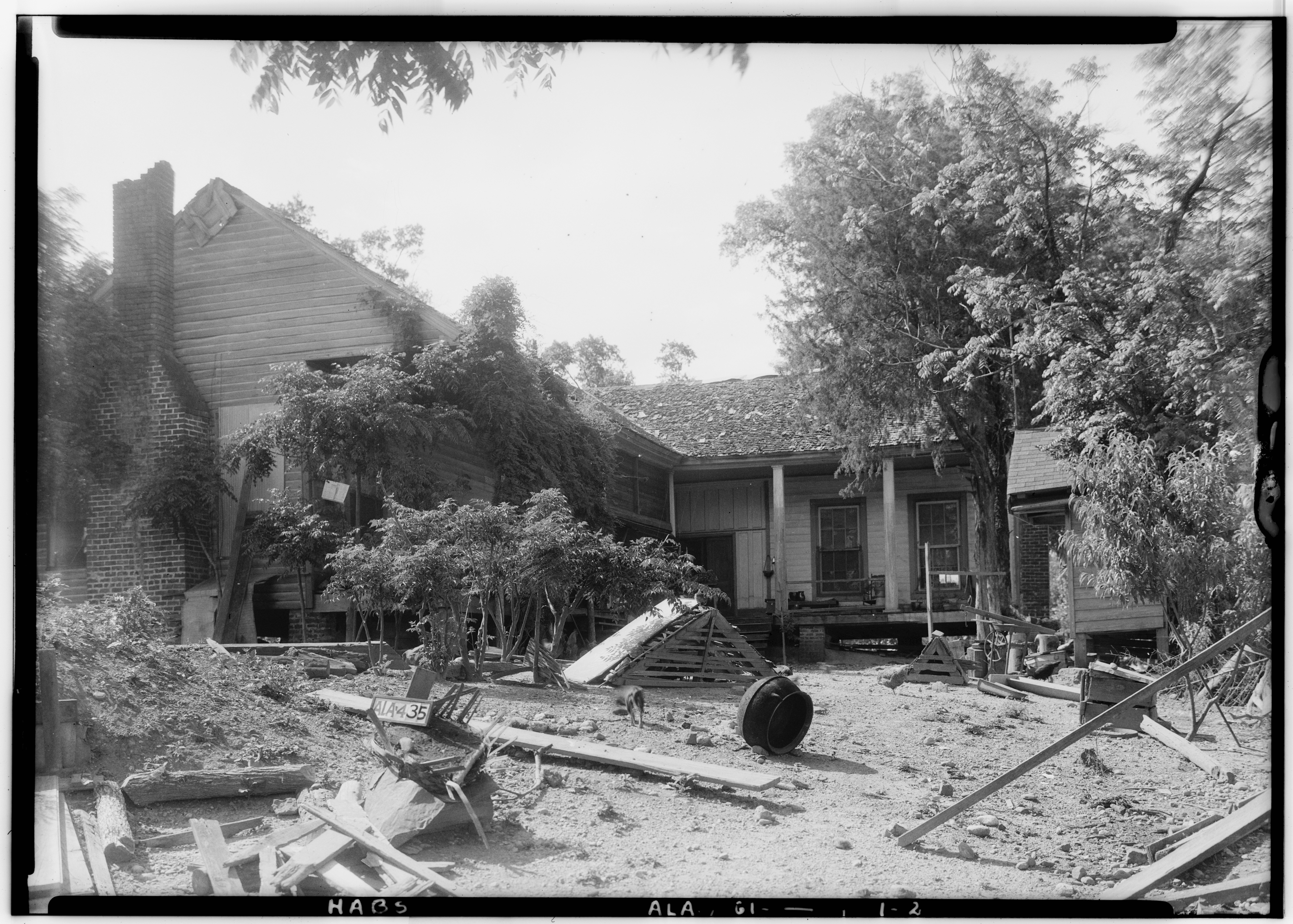
Chancellor House from rear

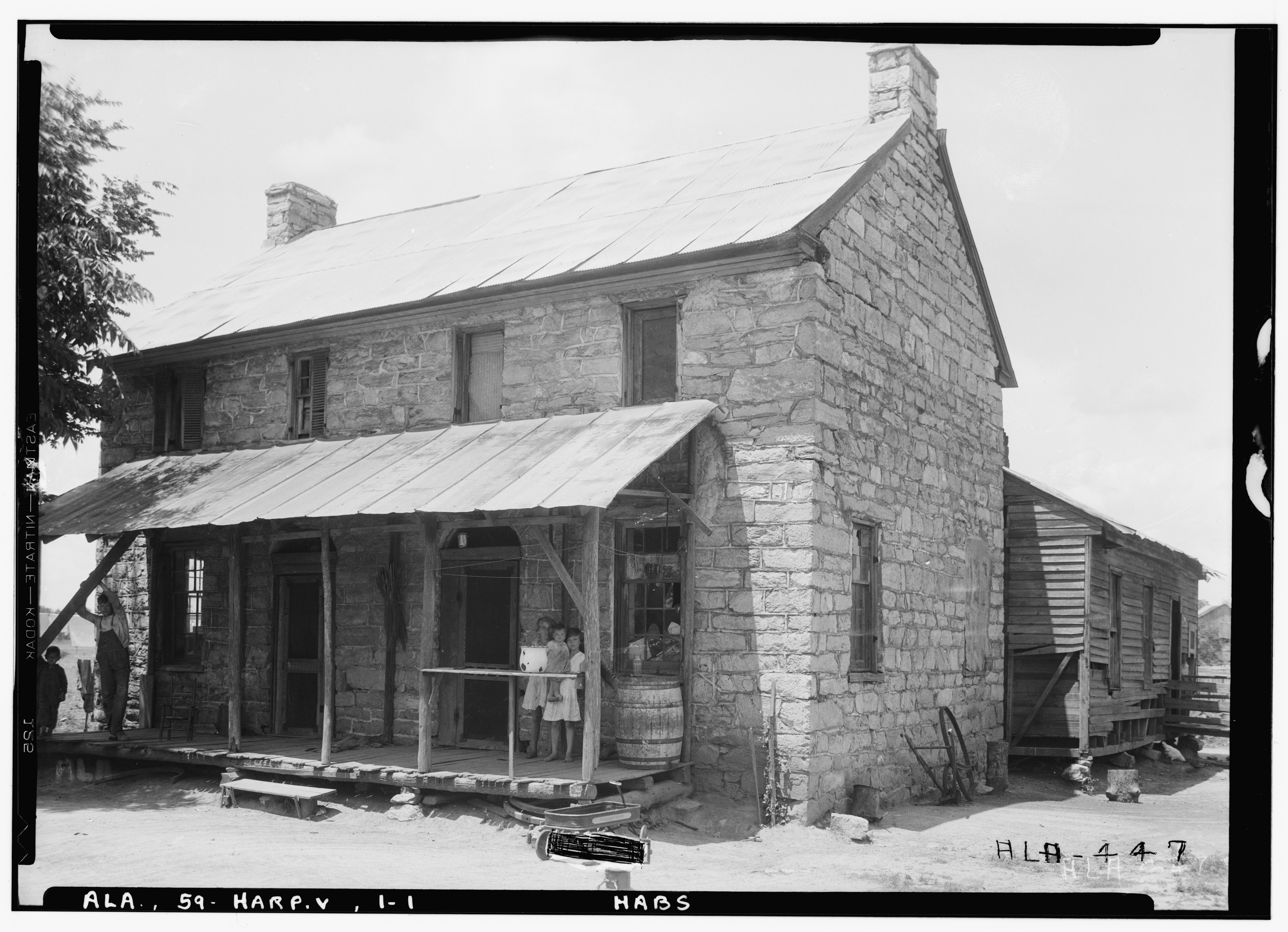
Old Rock House

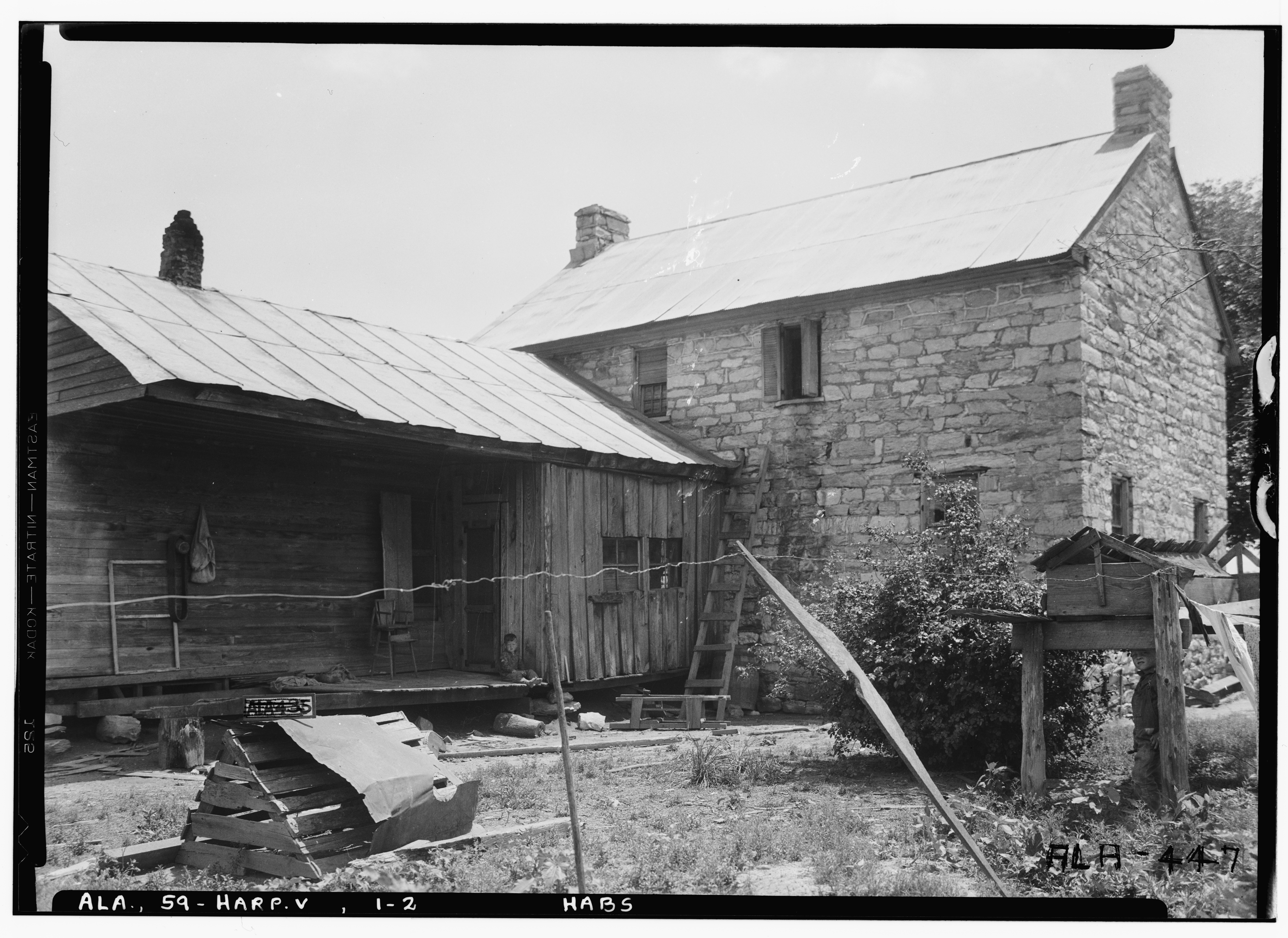
Old Rock House from rear
