= Edmund King House =

- King House
- U.S. National Register of Historic Places
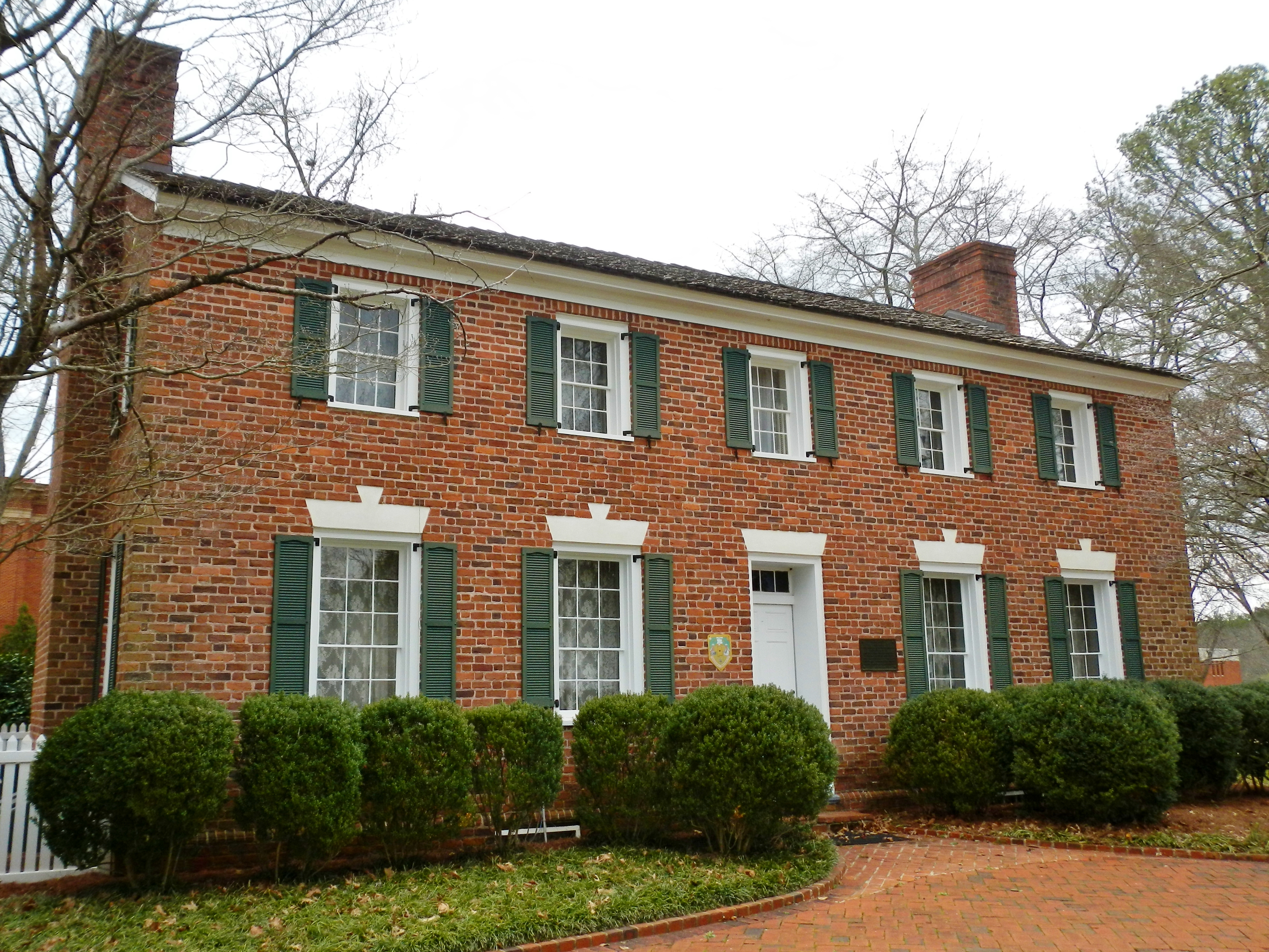
- The house in February 2012

- Location within Alabama Location within the United States
- Location: University of Montevallo campus, Montevallo, Alabama
- Coordinates: 33°6′18″N 86°51′47″W
- Area: 1.9 acres (0.77 ha)
- Built: 1823
- Architectural style: Federal
- NRHP reference No.: 72000179
- Added to NRHP: January 14, 1972

The Edmund King House is a historic residence on the campus of the University of Montevallo in Montevallo, Alabama. The house was built by Edmund King, a native Virginian who arrived in Alabama in 1817. First building a log cabin, he built the house in 1823. After becoming a successful planter and businessman, he donated land for churches, roads, and schools, including for the Alabama Girls Industrial School (today known as the University of Montevallo). Upon his death in 1863, the house passed to a son-in-law, and was deeded to the Industrial School in 1908. The house has been used as a classroom, an office building, an infirmary, a home economics practice home, and a summer home for male students. Today, the home is used as a guest house for visitors to the University.

The Federal-style house is two stories, and built of brick laid in English bond. The central main entrance is topped with a four-light transom. The entrance and flanking windows are spanned with flat, flared arches which are stuccoed to resemble stone. Windows on the ground floor are nine-over-six sashes, with six-over-six sashes on the upper floor. The interior is a center-hall plan, with two rooms on either side of a central hallway on both floors. Each room contains an Adamesque fireplace mantel. The exterior was stuccoed and scored to imitate stone in the mid-19th century, and a front portico and rear ell were also later additions. These features were removed in a 1973–74 restoration.

The house was listed on the National Register of Historic Places in 1972.
