= Alternatives to imprisonment =

Types of punishment or treatment other than time in prison

US incarceration timeline

The alternatives to imprisonment are types of punishment or treatment other than time in prison that can be given to a person who is convicted of committing a crime. Some of these are also known as alternative sanctions. Alternatives can take the form of fines, restorative justice, transformative justice or no punishment at all. Capital punishment, corporal punishment and electronic monitoring are also alternatives to imprisonment, but are not promoted by modern prison reform movements for decarceration due to them being carceral in nature.

Reformers generally seek to reduce prison populations and make increased use of alternatives with a focus on rehabilitation. The main arguments for this are that these responses reduce the chance of reoffending, reduce cost burdens on the state and reduce prison overcrowding.

== Arguments for alternatives ==
Academic studies are inconclusive as to whether high imprisonment rates reduce crime rates in comparison to low imprisonment rates. While they at least remove offenders from the community, there is little evidence that prisons can rehabilitate offenders or deter crime. Some inmates are at risk of being drawn further into crime. They may make friends with other criminals, have their medical or mental health needs neglected or endure further abuse from other prisoners and even staff. If the prisoner is a parent, the family will suffer from the parent's absence. Released prisoners commonly have difficulty finding work and earning a legal income. As a result, most countries have high recidivism rates. In the United States, 67.8% of released prisoners are rearrested within three years and 76.6% are rearrested within five years.

Prison reformers argue in favor of reducing prison populations, mainly through reducing the number of those imprisoned for minor crimes. A key goal is to improve conditions by reducing overcrowding. Prison reformers also argue that alternative methods are often better at rehabilitating offenders and preventing crime in the long term.

== Alternative ==
=== Periodic detention ===
Periodic detention is a type of custodial sentence under which the offender is held in prison periodically, for example between Friday and Sunday evenings each week, but is at liberty at other times. Promoted by prison reformers as an alternative to imprisonment, periodic detention drew praise for allowing offenders to continue working, maintain family relationships, and avoid associating with more dangerous criminals in traditional prisons. It was also considerably less expensive to administer.

=== Addressing crimes involving sexual offenders ===
Although there have been changes in the way sex offenders are treated in the last twenty years, there is a need to differentiate between the different types rather than placing them in the same box. By using a compassionate approach, possible sex offenders (those addicted to pornographic images, for example) might seek help before they commit any kind of crime. Therefore, some argue that sex offending needs to be seen within a public health framework rather than a criminal justice one.

=== Alternatives for minors ===
It is crucial to understand how alternatives to incarceration or detention for minors are developed and implemented. Investigations show that incarceration and education are closely associated. Restorative justice in the forms of boot camps and military programs adopted into public education options is starting to be considered. A variety of programs for anger management, self-esteem, etc. have been developed and those working with academics are called upon to develop such alternatives. It is shown that people in society are willing to pay for rehabilitation for juvenile offenders as opposed to other forms of punishment. Kentucky has passed a bill in which the state encourages community-based treatment over detention for juveniles. Some of the measures introduced early intervention process, evidence-based tools for screening and assessing juveniles, or placed limits on the maximum out-of-home placement time.

Nancy Stein emphasizes on deinstitutionalizing young people by creating community-based alternatives. Many of these alternative programs in which Stein suggests are ones that are started by the community as they want to reduce the percentage of adolescents being institutionalized. One of the community programs is the Omega Boys Club where their goal is to build relationships with young people and help them make wise decisions in life. As a result, the Omega Boys Club has contributed in decreasing the rate of juvenile crime. This article shows that there are many people committed in lowering crime rates within their communities and will do whatever they can to help keep the future leaders of our nation out of trouble. The constant involvement with youth in these not well off communities is what John Brown Childs believes as "youth who actively work for peace and against violence as the inspiration for strategic direction and community rebirth." Thus more community based alternatives to incarceration can help to lower the number of people in prison.

==== Family involvement ====
Family Group Conferences have been used in New Zealand since 1989 as part of both the youth justice and the care and protection process for children to address offending by children and young people as well as child abuse.

=== Alternatives for drug users ===
Despite the efforts of organization groups, such as the American Bar Association, in promoting alternatives to imprisonment, they seem to be ignored when it comes to the federal government. Some alternatives introduced in this article include confinement, community service, tracking devices, and expanded terms in halfway houses. Some other ideas include an increase in supervision for a decrease in time as an alternative to long-term imprisonment. This technically would not be an alternative to incarceration, but rather to full-term supervision. There are often cases such as with parents and drug abusers that need special attention and aren't so easy to incarcerate. Some argue that for less dangerous criminals, treatment facilities should be the first option. The Residential Drug Abuse Program helps inmates addicted to drugs get released early through the overcoming of their own addictions.

=== Restorative justice ===
Native American communities, particularly reservations in the United States and Canada, have had a reputation for high crime rates. Restorative justice is an important alternative to prison in these communities. Native Americans are largely overrepresented in Western penal systems, and are moving towards self-determination in administering restorative justice to their communities. Some alternatives that have been suggested are community-based programs, participation in Western sentencing circles, and re-institution of traditional corporal punishment. A successful example of this is the Miyo Wahkotowin Community Education Authority, which uses restorative techniques at the three Emineskin Cree nation schools it operates in Alberta, Canada. The Authority has a special Sohki program which has a coordinator work with students with "behavioral issues" rather than punish them and has had successful results.

== Alternative programs by location ==
=== Canada ===
In the Community Based Alternatives to Incarceration in Canada, Richard M. Zubrycki argues that by "the Canadian criminal justice system supporting the safe use of community alternatives (there would be a significant decrease) in the prison populations" (Zubrycki). He discusses mainly about community alternatives such as first time offenders receiving intervention that would help them not to commit the crime again. Another successful alternative is the Canadian government provides families with family group counseling; this is significant because it builds a stronger- closely connected support group that helps to decrease the chances of that person committing the crime again. Canada has also researched and tried to understand what Community Program works best for different types of crime offenders. From their research and perseverance "today their prison population is low and is dropping" (Zubrycki, Community Based Alternatives to incarceration in Canada).

=== United States ===
In the United States, Law Enforcement Assisted Diversion (LEAD) is a model framework that provides police with an alternative to criminal prosecution in cases involving low-level crimes related to drug use, mental health issues, and poverty. The multi-agency approach allows police officers to refer individuals to behavioral health services rather than arrest them. The model was developed in Seattle, Washington, where a pilot program was launched in 2011. LEAD programs have since been adopted nationally in the US.

==== New York ====
New York City, the largest city in the United States, has an Alternatives to Incarceration (AIP) program, a collection of nonprofit-run diversion programs that judges can use as an alternative sentence for those convicted of some misdemeanors or felonies. The program has four categories: general population, substance abusers, women, and youth. The program has a 60% success rate. Offenders who fail the program receive a mandatory prison sentence. Those who don't succeed tend to have a past with incarceration.

== See also ==
- Incarceration in the United States
- Decarceration in the United States
- Electronic monitoring in the United States
- List of U.S. state prisons
- Mandatory sentencing
- Carceral state
- Retributive justice
- Corrections Corporation of America
- War on drugs
- Homeland Security
- Private prison
- Federal Prison
