= Lifetime probation =

Punishment for relatively serious legal offenders

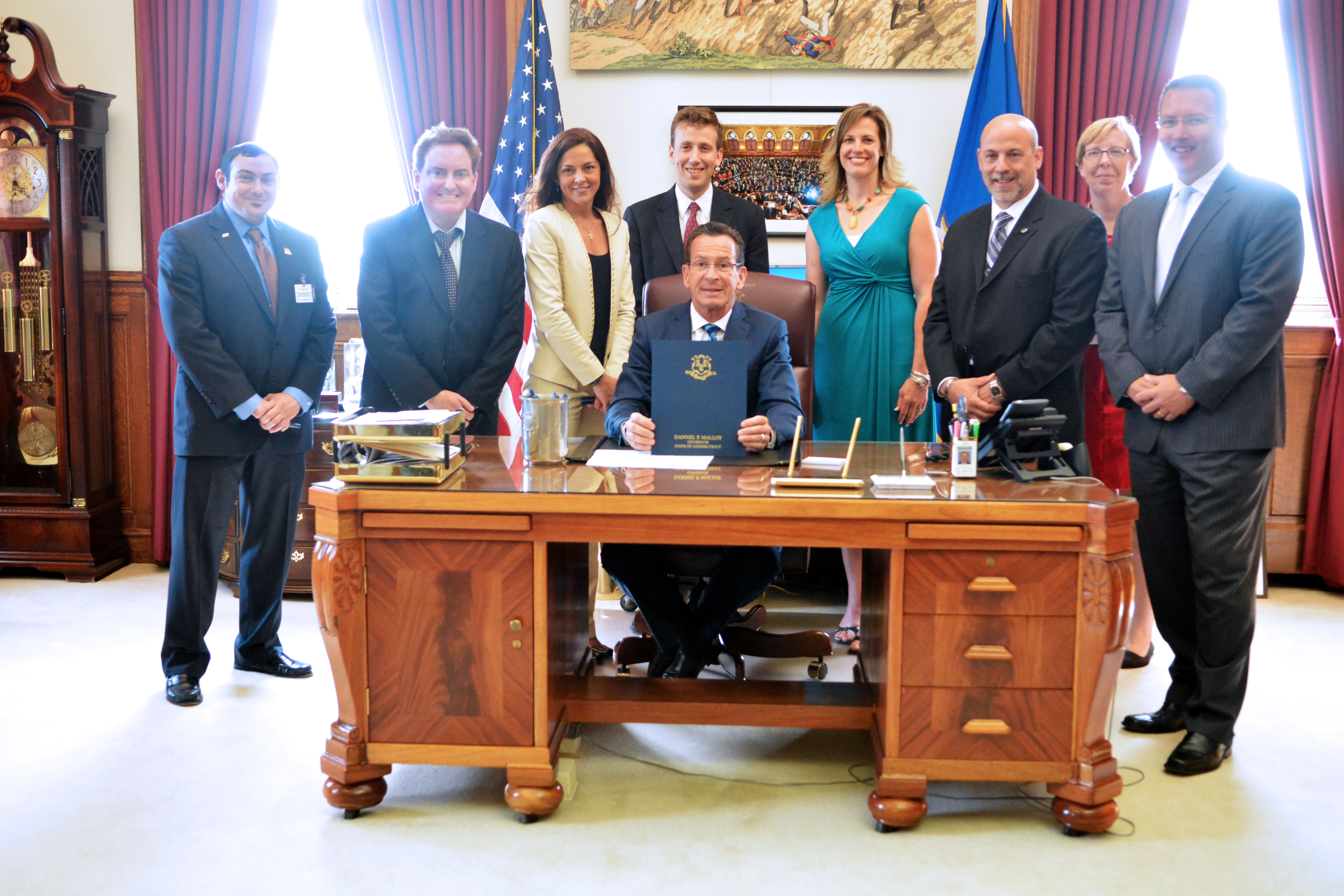
Probation officers

Lifetime probation (or probation for life [in the US state of Georgia], parole for life, lifelong parole, lifetime parole, lifelong probation, or life term probation) is reserved for relatively serious legal offenders. The ultimate purpose of lifetime probation is to examine whether offenders properly maintain good behavior as well as capability of patience under lifetime probation serving circumstance. An offender is required to abide by particular conditions for rest of their entire life in order to nurture superior social behaviour as a punishment for their criminal offence. Condition of probation orders contain supervision, electronic tagging, reporting to his or her probation or parole officer, as well as attending counselling. The essential component of lifetime probation carries the sense of being examined for well-being character and behaviour for life term period. Legislative framework regarding probation may vary depending on the country or the state within a certain country as well as the duration and condition of probational sentencing.

== Legislative framework ==
Federal Criminal Legislative Framework

Legislation or criminal law regarding probation and parole may differ depending on the country or more specifically the state. Generally, probation refers to community-based supervision directly ordered by the court for the significant object of fulfilling incarcerated sentence. On the other hand, parole is defined as periodical conditional release from the prison in the community to be supervised as for well-being and rehabilitation. Criminal law about the probation and parole normally contain sentencing practice, decision-making process, probational characteristics as well as benefits from probational services through distinguishable sections of information.

=== United States ===
Probation in the United States is defined as a directed-order of community-based supervision given by the court, in general as a substitution to incarceration and it is the most common scheme of criminal sentencing in the US. Bureau of Justice Statistics issued the report which evidently reveals 4,537,100 adults in the United States were under community supervision in 2016 along with decrease of almost 50,000 defendants in probation or parole from the beginning of 2016. The statistics effectively prove that 1 out of 55 American citizens were serving to the community under conditional release of under supervision at the end of 2016.

New York State Senate, Elizabeth Little, approved legislation in 2006 which would require more intensive monitoring of level three sex offenders which includes lifetime probation as well as annual polygraphs as a condition of their release from prison. Sen. Better Little says "current law essentially provides information regarding sex offenders' activity, but more aggressive monitoring would contribute to the superior public security." Also, Little commented that communicating with a probation officer on regular basis and submission to polygraph once a year would result better outcome of micro-monitoring of offenders' activity. Little's proposal also suggested that convicted felony wearing a Global Positioning System (GPS) tracking devices to effectively generate much more accurate information regarding their activities as well as greater public security. Under provision of the bill, parole or probation would be revoked for failure to submit to a polygraph examination and would result in a class A misdemeanour for the first offender and a class D felony for subsequent failures. Therefore, NYC become adoptable to local laws which requires that sex offenders to pay an administrative fee in support of such programs.

Similarly, other federal court judges maintain more punitive and punishable approach to determine the length and condition of probation sentencing on individual basis. Based on a criminal law case in Houston, Texas, the State Distinct Judge Ted Poe gave 20 years probation sentence against 66 old music instructor who was accused for sexually harassing two students.

In the U.S. state of Georgia, anyone convicted of rape, aggravated child molestation, aggravated sodomy, or kidnapping of a minor under the age of 13 years old will receive a mandatory minimum sentence of 25 years up to a maximum to life without the possibility of parole, and will be subject to probation for life; following his or her release from prison.

=== United Kingdom ===
In the United Kingdom's jurisdiction, probation refers to an imprisonment liberalisation on licence or on parole via community services. During serving on probation, offenders must accomplish certain probational conditions including unpaid work, training course and education, addiction treatment for substances and alcohol and regularly meeting with a probation officer. During probation period, defendants must have meeting with the manager to discuss about how the community-based probation works, when and where the upcoming meeting will be held, as well as what possible outcomes of probation violations are. Offender manager will request to agree to a 'sentence plan' which describes the rules that offenders must obey under probation. In addition, if the offender violates the rules of probation, they could be resent to the court and likely to receive additional sentence or probation extension. Violation of probation typically includes committing another crime, failure to attend meeting and appointments without decent reasons, aggressive, racist or other morally unacceptable behaviour. Offenders may be resent to prison if they violated the condition of their licence or parole. This is also known as 'recall' and there are three distinctive 'recall' types.

==== Fix-term recalls ====
Offender will be sent back to prison for either fourteen days or twenty-eight days. Former case is only if the given sentence was less than 12 months, On the other hand, latter case is if the provided sentence was more than 12 months. When the offender is released, he/she will be require to accomplish probational service until the end of sentenced period.

==== Standard recalls ====
Offender will be sent back to prison until the end of the given sentence except the case a parole board or the Secretary of State for Justice decided to liberate the offender from imprisonment. The offender's case is going to deliver to the board after 28 days, and the board members will either set felony free from prison or decide a date when offender can be released on licence. The case can be review by offender manager at any time and the manager has an authority to suggest the Secretary of State regarding whether offender ought to be released.

==== Indeterminate sentence recalls ====
A parole board will receive the convicted felon's case either 28 days after resending the defendant back to the prison or within 12 months of last parole reviewing by the board. One of the actions on the offender will be taken by the parole board which include liberating the offender on licence immediately, setting a date when he/she will be freed on licence, keeping the offender in the prison, requesting offender to be present at hearing, or delaying giving the decision regarding the sentence until they obtain sufficient information or evidences.

=== Australia ===
New South Wales Parliament library research service states that probation is commonly used criminal sentence in NSW which the Probation and Parole Service (PPS) control offenders' activity and provide supervision for the combined purpose of assistance and rehabilitation. The Service's other significant function is to give advice to the courts regarding offenders' parole release. The traditional aim of probation was to 'advice, assist and befriend' offenders who need support rather than receiving punishment. In every Australian State and Territory, probation is not major components of its legislative framework and does not contain any statutory fundamentals within its administration.

Also, according to Queensland Government, probation refers to a community-based service which the court may apply upon defendants either as a substitution or followed by imprisonment sentence. Within the Queensland governmental condition, offenders will be required to obey the certain conditions of probation for a duration of half year to 3 years. Conditions may include: not committing other crimes, reporting to the Probation and Parole Service (PPS) office, joining to the treatment programs or counselling and obtaining grant permission to leave the state. The court may add extension of probation or additional conditions depending on individuals' needs.

In NSW, the court may sentence the offender on a bond or recognisance with a condition followed by supervision by PPS. A 'recognisance' or 'bond' is an undertaking by the defendant to maintain socially responsible behaviour for the certain duration which the court exclusively attaches to the bonds and recognisances. When the court provide a sentence to an adult offender, the judge may request a pre-sentence report which contains verified information regarding the defendant's circumstances, an assessment of the offender's behaviour as well as additional information relevant to sentencing in order to determine appropriate length of probation sentence.

During the probation period, offenders must report to a PPS officer on regular basis for the purpose of monitoring as well as rehabilitation process. If the defendant violated or could not satisfy certain conditions, the offender may be resent to the court to examine further sentences or extension of probation. Under such circumstance, the Magistrate or Judge of the court will determine whether the offender can maintain community-based supervision.

== Length of probation sentences ==
=== Elements determining duration of probation ===
When the felony is sentenced, the duration of individual probational serving is normally set by the court. Few aspects of the federal or state constitutions may restrict the length of probation period, although the sentence usually clearly obeys the local law to establish fairness and justice.

Statutory limitations perhaps determine time period of the proposed probation as well as the conditional circumstance which the probation can be extended. The duration of probation sentence can be lengthened for the probational violation or failing to satisfy certain conditions. However, some statues may incentivise probationers due to its galvanised facets of shortening the length of the original probation or terminating probation.

Another factor influencing the length of probation sentences is the seriousness of committed offence. Defendants who are more likely to receive longer sentence may have had more than two criminal charges, or prior criminal convictions. If the offender holds more than three convictions, the convicted felony will be more likely to receive prison sentence rather than serving as community-based probation.

=== Maximum probation terms ===
For more dangerous offenders, typically serious sex offenders, state count perhaps authorise a lifetime probation accordingly the state law. Sentencing lifetime terms of probation aside, the most common length of felony probation in the United States is five years, with laws in 8 of the 21 states examined setting this as the maximum term of probational service. On the other hand, in three states such as Indiana, Colorado and Florida the length of the maximum probation is unclear or discretionary. However, the average length of probation in California State is 4 years which is considerably close to the maximum probation term majority of states apply.

=== Probation extension ===
Probation extension will be given to convicted felony if the offender violated the certain condition of probation or unsuccessfully satisfied release conditions. The court exclusively maintains the authority to add further probation time to the offenders' sentence. Probation extension is normally up to the maximum possible term for the committed crime.

However, one third of the states still hold that probation could only be extended after the violation of probation. On the other hand, in many other states, the probational extension can occur upon failure to achieve certain condition, often relative to financial obligation. Essentially, two jurisdictions within the United States, Maine and Washington, still hold an approach to no probation extension.

== Categories of supervision ==
The United States federal courts define supervision as a core responsibility of U.S. probation and pretrial services officers, followed by investigation. Supervision is an approach to monitor offenders' activities and behaviour who federal courts or paroling authorised to release from the prison to the community. Supervision is also known as an alternative to jail or prison that costs less than incarcerations and offers felons the chance to coexist with their family members, participate to labour force as well as be productive members of society. Offenders on supervision must obey the release conditions which are established by the court. Release condition may include banning possessing guns or any other weapons, prohibiting reaching out to casualties or witnesses, restricting communicating with certain persons, limiting travel opportunities and charging a curfew. Many other major release conditions may be imposed by the court as follows.

=== Community service ===
Convicted felons will be required to work for a civic or NPO without wage payment. There are two distinguishable purposes the court may hold such as punishment and rehabilitation for offenders. For punishable reason, the court limit offenders' leisure time through community service as well as their liberty. Via community service, offenders will be required to maintain socially responsible behaviour. Offenders will also obtain working experience and certain job skills for the purpose of returning to the society. Furthermore, the community will benefit from non-cost labour power.

=== Employment ===
Employment is one of release conditions against convicted felonies to work at a lawful workplace. The court may use this condition upon offenders due to its less likelihood of committing further crime facet as well as gainful employment status. Under employment release condition, offenders will have access to gainful educational as well as vocational training. This also enables offenders to be financially stable for the payment of taxes and incurred fines.

=== Mental health treatment ===
Mental health treatment is certain condition for defendants to treat their psychological or psychiatric issues through counselling and medication. The court may apply this condition for the purpose of monitoring convicted offenders who have mental or psychological diseases or disorders. Also, the court may introduce this condition in order for supervision officers to assess and care for such defendants. Via the mental health treatment, convicted offenders with such mental issues will benefit from psychologically stabilising facet, and significant reduction in the risk of committing other crimes.

=== Substance abuse treatment ===
Substance abuse treatment is a condition for defendants to participate drug detoxification program and family or group counselling. The court may introduce this condition upon convicted offenders for the purpose of monitoring consumption of illegal drugs, medicines, or alcohol. This condition effectively enables probation officers to control drug and alcohol abuse as well as their behaviour. Through the supervision of substance abuse treatment, convicted offenders will behave abstinently and consequently diminish the potential risks of committing further crime.

== Main offenses ==
=== Sex offenses ===
==== Sexual abuse ====
In 2015, the Maricopa County Superior Court judge sentenced James R. Stough II for lifetime probation on his sex offense against a 16-year-old girl to whom he was providing an Uber ride. According to police investigation, Stough had been driving her home from school when she revealed that she had harmed her lower leg. Stough then maneuvered into an undeveloped neighborhood in north Scottsdale and told her that he was a medical caretaker and would examine her lower leg. Experts mentioned that Stough's DNA was located on the young lady's shorts.

The victim's father created an impression why Stough's sentence needed to be time in jail. He was at home when he heard his daughter shouting the day of the wrongdoing, moreover she was not capable of talking in her wailing state. Her father commented, “I need the court to comprehend the obliteration this creature has exacted on my family.”

On the other hand, Stough's life partner, Stephanie Edwards, depicted Stough as a decent man and diligent employee through expressing his greatness as a father as well as superior commitment to the group. Stough at last requested a sentence of 10 years unsupervised probation. However, the judge Erine Otis said that Stough must keep the term of his regulated probation.

==== Voyeurism ====
In 2018, Garrison Sloan, 44 years old of Fort Defiance, Arizona was sentenced to six years' imprisonment as well as lifetime probation along with sex offender condition and registration by U.S. District Judge Douglas L. Rayes. As a significant component to consider, Slough was previously convicted of ten counts of voyeurism. The prosecution was conducted by Assistant U.S. Attorney William G. Voit.

Federal Bureau of Investigation promptly investigated such crime and found that Sloan and an IT specialist at the Tsehootsooi Medical Center in Fort Defiance set several hidden cameras in bathrooms for the purpose of voyeurism against his coworkers. Furthermore, seizure of all Sloan's computer equipment revealed many victims who are members of the Navajo Nation and his crime occurred within the Navajo Nation Indian Reservation.

== See also ==
- United States federal probation and supervised release
- Probation (workplace)
- Parole
- Private probation
- Life imprisonment
- Life imprisonment in Australia
