= Napo (trade union) =

British trade union

- Napo
- Founded: 1912; 114 years ago
- Headquarters: 160 Falcon Road, London
- Location: United Kingdom
- Members: ▲6,345 (2024)
- General Secretary: Ian Lawrence
- Affiliations: TUC; GFTU; TUCG
- Website: napo.org.uk

Napo (formerly the National Association of Probation Officers) is the trade union and professional association that represents probation staff including probation officers and other operational and administrative staff and Children and Family Court Advisory and Support Service staff in England.

Napo was formed on 22 May 1912. It was a member of the Standing Conference of Organisations of Social Workers from 1962, but decided not to join the new British Association of Social Workers in 1970. In 2001, it opted to change its title to "Napo–the trade union and professional association for family court and probation staff". It holds an annual general meeting which is open to all members of the union.

It continues to focus on criminal justice and family court matters and is regarded as a source of information by media organizations and politicians across different political parties.

General Secretary Ian Lawrence was reappointed unopposed to commence a third 5 year term of office from July 2023. He is among the few senior British/Asian trade union leaders to emerge from the community for some time and currently serves on the TUC General Council as the member representing black workers from unions with less than 200,000 members.

Ian has made a substantial number of contributions in the media on the situation pertaining to the state of the probation service in England and Wales following the part privatisation of services in 2014. He has also contributed to a number of keynote seminars examining issues within the wider UK criminal justice system and has also provided oral evidence to the Parliamentary Justice Select Committee inquiry into the impact of the Transforming Rehabilitation programme. On 13 June 2020 Napo celebrated a major victory following the announcement by the Lord Chancellor that probation services would return to public ownership and control in June 2021. This news followed a long and sometimes attritional campaign which commanded widespread support from many politicians and groups who had also predicted major problems following the ill-fated reforms that were implemented by the then Secretary of State for Justice Chris Grayling.

Napo is an independent trade union but has good relations with the Labour Party front bench and a number of cross-party MP's and Peers in terms of assisting the development of its future policies on the probation and prison service and family justice issues. It is also a founding member of the Justice Unions Parliamentary Group.

The Probation Journal, established in 1929, is published by SAGE Publications in association with Napo.

== General Secretaries ==
1930: H. E. Norman
1943: E. M. Hughes (acting until 1946)
1948: Frank Dawtry
1967: David Haxby
c.1970: Donald Bell
c.1980: Bill Beaumont
1993: Judy McKnight
2008: Jonathan Ledger
2013 to present: Ian Lawrence

== Chairs of National NAPO ==
1912 — : Mr. Sydney George Edridge, O.B.E.
Approx. 1928 — 1940: Gertrude Mary Tuckwell, CH
1941 — 1946: Mr C E Garland
1946 — 1949: Mr Seldon Charles Forrester Farmer, OBE
1967: Nigel Grindrod
— 2014: Tom Rendon
— 2022: Katie Lomas
2022 — 2024: Helen Banner
2024: Ben Cockburn

== Vice-Chairs of National NAPO ==
1946 — : Mr W G Buchanan
— 2024: Ben Cockburn
2024 to present: Charron Culnane
