= Probation (disambiguation) =

Probation is the suspension of all or part of a jail sentence.

Probation may also refer to:

== Arts and media ==
- Probation (1932 film), an American Pre-Code film
- Probation (1960 film), a Soviet drama film
- "The Probation", an episode of Line of Duty
- Probation Journal, an academic journal

== Concepts relating to discipline ==
- Academic probation, the warning period allowed students to reverse serious academic or behavioral decline
- Disciplinary probation, a disciplinary status that can apply to students at a tertiary institution or to employees in the workplace
- Probation (workplace), a status given to new employees of a company or business
- Probation (NCAA), a possible sanction resulting from violating the rules of the National Collegiate Athletics Association

== See also ==
- Future probation, a concept in Christian soteriology
- Girls' Probationary School, a former school in Adelaide, Australia
- Probationary marriage, a form of temporary marriage practised in some cultures
