= PVG =

PVG may refer to:

- Hampton Roads Executive Airport, FAA LID code PVG
- Piano Vocals Music, a kind of book combining sheet music and a song book
- Protection of Vulnerable Groups Scheme
- Shanghai Pudong International Airport, IATA code PVG
