= Judicial Correction Services =

Private American probation company

- Type: Privately held company
- Founded: 2001
- Headquarters: Georgia
- Area served: United States
- Services: self-funding probation

Judicial Correction Services, Incorporated (Delaware) (JCS) is a privately held probation company established in 2001 and based in Georgia. The company acts as a self-funding probation agency for local courts, mostly in the southeast United States. The company is part of the private "extra-carceral" or "alternatives to incarceration" industry, which includes private halfway houses, probation services and/or electronic monitoring. This industry, which includes services such as Judicial Correctional Service is "offender-funded", shifting the cost of probation onto probationers. The industry includes private extra-carceral institutions such as halfway houses, probation services and electronic monitoring.

== History ==
JCS was established in 2001. By 2009 JCS employed about 300 people and reported revenues of more than thirteen million dollars.

In 2011 J.C.S was acquired by Correctional Healthcare Companies. In a July 2012 case regarding the contract between Judicial Correction Services and Harpersville, Alabama, Judge Hub Harrington accused JCS of egregious abuses which were akin to "debtors' prison" and an "extortion racket" condoned by the elected officials of Harpersville in their aggressive pursuit of fines owed the Harpersville Municipal Court.

Multiple Alabama municipalities ended their contracts with Judicial Correction Services in 2015, due to the multiple local and federal lawsuits facing the company's practices. As a result, the company announced in November 2015 it was closing all of its Alabama offices.

== Services ==
If a person is sentenced to parole for committing a misdemeanor such as the inability to pay traffic fines, J.C.S ensures the probationer meets all the conditions of parole and requires the probationer to pay various fees (in addition to fines) that provide a significant profit to the firm. Persons who are unwilling or unable to pay the fine and fees or who otherwise fail to meet the conditions of parole can be jailed.

Aggressive pursuit of these fines and fees can double collections in some areas.

== Controversies ==
A Birmingham, Alabama lawyer William M. Dawson filed a lawsuit against Judicial Correction Services and Harpersville Municipal Court.

In July 2012, Judge Hub Harrington of Shelby County, Alabama halted the company’s aggressive pursuit of fines owed the Harpersville Municipal Court. He stated,

From a fair reading of the defendant’s testimony, one might ascertain that more apt description of the Harpersville Municipal Court is that of a judicially sanctioned extortion racket.

Judge Harrington found that Harpersville Municipal Court's actions "repeatedly violated the constitutional rights of defendants" who were trapped by JCS into paying several times the amount of their original no-leniency court-imposed fines and fees. In his findings Judge Harrington described how under the contract between Judicial Correction Services and Harpersville a defendant who is unable to immediately pay in full a fine of $200 on the day of trial is placed on probation. JCS probation office charges the defendant a monthly fee which is so high that it would take 14 months to pay it off at a total cost of $200. Sometimes the JCS monthly fees would be even higher, requiring an "additional 40 months of payments totaling $2,100."

However, Bernard Harwood, a former associate justice of the Alabama Supreme Court, who was hired by JCS to review its practices, "found that the company was merely doing the job it had been hired to do, and that any jailing for debt was not the fault of JCS, because private probation companies do not have the legal authority to send people to jail or to determine indigence.".

In a 23 June 2014 in-depth article in The New Yorker journalist Sarah Stillman investigated whether lucrative profits from injustice were being made by the private "alternatives to incarceration" industry. Her article focused on J.C.S.

On March 11, 2015, the Southern Poverty Law Center filed suit accusing the firm of violating federal racketeering laws by extorting money from impoverished Alabamians by threatening them with jail when they fall behind on paying fines from traffic violations or other citation. As part of the settlement agreement, the city of Clanton dropped its contract with Judicial Correction Services. As a result, cities across Alabama have begun to drop contracts with Judicial Correction Services.

The March 22, 2015 episode of Last Week Tonight with John Oliver contained a segment on municipal violations. Part of the segment included details on the questionable operating methods of the firm and how their actions, in several cases, have only served to increase the debt of those who need to pay fines due to municipal violations.
