= Disclosure Scotland =

Criminal record disclosure service in Scotland

Executive agency overview
- Jurisdiction: Scotland
- Executive agency executive: Gerard Hart, Chief Executive
- Parent Executive agency: Scottish Government
- Website: www.mygov.scot/organisations/disclosure-scotland/

Disclosure Scotland (Scottish Gaelic: Foillseachadh na h-Alba) is an executive agency of the Scottish Government, providing criminal records disclosure services for employers and voluntary sector organisations.

Disclosure Scotland currently offers a range of products, starting with Basic Disclosures but continuing on to Standard and Enhanced checks (so called 'police act disclosures') and the PVG Scheme, operated under the Protection of Vulnerable Groups (Scotland) Act 2007. New legislation, passed in 2020, will significantly reform state disclosure in Scotland.

Any person can apply for a Basic Disclosure in their own name: this is a document listing the person's unspent convictions under the terms of the Rehabilitation of Offenders Act 1974.

Standard and Enhanced checks are retained at present but are now used relatively infrequently, mainly for legal and security industry checks as well as for necessarily one off checks such as those for new adoptive parents. These higher level checks do allow for spent convictions to be disclosed, but these (and those disclosed under the PVG Scheme) are subject to filtration by rules introduced in a 2015 Remedial Order (a convention compliance order using the urgent procedure) that ensured Scotland's disclosure regime complied with the European Convention on Human Rights.

The Protection of Vulnerable Groups Scheme, or PVG Scheme is administered by Disclosure Scotland. This scheme provides higher level criminal record information to organisations working with children and vulnerable adults. A signature characteristic is the fact that those joining the PVG Scheme are subject to ongoing monitoring of their criminal record and, should new information arise, the state may consider that person for barring.

Disclosure Scotland also operates the national barring service in Scotland, investigating those with a known history of harm in respect of barring from regulated work with children, protected adults or both groups. A reciprocal arrangement is in place so that those barred by Disclosure Scotland are also barred in England and Wales, and those barred by the Disclosure and Barring Service, the counterpoint organisation for England and Wales, are also barred in Scotland.

As part of the Scottish Government, Disclosure Scotland's staff are civil servants. Rather unusually for a delivery body, the organisation has a full Scottish Government policy team in-house, responsible for managing the recent Disclosure (Scotland) Act 2020 on its parliamentary journey. That Act will revolutionise Disclosure in Scotland, increasing citizen freedoms and especially the ability to move on from a past criminal history but also simultaneously tightening the protection of vulnerable people from harm.

Examples of the former include new protections for those convicted between ages 12–17 from state disclosure except in the most severe cases, new rights to appeal convictions that would otherwise have been automatically disclosed, new powers to contest information that police may disclose on level 2 (including PVG) disclosures and a new Independent Reviewer empowered to make final decisions when citizens and the state are in dispute about what ought to be disclosed.

Examples of the latter are a new mandatory PVG Scheme for those in regulated roles, a new focus on disclosure for those holding power over the vulnerable and new powers for the state to impose safeguarding conditions on those being investigated for barring.
