= Protection of Vulnerable Groups Scheme =

Service offered by Disclosure Scotland

The Protection of Vulnerable Groups Scheme (PVGS) is a service offered by Disclosure Scotland to enable organisations in the public, private and voluntary sectors to make more informed decisions when recruiting for regulated work involving vulnerable people. It achieves this by analysing individuals' criminal records.

It is similar to the Disclosure and Barring Service in England and Wales.

== Process ==
There are four different types of disclosure record available under the PVGS:

- Scheme record (for new joiners to the scheme)
- Existing scheme record (for those already with the scheme who want to work with a different vulnerable group)
- Scheme record group (for those already with the scheme who are joining a new organisation but working with the same vulnerable group)
- Scheme membership statement (for those employing others to partake in regular work, or self employed individuals partaking in regulated work)

A PVGS member's certificate only shows information available on the date of the check, however the scheme continuously monitors individuals, receiving updates through Disclosure Scotland whenever a scheme member is convicted of an offence.

It is, however, advised that organisations should seek updates on their staff's PVGS membership status every three years.

== History ==
The PVGS was introduced in response to the Bichard report which was undertaken after the Soham murders in 2002. As recommended by the report the scheme involves continuous updating into its checks. It came into full force in February 2011.
