= Probation Journal =

- Discipline: Criminology
- Language: English
- Edited by: Jake Phillips

Publication details
- History: 1929-present
- Publisher: SAGE Publications on behalf of the National Association of Probation Officers (England)
- Frequency: Quarterly

Standard abbreviations
- ISO 4: Probat. J.

Indexing
- ISSN: 0264-5505 (print); 1741-3079 (web)
- LCCN: 2003214495
- OCLC no.: 479029178

Links
- Journal homepage; Online access; Online archive

The Probation Journal: The Journal of Community and Criminal Justice is a peer-reviewed academic journal covering criminal justice and probation that was established in 1929. It is published by SAGE Publications in association with the National Association of Probation Officers (England).

== Current and former editors ==
Name	Period of tenure
Jake Phillips	2025 - present
Nicola Carr	2016 - 2024
Lol Burke	2007 - 2016
Hindpal Singh Bhui	1997 - 2007
Nigel Stone	1982 - 1997

== Abstracting and indexing ==
The Probation Journal is abstracted and indexed in the following databases:

- Academic Premier
- Current Contents/Social and Behavioral Sciences
- Educational Research Abstracts Online
- Scopus
- Social Sciences Citation Index
- Studies on Women & Gender Abstracts
