= Probation and parole officer =

Officials who supervise the conduct of offenders on community supervision

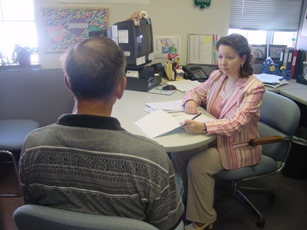
- A probation and parole officer of the Missouri Department of Corrections interviews a probationer

Occupation
- Names: Probation and parole officer Probation and parole agent Community corrections officer Correctional treatment specialist
- Occupation type: Employment
- Activity sectors: Law enforcement, corrections, public safety, public service, social work

Description
- Competencies: Secondary or tertiary education
- Fields of employment: Public areas, correctional facilities
- Related jobs: Police officer correctional officer social worker

A probation or parole officer is an official appointed or sworn to investigate, report on, and supervise the conduct of convicted offenders on probation or those released from incarceration to community supervision such as parole. Most probation and parole officers are employed by the government of the jurisdiction in which they operate, although some are employed by private companies that provide contracted services to the government.

== Duties and functions ==
Responsibilities of a probation or parole officer are varied. While the majority of the public considers these officers as merely supervisors of offenders, their role within the legal system is significantly broader and more complex. While their roles vary throughout the world, they are commonly responsible for upholding conditions of supervision as sentenced by a court or other government entity which includes specific case management aimed at reducing an offender's risk to reoffend.

At a minimum, they are required to possess above average oral and written communication skills and have a broad knowledge of the criminal justice system. This includes knowledge of the roles, relationships, and responsibilities that are distributed among the government agencies and outside organizations such as the courts, the parole authority, the prison system, local jails, prosecuting attorneys, other law enforcement and corrections agencies, treatment providers, etc. Officers must understand applicable case law and sentencing guidelines. Additionally, they must have an ability to work with an extremely diverse population of individuals who have been convicted of various crimes. They must also accept the potential hazards of working closely with a criminal population. In the United States, most jurisdictions require officers to have a four-year bachelor's degree, and prefer a graduate degree for federal probation officer positions.

Officers are usually issued a badge or some other form of credentials indicating their position and sometimes rank. In some cases, they may carry a pistol openly or concealed, and often carry less-than-lethal devices such as pepper spray or tasers for self-protection. Typically, probation and parole officers do not wear standard law enforcement uniforms, but dress in plainclothes, business or casual attire.

The structure of probation and parole agencies varies. Traditionally, these agencies have a loosely based paramilitary command structure, and are usually headed by a chief, field supervisor, or director. In some U.S. states, probation departments fall under a county sheriff, and officers may be uniformed and integrated into the structure of the agency. In both systems, some parole and probation officers supervise general caseloads with offenders who are convicted of a variety of offenses. Others may hold specialized caseload positions, and work with specific groups of offenders such as sex offenders, gang members, offenders sentenced to electronic monitoring (such as house arrest) or GPS monitoring, and cases with severe mental health, substance abuse and/or violent histories.

== Training ==
Probation and parole officer training will vary depending on the legislated power given or the socioeconomics of the region. In some jurisdictions, they may be certified law enforcement officials who have completed mandated police academy training. Other may act as court officials with a more social work oriented or bureaucratic role.

In North America, standard training usually includes:

- Use of force and restraints (i.e., handcuffs, leg-irons, belly-chains)
- Weapons (firearms, taser, pepper spray, etc.)
- Self-defense and subject control
- First aid and CPR
- Report writing
- Courtroom testimony
- Defusing hostility
- Interpersonal communication
- Correction law
- Criminal and criminal procedural law
- Case work and criminal investigations
- Gang intelligence

Many jurisdictions have also, in recent years, expanded basic training to include:

- Suicide prevention/crisis intervention
- Critical incident stress management
- Occupational Safety and Health Act (U.S.) or Workplace Hazardous Materials Information System (Canada)
- Gang awareness and intervention
- Crisis negotiation
- Drug abuse training
- Rehabilitation programs
- Rapid response training
- Prison Rape Elimination Act (PREA)

== By country ==
=== Australia ===
Probation and parole officers in Australia serve an active role in recommending community based supervision to magistrates and judges. They also make recommendations to parole boards to determine whether a prisoner should be granted parole. Probation officers are expected to not only supervise an offender while he or she performs community service, but to also develop the community service plans themselves.

=== Canada ===
Parole officers in Canada play a critical role at both the institutional and community levels. Their primary function is to assess risk and manage the intervention process with offenders throughout their sentence. They are the first line of defense when administering the Correctional Service of Canada's obligations towards public safety. Once the offender has entered the federal correctional system, parole officers assess the needs of offenders, such as their programming needs, and the security risks they pose. Subsequently, offenders are matched with selected institutional services such as rehabilitation programs. This includes identifying the factors contributing to criminal behavior, developing intervention plans to address them, and helping offenders to undertake and complete those intervention plans. At the institutional level, parole officers make recommendations concerning offender transfers, temporary absences, and other forms of conditional release, including parole release as part of reintegrating offenders into society. Parole officers work as part of a team which includes the offender, correctional officer, community parole officer, psychologist, and programs officer. In the community, parole officers ensure public safety by making scheduled or unscheduled visits with offenders, and communicating with family, police, employers as well as other persons who may be assisting the offender. Other duties include writing progress reports and working with many community agencies to help secure stable housing, employment and income.

=== Malta ===
Malta has its own probation services that form part of the Department of Correctional Services within the Ministry of Justice & Home Affairs. The probation services have been in existence since 1957 and the first probation order was granted in 1961. There is no parole as of yet in Malta, however a bill introducing parole has been presented in parliament. The Maltese Probation Services gives services both at the pre-sentencing and post sentencing stages in accordance to the Probation Act (Chap. 446, Laws of Malta). Services include probation orders, suspended sentence supervision orders, community service orders, combination orders, provisional orders of supervision, pre-sentencing reports, and social inquiry reports.

=== United Kingdom ===
In the United Kingdom, probation orders were introduced by the Probation of Offenders Act 1907, and the practice of placing offenders on probation was already routinely undertaken in the London police courts by voluntary organizations such as the London Police Court Mission later known as the Rainer Foundation. These earlier probation services provided the inspiration for similar ideas in the humane treatment and supervision of offenders throughout the British Empire and also in former colonies of Britain as missionaries and members of the British criminal justice system travelled the globe.

In modern times the duties of probation officers in the U.K. are to supervise offenders released on licence from custody, and to supervise offenders given non-custodial supervisory sentences at court. The work involves focuses on the management of risk of serious harm associated with offenders, on sentence planning and the selection and delivery of a range of interventions aimed at reducing reoffending, and on supervising; and variously devising, delivering or subcontracting schemes by which offenders having "community payback" sentences can discharge their requirement to perform unpaid work. Probation officers are also charged with providing a variety of reports on offenders throughout their criminal justice lifecycle, such as pre-sentence reports making recommendations on interventions likely to reduce the likelihood of reoffending or of causing serious harm; pre-release reports making recommendations on licence conditions or other interventions necessary for offenders being considered for release on licence; and parole reports advising the parole board of the probation service view of the offender suitability for release. Such reports typically provide assessments of the criminal, the nature of crimes and effect on victims, the criminogenic needs and risk of serious harm associated with the individual, and will normally be based in part on an offender assessment system analysis. Probation officers are also responsible for the provision of regular reports to courts of the progress of offenders on orders having drug testing requirements. Additionally, probation officers will supervise a restorative justice plan that provides the victim of a crime an opportunity to address the impact of the crime to the offenders.

Probation officers are responsible for recalling offenders who have been released on licence and have breached their license conditions, and to return offenders on community payback orders to court for re-sentencing in the event of breaches of the terms of the order. The English and Welsh system has two levels of officer, probation officer, and probation service officer - the latter will normally have less training than the former, and will be limited to supervising offenders at low and medium risk of serious harm.

=== Thailand ===
Probation in Thailand is currently under the auspices of the Thailand Ministry of Justice. It has been developed through various amendment and enactment of laws and regulation along with the advancement of knowledge within criminal justice and criminology sphere. The probation system was first introduced into Thailand in 1952 and applied to juvenile detention centres under the juvenile and family court. In 1956, the use of probation was explicitly stipulated for the first time in the modern Criminal Code of Thailand as a condition of sentence or punishment in adult criminal cases. Probation was never formally invoked, however, until the Proceedings of Probation Act 1979 was enacted which was nearly twenty years later with the establishment of the first probation office, the Central Probation Office, was also established correspondingly as a division within the Office of Judicial Affairs under the Criminal Court, Ministry of Justice. In 1992, the Central Probation Office was elevated to be part of the Department of Probation separated from the court with the main roles and responsibilities in adult probationers under suspension of sentence or punishment. Responsibility for juvenile probation was then transferred to the Department of Juvenile Observation and Protection and probation for parolees was transferred to the Department of Corrections under the Ministry of Interior. The fragmentation of responsibilities led to the revision of agencies roles and responsibilities in 2001 when the cabinet had issued a resolution to re-organise probation works and the Department of Probation was proposed to be the main agency in charge of pretrial, trial and post-trial probation only for adult offenders, the aftercare services and drug rehabilitation for offenders to the department. In 2016, further the promulgation of the Probation Act 2016 significantly ameliorates and consolidates roles and responsibilities of the department and probation officers whilst offering better mechanism in order to support the essence of the implementation of non-custodial measure and rehabilitation of offenders. The work of drug addict rehabilitation is currently in the transition to the Ministry of Public Health.

=== United States ===
In the United States, probation and parole officers exist at the city, county, state, and federal levels, that is, wherever there is a court of competent jurisdiction. In 2020, over four million Americans were on probation or parole. Most probation and parole officers in the U.S. are required to possess a college degree, a valid driver's license, and must pass a series of background checks and psychological exams.

Most often, probation and parole officers will meet with offenders on their caseload either in an office setting or at the offender's residence or place of employment. These appointments usually consist of ensuring conditions of supervision are being upheld by gathering information related to the offender's whereabouts and activities. This may also include drug testing, specific case planning in the form of referrals to treatment programs based on court conditions or identified programming needs, and assisting offenders in overcoming barriers such as unemployment, homelessness, mental and physical health, etc. Officers will also collect the payments made by offenders toward any owed restitution, court obligations, and in some cases supervision obligations they may owe. Depending on specific departmental policy and procedure, it is common for each individual offender to be evaluated and classified according to their risk to the community and their need for community correctional services. Higher-risk offenders are provided the greatest level of supervision and scrutiny. Most often, each jurisdiction has a specific and standard set of supervision rules that offenders must follow. Rules may include such things as obtaining permission before leaving the state of conviction, reporting residence and employment changes, avoiding contact with specific persons, zero tolerance for alcohol or illegal drug consumption, etc. In some instances, officers are permitted to conduct random offender residence inspections to search for contraband such as weapons and illegal drugs. Specialized officers such as those who supervise sexual offenders may be tasked with enforcing specialty rules that restrict, for example, a sexual offender's ability to access the internet or possess certain items.

When offenders violate the terms of their supervision, it is the duty of the officer to respond within the scope of departmental policy and procedure. If the violations are severe enough, officers are tasked with revoking the supervision of an offender. For probationers, this commonly means the offender will return to the sentencing court to be sentenced based on the original conviction while taking into account their behavior on supervision. In some instances, a revoked offender may be sentenced directly to jail or prison depending on the type of sentence and legislation. Officers will commonly provide written reports or court testimony for the court to consider at sentencing. For those on parole or if they are finishing their prison sentence in the community, revocation of this form of supervision means that they will return to prison. Officers will also provide recommendations as to the length of time that a revoked offender will return to incarceration.

==== Federal ====
The U.S. Probation and Pretrial Services System employs probation officers on the federal level who supervise offenders on federal probation. Parole was abolished from the Federal Bureau of Prisons in 1984, and as such there are no longer any federal parole officers. However, there are a small and decreasing number of parolees still being supervised that were sentenced prior to 1984, including court-martialed US military personnel. U.S. probation officers supervise these cases. These officers are sworn federal law enforcement officers working under the jurisdiction of the U.S Federal Courts. They undergo intensive training at the Federal Probation and Pretrial Services Training Academy, located at the Federal Law Enforcement Training Center in Charleston, South Carolina. Generally, U.S. probation officers investigate an offender's personal and criminal history for the court prior to sentencing and then may supervise defendants who have been sentenced to probation but not to a term of incarceration (unless the conditions of probation are violated). They may also serve arrest warrants, and can perform any other function assigned by the federal court. To date, four U.S. probation officers have died in the line of duty.

==== State ====
Most U.S. states employ parole officers via their department of corrections to supervise offenders that have served a prison term and have subsequently been paroled, or released from prison under supervision. This decision is commonly made after the review and consideration of an inmate's case by a warden, parole board or other parole authority. Parolees serve the remainder of their prison sentence in the community, which in some cases, is for life. However, some jurisdictions have modified or abolished the practice of parole and instead give post-release supervision obligations to a community corrections or offender rehabilitation specialist; often generically if imprecisely referred to as a probation or parole officer. Violations of parole are investigated by parole officers, and responses to violations vary by state and jurisdiction. For the most extreme violations, parole officers will revoke an individual's parole and return the offender to prison.

Other jurisdictions have expanded the parole officer's duties to include post-incarceration supervision under special sentencing, such as convictions requiring sex offender registration. They may also supervise, with specialized conditions, individuals convicted of DUI, drug offenses, and domestic violence. In 2011, almost 1.1 million people were on parole in the United States. This was up from 2001, when almost 731,000 individuals were under parole supervision. Since 1980, the fastest growing population of offenders in the judicial system has been probationers, while prison populations have also continued to grow, with U.S. prisons now housing more than 1.6 million inmates.

In some states, probation and parole officer duties are intertwined and officer's will supervise not only individuals serving community sentences after prison, but also individuals on probation as an alternative to incarceration.

==== County ====
Some jurisdictions operate probation services on a county level and officers are commonly employed by district, municipal, circuit courts, or by a sheriff's department. This includes both adult and juvenile probation services. These is commonly referred to as "pre-trial services". Some jurisdictions may also employ private companies under contract to supervise certain offenders in order to alleviate heavy workloads of government probation agencies. Private probation is a controversial subject and organizations such as the ACLU argue that private probation companies are profiting from poverty and devastating communities to a much greater extent than publicly run probation.

==== City ====
Less strict forms of supervision exist at city levels such as the "suspended imposition of sentence" (SIS), in which offenders are placed on probation but a judge does not impose a sentence and there is no conviction if successfully completed. Officers are responsible for overseeing and enforcing the conditions of these programs.

== Juvenile probation ==
Specialized officers are also tasked with the oversight of juvenile offenders. These officers, just as those who supervise adults, work to uphold court conditions imposed on delinquent, adjudicated youth and to reduce their risk for future offenses and may also monitor youths on GPS monitoring. Many juvenile probation agencies prefer to employ officers who have prior experience in counseling along with possessing graduate degrees. They often work closely with child protective services as well as both public and private educational systems, and service providers.

== In popular culture ==
"The public has little knowledge of parole, and seemingly even less interest. As a result, Hollywood hasn't rendered its existence with any sort of realism, so you end up with examples like Double Jeopardy, which is so wildly off base, and Ocean's Eleven, pretending it doesn't exist."

— Idaho probation and parole officer in a 2015 interview with Zachary Evans of Pursuit Magazine

Popular culture has depicted the role of probation and parole officers in a variety of ways. References to POs also occur in urban music such as rap and hip hop.

- Probation Officer 1959–1962 series made by ATV for British television. After a few weeks Seldon Farmer, Principal Probation Officer for Inner London Probation Service provided professional guidance and input following initial concerns about some scripts.
- Double Jeopardy, is a 1999 drama film that depicts a parole officer named Travis Lehman, played by Tommy Lee Jones, tracking down a woman he is supervising who has fled to find the man who framed her for murder.
- The Parole Officer, is a 2001 comedy film depicting a well-meaning but ineffectual parole officer played by Steve Coogan.
- Sexual Predator, is a 2001 film that depicts a female parole officer, played by Angie Everhart, who unwittingly becomes involved with a photographer who might be a serial killer.
- Stone, is a 2010 crime film depicting Robert De Niro as Jack Mabry, a parole officer nearing retirement who supervises a parolee called "Stone", played by Edward Norton.
- Our Idiot Brother, is a 2011 comedy film that depicts a parole officer Omar Coleman, played by Sterling K. Brown, supervising parolee Ned Rochlin, played by Paul Rudd.
- Two Men in Town, is a 2014 drama film that depicts parole officer Emily Smith, played by Brenda Blethyn, supervising high-profile parolee William Garnett, played by Forest Whitaker
- In the third season of the acclaimed black comedy crime anthology series Fargo, which premiered in 2017, one of the main characters, Raymond "Ray" Stussy, played by Ewan McGregor, is a parole officer, engaged to a recent parolee under his tutelage, Nikki Swango, played by Mary Elizabeth Winstead.
- Shot Caller, is a 2017 crime drama film that depicts a high level Aryan Brotherhood member on parole, played by Nikolaj Coster-Waldau, and his parole officer, played by Omari Hardwick, working to investigate the gang member's crimes.
- The Upside, is a 2017 comedy-drama film that depicts a parolee played by Kevin Hart who must obtain verification of job searches for his parole officer and ends up working as a private nurse for a wealthy quadriplegic man played by Bryan Cranston.
- O.G., is a 2018 film that depicts the reentry of an inmate and showcases his initial meetings with his parole officer played by Boyd Holbrook.
- Shameless (2011–2021), is an American television series that has multiple depictions of main characters such as Fiona Gallagher interacting with POs.
- Officer Black Belt, is a 2024 action comedy film, one of the main characters, Kim Sun-min, played by Kim Sung-kyun, is a probation officer who manages parolee wearing electronic ankle bracelets.
