= Private probation =

Private probation is the contracting of probation, including rehabilitative services and supervision, to private agencies. These include non-profit organizations and for-profit programs. The Salvation Army's misdemeanor probation services initiated in 1975, condoned by the state of Florida, is considered to be among the first private probation services. The private probation industry grew in 1992, when "local and county courts began outsourcing misdemeanor probation cases to private companies to alleviate pressure on overburdened state probation officers."

Opponents such as the ACLU argue that private probation companies are profiting from poverty and devastating communities to a much greater extent than publicly run probation. In The New York Times, Thomas B. Edsall notes that "The more commercialized fee collection and probation services get, the more the costs of these services are inflicted on the poor." Numerous jurisdictions have privatized probation for those convicted of misdemeanors who cannot pay court fines and fees, and the probation companies add daily supervision fees and threaten jail if offenders can't keep up payments.

== History ==
In 1841, John Augustus, a Boston cobbler, convinced a judge to grant him custody of a man convicted of public intoxication. The man would have been incarcerated, otherwise. The judge agreed, and instead, Augustus paid the man's fine and took him in. Augustus returned with the drunkard three weeks later for an evaluation. The judge perceived the man to be sober and respectable, and Augustus had found him a job. Impressed, the judge allowed Augustus to continue taking offenders into his custody for a probationary period as an alternative to imprisonment. Augustus took in over a thousand offenders, the majority of whom never returned to the criminal justice system. Augustus's method became popular, and was therefore implemented by Massachusetts as a public alternative to incarceration, and later by the other states in the United States. This slowly replaced private, voluntary probation such as that practiced by Augustus.

Faced with an increase in the number of offenders in the 1970s, the state of Florida became the first to begin private probation. In 1975 Florida authorized the Salvation Army Misdemeanor Probation program. In 1989 both Missouri and Tennessee passed laws allowing private entities to supervise misdemeanor offenders. In 1991 a new law in Georgia with similar content became the catalyst for the founding of private probation firms based in that state, such as Professional Probation Services, Inc. (founded in 1992) a subsidiary of Universal Health Services Inc., Sentinel Offender Services (founded in 1993), and Judicial Correction Services (established in 2001).

== United States ==
About ten states now contract probation to private companies. Private probation can take the form of a for-profit private probation agency, or a non-profit community-based private treatment provider. Private probation agencies usually model their practices after the bail bond system. Probationers would post a bond as insurance for their good behavior. Meeting probation conditions, such as attending court on a certain date, means that the probationer regains the bond. Failure to meet probation conditions means the probationer loses the bond. Most private probation agencies tend to specialize in certain kinds of offenses in an attempt to reduce their overall caseload.

Private probation dates to 1992 in the United States when there was a rapid increase in incarceration. The United States currently incarcerates over two million people, more than any other country in the world, both in absolute numbers and in proportion to its population. Overcrowded prisons have turned to community corrections to relieve their institutions—over five million people are currently serving probation or parole in the United States. However, recidivism rates are high, and overworked probation officers have difficulty monitoring and managing so many probationers, many of whom were sentenced to community corrections simply due to overcrowding.

As a result, since 1992 probation has also implemented privatization in order to relieve its caseload. In the United States private probation firms that provide offender-funded misdemeanor probation include Professional Probation Services, Inc. (founded in 1992) a subsidiary of Universal Health Services Inc., Sentinel Offender Services (founded in 1993), Judicial Correction Services (established in 2001), Southeast Corrections (founded in 2005), AD Probation, JAG Probation, Georgia Probation Services (founded in 1993 in Trenton, Georgia) and CSRA Probation with services offered in Georgia, Tennessee, Alabama, Mississippi, Florida, Colorado, Utah, Washington, Missouri, Michigan, Montana and Idaho.

=== Alabama ===
Judicial Correction Services provides probation services to court systems in Alabama. In 2012 Circuit Court Judge Hub Harrington in a well-documented case regarding private probation characterized the contract between Judicial Correction Services, a private probation company and the Harpersville Municipal Court as an extortion racket which created a debtors' prison condoned by local elected officials.

In 2013 a bill in Alabama to extend private probation from local municipal courts to state courts was supported by the private probation industry.

=== Georgia ===
Georgia uses private probation more than any other state, with approximately 500,000 citizens on probation last year. The situation there has been likened to "debtor's prison". Human Rights Watch estimated that private probation firms in Georgia collect approximately $40 million a year from the people they supervise, mostly those who cannot afford to pay fines associated with low-level misdemeanors such as stop sign violations, illegal lane change, or trespassing.

In 1991 a new law in Georgia authorized formal contracts under the Probation Services Agreement between local governing authorities and private organizations to supervise misdemeanor offenders. Georgia Legislature county-run probation services for misdemeanor cases were suspended and replaced with out-sourced private firms since c.1992. This was the catalyst for the founding of Georgia-based private probation firms such as Professional Probation Services, Inc. (founded in 1992) a subsidiary of Universal Health Services Inc., Sentinel Offender Services (founded in 1993), and Judicial Correction Services (established in 2001). Since 1996 the number of private probation contracts in Georgia had dramatically increased. By 2012 Georgia, with many rural areas, was one of only approximately 10-12 states that had private probation policies and services.

The Georgia bill, called House Bill (HB) 837 would have extended more probation services to private companies to manage the probation periods of minor offenders while exempting the companies from Georgia's open-records laws. Georgia Governor Nathan Deal vetoed Bill 837 in May 2014.

Sentinel Offender Services provides probation service to over ninety courts in Georgia. The private probation firm Sentinel Offender Services and the Richmond County State Court were accused of abuse and civil rights violations. "In Augusta, Georgia numerous former probationers accuse Sentinel Offender Services of ignoring their inability to pay hundreds and even thousands of dollars in company fees." Sentinel Offender Services no longer operates in the state of Georgia; however, the company, contracts and employees were bought by CSRA, who is also headquartered in Augusta.

On November 24, 2014, the Georgia Supreme Court ruled that Sentinel had violated Georgians' rights by charging them "tolls," a term for service fees charged by the probation company on top of government fines, which can extend beyond the duration of the actual probation. Georgians may now be able to get money they paid in "tolls" back from Sentinel and other probation companies in the state.

==== Georgia's regulatory system ====
According to the Human Rights Watch 2014 report, Georgia 's courts "put more people on probation with private companies than any other state" but Georgia also has a "more advanced regulatory and oversight model than any other state that permits privatized probation services." The Administrative Office of the Courts in Georgia in 2001, considered the "oversight mechanism and use of local judicial control in Georgia" as a potential "national model for misdemeanor probation privatization." However, as early as 2001 there were criticisms of private probation prompting a call for more "Advisory Council oversight and local accountability through careful contract crafting and performance supervision by the courts will be needed to insure the future success of private probation."

In their 2012 report to the Georgia Criminal Justice Reform Council, the Southern Center for Human Rights (SCHR) noted the conviction of former Chairman of the Georgia Board of Pardons and Paroles Bobby Whitworth, who during the 2000 General Assembly session in Georgia accepted a $75,000 bribe from Detention Management Services, Inc. for influencing the passing of Senate Bill 474. This private probation legislation, would have "effectively transferred supervision of approximately 25,000 misdemeanants from the State Department of Corrections to the individual counties." Private probation firms like DMS would have benefited greatly from potential individual county contracts. When Sentinel acquired Detention Management Services, Inc., their books showed the $75,000 as a lobbyist payment for passage of the legislation. The bill was withdrawn.

=== Florida ===
Judicial Correction Services provides probation services to court systems in Florida. Salvation Army does as well.

=== Mississippi ===
Judicial Correction Services provides probation services to court systems in Mississippi.

=== Michigan ===
Sentinel Offender Services is active in several Michigan counties. In September 2014, the ACLU brought suit against Michigan for imprisoning a woman who had fled to an emergency room after her boyfriend threatened her with a gun. Because she had been cited for driving without a license and had outstanding fines, she was arrested and sentenced to six months in prison.

== United Kingdom ==
In 2006 the UK Home Secretary John Reid announced that UK Probation Service would be opened to the private probation industry. Union representative Harry Fletcher argued that the data proves that the Probation Service was working well. In 2013 the United Kingdom announced plans to shift probation service contracts worth PS450 million from the regional probation trusts to the private probation industry (companies such as the large construction company Carillion plc). More than 200,000 offenders each year would be supervised by private probation companies. Coventry MP Jim Cunningham argued that the public probation system is "a social service dealing with human needs and human problems, whereas a private company runs on profit and sometimes they tend to take shortcuts to make that profit." The National Association of Probation Officers calls the subcontracting "a disgrace." In May 2014 Bob Jones, police and crime commissioner for the West Midlands, called the controversial scheme to use the private probation industry as "reckless." Jones argued that "changes could lead to higher crime because they would mean the end of a successful scheme which was keeping crime down, called integrated offender management."

== Criticism ==
=== Lack of oversight ===
The American Probation and Parole Association (APPA) began endorsing private sector services "to enhance or supplement supervision and casework services" in 1987. Although states are increasingly privatizing community corrections, some critics argue that private probation is less subject to the standards of oversight and regulation that public probation is held to. Private probation agencies generally require less certification, license, education, training, and employment recommendations than required of probation officers in the employ of the state. Moreover, while a heavy caseload is burdensome to the state, for a private agency, heavy caseloads can be profitable and are often planned for, even if services for individual clients deteriorate. States rarely employ minimum standards for private probation agencies. As such, agencies have less incentive to report violations, and there is usually less oversight requiring them to do so.

== Probation for profit ==
Since the 1970s in Texas there have been a number of offender-funded initiatives designed to increase county probation services by making probationers pay for a large part of their own supervision. According to a National Institute of Justice 1992 paper,

Probation administrators in Texas have implemented a number of innovations to increase revenue: linking fee collections to staff performance, giving judicial priority to fee collections, instituting a strong no-waiver policy, and strictly enforcing payment. To collect a higher proportion of fees, in the 1980's the Texas Legislature introduced additional measures such as automatic assessments, computerized tracking, and increased State contributions. These authors note several benefits of fee collection: saving time through automation, providing another avenue for casework, and expanding probation services into other areas.

=== Offender-funded private probation model ===
Since the 1970s, the Texas State Legislature has enacted a number of initiatives designed to help county probation departments increase their total revenues by requiring probationers to pay for a substantial proportion of their own supervision costs.

Sentinel Offender Services claims to have pioneered the offender-funded model of private probation services in 1992 and to have saved the tax payer "hundreds upon hundreds of millions of dollars." In an environment where municipal courts across the United States are under considerable financial strain, private probation companies such as Judicial Correction Services, who are "offender-funded" are able to provide the service for free to local authorities while turning a substantial profit.

A distinction is made between the "offender-funded" private probation model or "probation for profit" and private probation which is not in itself problematic. Problems arise when "public officials allow probation companies to profit by extracting fees directly from probationers, and then fail to exercise the kind of oversight needed to protect probationers from abusive and extortionate practices. All too often, offenders on private probation are threatened with jail for failing to pay probation fees they simply cannot afford, and some spend time behind bars." In their report Human Rights Watch argue that leading private probation firms like Sentinel Offender Services and Judicial Correction Services, who face "serious allegations of abusive practices" have lacked government oversight.

In 2014, a Washington Post journalist listed some of the perils of private probation which included conflicting goals. Private enterprise must make profits and the more paying clients private probation companies have in the form of probationers, the more they earn for their equity firms. Probation programs seek rehabilitation so that people are "off of probation, out of the criminal justice system." Others argue that the financial interests of for-profit probation companies may lead to a deterioration of services or to corruption, both of which would disrupt the needs of offenders and communities. In one example, a member of the Georgia State Board of Pardons and Paroles was convicted on public corruption charges for accepting a bribe from a private probation agency. States generally forbid governmental officials from maintaining interests in private probation agencies, and some require that agencies post a surety bond to be allowed to supervise probationers.

== See also ==
- Parole
- Prison–industrial complex
- Probation
- Rehabilitation Policy
- Suspended sentence
