= Law Enforcement Assisted Diversion (US) =

Alternative to criminal prosecution program (US)

In the United States, Law Enforcement Assisted Diversion (LEAD) is a pre-booking diversion model that provides police with an alternative to criminal prosecution in cases involving low-level crimes related to drug use, mental health issues, and poverty. The multi-agency approach allows police officers to refer individuals to behavioral health services rather than arrest them. The model was developed in Seattle, Washington, where a pilot program was launched in 2011. LEAD programs have since been adopted nationally in the US.

== Philosophy, rationale and objectives ==
LEAD takes a harm reduction approach; in substance use cases, abstinence is not required. The primary goal is to reduce the harms caused by repeated interactions with the criminal justice system (CJS). Nearly a quarter of the over two million people incarcerated in the US are there for drug-related crimes, and substance use disorders (SUD) are more prevalent in the prison population than in the general public. Those with SUDs are at significantly greater risk of overdose death after involvement with the CJS. Additional goals include reducing reliance on the CJS, and improving working relationships between police and community-based service providers.

== History ==
In October 2011, LEAD was launched in Seattle as a four-year pilot program, with private foundation funding of $950,000 a year. The multi-agency collaboration included the Seattle Police Department, the King County Sheriff’s Office, the King County Prosecutor, the Seattle City Attorney, the Washington State Department of Corrections, Evergreen Treatment Services, the Washington American Civil Liberties Union (ACLU), and the Public Defender Association’s Racial Disparity Project. Rollout began in the drug-troubled Belltown neighborhood, with hand-picked participants: low-level drug dealers, addicts and prostitutes who had been repeatedly arrested. Individualized programs offered services including drug treatment, housing assistance, education, and microloans for business start-ups. The program proved successful and became LEAD Seattle/King County.

== Implementation ==
Police officers use their discretion to refer an individual arrested for minor offences to a case manager who assesses the client and creates a personalized intervention plan.

== Efficacy ==
Participants in the Seattle/King County LEAD program were less likely to be arrested and face felony charges, compared to those charged with similar crimes. Improvements in employment, housing, financial security, relationships with police and quality of life were noted.
