= Electronic monitoring in the United States =

Form of surveillance in the United States

Electronic monitoring or electronic incarceration (e-carceration) is state use of digital technology to monitor, track and constrain an individual's movements outside of a prison, jail or detention center. Common examples of electronic monitoring of individuals under pre-trial or immigrant detention, house arrest, on probation or parole include: GPS wrist and ankle monitors, cellphones with biometric security systems, ignition interlock devices and automated probation check-in centers or kiosks.

The use of electronic monitoring has increased considerably in recent years in the United States.

== Overview ==
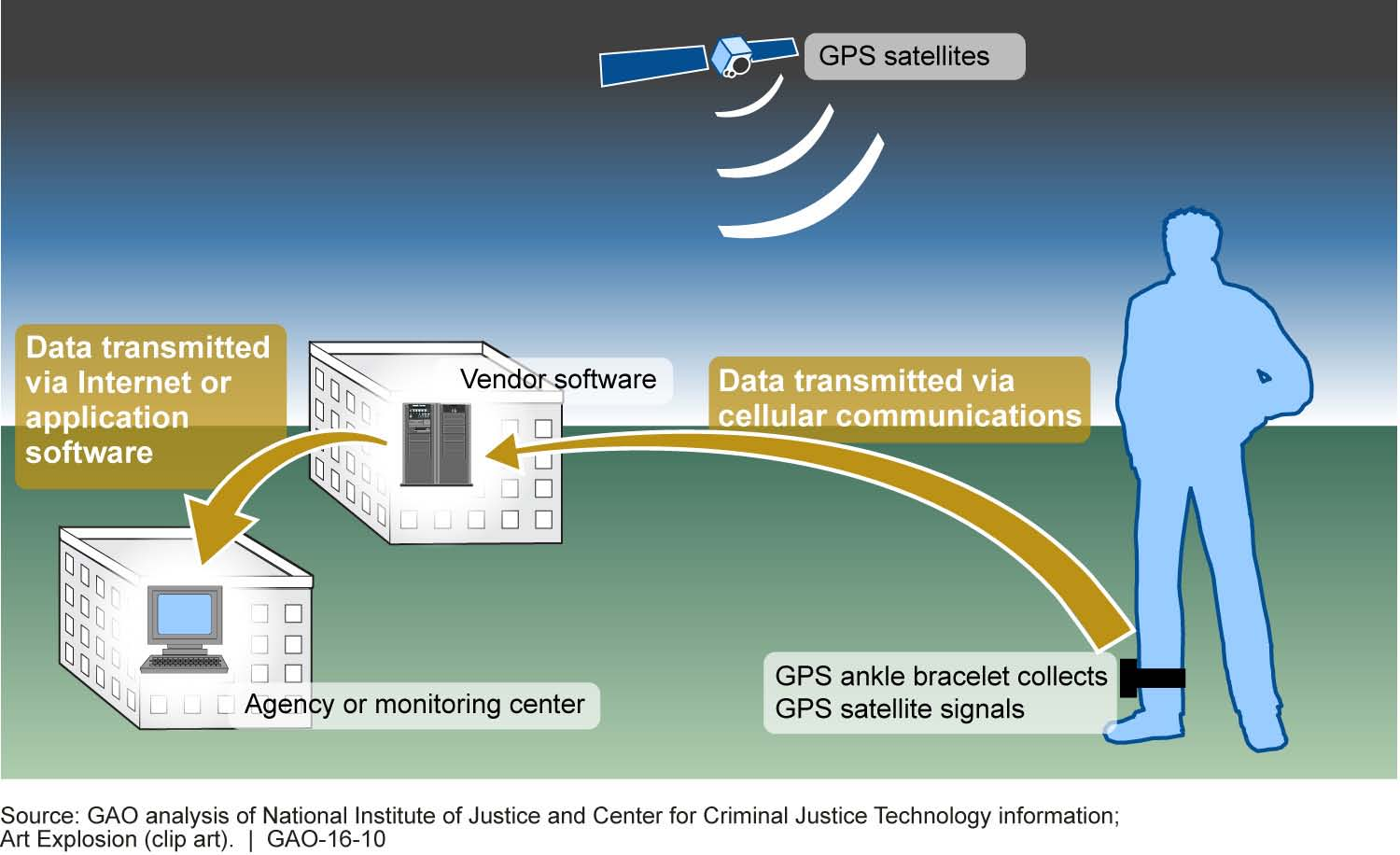
GPS-based tracking system used for some individuals released from prison, jail or immigrant detention.

According to a survey distributed by The Pew Charitable Trusts in December 2015, "the number of accused and convicted criminal offenders in the United States who are supervised with ankle monitors and other GPS-system electronic tracking devices rose nearly 140 percent over 10 years," resulting in more than 125,000 people under electronic supervision in 2015, an increase from 53,000 in 2005.

The federal government, the District of Columbia and all 50 states employ electronic devices to track and constrain the movements of pretrial defendants and convicts on probation or parole. GPS monitoring devices are most commonly used by law enforcement in Florida, Texas, California, Massachusetts, and Michigan. In 2020, approximately 4.5 million adults, twice the inmate population, were on probation or parole in what is commonly referred to as "community supervision," although only two percent were electronically supervised as recently as 2015.

== Decarceration to e-carceration ==
=== Shift in state budget priorities ===
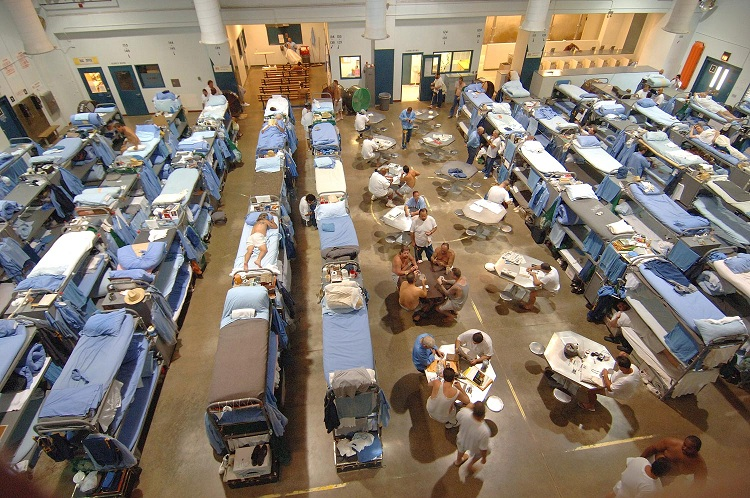
Prison overcrowding in CA led to a 2011 court order to reduce the state prison population by 30,000 inmates.

In the aftermath of decades-long tough on crime legislation that increased the US inmate population from 200,000 in 1973 to over two million in 2009, financially strapped states and cities turned to technology—wrist and ankle monitors—to reduce inmate populations as courts mandated inmate reductions in overcrowded prisons, and states realigned their budgets to address other priorities in education, housing and infrastructure.

=== Community control versus prison outsourcing ===
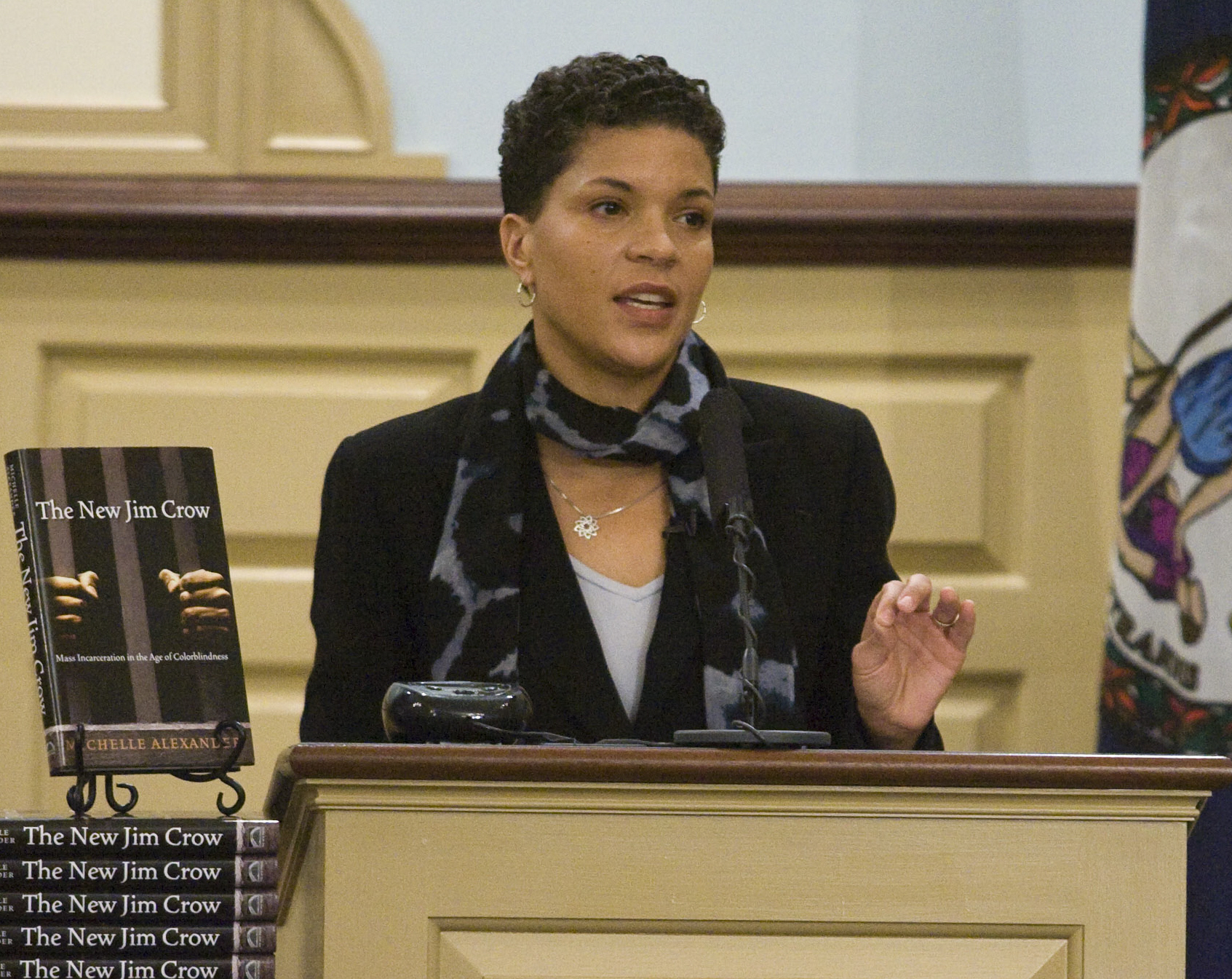
Michelle Alexander, author of The New Jim Crow.

In response to the shift from brick and mortar carceral institutions to what law enforcement termed "community control" under electronic monitoring, an oppositional movement pushed back, describing a widening net of "mass incarceration to mass surveillance" that threatened privacy and individual freedom while reinforcing social stratification, disrupting an individual's connections to the community and resulting in a subgroup of second-class citizens in the U.S., where African Americans are imprisoned at nearly six times the rate of white people. Michelle Alexander, author and civil rights advocate, refers to electronic ankle monitoring practices as the "Newest Jim Crow," increasingly segregating black people under bail reform laws that "look good on paper" but are based on a presumption of guilt and replace bail with shackles as pre-trial detainees consent to electronic monitoring in order to be released from jail. "Entire communities could 'become trapped in digital prisons that keep them locked out of neighborhoods where jobs and opportunity can be found'", says Alexander, who advocates re-integration of individuals into the community via quality schools, jobs, drug treatment and mental health services as opposed to "high-tech management and control."

On the other hand, advocates of "community control" argue electronic monitoring is humane—sometimes allowing pretrial detainees, who have not been convicted yet but make up most of the local jail population, as well as offenders on probation and parole, an opportunity to live at home with their families, enjoying freedom to move from one room to the next rather than confined in a 1.8×2.4 m cell. Electronic monitoring, they argue, saves cash-poor states valuable resources while benefitting offenders who can become productive. Says Ann Toyer of the Oklahoma Department of Corrections, "We get them back into the community where they can work, they pay taxes, they have access to community services ... If we can get them back into the community, get them working, they can pay for those services." In addition, proponents of electronic monitoring say the technology can be used to incapacitate violent criminals and reduce recidivism, though studies on the use of electronic monitors to reduce repeat offenses have produced mixed results.

==== EM as a predictive tool ====
Researchers anticipate electronic monitoring will be used to predict criminal behavior through software that tracks offenders' movements in a 24-hour period, tracing patterns to detect suspicious movements such as a convicted burglar driving around a neighbourhood at the same time every day.

== Types of electronic monitors ==
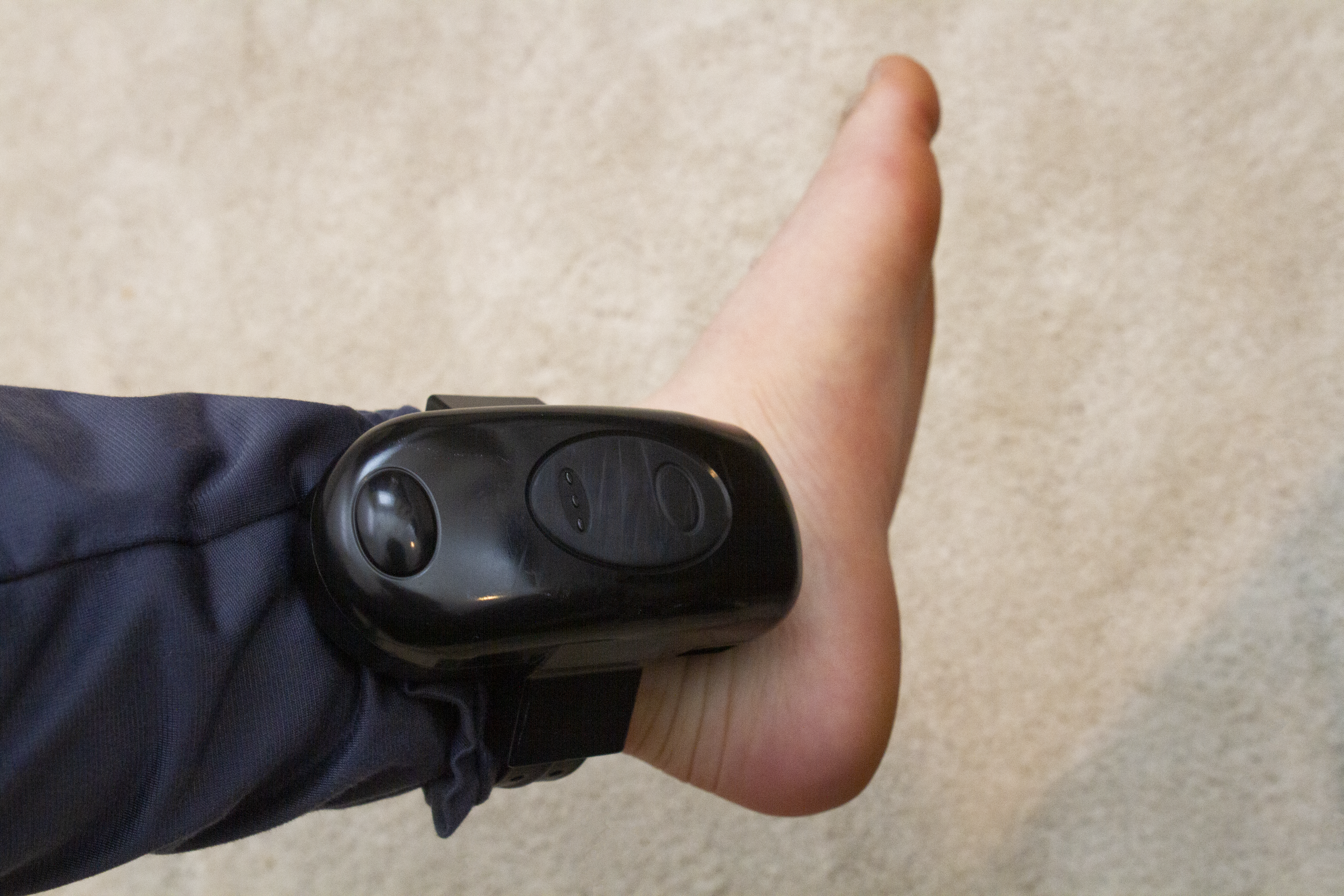
A GPS tracking device fastened to a person under house arrest.

=== Ankle and wrist monitors ===
Radio frequency (RF) ankle monitors are often used for curfew compliance with juveniles or individuals considered low risk for criminal behavior. In addition to wearing an ankle monitor, the individual sets up a separate monitoring unit at home. The unit can be programmed to detect an ankle or wrist monitor within a short range of 50 to 150 feet in order to send a message to a staffed monitoring station. The supervising officer can establish a person's schedule, requiring the individual to follow a daily routine, and ensuring that alerts are sent when the individual veers from the schedule or tampers with the ankle monitor.

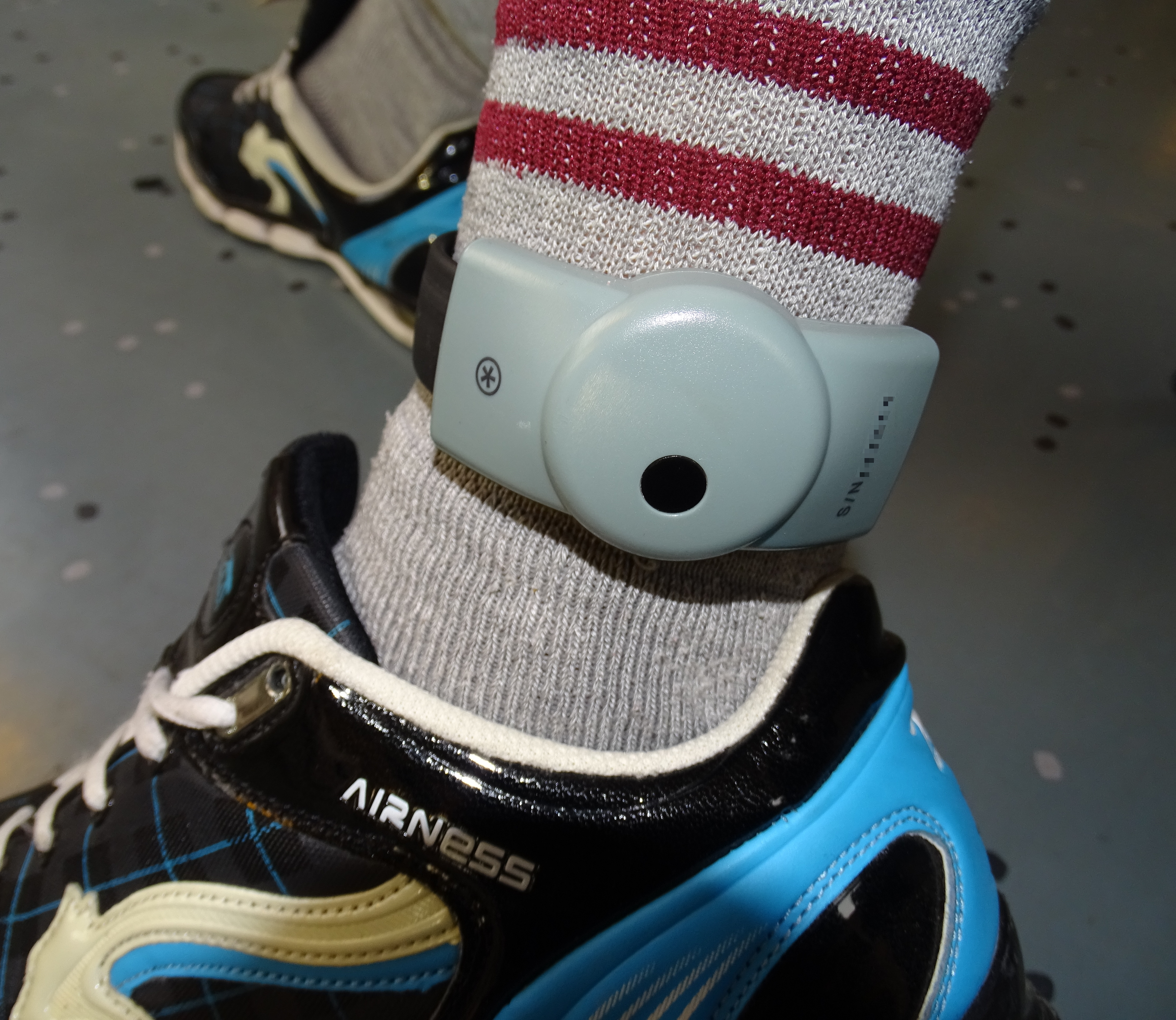
Proponents of EM call this an "ankle bracelet," while opponents refer to it as an "ankle shackle."

Higher risk offenders, such as sex offenders and domestic abusers, are more likely to wear a water and impact-resistant electronic monitoring (EM) device using Global Positioning System (GPS) for minute by minute tracking purposes. The ankle device runs on batteries to be charged once or twice a day and utilizes commercial cellular networks to transmit data points and location information anywhere in the world. Probation officers can program and map exclusion zones, where individuals are prohibited from entering, lest they set off an alert to their probation officer and risk a technical violation of their probation. Exclusion zones for sex offenders may include day care centers or schools. Supervising officers can also program buffer zones within a certain radius of a prohibited area, so an alarm will sound if the monitored individual approaches an exclusion zone.

Some ankle monitors are equipped to call and record people without warning. Others have microphones and speakers to record conversations that could be used in criminal cases, depending on state law.

While active GPS tracking allows for triangulation in transmittal of information, passive GPS tracking stores data that can be downloaded for a future time.

According to a study conducted by the East Bay Community Law Center of juveniles subjected to electronic monitoring in 58 California counties, any deviation from a daily schedule of school and work required the electronically monitored juvenile to seek permission from a supervising officer 24 hours to a week in advance of the schedule change. For adults under house arrest or other geographical restrictions, they may be prohibited from going grocery shopping, attending a child's school event, going to a beauty salon or washing clothes at a laundromat.

African Americans are more likely than whites to choose prison over electronic monitoring, though reasons for the preference are unclear. Probation officers report African Americans view electronic monitoring as more restrictive than white people perceive it.

Should an individual try to remove or succeed in removing an electronic device, consequences could include jail, prison time, fines or a tightening of the ankle monitor.

A male going only by the name of Christopher told the Marshall Project, a non-profit news service focused on criminal justice, that he had to wear an ankle monitor from the time he was 13, until he was 18, after having committed violations of his probation. In describing the monitor, Christopher said:

It was a black box with thick straps, and it weighed 3 pounds, which made walking kind of hard. At first, they put it on me loose, not skin-tight, which meant it would slam around whenever I exercised. But then some kids, apparently, started slipping the thing off, and so they brought us all in for tightening; they cinched it up right against my skin. I couldn’t wear high-top shoes anymore. It dug into me. I still have the scar.

=== Smartphones with biometric security systems ===
Proponents of using smartphones to track and constrain an individual through fingerprints, facial recognition and voice verification tout the cell phone's capability to integrate several features: Internet access; touchscreen interface; camera and video recording; location mapping and other applications. The tracking applications known as Smart-LINK and Shadowtrack may be installed on the individual's personal cellphone, referred to as a Bring Your Own Device (BYOD), or integrated into a cell phone law enforcement buys or leases from a vendor and then assigns to an individual upon their release into the community. The American Probation and Parole Association (APPA) supports the use of smart phones for surveillance because the organization believes the cell phone, with its calendar feature, cuts down on technical violations in which an offender misses an appointment with a probation officer.

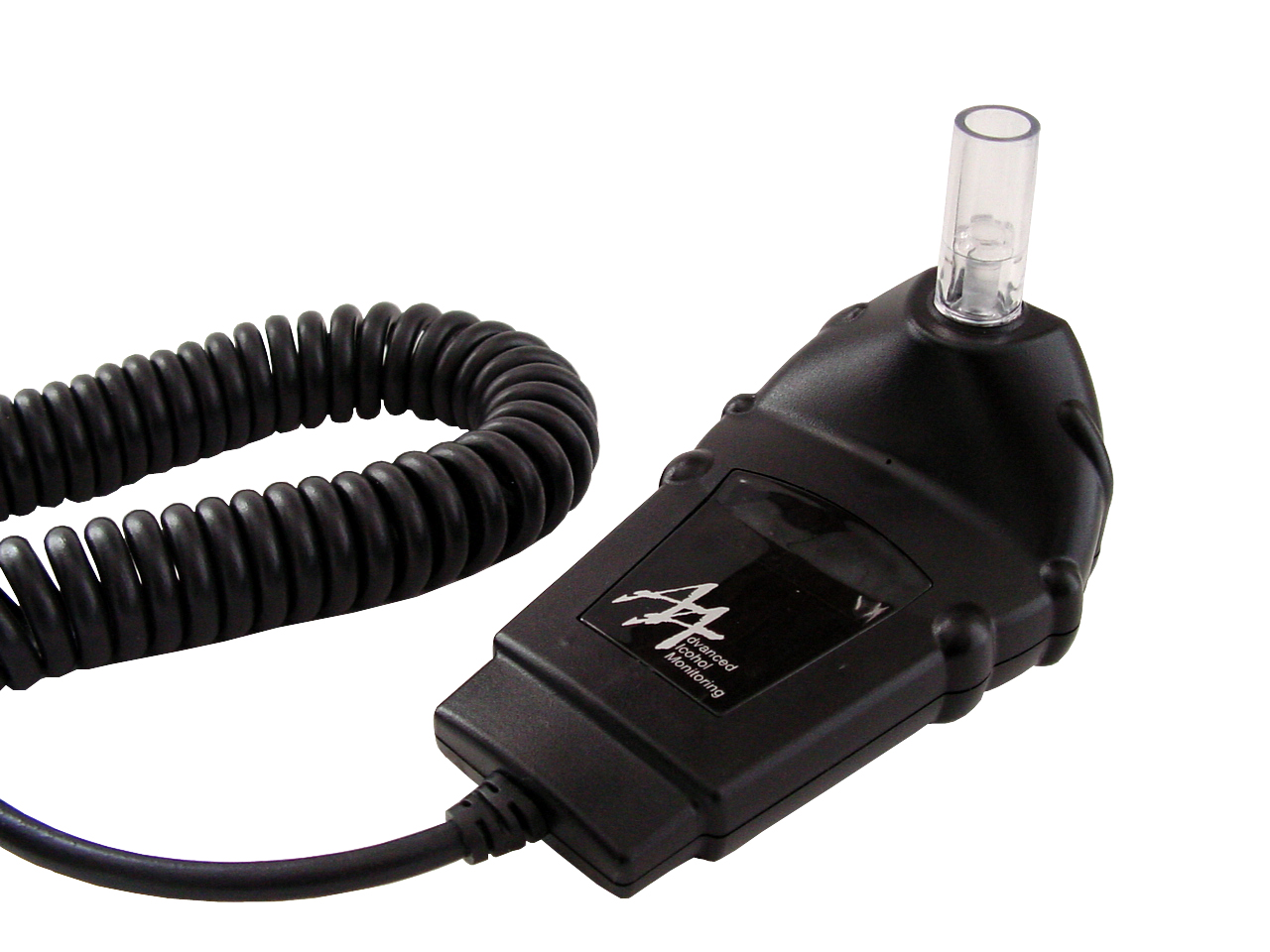
Automobile ignition interlock device

=== Automobile ignition interlock device ===
The California Department of Motor Vehicles describes an automobile ignition interlock device (IID) as a device the size of a cell phone that is wired to your car or truck's' ignition to require an individual to offer a breath sample before the engine will start. If the sample is not satisfactory or indicates alcohol consumption, the engine will not ignite. Periodic breath samples are required during a driver's route to ensure the driver is not stopping to drink along the way.

=== SCRAM ===
Secure Continuous Remote Alcohol Monitoring (SCRAM) in the form of a wrist band or hand-held device may be used to sample a client's breath and perspiration every 30 minutes to report blood alcohol level to a supervising officer. One SCRAM vendor advertises a "wireless, portable breath alcohol device with automated facial recognition and GPS with every single test."

=== Automated Parole or probation check-in platforms ===
In the early 1990s, New York City piloted 16 automated probation check-in machines, also known as probation kiosks, with each $750,000 kiosk featuring a video screen, keypad and infrared scanner for low-risk offenders to answer questions as to whether they had been re-arrested, obtained a job or needed counseling. By 2004, after a budget-strained NYC deemed the kiosk program a success, reducing costs while freeing probation officers to meet personally with priority high-risk offenders, the automated check-in centers were instituted for 30,000 offenders. By 2015, 70% of the city's probation population was expected to use the automated kiosks.

=== ION Wearable ===
ION Wearable was launched in 2021, and features a discreet wearable that can measure transdermal alcohol continuously, paired with a smartphone app to view data and send automatically generated reports. The sensor is based on patented and peer-reviewed enzymatic cartridge technology. Readings report alcohol consumption as 'clear' or 'signal detected', and the built-in skin proximity sensors can measure that the wearable is being worn continuously with an 'insufficient skin contact' if the wearable is removed. ION Wearable is being marketed to individuals wishing to rebuild trust after a DUI, custody case, or wanting to rebuild trust through connected support and accountability in the app.

== Costs and Benefits ==
Proponents of the use of electronic monitors to control individuals outside of carceral institutions argue that use of electronic monitoring reduces both the financial and social costs associated with incarceration. They assert that electronic monitoring allows individuals to be penalized in a more humane manner, allowing them to maintain a family life and participate in rehabilitation, with a net reduction in recidivism. They also assert that monitoring certain classes of offenders, such as sex offenders, may reduce recidivism. They argue that electronic monitoring can help address overcrowding in prisons and jails.

Critics of electronic monitoring express concern that it is used to effectively penalize people who have not yet been convicted of crimes, is often form the most punitive form of pretrial release, and constitute an invasion of privacy. They claim that electronic monitoring does not reduce recidivism and undermines rehabilitation by severing a person's ties to the community. They also point to technical failures and false alarms as increasing costs and burdens on law enforcement and probation officers. They object to the fees that may be incurred by a person who is being electronically monitored by private companies. They raise concerns that electronic monitoring effectively becomes an invisible form of incarceration, and that it can worsen racial disparities in the treatment of people charged with and convicted of crimes. They note that ankle monitors cause discomfort and may cause injury.

== Evaluations ==
According to a 2021 study in the Review of Economics and Statistics, which used the quasi-random assignment of judges in trials as a method to gauge causal inferences, electronic monitoring was far more effective in reducing recidivism than prisons.

=== National Institute of Justice evaluation: Florida ===
A 2001 National Institute of Justice study of 5,000 medium- and high-risk offenders in Florida who were placed under electronic supervision found a 31% decrease in the recidivism rate over a six-year period when compared with 266,000 offenders under other types of community supervision. Researchers from Florida State University's Center on Criminology and Public Policy Research also concluded that electronic monitoring based on Global Positioning Systems (GPS) produced better results than radio frequency (RF) systems, but that electronic monitoring, regardless of type, had less of an impact on violent offenders than others.

Researchers worked with the Florida Department of Corrections to interview local probation officers and over a hundred offenders. A majority of offenders said they felt ashamed to wear an electronic monitoring device and complained of stigmatization in a society in which ankle monitors are associated with sex criminals. Researchers interviewed one offender who described the electronic monitoring device as a "scarlet letter" of public humiliation, while another confided that each time the device's alarm went off, the offender thought the police were en route to make an arrest; still another worried about the message the ankle monitor sent to his child. "I’ve got a child who straps a watch on his ankle to be like daddy.”

=== Center of Juvenile and Criminal Justice: Indiana ===
In a 2006-2009 Indiana study of 293 subjects from 18 to 71 years, divided into two groups, those who had completed the Electronic Monitoring House Detention (EMHD) program and those who had not, researchers found the "odds of one recidivating after their release were two times higher for those who had successfully completed the EMHD program compared to the subjects who did not complete the program." The study also showed, however, that older and more educated offenders had a lower recidivism rate.

=== National Institute of Justice evaluation: California ===
==== Background: Jessica's Law ====
In November 2006, California voters passed Proposition 83, a ballot initiative colloquially known as Jessica's Law, prohibiting sex offenders from living within 2,000 feet of a school, day care center or park, and provided for lifelong GPS monitoring of high risk sex offenders. The California Department of Corrections and Rehabilitation (CDCR) was responsible for program implementation: distribution and assignment of monitors.

=== Studies of sex offenders and gang members ===
In the mid to late 2000s, the California Department of Corrections and Rehabilitation (CDCR) launched two pilot programs, one with sex offenders, the other with gang offenders, to evaluate the effectiveness of electronic monitors to reduce recidivism and encourage compliance with parole appointments.

In the sex-offender study involving 516 offenders divided evenly into a treatment and control group, researchers concluded the GPS monitors worked: offenders under GPS supervision were three times less likely to commit a sex crime violation as those who were not electronically monitored but met with parole officers. In contrast, the gang study involving 392 offenders in a treatment group and 392 offenders in a control group concluded the odds of a technical violation were 36 percent greater among the gang offenders on electronic monitoring, though the GPS group was 26% less likely to be re-arrested than the group supervised by in-person parole officers.

=== Jefferson County, Kentucky ===
In 2000, researchers Robert Stanz and Richard Tewksbury studied a cohort of offenders sentenced to house arrest in Jefferson County, KY. A majority who completed the electronic monitoring program were also rearrested within 5 years after house arrest ended. Of the 85% of offenders who completed the program, 69% of them were rearrested relatively shortly after they were released.

=== Alcohol Ignition Interlock Devices ===
Researcher Beirness and Marques (2004) summarized evaluations of the effectiveness of AUD programs for those arrested for driving under the influence in the United States and Canada. The effectiveness of AUD's was temporary, lasting for the duration of the AUD installation. While interlocks during their installation reduced alcohol-impaired driving recidivism in half when compared to similar offenders without the interlocks, recidivism increased once the AUD's were removed, resulting in similar recidivism rates between those who did and those who did not have AUD's installed.

== Electronically monitored immigrants ==
On July 18, 2018, in the middle of controversy over the Trump administration's family separation policy, National Public Radio (NPR) reported that during the Obama and Trump administrations Immigration and Customs Enforcement (ICE) had previously released 84,000 immigrants from detention centers to comply with a court order limiting family detention to three weeks. The released detainees were required to wear electronic ankle monitors or use smart phone check-in devices. The report compared the $320 per night cost of detaining an immigrant family in a detention center to the $14 per day cost of leasing an ankle monitor from the same company, GEO Group, that operates many of the detention centers.

NPR reported that in an email exchange with ICE, a spokesperson for the federal agency said "alternatives to detention" (ATD's) had a near 100% percent chance success rate, though the news outlet qualified the success rate to apply to appearances for immigration hearings, as opposed to deportation orders which could be delayed for years due to court backlogs.

Under the Trump administration, ICE cancelled another ATD, Family Case Management, a $36-a-day pilot project in which case workers in five cities steered approximately 1,000 migrants, often pregnant women or mothers, none of them electronically monitored, through the immigration court system, as well as schools, transportation and safe repatriation to their home country. The Inspector General reported a 99 percent compliance rate for ICE check-ins and appointments, and 100 percent success rate for court appearances.

In 2018, a year that saw 400,000 migrants cycle through detention centers, ICE canceled the Family Case Management program, citing expense and failure to deport enough asylum seekers. That same year the Trump administration budgeted $57 million for electronic monitoring of migrants in what it called "intensive supervision programs."

In response to complaints about ankle monitors inflicting leg pain and stigmatizing immigrants, ICE Spokesman Bryan Cox told the Miami Herald, “no one in ICE custody is required to wear an ankle monitor; however, when a custody determination is made based on the totality of the circumstances in any specific case, GPS monitoring may be required as a condition of release from custody.”

=== GPS and workplace raids ===
On August 24, 2019, the Miami Herald reported ICE—in a departure from the past—had gathered data from immigrants' GPS ankle monitors to locate workplaces employing migrant labor and then raid those workplaces, arresting nearly 700 employees earlier that month at seven Mississippi food processing plants in what was described as the "biggest single-day, one-state sweep in U.S. history."

=== COVID-19 EM releases ===
During the COVID-19 pandemic, ICE released more detainees, many with electronic ankle monitors, to avoid further outbreaks in crowded detention facilities where to "increase social distancing, detainees are locked in their cells for as long as 23 hours a day." In April 2020, the inmate population at ICE detention centers dropped from a daily average of 50,000 to 32,300 people, the lowest number of detainees during the Trump administration.

== Economics ==
=== Individual fees ===
The U.S. government assumes the cost of electronic monitors for some federal prisoners and detainees, though states and cities often require an individual wearing an electronic monitor to pay rental and battery fees, which for James Brooks, an Alameda County, CA. resident arrested for driving under the influence, led him to file a class action lawsuit against the county and its private electronic monitoring contractor. Brooks sued them for allegedly extorting him, threatening to send him back to jail if he did not pay his electronic monitoring fees, which ran as high as $13 a day or $400 per month with an enrollment fee of $150.00 and a default charge of $25.50 per day. Rental fees for ankle monitoring can range from $5 to $25 per day. In Kentucky, law enforcement can put an individual back in jail after missing three payments.

While some probation offices and county law enforcers operate their own electronic monitoring programs — renting the ankle monitors from manufacturers, hiring employees and collecting money from the person monitored, others, like Alameda County, have outsourced oversight of defendants, parolees and probationers to private for-profit companies. One suburb north of Seattle, Mountlake Terrace, reportedly profits off ankle monitoring, charging the individual monitored far more than the cost of the private contract fees, netting the suburb an extra $50,000 per year.

=== Federal, state and local savings ===
In 2012 the Urban Institute of the District of Columbia Crime Policy Institute compared the costs of incarcerating an individual in a brick and mortar institution with electronic monitoring. The Institute found that EM reduced costs to local agencies—counties, law enforcement—by an average of $580 per individual, while saving the federal government $920 per individual.

In 2014, the American Correctional Association estimated the cost of EM was $35.96 per day compared to $129 per night in a prison or jail.

=== EM as a business ===
According to the Center for Media Justice, a few large corporations — among them the GEO Group, one of the largest for-profit detention center operators — generate annual revenue of $200 million providing electronic monitoring devices for people on parole or probation in 30 states. Another company, Libre by Nexus, will post a cash bond to release an immigrant from detention, and then upon release charge the individual a daily fee to wear the company's electronic device, the price of which does not defray the cost of the bond. Securus, the country's largest prison telephone service, sold for $1.5 billion in 2017 to Platinum Equity, operates several electronic monitoring companies.

== History time-line ==
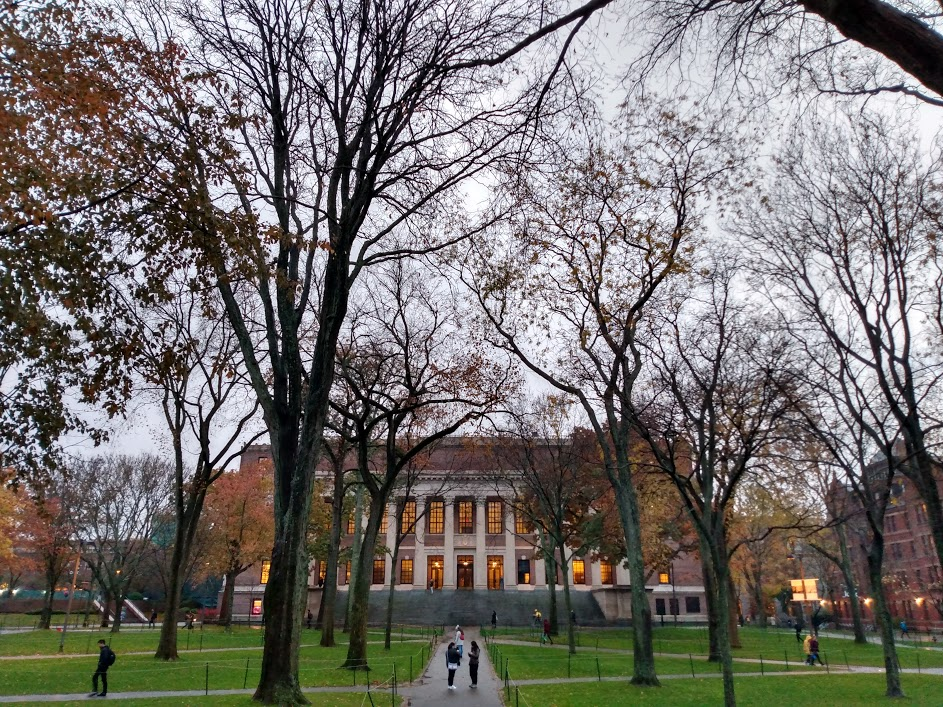
Harvard University, site of early experiments with electronic monitoring of juveniles.

1960s: Harvard University conducts a volunteer experiment to evaluate the effectiveness of GPS tracking devices to encourage "pro-social non-criminal" behavior among juveniles. Motivated by behavioral psychologist B. F. Skinner's experiments on the power of positive reinforcement with rats, graduate student researchers, mounting a main base-station atop the roof of Old Cambridge Baptist Church, apply a portable electronic tag or behavior transmitter-reinforcer to send data two-ways between a base station and volunteer young adult offenders. To evaluate the rehabilitative efficacy of wearing a monitoring device on the wearer's belt, messages were relayed to the subject's electronic tag as positive reinforcement when an acting young offender arrived on time to a specified place—school, workplace, drug treatment center. Reinforcement, designed to improve the odds of rehabilitation, came in the form of rewards, such as free haircuts, slices of pizza and tickets to concerts — all to motivate the "offenders" to comply with expected norms of behavior. Critics of the use of technology to track offenders charged it would make "automatons out of our parolees" and in the words of a newspaper editor, "the parole officer of the future will be an expert in telemetry, sitting at his large computer, receiving calls day and night, and telling his parolees what to do in all situations and circumstances [...] Perhaps we should also be thinking about using electronic devices to rear our children." In his defense, Robert Gable, one of the designers of the experiment, writes, "... the original goal of electronic monitoring was not to punish offenders but to provide a means of rewarding prosocial, noncriminal behavior."

1973: The military launches the first GPS project to improve existing navigation systems.

1980s: Following an airline accident, the Reagan administration announces GPS will also be available for civilian use. Meanwhile, Jack Love, a New Mexico State judge embraces EM technology after viewing a Spider-Man cartoon in which the antagonist slaps a "radar device" on Spider-Man. Love pitches EM to technology companies, leading to the production of the first transmitter unit, the size of a cigarette package, to be attached to an ankle.

1983: In 1983, For the first time, electronic monitoring was used in the United States' criminal justice system. Judge Burt Cosgrove of Metropolitan Court, sentenced for house arrest an offender, who is Mr. Romero, a 23 year old truck driver in Albuquerque, New Mexico, USA. He was convicted for an offence that he did not obey a police officer's order. He was house arrested for 30 days and he had to wear an electronic monitoring device that was the size of a cigarette package on his ankle. He was one of five criminal defendants here who served sentences of court supervision by means of an experimental ‘electronic monitoring anklet' alternate to imprisonment for minor offense or misdemeanor.

1990: All 50 states employ radio-frequency (RF) technologies to varying degrees to monitor and track individuals, such as sex offenders. New York City pilots automated probation check-in centers.

2009: An estimated 44,000 tracking monitors are deployed in the United States.

California electronically monitors high-risk gang members' violations of exclusion zones to reveal previously unknown gang networks.

Michigan and Massachusetts use EM to track domestic abusers, and at least two companies introduce systems allowing the victim's location to constitute a mobile exclusion zone off limits to offenders.

2010: 33 states pass legislation mandating released sex offenders wear electronic monitoring devices. Some states and counties also employ EM to track domestic abusers or inform former victims when offenders are released from prison.

2012: U.S. Supreme Court rules in United States v. Jones, law enforcement must obtain a probable-cause warrant to place a GPS tracker on a car.

2018: Parents worried about their teens running away or taking drugs turn to a Florida company to attach ankle monitors to their children. The U.S. Supreme Court rules in Carpenter versus the United States that police must obtain a warrant to access cell site location data from a cell phone company.

2019: North Carolina Supreme Court rules in State of North Carolina v. Torrey Grady that states cannot subject convicted sex offenders to lifetime electronic monitoring because the surveillance violates the individual's Fourth Amendment rights against unreasonable search.

2020: A Kentucky judge orders house arrest and ankle monitors for Louisville residents who refuse to quarantine after COVID-19 exposure.
