= Employment discrimination against persons with criminal records =

Employment discrimination against persons with criminal records varies from country to country. Many countries prohibit the official disclosure of certain convictions that happened long ago and allow ex-offenders to legally conceal their criminal past.

Ex-offenders often face employment discrimination by default when they search for work after completing their punishment. This discrimination is often enacted upon completion of employment applications that require responses about past criminal history. Many developed countries, such as Australia, Canada, United Kingdom and United States, have passed legislation prohibiting discrimination based on criminal record. However, the availability and extent of protection against discrimination for ex-offenders differs across jurisdictions.

Employers might be unwilling to hire those with criminal records for many reasons – such as the risk of legal liability if a previous offender harms a customer or coworker, the risk of financial liability if the offender engages in theft, fears of personal violence, and the negative signals that a period of incarceration sends about their general skills or trustworthiness. Public policies to assist offenders from obtaining employment therefore focus on allowing them to conceal convictions, although they accept that for a few professions such as police officers, it is necessary for the employer to know about the convictions. According to the document on Title VII Challenges to Employment Discrimination, between 25% and 40% of ex-offenders are unemployed and job prospects for criminal offenders are only expected to worsen as employers continue to gain easier and cheaper access to criminal records.

== See also ==
- Employment discrimination against persons with criminal records in the United States
