= Probation =

Period of supervision over an offender

Probation in criminal law is a period of supervision over an offender, ordered by the court often in lieu of incarceration. In some jurisdictions, the term probation applies only to community sentences (alternatives to incarceration), such as suspended sentences. In others, probation also includes supervision of those conditionally released from prison on parole. An offender on probation is ordered to follow certain conditions set forth by the court, often under the supervision of a probation officer. During the period of probation, an offender faces the threat of being incarcerated if found breaking the rules set by the court or probation officer.

Offenders are ordinarily required to maintain law-abiding behavior, and may be ordered to refrain from possession of firearms, remain employed, participate in an educational program, abide by a curfew, live at a directed place, obey the orders of the probation officer, or not leave the jurisdiction. The probationer might be ordered as well to refrain from contact with the victims (such as a former partner in a domestic violence case), with potential victims of similar crimes (such as minors, if the instant offense involves child sexual abuse), or with known criminals, particularly co-defendants. Additionally, offenders can be subject to refraining from the use or possession of alcohol and other drugs and may be ordered to submit to alcohol/drug tests or participate in alcohol/drug psychological treatment. Offenders on probation might be fitted with an electronic tag (or monitor), which signals their movement to officials. Some courts permit defendants of limited means to perform community service in order to pay off their probation fines.

== History ==
The concept of probation, from the Latin, probatio, "testing", has historical roots in the practice of judicial reprieve. In English common law, prior to the advent of democratic rule, the courts could temporarily suspend the execution of a sentence to allow a criminal defendant to appeal to the monarch for a pardon.

=== United States ===
Probation first developed in the United States when John Augustus, a Boston cobbler, persuaded a judge in the Boston Police Court in 1841 to give him custody of a convicted offender, a "drunkard", for a brief period and to help the man to appear rehabilitated by the time of sentencing.

Even earlier, the practice of suspending a sentence was used as early as 1830 in Boston, Massachusetts, and became widespread in U.S. courts, although there was no statutory provision for such a practice. At first, judges, most notably Peter Oxenbridge Thatcher of Boston, used "release on recognizance" or bail and simply refrained from taking any further action. In 1878, the mayor of Boston hired a former police officer, the ironically named "Captain Savage", to become what many recognize as the first official probation officer. By the mid-19th century, however, many Federal Courts were using a judicial reprieve to suspend sentences and this posed a legal question. In 1916, the United States Supreme Court, in Ex parte United States Petitioner Mandamus Judge Killets (also known as the Killets Case), held that Federal Judge Killets was without power to suspend a sentence indefinitely. This decision led to the passing of the National Probation Act of 1925, thereby, allowing courts to suspend the imposition of incarceration and place an offender on probation.

Massachusetts developed the first statewide probation system in 1878, and by 1920, 21 other states had followed suit. With the passage of the National Probation Act on March 5, 1925, signed by President Calvin Coolidge, the U.S. Federal Probation Service was established. At the state level, pursuant to the Crime Control and Consent Act of 1936, a group of states entered into an agreement wherein they would supervise probationers and parolees who resided in each other's jurisdictions on each other's behalf. Known as the Interstate Compact For the Supervision of Parolees and Probationers, this agreement was originally signed by 25 states in 1937. By 1951, all the states in the United States of America had a working probation system and ratified the Interstate Compact Agreement. In 1959, the new states of Alaska and Hawaii, the Commonwealth of Puerto Rico, and the territories of the Virgin Islands, Guam, and American Samoa ratified the act as well.

==== Probation in child support in the United States ====
When child support nonpayment was criminalized in the early 20th century, probation was the primary punishment levied on nonsupporters. Those in favor of criminalizing nonsupport wanted a penalty that "would maximize deterrence, preserve the family (at least in a financial sense), and lighten the burden on charities and the state to support women and children." When New York authorized probation as a punishment in 1901, the New York City magistrates cited four benefits to probation as opposed to incarceration: "(1) 'Punishment without disgrace, and effective without producing embitterment, resentment or demoralization,' (2) judicial discretion to make the punishment fit the crime, (3) '[p]unishment that is borne solely by the guilty and displacing a system that frequently involved the innocent and helpless,' and (4) punishment attended by increased revenue to the City and by a saving in expense.'" The existence of probation officers in child support cases made it so the state was involved in family life in previously unprecedented ways. Probation officers would often attempt to reconcile separated couples, encourage husbands to drink less alcohol, and teach wives housekeeping skills. Employing probation in nonsupport cases also led to more revenue captured by nonsupporting spouses. The National Probation Association (NPA) was instrumental in the creation of designated family courts in the United States as well, which subsequently assumed jurisdiction of nonsupport cases.

== Arming and increased authority ==
In the United States, most probation agencies have armed probation officers. In 39 states, territories and federal probation, such arming is either mandated or optional. Arming is allowed in an increasing number of jurisdictions.

Probation officers are commonly peace officers who possess limited police powers and in some instances, are employed via the court system and take on a more bureaucratic, social worker role.

== Types ==
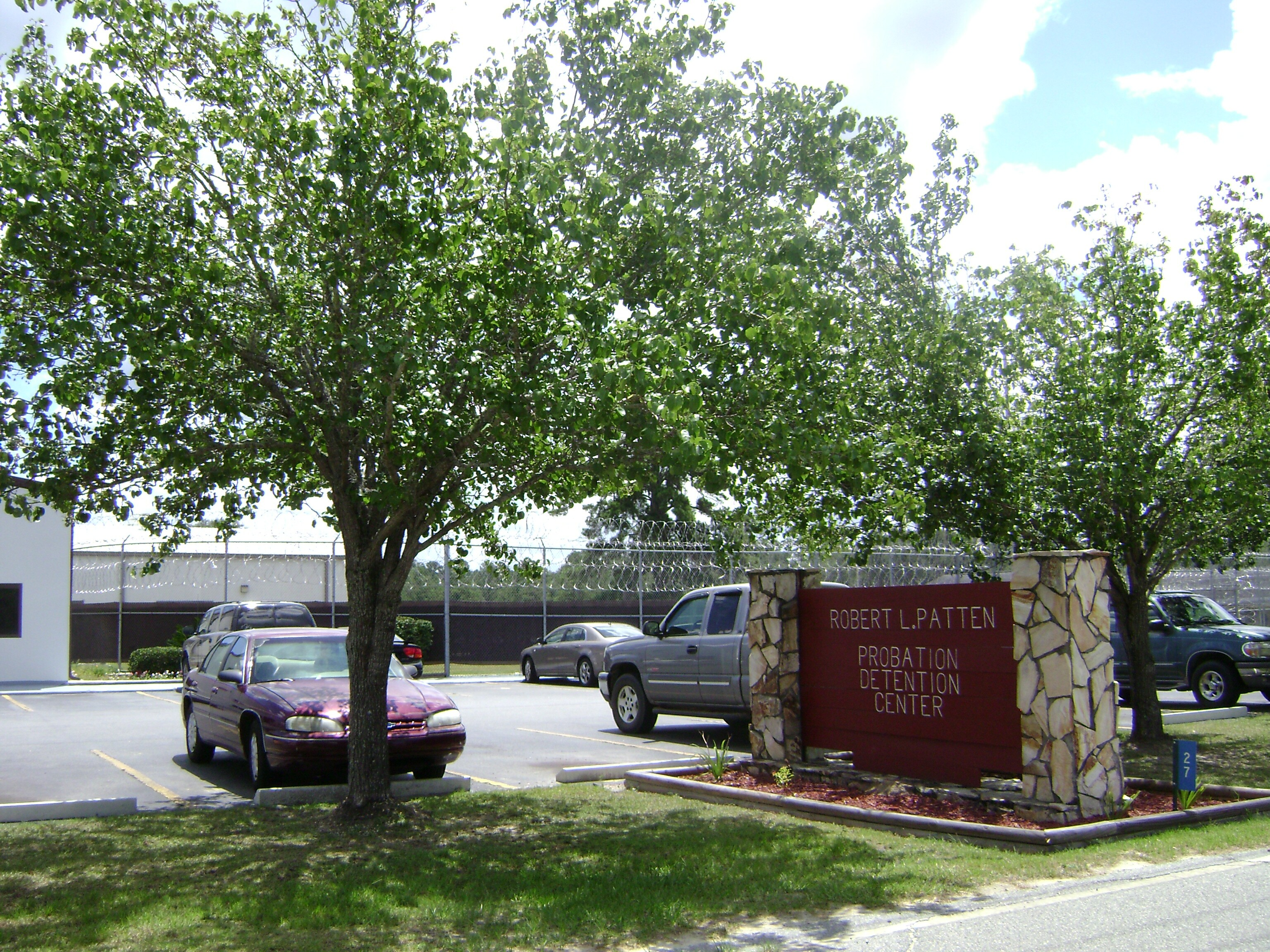
Robert L. Patten Probation Detention Center in Lakeland, Georgia

=== Intensive ===
Home detention, GPS monitoring and computer management are highly intrusive forms of probation in which the offender is very closely monitored. It is common for violent criminals, higher-ranking gang members, habitual offenders, and sex offenders to be supervised at this level. Some jurisdictions require offenders under such supervision to waive their constitutional rights under the Fourth Amendment regarding search and seizure, and such probationers may be subject to unannounced home or workplace visits, surveillance, and the use of electronic monitoring or satellite tracking. Under terms of this kind of probation, an offender may not change their living address and must stay at the address that is known to probation. GPS monitoring and home detention are common in juvenile cases, even if the underlying delinquency is minor. Some types of supervision may entail installing some form of monitoring software or conducting computer searches to ascertain what an offender is doing online. Cybercrime specialist in corrections, Art Bowker, noted: "This is an area more and more community corrections officers are going to have to get up to speed on, learning how to enforce conditions that restrict and/or monitor cyber offenders' computer and internet use." Bowker, also observed that "The use of social media is taking off in the field of community corrections".

=== Standard ===
Offenders under standard supervision are generally required to report to an officer, most commonly between biweekly and quarterly, and are subject to any other conditions as may have been ordered, such as alcohol/drug treatment, community service, and so on.

=== Unsupervised ===
Some probation does not involve direct supervision by an officer or probation department. The probationer is expected to complete any conditions of the order with no involvement of a probation officer, and perhaps within a period shorter than that of the sentence itself. For example, given one year of unsupervised probation, a probationer might be required to have completed community service and paid court costs or fines within the first six months. For the remaining six months, the probationer may be required merely to refrain from unlawful behavior. Probationers are allowed to go to their workplaces, educational institutions, or places of worship. Such probationers may be asked to meet with an officer at the onset or near the end of the probationary period, or not at all. If terms are not completed, an officer may file a petition to revoke probation.

=== Informal ===
Informal probation may occur with deferred adjudication, without the defendant's having been convicted of a criminal offense, or may occur following a guilty plea pending the completion of terms set forth in a plea agreement. As with other forms of probation, terms may include drug testing or waiver of Fourth Amendment rights for the duration of the term of probation. At the end of the informal period, the case is typically dismissed. This is usually offered as part of a plea bargain or pre-trial diversion.

=== Shock ===
Some programs give a sentencing judge the power to reconsider an original jail sentence. The judge may recall the inmate from jail and put them on probation within the community instead. The courts have a theory that a short term in jail may "shock" a criminal into changing their behavior. Shock probation can be used only between a specific period of 30–120 days after the original sentence, and is not available in all states.

== Grant of probation ==
Community corrections officials are key personnel in helping decide whether a criminal is granted probation. They determine whether the offender is a serious risk to the public and recommend to the court what action to take. Correction officials first go through an investigation process during the pretrial period. They assess the offender's background and history to determine whether the offender can be released safely back into the community. The officers then write a report on the offender. The courts use the report to determine whether the offender shall be put on probation instead of going to jail. After the offender is found guilty, the probation officer puts together a pre-sentence investigation report (PSI). Courts base their sentencing on it. Finally, courts make their decisions as to whether to imprison the convict or to assign probation. If a court decides to grant a person probation, they must then determine how to impose the sentence based on the seriousness of the crime, recidivism, the circumstances of the convict, and the recommendations from the corrections officials.

== Violation ==
A probation officer may imprison a probationer and petition the court to find that the probationer committed a violation of probation. The court will request that the defendant appear at a show cause hearing at which the prosecutor must demonstrate by a preponderance of the evidence that the defendant committed a probation violation. If the defendant pleads guilty to a probation violation, or is found guilty of a probation violation after the hearing, the officer or prosecutor may request that additional conditions of probation are imposed, the duration is extended or that a period of incarceration is ordered, possibly followed by a return to probation. No law specifies when probation violation proceedings must be commenced, although probation violation proceedings are nearly certain to occur following the defendant's conviction of a subsequent offense or failure to report to the probation officer as ordered.

If a violation is found, the severity of the penalties may depend upon the facts of the original offense, the facts of the violation, and the probationer's criminal history. For example, if an offender is on probation for a gang-related offense, subsequent "association with known criminals" may be viewed as a more serious violation than if the person were on probation for driving a car with a suspended license; the reverse may be true if the initial offense were for driving under the influence. Similarly, penalties for violation may be greater if a subsequent offense is of greater severity (such as a felony, following a misdemeanor), or if the original offense and subsequent offense are of the same type (such as a battery following an assault, or retail theft following retail theft).

=== Failing a drug test ===
Court-ordered drug and alcohol testing may be included as a standard or special condition of probation.

A failed drug test while on probation may be reported by the probation officer to the court and may result in probation violation proceedings. At the hearing a judge will determine if the violation warrants revocation of probation, incarceration, additional probation time, or other sanctions.

=== Revocation ===
When a probation violation is extremely severe, or after multiple lesser violations, a probation revocation hearing could be scheduled. A judge at the hearing will consider reports from the probation officer, and if probation is revoked, the probationer will often be incarcerated in jail or prison. However, the term of incarceration might be reduced from the original potential sentence for the alleged crime(s). It is possible that an innocent defendant would choose to accept a deferred sentence rather than incur the risk of going to trial. In such a case, a probation revocation can result in conviction of the original criminal charges and a permanent record of conviction.

== Early release ==
Judges may have the power to alter and amend the probation terms, conditions and period. Such powers are commonly held by judges in the United States. Pursuant to the authority of a court, it may be possible for a defendant to apply for early discharge from probation after some of the probation period has been completed. For example, in the U.S. state of Georgia an offender may apply for early termination of felony probation after serving at least three years of the sentence.

In the U.S., when deciding whether to grant early discharge a judge will typically consider factors such as whether the probationer has complied with all the terms of probation, paid all fines, fees, court costs and restitution and would experience a hardship if the probation period continued.

== See also ==
- Lifetime probation
- Parole
- Private probation
- Probation Journal
- Rehabilitation policy
- Suspended sentence
