= Thompson High School =

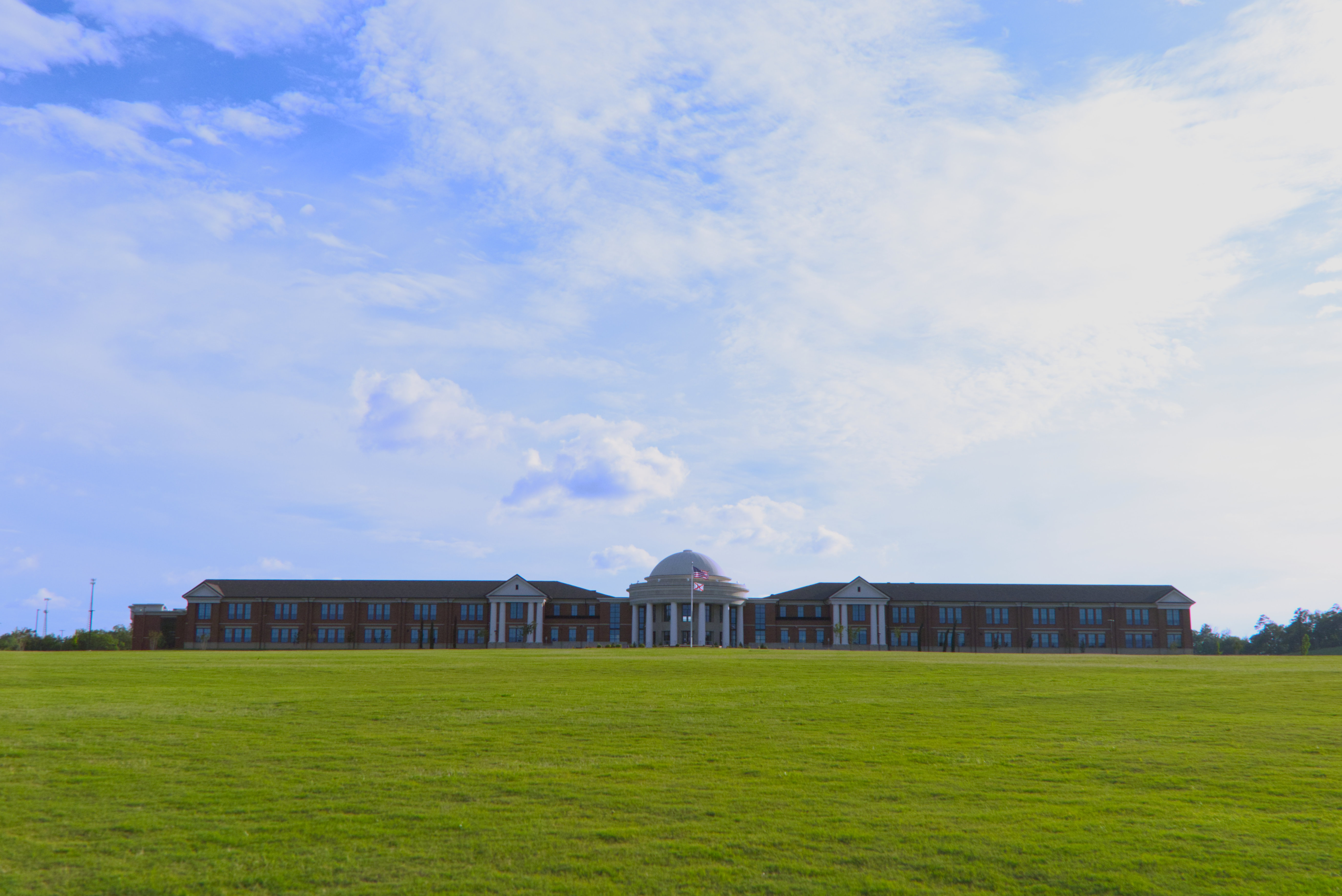
- Thompson High School

Location
- 1921 Warrior Parkway; Alabaster, Alabama 35007; United States; 33°13′21″N 86°50′45″W

Information
- School type: Public
- Established: 1921 (105 years ago)
- School district: Alabaster City Schools
- CEEB code: 012485
- Principal: Wesley Hester
- Teaching staff: 127.76 (FTE)
- Grades: 9–12
- Enrollment: 2,132 (2023-2024)
- Student to teacher ratio: 16.69
- Colors: Scarlet, black, and white
- Nickname: Warriors
- Website: www.acsboe.org/o/ths

Thompson High School is a public high school established in 1921 in Alabaster, Alabama.

== History ==
In the early 1920s, Shelby County Schools had determined there was enough population in the northwestern area of Shelby County to create a high school. The new school was selected to be in the small community of Siluria. There had already been an existing junior high school and elementary school in the community, which now fed into the high school. The new school named Thompson High School served the communities of Siluria, Shelbyville (now Pelham), Helena, Brantleyville, Maylene, Saginaw, and several other small communities/unincorporated areas through the early times of the school's existence. The school was named after Thomas Carlyle Thompson, who donated the land and most of the funds to build the original high school building which is where the intermediate center is currently located.

Thompson High School's first official school day was October 3, 1921. The first "school bus" provided to THS was a covered wagon pulled by two mules and owned by a local man named Mr. Faust. From the 1920s to the 1950s, the school was a quiet country school, nothing major happened apart from the school not fielding a football team during World War II from 1942-1945. In 1951, the original high school buildings burned down with nothing to salvage, leading to the construction of a new high school. The 1952 THS building was then built, which is still standing as Thompson Intermediate School.

The 1950s and early 1960s didn't see much action with the community or school, however by the late 1960s and early 1970s the school's hometown of Siluria was being rapidly outpaced by the newer city of Alabaster, which annexed Siluria in 1971. This made Thompson synonymous to the city of Alabaster, which it still is to this day. The late 1970s and 1980s saw a major increase in enrollment, as many people were leaving the city of Birmingham for communities south of the city. The first attempt of reducing enrollment led Shelby County Schools to create a new zone for Pelham and Helena, creating Pelham High School in 1973. This was Thompson's major rival in multiple sports, they played a football game every year until 2017. This reduction only held the growing population for so long, with the 1952 school soon reached design capacity, leading to the construction of a new high school in 1987. This building is now Thompson Middle School after the high school was moved a few decades later. Alabaster continued to grow along with communities surrounding, making Thompson one of the largest schools in the 1990s and 2000s.

By 2011, the City of Alabaster had determined they wanted to create a city school system and bring Thompson with it. The school system was completely split on July 1, 2013, being a part of Alabaster City Schools. This split happened near the same time Pelham City Schools became independent on July 1, 2014. This allowed Shelby County Schools time to readjust school zones and set up new zoning for Helena High School which split Pelham's student body. Some communities such as Saginaw and Brantleyville could no longer attend Thompson as the school system was zoned for city limits only. A new rush of people began coming into Alabaster and Pelham after hearing the schools had become independent, now overwhelming the 1987 building which was originally designed for 800 students, but housed 1900 in its last year as a high school. A new 360,000 square foot building was soon built on 300 acres of land, the first day for students was February 26, 2018. The school is easily identifiable by the front rotunda and water fountain. Since the construction of the new school, Thompson has seen renewed interest in athletics funding, now primarily dominating the football scene.

== Athletics ==
The school mascot is the Warriors. The school colors are red, white, and black. It participates in 7A level sports in Alabama. The school's wrestling team, established in 2007, won five state titles in a row (four 6A and one 7A) from 2011 to 2016. The wrestling team won its sixth state title in 2018 (7A).

=== Football ===
The Thompson High School Football team went 12–1 during the 2017 season, defeating Hoover High School to win the 7A Region 3 championship before losing to Hoover in the state semi-finals. In 2018, Thompson's football team advanced to the AHSAA 7A Finals for the first time in over three decades and were defeated by Central-Phenix City

In 2019, the Warriors went 12–1 and advanced to the AHSAA 7A Finals where they beat the Central-Phenix High School Red Devils 40–14, giving Thompson their 1st football state championship since 1983. Thompson continued their domination by defeating Auburn High School in 2020, Central-Phenix City again in 2021, and Auburn again in 2022, winning four 7A state titles in a row.

In 2023, Central-Phenix City defeated Thompson 21-19 to win the championship, but Thompson avenged the loss by beating Central-Phenix City 21-7 in the 2024 championship game.

In 2025 Thompson defeated Opelika 48-10 to win the championship game.

Since 2018, only 4 teams have appeared in the 7A championship game: Thompson, Central-Phenix City, Auburn and Opelika.

Mark Freeman is currently the Thompson head football coach.

The 2019 fall eSports season was the first for Thompson, and the Warriors went all the way to the finals to face off against Bob Jones High School for the AHSAA League of Legends State Championship. The Warriors lost the first match but came back and won two straight to win the title.

=== State championships ===
- Football: 1982 (3A), 2019 (7A), 2020 (7A), 2021 (7A), 2022 (7A), 2024 (7A), 2025 (7A)
- Wrestling: 2011 (6A), 2012 (6A), 2013 (6A), 2014 (6A), 2015 (7A), 2018 (7A), 2019 (7A), 2020 (7A), 2022 (7A)
- Boys Basketball: 1976 (3A), 1977 (3A)
- Girls Bowling: 2025 (6A/7A), 2026 (6A/7A)
- Boys Bowling: 2020 (6A/7A)
- Softball: 1998 (5A/4A), 1999 (6A), 2022 (7A), 2025 (7A)
- Volleyball: 1979 (3A), 1981 (3A), 1982 (3A)
- E-Sports: 2019, 2020, 2021 (No classification)

== New high school building ==
In 2018, Alabaster City Schools opened the new Thompson High School. The new, state-of-the-art school totals 360,000 sq ft (33,000 m^{2}), and includes: dedicated classrooms for each academy, a 2,500-seat arena-style gymnasium, an auxiliary gym, new baseball and softball facilities, tennis courts, competition track and a 5,300 seat football and soccer stadium, which houses an indoor practice facility.

== Notable alumni ==
- Drew Avans, baseball player
- Jim Davenport, baseball player
- Conner Harrell, football player
- Chaney Johnson, basketball player
- Amari Kight, football player
- Brandon King, football player
- Rebecca Luker, actress and singer
- T.J. Rayam, football player
- Taulia Tagovailoa, football player
- Peter Woods, football player
- Colben Landrew basketball player
