= Thompson Middle School =

Thompson Middle School may refer to one of these schools:

- Thompson Middle School (Alabama) in Alabaster, Alabama
- Thompson Middle School (New Jersey) in Middletown Township, New Jersey
- Harry B. Thompson Middle School in Syosset, New York
- Willie Thompson Middle School in Saginaw, Michigan
