= Jalen Rayam =

Canadian gridiron football player (born 2000)

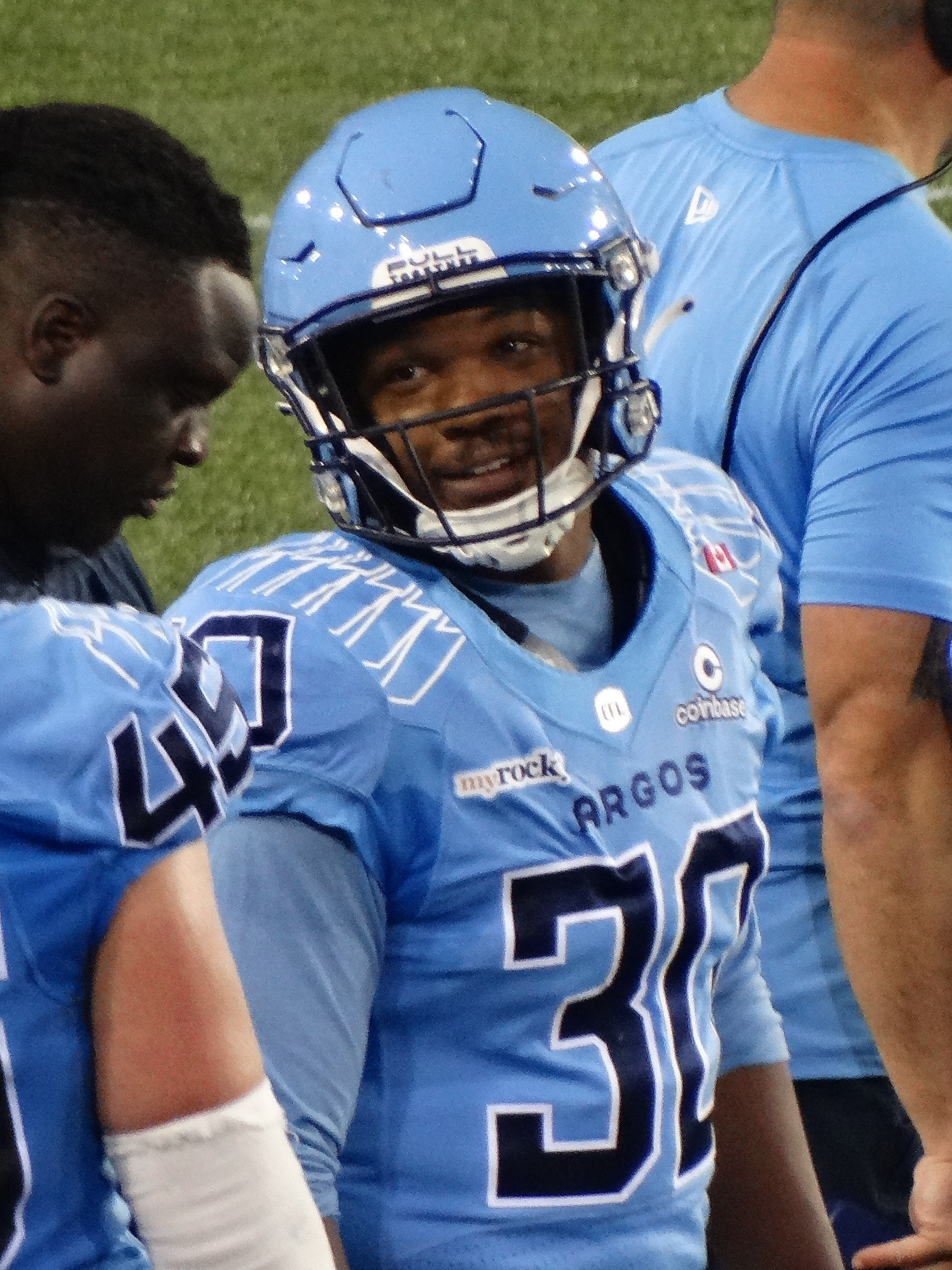
- Rayam with the Toronto Argonauts in 2026

No. 30 – Toronto Argonauts
- Position: Linebacker
- Roster status: Active
- CFL status: National

Personal information
- Born: August 15, 2000 (age 26); Calgary, Alberta, Canada
- Listed height: 6 ft 1 in (1.85 m)
- Listed weight: 220 lb (100 kg)

Career information
- High school: Thompson High
- College: Texas at El Paso (2018–2021); Middle Tennessee State (2022–2023); Alabama at Birmingham (2024)
- CFL draft: 2025: 5th round, 46th overall pick

Career history
- 2026–present: Toronto Argonauts
- Stats at CFL.ca

Jalen Rayam (born August 15, 2000) is a Canadian professional football linebacker for the Toronto Argonauts of the Canadian Football League (CFL).

== University career ==
Rayam first played college football for the UAB Blazers in 2018. He played in four games in 2018, recording two tackles, before using a redshirt season and then missed all of 2019 due to injury. In 2020, he played in seven games and had five tackles and then played in eight games in 2021 where he had ten tackles.

Rayam transferred to Middle Tennessee State University in 2022 where he played for the Blue Raiders. In his first year with Middle Tennessee State, he played in 13 games, starting in one, where he had 36 tackles. He then missed his entire senior year in 2023 due to injury. Rayam transferred again, this time to the University of Texas at El Paso where he played in one game for the Miners where he suffered a season-ending injury on the third play of the game.

== Professional career ==
Rayam was selected by the Toronto Argonauts in the fifth round, 46th overall, in the 2025 CFL draft, but did not play in 2025. He then signed with the Argonauts on January 9, 2026. Following training camp with the team, he was part of the final cuts and was released on May 31, 2026. However, Rayam was re-signed by the team on July 7, 2026. He soon after made his professional debut on July 10, 2026, against the Winnipeg Blue Bombers.

== Personal ==
Rayam's father, Thomas Rayam, played professionally as an offensive lineman for the Cincinnati Bengals, Birmingham Barracudas, Edmonton Eskimos, Calgary Stampeders, and Argonauts. Rayam's brother, T. J. Rayam, played as a defensive lineman for the Stampeders.
