= Pelham High School (Alabama) =

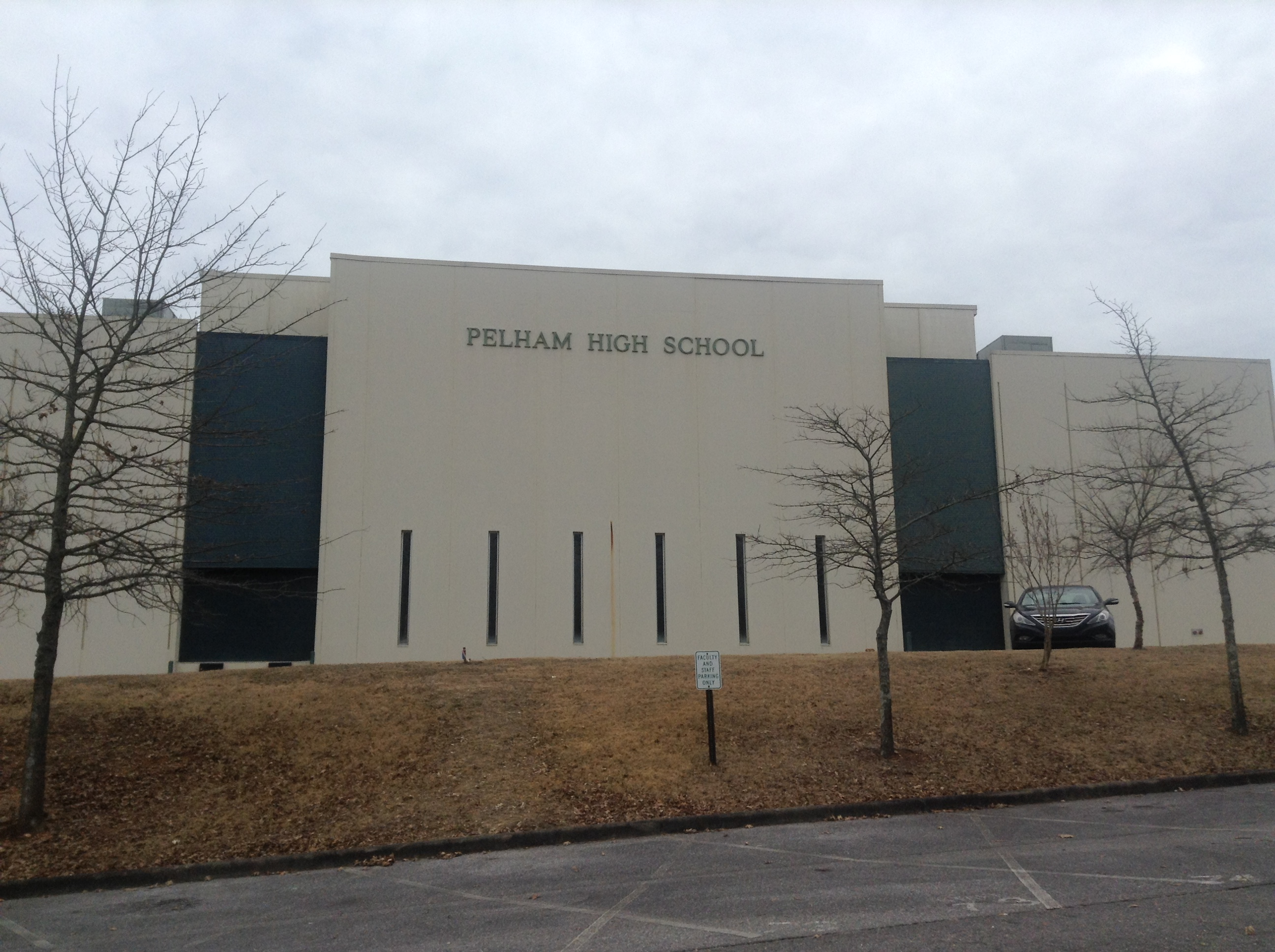

Location
- 2500 Panther Circle; Pelham, Alabama 35124; United States; 33°18′43″N 86°49′16″W

Information
- Type: Public
- Motto: "It's a great day to be a Panther!"
- Opened: 1974 (52 years ago)
- School district: Shelby County Schools (1974-2014); Pelham City Schools (2014-)
- CEEB code: 012111
- Principal: Kim Kiel
- Teaching staff: 70.03 (on FTE basis)
- Grades: 9-12
- Enrollment: 1,100 (2023-2024)
- Student to teacher ratio: 15.71
- Colours: Forest green and Old gold
- Athletics conference: AHSAA
- Team name: Panthers
- Website: phs.pelhamcityschools.org

Pelham High School is a public high school located in Pelham, Alabama. Though formerly part of the Shelby County School System, it has been part of the Pelham City Schools System since 2014. Pelham High School was built in 1973 and opened in 1974. The school's mascot is "Paws" the Panther, and its colors are Forest Green and Vegas Gold.

== History ==
The school was built in 1973 and opened in 1974 with the first graduating class in 1978. Since then, the school has experienced tremendous growth requiring several major additions and renovations to the campus. During the 1994 Palm Sunday tornado outbreak an F2 tornado struck on Highway 261 causing damage to the school, as well as some business buildings in Pelham.

As of June 1, 2014, the city of Pelham separated itself from the Shelby County School System and became part of its own school district known as Pelham City Schools. The 2014-2015 school year was not only the first year where Pelham operated independently, but also the first year that residents of Helena, Alabama, would not be attending Pelham High School due to the official opening of Helena High School in August 2014.

== Administration ==
Former Pelham principal Bob Lavett served over two decades at the high school. He retired as principal in late May 2014 to begin working part-time as an assistant to Superintendent Scott Coefield. In June 2014, after Lavett’s retirement, the Pelham Board of Education hired Jason Yohn as the new principal of Pelham High School. Yohn was formerly the principal at Smiths Station High School in Smiths Station, Alabama, where he worked for six years. The Pelham Board of Education also hired John Prestridge as assistant principal.

The current principal of Pelham High School in Ms. Kim Kiel, who replaced Dr. Amanda Wilbanks after her departure to Alabaster City Schools.

== Athletics ==
Baseball - The Pelham High School Varsity Baseball team won the 2004 and 2013 AHSAA State Championships. Volleyball - The Pelham High School Varsity Volleyball team won the 2017 Class 6A AHSAA State Championships. Soccer - The Pelham High School Varsity Boys Soccer team won the 2017 Class 6A AHSAA State Championships. Indoor Track - The Pelham High School Girls Indoor Track team won the 2016 Class 6A AHSAA State Championships.

== Music programs ==
=== Band ===
Pelham High School has had a band program since the school opened in 1974. The band has received excellent ratings at marching and auxiliary competitions, as well as concert band festivals. The band program currently has several groups: the "Tower of Power" marching band, which includes visual ensemble members in the color guard, dance team, and majorettes; a jazz band; and two concert groups, the wind ensemble and the symphonic band. Jim Duren was band director from 1987 to 1999 before moving on to become the director at Oak Mountain High School. When Duren left, Jeff Burnside took over as Pelham's band director in 1999 and stayed until the Pelham/Helena split in 2014, when he took a job as Helena High School's band director. The current Pelham band director is Justin Ward, who previously served as the assistant director to Jeff Burnside from 2011 to 2014.

== Organizations and clubs ==
- Color Guard - In the Fall, the group competes with the Pelham High School Marching Band as an auxiliary component of the Visual Ensemble in Bands of America and other local band competitions. From November through early April, the Pelham High School Winter Guard competes in the South Eastern Color Guard Circuit (SCGC) and Winter Guard International (WGI). They have been recognized for their superior performances at competitions across the South East, and have received multiple state and regional titles in classes SRAA, SRA, SAAA, SAA, and SA since 2005.
- Debate - Pelham recently resurrected their debate team. In 2006, Pelham had public forum teams place first, fifth, and sixth at Vestavia Hills High School's Novice Tournament. Pelham also had public forum teams finish as finalists and semi finalists in the 2007 Alabama state debate tournament. Pelham's Public Forum team of Brandon Grimes and Loren Willis qualified for the National Forensic League's high school national tournament in 2007. Also produced current University of Alabama debate team member Jacob Forehand who was the 7th best speaker nationally in 2009 in Parliamentary Debate.
- Scholars' Bowl - The Pelham High School varsity scholars' bowl team won the Shelby County championship title in 2004, 2006, 2008, 2009, and 2012. In 2007, the junior varsity team placed first in the Shelby County tournament.

== Notable alumni ==
- Liz Cochran (2006), Miss Alabama in 2009
- Deidre Downs (1998), Miss America in 2005
- Brent Hinds (1992), guitarist/vocalist for Mastodon
- David Koonce (1999), bass guitarist for Within Reason
- Alex Reese (2017), NBA player
- Dabo Swinney (1988), former University of Alabama receiver & current head coach/receivers coach at Clemson University.
- Tyler Watts (1998), former University of Alabama Quarterback & current radio broadcaster for Crimson Tide Sports Network.
- Troy Wagner, co-creator and director of the YouTube web series Marble Hornets
- Joseph DeLage, co-creator and director of the YouTube web series Marble Hornets
- Michael Proctor, former University of Alabama kicker, state FG distance recorder-holder
