= Alabaster City Schools =

School district in Alabama

Address
- 10111 Highway 119 Alabaster, Shelby County, AL, 35007; United States

District information
- Type: Public
- Motto: Champions of our Future
- Grades: PK-12
- Established: 2013; 13 years ago
- Superintendent: Dr. Wayne Vickers
- Asst. superintendent(s): Dr. Wesley Hester
- Schools: 5
- Budget: $49.5 million
- NCES District ID: 0100190

Students and staff
- Students: 6,187 ^{('20-'21)}
- Teachers: 354.38 ^{('20-'21)}
- Staff: 350.75 ^{('20-'21)}
- Student–teacher ratio: 17.46 ^{('20-'21)}

Other information
- Website: Official website

The Alabaster City Schools (ACS) is the school district of the Birmingham, Alabama, suburb of Alabaster. Alabaster City School District serves 6,187 students and employs 354 teachers and 351 staff as of the 2020-2021 school year. The district includes two elementary schools, one intermediate school, one middle school, and one high school.

== History ==
In April 2011, the Alabaster City Council commissioned a $32,000 feasibility study of the city forming its own school district by Ira Harvey of Decision Resources. Harvey delivered the study that September, finding that Alabaster was well-positioned to create its own system, but should implement a 1-cent sales tax increase to do so. After a month of discussion amongst the council and with citizens, the city council voted on October 17, 2011 to both create the school board and raise the city sales tax from 3% to 4% to support it.

In January 2012, the city council's education committee began interviewing the 32 applicants for the new Alabaster Board of Education. On March 26, 2012, the first board was sworn in. It consisted of Linda Church, Melanie Shores, John Myrick, Tyrone Quarles, and former city councilor Adam Moseley. Moseley resigned from the city council to take the position, as Alabama state law prohibits one person serving in both bodies at once.

In January 2013, the board hired former Jefferson County Schools superintendent Phil Hammonds as interim superintendent. Hammonds had spent the previous six months as part-time coordinator of administrative services for the group and had retired from his position as Jefferson County superintendent the month before. By that time it had been decided that Alabaster would begin its first school year that fall. State law allowed the board to hire an interim superintendent for six months while it sought someone to fill the position permanently.

On May 1, the board announced it had chosen Saraland superintendent Wayne Vickers as the system's first permanent superintendent. Vickers, one of 16 applicants for the permanent position, had overseen Saraland schools after that city voted to separate from the Mobile County Schools system.

The board also voted in May to have Alabaster officially separate from Shelby County Schools on July 1, 2013. The agreement arranged for out-of-town students currently attending what would become Alabaster schools to be slowly transferred to county schools by 2020. A similar agreement was reached for Alabaster students attending the Linda Nolen Learning Center in Pelham.

The new school system opened to students on August 19, 2013. In celebration of the new system, Thompson High School held its first homecoming parade in 50 years on September 25.

== Schools ==
The Alabaster City School District consists of five schools:

- Creek View Elementary School (PK-3)
- Meadow View Elementary School (PK-3)
- Thompson Intermediate School (4-5)
- Thompson Middle School (6-8)
- Thompson High School (9-12)

== Governance ==
The Alabaster Board of Education currently operates with five members.

- Mr. Adam Moseley (President)
- Mr. Derek Henderson (Vice-President)
- Dr. John Myrick
- Ms. Misty Johnson
- Dr. Kristalyn Lee

Board members are appointed by the Alabaster City Council and are contracted to the school board.

On May 1, 2013, the board approved Dr. Wayne Vickers as the system's first superintendent.
