= Evangel Christian School =

Evangel Christian School may refer to several schools in the United States:

- Evangel Christian School — Lakeland, Florida — see Carpenter's Home Church#Evangel Christian School
- Evangel Christian School (Alabama) — Alabaster, Alabama
- Evangel Christian School (Kentucky) — Louisville, Kentucky
- Evangel Christian School (New York) — Long Island City, New York
- Evangel Christian School (South Carolina) — Charleston, South Carolina
- Evangel Christian School (Colonial Heights, Virginia) — Colonial Heights, Virginia
- Evangel Christian School (Woodbridge, Virginia) — Woodbridge, Virginia
- Evangel Christian Academy — Montgomery, Alabama
- Evangel Christian Academy — Shreveport, Louisiana
- Evangel Christian Academy — Albuquerque, New Mexico
- Evangel Christian Academy — Gahanna, Ohio
- Evangel Baptist Academy — Bucksport, Maine
- Evangel Heights Christian Academy — Sarver, Pennsylvania
- Evangel Temple Christian Academy — Morrow, Georgia
- Evangel Temple Christian School — Grand Prairie, Texas
- Evangel Temple Christian Acada School — Lucedale, Mississippi
