= Jared Smith (defensive end) =

American football player (born 2007)

No. 41 – Auburn Tigers
- Position: Edge rusher
- Class: Sophomore

Personal information
- Born: July 29, 2007 (age 19)
- Listed height: 6 ft 6 in (1.98 m)
- Listed weight: 206 lb (93 kg)

Career information
- High school: Thompson (Alabaster, Alabama)
- College: Auburn (2025–present)
- Stats at ESPN

Jared Smith (born July 29, 2007) is an American football edge rusher for the Auburn Tigers of the Southeastern Conference.

== Early life ==
Smith attended Spain Park High School in Hoover, Alabama, before transferring to Thompson High School in October 2023. As a senior, he recorded 83 tackles, 21 tackles for loss, 10 sacks, and one interception.

== College career ==
=== Auburn ===
Smith committed to Auburn in August 2024. In his second game of the season, against the South Alabama Jaguars, he made two tackles for loss, as well as a sack and a forced fumble. By the end of the season, Smith had a 16.7% edge win rate, the highest on the time.

Smith confirmed that he would return to the program on January 6, 2026, announcing his plans through social media. In that season's spring game, he made an interception off of a screen pass thrown by Byrum Brown. In Smith's first game against the Baylor Bears, he made his first career interception.
