= Jared Smith (disambiguation) =

Jared Smith (born 1990) is an American football player.

Jared Smith may also refer to:

- Jared Smith (defensive end) (born 2007), American football player
- Jared Smith (musician) (fl. from 2016), bassist for Canadian band Archspire
