= Amari Kight =

American football player (born 2000)

No. 78 – Las Vegas Raiders
- Position: Offensive tackle
- Roster status: Practice squad

Personal information
- Born: December 21, 2000 (age 25)
- Listed height: 6 ft 6 in (1.98 m)
- Listed weight: 299 lb (136 kg)

Career information
- High school: Thompson (Alabaster, Alabama)
- College: Alabama (2019–2022); UCF (2023–2024)
- NFL draft: 2025: undrafted

Career history
- Seattle Seahawks (2025); Las Vegas Raiders (2026–present)*
- * Offseason or practice squad member only

Awards and highlights
- Super Bowl champion (LX)

Career NFL statistics as of 2025
- Games played: 4
- Games started: 0
- Stats at Pro Football Reference

Amari Kight (born December 21, 2000) is an American professional football offensive tackle for the Las Vegas Raiders of the National Football League (NFL). He previously played college football for the Alabama Crimson Tide and UCF Knights.

== Early life ==
Kight attended Thompson High School and played football under coach Mark Freeman. Kight was a two-time All-State First Team selection by the Alabama Sports Writers Association as an offensive tackle, helping lead the Warriors to a semifinal appearance in 2017 and a runner-up finish in Class 7A as a senior in 2018. He was selected an Alabama All-Star and was ranked the fourth-best player in Alabama in the Class of 2019 according to ESPN. Rated a four-star recruit, Kight committed to play at Alabama.

== College career ==
Kight redshirted his first season at Alabama. He saw little action in 2020 before playing in seven games in 2021. As a redshirt junior in 2022, Kight appeared in 12 games as a backup to Tyler Steen. Following the season, Kight entered the transfer portal and ultimately committed to UCF. He appeared in all 13 games in 2023 and started 10 games at right tackle. In his final season, Kight helped UCF transfer to the Big 12 Conference and started the majority of games.

== Professional career ==
Pre-draft measurables
Height	Weight	Arm length	Hand span	Wingspan	40-yard dash	10-yard split	20-yard split	20-yard shuttle	Three-cone drill	Vertical jump	Broad jump	Bench press
6 ft 5 3/8 in (1.97 m)	299 lb (136 kg)	33 3/4 in (0.86 m)	9 5/8 in (0.24 m)	6 ft 9 1/8 in (2.06 m)	5.26 s	1.86 s	3.09 s	5.01 s	8.19 s	28.5 in (0.72 m)	9 ft 1 in (2.77 m)	17 reps
All values from Pro Day

=== Seattle Seahawks ===
After not being selected in the 2025 NFL draft, Kight signed with the Seattle Seahawks as an undrafted free agent on May 2. On August 26, 2025, he was released during final roster cuts, but re-signed to the team's practice squad the following day. Heading into the team's Week 4 matchup, Kight was elevated from the practice squad, where he later made his NFL debut in a win over the Arizona Cardinals. He was signed to the active roster on December 30. On February 5, 2026, Kight was placed on season-ending injured reserve due to a knee injury.

On August 30, 2026, Kight was waived/injured by the Seahawks. On September 3, Kight was waived by Seattle with an injury settlement.

=== Las Vegas Raiders ===
On October 19, 2026, Kight was signed to the Las Vegas Raiders practice squad.
