= Pelham City Schools =

School district in Alabama, United States

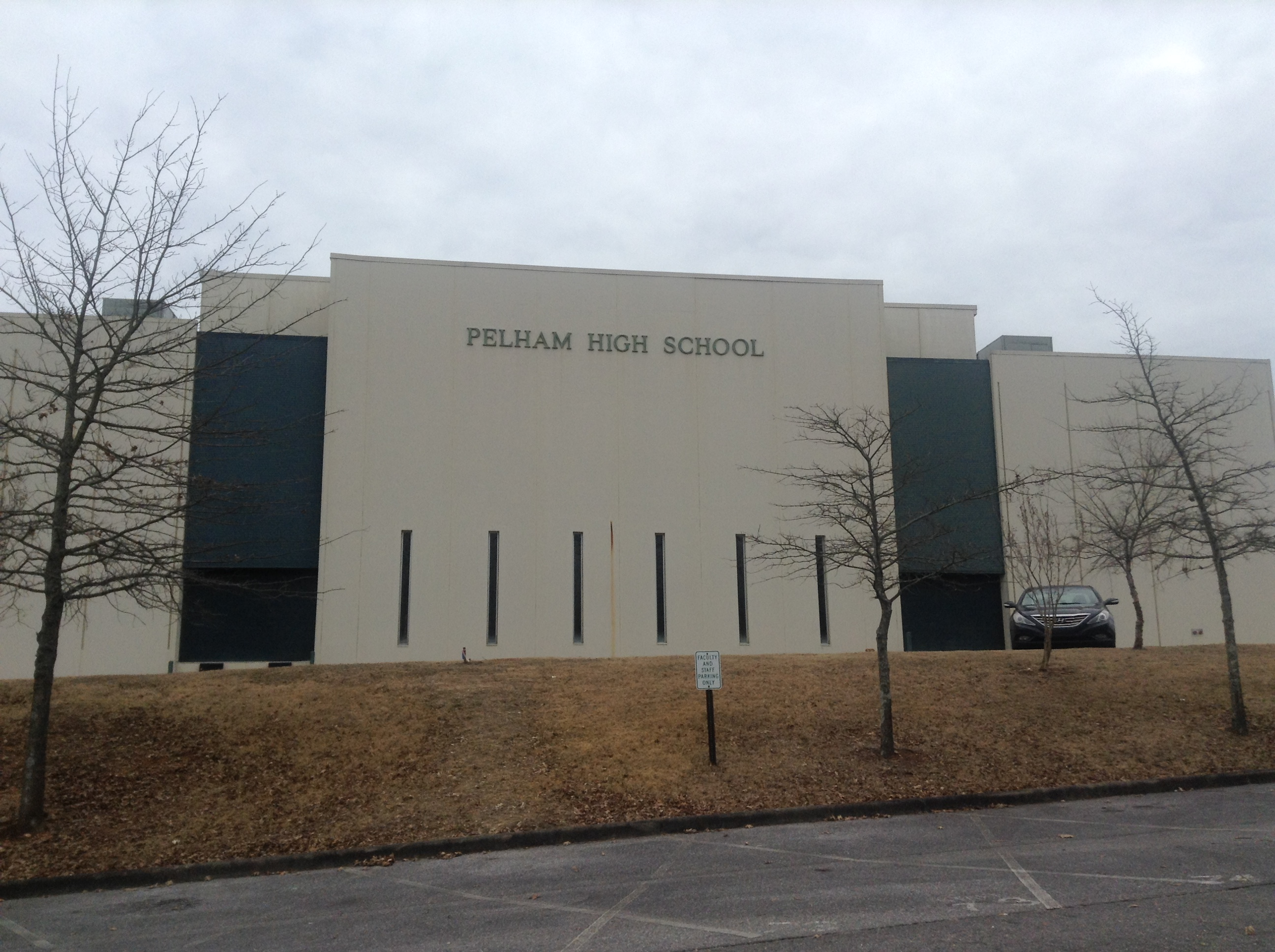
Pelham High School

Pelham City Schools is the school district of Pelham, Alabama.

Pelham had separated from the Shelby County School System on July 1, 2014. Some residents of Pelham living near Chelsea opposed the separation, since their areas were about 13 miles (21 km) to 15 miles (24 km) away from the Pelham schools. The Shelby County officials stated that a separation would require people living in the separated municipality to go to that municipality's schools. A Change.org petition to have those faraway neighborhoods de-annexed from Pelham was established.

== Schools ==
- Pelham High School
- Pelham Park Middle School
- Pelham Ridge Elementary School
- Pelham Oaks Elementary School
