= Helena High School (Alabama) =

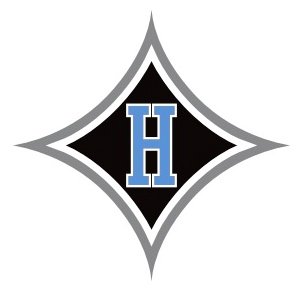

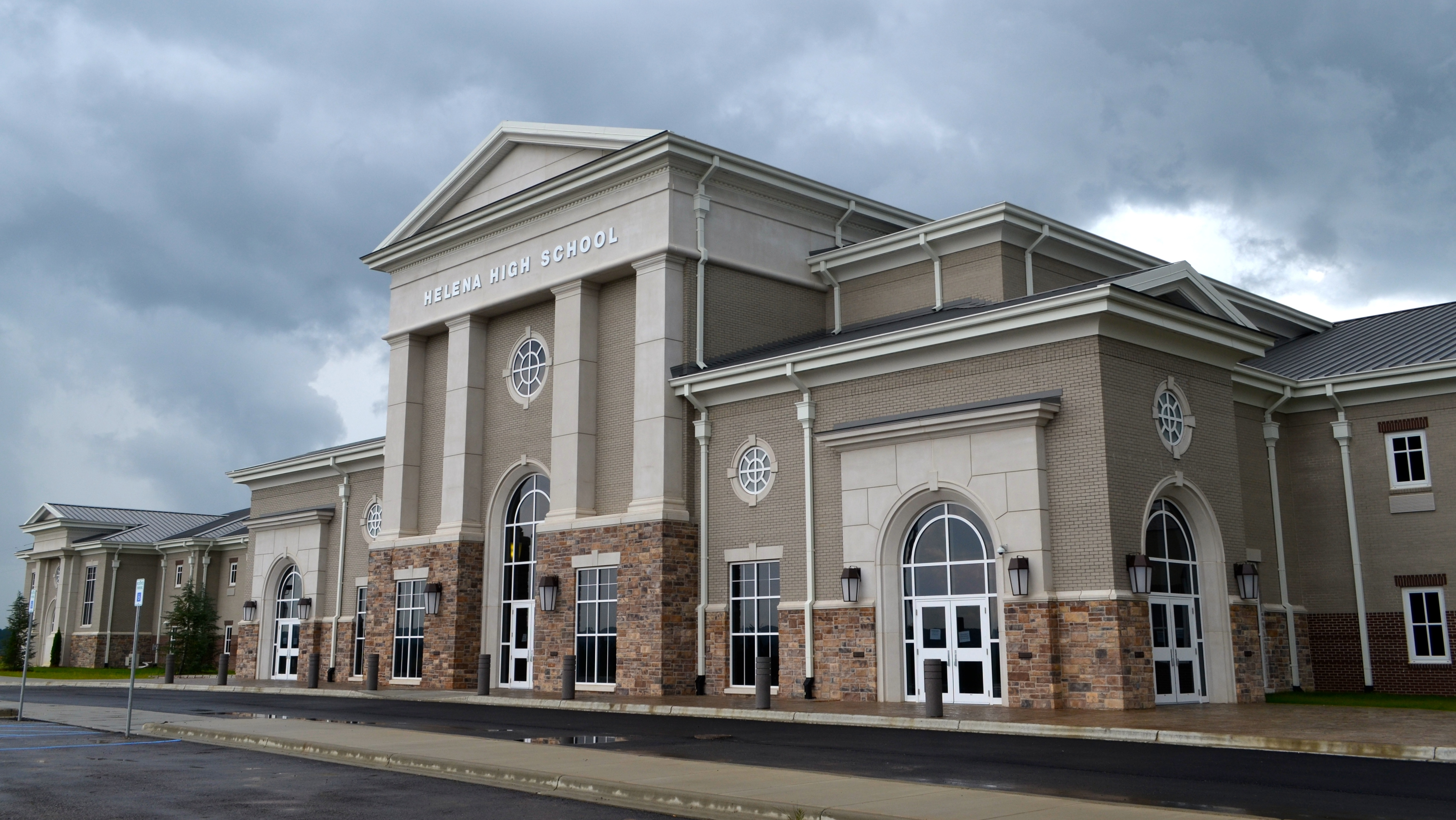
- "Home of the Huskies"

Location
- 1310 Hillsboro Parkway; Helena, Alabama 35080; United States
- 33°16′34″N 86°52′15″W

Information
- Type: Public
- Opened: 2014 (12 years ago)
- School district: Shelby County Schools
- CEEB code: 011438
- Principal: Ashley Bahr
- Teaching staff: 78.00 (FTE)
- Grades: 9–12
- Enrollment: 1,419 (2023-2024)
- Student to teacher ratio: 18.19
- Campus type: Suburban
- Colors: Silver, black, and bright blue
- Athletics conference: AHSAA; Class 6A
- Mascot: Huskies
- Website: www.shelbyed.k12.al.us/o/hhs

Helena High School is a public high school in Helena, Alabama. It opened in August 2014, at the beginning of the 2014–15 school year. For the 2023-2024 school year, Helena High School will be celebrating its 10-year anniversary. This will be a very special year and many exciting events are planned for throughout the school year.

== History ==
Children in grades 9 through 12 that lived in Helena had attended nearby Pelham High School since its opening in 1974, but due to major overcrowding, the Shelby County School System and City of Helena were pressured to invest in opening a new school in Helena. As a result, in September 2010, Helena announced that a high school would be opening within city limits in the next coming years. Early expectations were for the school to open in August 2013, but those expectations were gradually pushed back to a year later.

Students in the classes of 2015 and 2016 (seniors and juniors) who attended Pelham High School in the 2013–14 school year, but who lived in Helena, were given the choice to remain at Pelham High or to transfer to Helena High. Those students were required to submit their decision by December 20, 2013, and those who did not submit a decision were automatically placed in HHS. All sophomores and freshmen for the 2014–15 school year that lived in Helena were required to attend HHS.

On May 16, 2013, former Chelsea High School principal Jay Peoples was named the first principal of the school. A large portion of the school's faculty and staff was hired from Pelham High School.

On January 12, 2014, builders discovered vandalism, including spray-painted walls and released fire extinguishers, scattered throughout the school. Five suspects, all of whom lived in Helena and were set to attend the school, were captured and charged with third degree criminal mischief and third degree burglary by January 16. The damage was estimated to cost around $1,000.

== Information ==
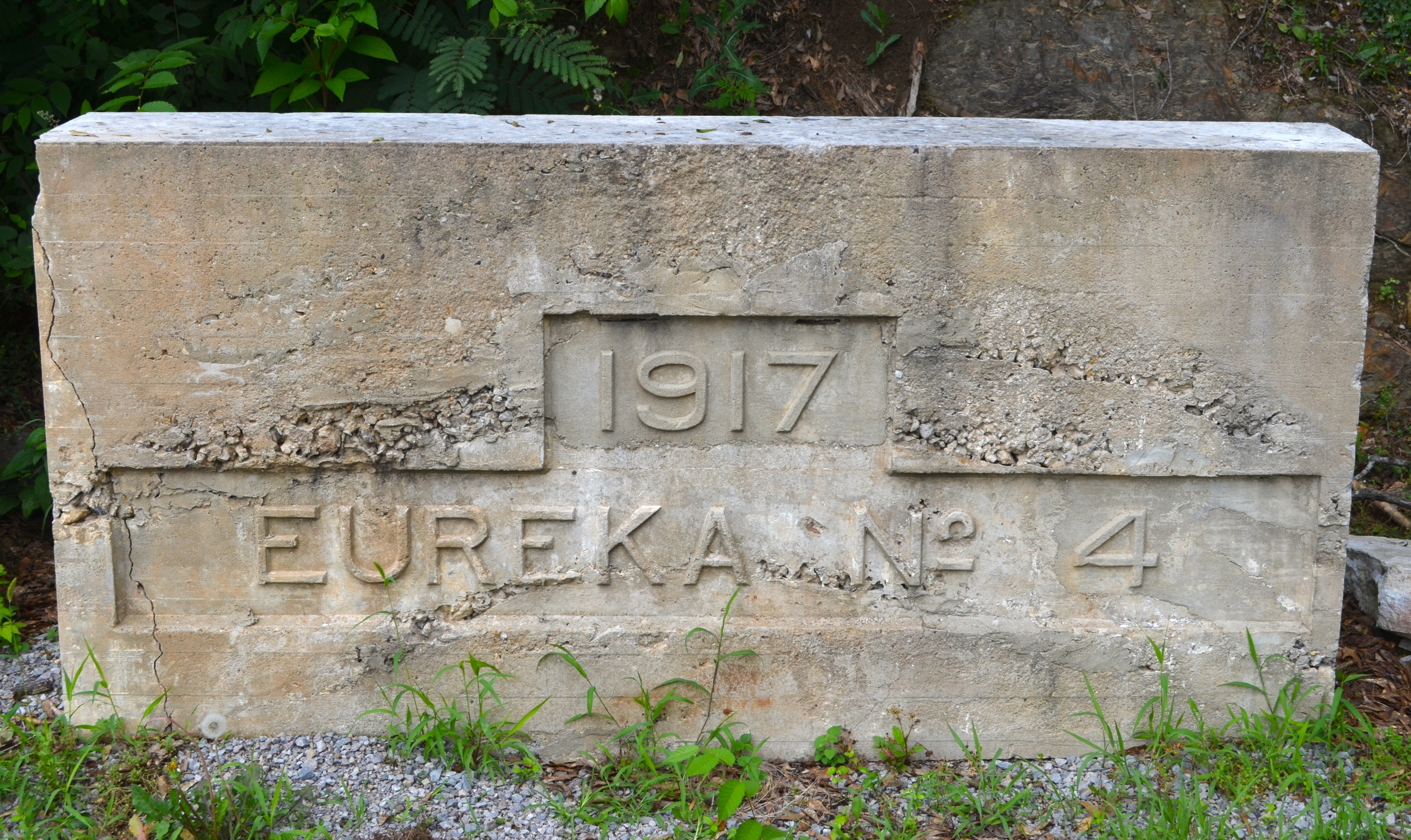
Entrance sign (preserved in Helena's city museum) used by the Eureka No. 4 mine, which existed where HHS stands today.

The school is located on Hillsboro Parkway opposite Helena Middle School in southwestern Helena, near the Hillsboro Trail. The school's colors are silver, black and bright blue, and its nickname is the Huskies, as voted on by students and residents of Helena on November 27, 2012. In addition, the colors and mascots of the other public schools in Helena (Helena Elementary, Helena Intermediate, and Helena Middle) have been changed to concur with those of the high school.

Helena High School was built on the former site of a coal mine that operated in Helena in the early 20th century, and many artifacts found by workers building the school have been preserved in the Kenneth R. Penhale City of Helena Museum, established by its namesake, Ken Penhale, the brother of former Helena mayor of 44 years, Sonny Penhale, and maintained by them and their family.

The school features several modern features, including projectors in classrooms which are interactive and can be used on any wall of the classroom, and a wing of the school which includes classrooms that can double as storm shelters that, combined, can hold all students and staff at the school.
