= Alabaster, Alabama =

City in Alabama, United States

- City
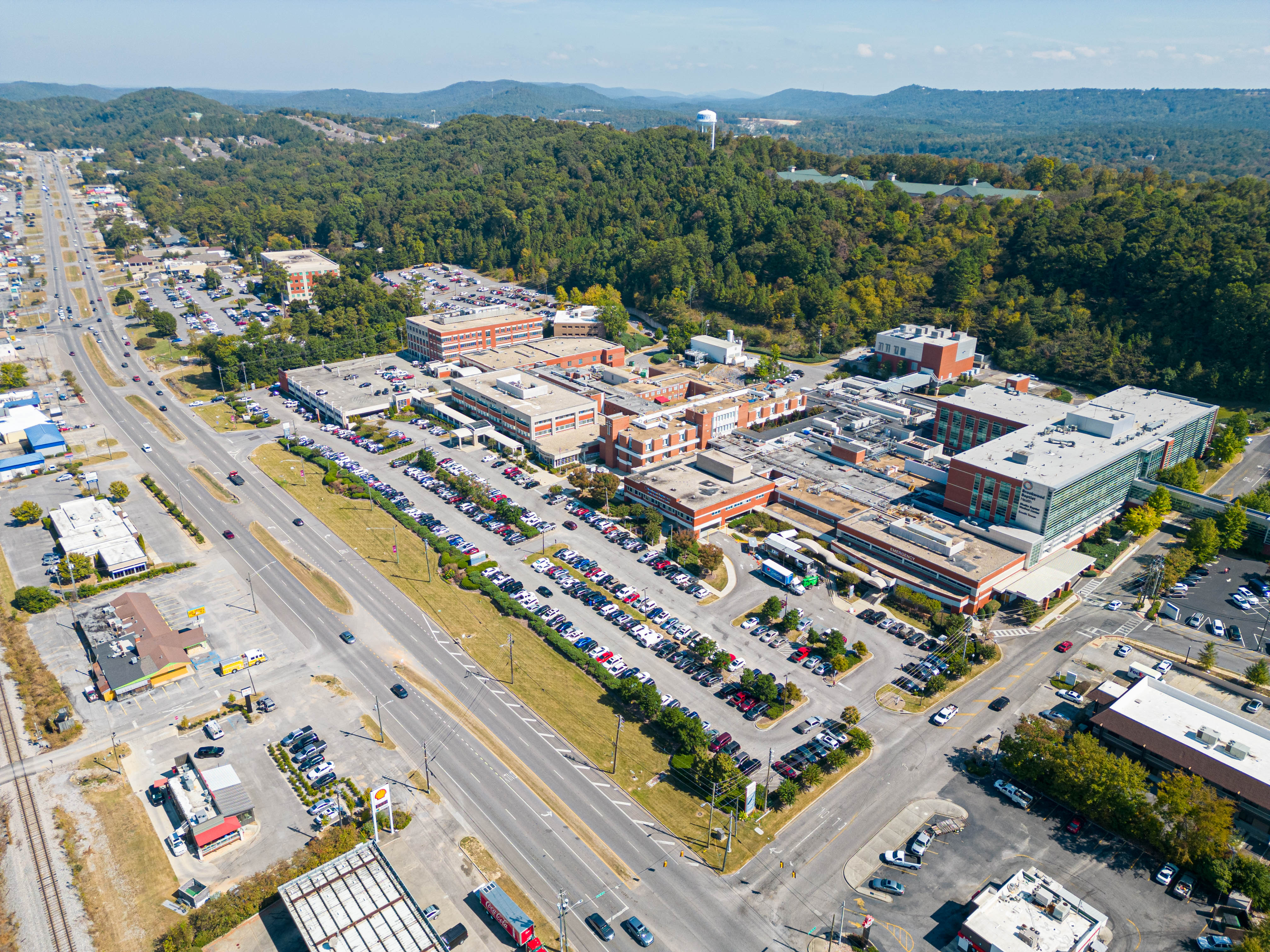
- Aerial view of Highway 31 in Alabaster, AL

- Flag logo

- Location of Alabaster in Shelby County, Alabama.
- Coordinates: 33°14′25″N 86°49′10″W
- Country: United States
- State: Alabama
- County: Shelby
- Established: February 23, 1953

Area
  - Total: 25.59 sq mi (66.29 km^{2})
  - Land: 25.28 sq mi (65.47 km^{2})
  - Water: 0.31 sq mi (0.81 km^{2})
- Elevation: 482 ft (147 m)

Population (2020)
  - Total: 33,284
- Time zone: UTC-6 (Central (CST))
  - Summer (DST): UTC-5 (CDT)
- ZIP code: 35007, 35114
- Area codes: 205, 659
- FIPS code: 01-00820
- GNIS feature ID: 2403069
- Website: Official website

Alabaster is a city and southern suburb of Birmingham in Shelby County, Alabama, United States. At the 2020 census, the population was 33,284. Alabaster is the 16th largest city in Alabama by number of residents.

== History ==
George L. Scott Sr. owned and operated Alabaster Lime Co., which mined alabaster. His shipping point was known as “Scott Rock.” Later, worker housing was built to accommodate some of the mine employees. The community was named Alabaster after the "large body of high-calcium limestone upon which the town is located".

The First Bank of Alabaster opened in 1952, and its president was George L. Scott Jr., who later was elected as the first mayor of Alabaster. The first attempt in 1952 to incorporate Alabaster failed. In January 1953, the petition was again filed, and on February 23, 1953, Alabaster was officially incorporated, with a favorable vote of 79 to 23, and 427 residing inhabitants. In 1955, the Alabaster Water and Gas Board was formed.

In 1971, the city merged with the town community of Siluria, which had incorporated in 1954. The neighboring communities had ties dating back to 1950, when Alabaster was served by the Siluria post office. However, in November 1951, the Alabaster post office opened at the direction of Birmingham Postmaster A.H. Albright.

In 2015, the city announced that it was considering options to expand the area commonly known as the "Main Street Medical Mile" along Highway 31. The plans included an expansion of medical facilities, future civic center, and several retail locations.

Additionally, it was announced in 2017 that a 350,000 square feet retail complex would be built at the corner of Highway 31 and Interstate 65. The new complex, currently named District 31, was slated to open in 2019, however as of 2026, the complex remained under construction.

== Geography ==
Alabaster mostly occupies the Cahaba and Opossum valleys, which are divided by the Pine Ridge that runs north to south. To the east and west, both valleys are flanked by parallel mountain ridges that locally run north to south, but are a part of a larger system of ridges that generally runs north-east to south-west (the tailing ends of the Appalachian foothills). The valleys are drained by small creeks (Buck Creek, Beaverdam Creek) that flow into the Cahaba River.

Access to the city from major highways is found from U.S. Route 31, which runs through the city, and via I-65 exit 238. Downtown Birmingham is 23 mi (37 km) north, and Montgomery is 69 mi (111 km) south, both via US-31 or I-65.

According to the U.S. Census Bureau, the city has a total area of 25.6 square miles (66.3 km^{2}), of which 25.3 square miles (65.5 km^{2}) is land and 0.3 square miles (0.8 km^{2}) (1.2%) is water.

=== Climate ===
According to the Köppen Climate Classification system, Alabaster has a humid subtropical climate, abbreviated "Cfa" on climate maps.

Climate data for Alabaster, Alabama (Shelby County Airport), 1991–2020 normals, extremes 1995–present
Month	Jan	Feb	Mar	Apr	May	Jun	Jul	Aug	Sep	Oct	Nov	Dec	Year
Record high °F (°C)	80 (27)	82 (28)	87 (31)	90 (32)	96 (36)	105 (41)	104 (40)	105 (41)	101 (38)	101 (38)	89 (32)	81 (27)	105 (41)
Mean maximum °F (°C)	72.7 (22.6)	76.1 (24.5)	82.2 (27.9)	86.1 (30.1)	91.6 (33.1)	95.7 (35.4)	96.5 (35.8)	97.1 (36.2)	93.9 (34.4)	88.5 (31.4)	77.9 (25.5)	74.9 (23.8)	98.6 (37.0)
Mean daily maximum °F (°C)	55.7 (13.2)	60.5 (15.8)	67.9 (19.9)	75.4 (24.1)	82.5 (28.1)	88.3 (31.3)	91.1 (32.8)	90.8 (32.7)	86.1 (30.1)	76.3 (24.6)	66.0 (18.9)	58.0 (14.4)	74.9 (23.8)
Daily mean °F (°C)	45.7 (7.6)	49.9 (9.9)	57.0 (13.9)	64.0 (17.8)	71.8 (22.1)	78.5 (25.8)	81.3 (27.4)	80.9 (27.2)	75.8 (24.3)	65.1 (18.4)	54.6 (12.6)	48.2 (9.0)	64.4 (18.0)
Mean daily minimum °F (°C)	35.6 (2.0)	39.3 (4.1)	46.0 (7.8)	52.6 (11.4)	61.0 (16.1)	68.7 (20.4)	71.6 (22.0)	71.0 (21.7)	65.5 (18.6)	53.9 (12.2)	43.1 (6.2)	38.3 (3.5)	53.9 (12.2)
Mean minimum °F (°C)	18.3 (−7.6)	24.2 (−4.3)	29.7 (−1.3)	38.3 (3.5)	47.9 (8.8)	61.3 (16.3)	65.0 (18.3)	64.4 (18.0)	53.5 (11.9)	37.3 (2.9)	26.9 (−2.8)	24.3 (−4.3)	17.2 (−8.2)
Record low °F (°C)	9 (−13)	4 (−16)	14 (−10)	28 (−2)	37 (3)	49 (9)	56 (13)	55 (13)	42 (6)	31 (−1)	21 (−6)	10 (−12)	4 (−16)
Average precipitation inches (mm)	5.35 (136)	5.76 (146)	5.40 (137)	5.07 (129)	4.15 (105)	4.58 (116)	4.93 (125)	4.72 (120)	3.57 (91)	3.03 (77)	4.56 (116)	5.07 (129)	56.19 (1,427)
Average snowfall inches (cm)	0.1 (0.25)	0.2 (0.51)	0.1 (0.25)	0.0 (0.0)	0.0 (0.0)	0.0 (0.0)	0.0 (0.0)	0.0 (0.0)	0.0 (0.0)	0.0 (0.0)	0.0 (0.0)	0.3 (0.76)	0.7 (1.77)
Average precipitation days (≥ 0.01 in)	10.8	11.4	11.5	9.7	9.9	11.5	12.8	11.5	8.0	8.2	9.0	11.3	125.6
Average snowy days (≥ 0.1 in)	0.2	0.2	0.1	0.0	0.0	0.0	0.0	0.0	0.0	0.0	0.0	0.1	0.6
Source 1: NOAA
Source 2: National Weather Service (mean maxima/minima, snow/snow days 2006–2020)

== Demographics ==
=== City of Alabaster (1960-) ===
Alabaster first appeared on the 1960 U.S. Census as an incorporated city.

Historical population
Census	Pop.	Note	%±
1960	1,623		—
1970	2,642		62.8%
1980	7,079		167.9%
1990	14,732		108.1%
2000	22,619		53.5%
2010	30,352		34.2%
2020	33,284		9.7%
2025 (est.)	34,748	▲	4.4%
U.S. Decennial Census

=== Racial and ethnic composition ===
Alabaster city, Alabama – Racial and ethnic composition Note: the US Census treats Hispanic/Latino as an ethnic category. This table excludes Latinos from the racial categories and assigns them to a separate category. Hispanics/Latinos may be of any race.
Race / Ethnicity (NH = Non-Hispanic)	Pop 1980	Pop 1990	Pop 2000	Pop 2010	Pop 2020	% 1980	% 1990	% 2000	% 2010	% 2020
White alone (NH)	5,292	12,957	19,654	22,782	21,791	74.76%	87.95%	86.89%	75.06%	65.47%
Black or African American alone (NH)	1,639	1,617	2,244	4,082	5,300	23.15%	10.98%	9.92%	13.45%	15.92%
Native American or Alaska Native alone (NH)	15	30	70	88	63	0.21%	0.20%	0.31%	0.29%	0.19%
Asian alone (NH)	12	48	144	269	394	0.17%	0.33%	0.64%	0.89%	1.18%
Native Hawaiian or Pacific Islander alone (NH)	x	x	4	8	20	x	x	0.02%	0.03%	0.06%
Other race alone (NH)	0	0	17	66	101	0.00%	0.00%	0.08%	0.22%	0.30%
Mixed race or Multiracial (NH)	x	x	138	334	1,399	x	x	0.61%	1.10%	4.20%
Hispanic or Latino (any race)	121	80	348	2,723	4,216	1.71%	0.54%	1.54%	8.97%	12.67%
Total	7,079	14,732	22,619	30,352	33,284	100.00%	100.00%	100.00%	100.00%	100.00%

=== 2020 census ===
As of the 2020 census, Alabaster had a population of 33,284 and 8,667 families. The median age was 37.7 years. 26.2% of residents were under the age of 18 and 13.7% were 65 years of age or older. For every 100 females there were 93.9 males, and for every 100 females age 18 and over there were 91.6 males age 18 and over.

96.1% of residents lived in urban areas, while 3.9% lived in rural areas.

There were 11,571 households in Alabaster, of which 40.5% had children under the age of 18 living in them. Of all households, 60.5% were married-couple households, 12.5% were households with a male householder and no spouse or partner present, and 22.4% were households with a female householder and no spouse or partner present. About 18.5% of all households were made up of individuals and 7.9% had someone living alone who was 65 years of age or older.

There were 11,990 housing units, of which 3.5% were vacant. The homeowner vacancy rate was 0.8% and the rental vacancy rate was 6.0%.

Racial composition as of the 2020 census
Race	Number	Percent
White	22,323	67.1%
Black or African American	5,356	16.1%
American Indian and Alaska Native	232	0.7%
Asian	396	1.2%
Native Hawaiian and Other Pacific Islander	28	0.1%
Some other race	2,416	7.3%
Two or more races	2,533	7.6%
Hispanic or Latino (of any race)	4,216	12.7%

=== 2010 census ===
As of the census of 2010, there were 30,352 people, 11,016 households, and 6,482 families residing in the city [9]. The population density was 1,104.8 inhabitants per square mile (426.6/km^{2}). The racial makeup of the city was 81.2% White, 15.0% Black or African American, 0.31% Native American, 0.64% Asian, 0.02% Pacific Islander, 2.2% from other races, and 0.69% from two or more races. 4.54% of the population were Hispanic or Latino of any race.

There were 11,016 households, out of which 41.9% had children under the age of 18 living with them, 68.0% were married couples living together, 8.9% had a female householder with no husband present, and 20.6% were non-families. 17.1% of all households were made up of individuals, and 3.6% had someone living alone who was 65 years of age or older. The average household size was 2.73 and the average family size was 3.09.

In the city, the population was spread out, with 27.7% under the age of 18, 7.0% from 18 to 24, 32.0% from 25 to 44, 25.0% from 45 to 64, and 8.0% who were 65 years of age or older. The median age was 35 years. For every 100 females, there were 94.7 males. For every 100 females age 18 and over, there were 90.7 males.

The median income for a household in the city was $64,411, and the median income for a family was $78,940. The per capita income for the city was $22,466. About 4.3% of families and 5.9% of the population were below the poverty line, including 7.0% of those under age 18 and 12.3% of those age 65 or over.

== Alabaster-Helena Census Division (1980-) ==
Historical population
Census	Pop.	Note	%±
1980	33,674		—
1990	59,090		75.5%
2000	86,781		46.9%
2010	118,831		36.9%
U.S. Decennial Census

The Alabaster-Helena Census Division was created in 1980 through the merger of the former Helena Division and Siluria Divisions. It includes portions of Alabaster, Birmingham (Shelby County portion), Brantleyville, Calera, Chelsea, Helena, Hoover, Indian Springs Village, Meadowbrook, Montevallo, Pelham and Vestavia Hills.

== Government ==
The government consists of a mayor, who is elected at-large, and a seven-member city council. Each member is elected from a single-member district, called a ward, of roughly equal population.

The Mayor and City Council are elected every four years. The most recent election was held in 2020.

The current City Council Members are: Sophie Martin, Rick Ellis, Stacy Rakestraw, Greg Farrell, Jamie Cole, Zach Zahariadis, and Kerri Pate.

Alabaster Fire Department ISO Class 2 rated. Consisting of 3 Firehouses with 61 Full Time Firefighters.

Alabaster Firehouse #1 Located at 890 1st Avenue West.

Alabaster Firehouse #2 Located at 950 Butler Road.

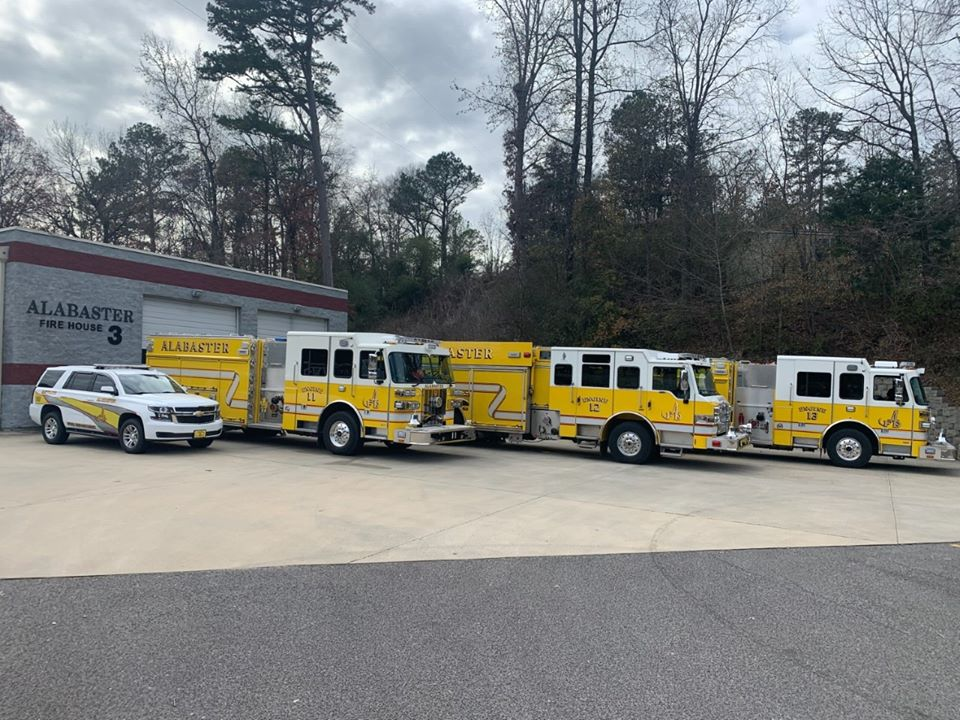
Alabaster Firehouse #3 located at 910 1st Street South (US 31 South)

=== City Council ===
District	Name	Position
1	Mrs. Sophie Martin	President
2	Mr. Rick Ellis	Councilperson
3	Mrs. Stacy Rakestraw	Councilperson
4	Mr. Greg Farrell	President Pro-Temp
5	Mr. Jamie Cole	Councilperson
6	Zach Zahariadis	Councilperson
7	Ms. Kerri Bell-Pate	Councilperson

== Schools ==
On July 1, 2013, the Alabaster City Schools System officially separated from the Shelby County Schools system, and now operates the public schools in the city. Private school K-12 education is also available.

- Creek View Elementary School
- Meadow View Elementary School
- Thompson Intermediate School
- Thompson Middle School
- Thompson High School

Private:

- Evangel Christian School
- Kingwood Christian School (closed)

== Transportation ==
ClasTran provides dial-a-ride transit service on weekdays in Alabaster.

== Notable people ==
- John Archibald, newspaper reporter and columnist
- Drew Avans, baseball player
- Noah Galloway, U.S. Army soldier and motivational speaker
- Joey Gattina, stock car racing driver
- James Hall, sports shooter
- Conner Harrell, football player
- Wendy Holcombe, banjo player and singer
- Brandon King, football player
- Tua Tagovailoa, football player
- Vallejo, rock band
- April Weaver, politician and nurse
