= Willie Kirkland =

American baseball player (born 1934)

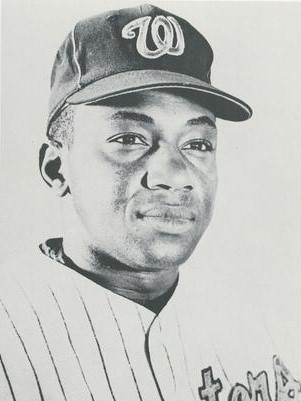
- Right fielder
- Born: February 17, 1934 (age 92); Siluria, Alabama, U.S.
- Batted: Left Threw: Right

Professional debut
- MLB: April 15, 1958, for the San Francisco Giants
- NPB: 1968, for the Hanshin Tigers

Last appearance
- MLB: September 26, 1966, for the Washington Senators
- NPB: 1973, for the Hanshin Tigers

MLB statistics
- Batting average: .240
- Home runs: 148
- Runs batted in: 509

NPB statistics
- Batting average: .246
- Home runs: 126
- Runs batted in: 304
- Stats at Baseball Reference

Teams
- San Francisco Giants (1958–1960); Cleveland Indians (1961–1963); Baltimore Orioles (1964); Washington Senators (1964–1966); Hanshin Tigers (1968–1973)

Willie Charles Kirkland (born February 17, 1934) is an American former professional baseball player. A right fielder and a powerful left-handed hitter, Kirkland appeared in 1,149 games in Major League Baseball over nine seasons for the San Francisco Giants (1958–1960), Cleveland Indians (1961–1963), Baltimore Orioles (1964) and Washington Senators (1964–1966). He also spent six seasons in Nippon Professional Baseball as a member of the Hanshin Tigers during his 20-year pro career. Born in Siluria, Alabama, he grew up in Detroit.

== Baseball career ==
Kirkland signed with the New York Giants in 1952 upon his graduation from Detroit's Northwestern High School. He threw right-handed, stood 6 feet 1 inch (1.85 m) tall and weighed 206 pounds (93 kg). A prodigious minor-league slugger, he rose through the organization over his first four seasons, three times exceeding the 35-home run mark, and winning a batting title and runs batted in championship on the way. Kirkland then spent all of 1957 in the military.

When Kirkland mustered out of the service in 1958, he became a member of the MLB Giants during their first season in San Francisco. He won the regular right field job and appeared in the team's first-ever official game on the West Coast: an 8–0 thrashing of the Los Angeles Dodgers at Seals Stadium on April 15. Batting cleanup, behind Willie Mays, the 24-year-old rookie collected a single and an RBI in five at bats. Kirkland was part of a flood of young players who joined the Giants during their maiden years in San Francisco (others included Felipe Alou, Orlando Cepeda, Jim Davenport, Juan Marichal, Willie McCovey and Leon Wagner), and he went on to hold the Giants' regular right-field job for three seasons, through 1960, belting 57 home runs and hitting .261.

But after the 1960 season, the Giants traded Kirkland to the Cleveland Indians with veteran pitcher Johnny Antonelli for outfielder Harvey Kuenn. Kirkland took over as the Indians' starting right-fielder in 1961, and led the team in homers (27) and runs batted in (95), hitting .259. But while Kirkland hit 21 homers for the 1962 Indians tied for second on the club, his batting average plummeted to .200. Then, in 1963, Kirkland shuttled between center field and right field, hitting only 15 homers while batting .230. He was traded to the Orioles during the off-season, where he batted .200 in 66 games and was sold to the second-division Senators in August. Kirkland spent the rest of his major-league career with Washington as a backup outfielder before he was assigned outright to the Triple-A Hawaii Islanders of the Pacific Coast League. Over his nine MLB seasons, Kirkland posted a .240 batting average with 148 home runs and 509 RBI. His 837 hits also included 134 doubles and 29 triples.

Kirkland's year in Hawaii began the last chapter of his pro career. He smashed 34 home runs for the 1967 Islanders, then began his career in Japanese baseball the following season. In his first season for Hanshin, Kirkland hit 37 homers and then 26 the following year. All told, he hit 126 long balls during his career in Japan.

== Best seasons ==
- 1960: Collected double digits in doubles (21), triples (10), home runs (21) and stolen bases (12)
- 1961: Hit 27 home runs with 136 hits and 95 RBI in 146 games (all career-highs) with a three-homer game on July 9 against the Chicago White Sox; all came off right-hander Cal McLish. Kirkland came up in the ninth with the game on the line and Cleveland manager Jimmy Dykes ordered him to bunt, which he successfully did.
