= Pelham, Alabama =

City in Alabama, United States

- City
- Flag Seal Logo

- Location of Pelham in Shelby County, Alabama
- Coordinates: 33°18′36″N 86°45′15″W
- Country: United States
- State: Alabama
- County: Shelby
- Incorporated: July 10, 1964

Area
  - Total: 39.243 sq mi (101.639 km^{2})
  - Land: 38.738 sq mi (100.330 km^{2})
  - Water: 0.506 sq mi (1.311 km^{2})
- Elevation: 830 ft (250 m)

Population (2020)
  - Total: 24,318
  - Estimate (2022): 24,755
  - Density: 639/sq mi (246.7/km^{2})
- Time zone: UTC−6 (Central (CST))
  - Summer (DST): UTC−5 (CDT)
- ZIP Code: 35124
- Area codes: 205 and 659
- FIPS code: 01-58848
- GNIS feature ID: 2404497
- Website: pelhamalabama.gov

Pelham is a city in Shelby County, Alabama, United States. The population was 24,318 at the 2020 census. It incorporated on July 10, 1964, and is a suburb located in the Birmingham metropolitan area, Alabama which was home to nearly 1.2 million residents as of the 2020 census. It was named for Confederate Civil War officer John Pelham.

== Geography ==
According to the United States Census Bureau, the city has a total area of 39.243 square miles (101.64 km^{2}), of which 38.737 square miles (100.33 km^{2}) is land and 0.506 square miles (1.31 km^{2}) is water.

Oak Mountain State Park, Alabama's largest state park, is located in Pelham.

The city is located along U.S. Route 31, which runs directly through the city, as well as I-65, with access from exits 242 and 246. Downtown Birmingham is 20 mi (32 km) north, and Montgomery is 72 mi (116 km) south, both via US-31 or I-65.

== Demographics ==
Historical population
| Census | Pop. | Note | %± |
|---|---|---|---|
| 1970 | 931 | | — |
| 1980 | 6,759 | | 626.0% |
| 1990 | 9,765 | | 44.5% |
| 2000 | 14,369 | | 47.1% |
| 2010 | 21,352 | | 48.6% |
| 2020 | 24,318 | | 13.9% |
| 2025 (est.) | 25,664 | ▲ | 5.5% |
U.S. Decennial Census; 2020 Census

=== Racial and ethnic composition ===
Pelham city, Alabama – Racial and ethnic composition Note: the US Census treats Hispanic/Latino as an ethnic category. This table excludes Latinos from the racial categories and assigns them to a separate category. Hispanics/Latinos may be of any race.
| Race / Ethnicity (NH = Non-Hispanic) | Pop 2000 | Pop 2010 | Pop 2020 | % 2000 | % 2010 | % 2020 |
|---|---|---|---|---|---|---|
| White alone (NH) | 12,473 | 15,776 | 15,982 | 86.80% | 73.89% | 65.72% |
| Black or African American alone (NH) | 570 | 1,579 | 3,103 | 3.97% | 7.40% | 12.76% |
| Native American or Alaska Native alone (NH) | 40 | 49 | 34 | 0.28% | 0.23% | 0.14% |
| Asian alone (NH) | 240 | 509 | 594 | 1.67% | 2.38% | 2.44% |
| Native Hawaiian or Pacific Islander alone (NH) | 0 | 13 | 17 | 0.00% | 0.06% | 0.07% |
| Other race alone (NH) | 2 | 29 | 107 | 0.01% | 0.14% | 0.44% |
| Mixed race or Multiracial (NH) | 121 | 223 | 832 | 0.84% | 1.04% | 3.42% |
| Hispanic or Latino (any race) | 923 | 3,174 | 3,649 | 6.42% | 14.87% | 15.01% |
| Total | 14,369 | 21,352 | 24,318 | 100.00% | 100.00% | 100.00% |

=== 2020 census ===
As of the 2020 census, there were 24,318 people, 9,489 households, and 6,681 families residing in the city. The population density was 626.4 inhabitants per square mile (241.9/km^{2}). The median age was 39.4 years. 22.9% of residents were under the age of 18 and 15.1% were 65 years of age or older. For every 100 females there were 91.6 males, and for every 100 females age 18 and over there were 88.8 males age 18 and over.

Of the 9,489 households, 33.1% had children under the age of 18 living in them. 54.9% were married-couple households, 14.4% had a male householder with no spouse or partner present, and 26.0% had a female householder with no spouse or partner present. About 25.0% of all households were made up of individuals, and 9.5% had someone living alone who was 65 years of age or older.

There were 9,777 housing units, of which 2.9% were vacant. The homeowner vacancy rate was 0.7% and the rental vacancy rate was 5.1%.

87.1% of residents lived in urban areas, while 12.9% lived in rural areas.

Racial composition as of the 2020 census
| Race | Number | Percent |
|---|---|---|
| White | 16,351 | 67.2% |
| Black or African American | 3,121 | 12.8% |
| American Indian and Alaska Native | 234 | 1.0% |
| Asian | 600 | 2.5% |
| Native Hawaiian and Other Pacific Islander | 18 | 0.1% |
| Some other race | 2,321 | 9.5% |
| Two or more races | 1,673 | 6.9% |
| Hispanic or Latino (of any race) | 3,649 | 15.0% |

=== 2010 census ===
As of the 2010 census, there were 21,352 people, 8,149 households, and 5,764 families living in the city. The population density was 547.2 inhabitants per square mile (211.3/km^{2}). There were 8,541 housing units at an average density of 224.8 per square mile (86.8/km^{2}). The racial makeup of the city was 81.2% White, 7.5% Black or African American, 0.3% Native American, 2.4% Asian, 6.9% from other races, and 1.6% from two or more races. 14.9% of the population were Hispanic or Latino of any race.

Of the 8,149 households 34.7% had children under the age of 18 living with them, 58.4% were married couples living together, 8.7% had a female householder with no husband present, and 29.3% were non-families. 24.1% of households were one person and 6.2% were one person aged 65 or older. The average household size was 2.62 and the average family size was 3.14.

The age distribution was 26.0% under the age of 18, 6.8% from 18 to 24, 32.9% from 25 to 44, 24.9% from 45 to 64, and 9.4% 65 or older. The median age was 35.3 years. For every 100 females, there were 95.0 males. For every 100 females age 18 and over, there were 96.8 males.

The median household income was $67,622 and the median family income was $80,690. Males had a median income of $56,277 versus $42,269 for females. The per capita income for the city was $30,467. About 3.8% of families and 6.5% of the population were below the poverty line, including 9.1% of those under age 18 and 1.7% of those age 65 or over.

=== 2000 census ===
As of the 2000 census, there were 14,369 people, 5,637 households, and 4,002 families living in the city. The population density was 378.2 inhabitants per square mile (146.0/km^{2}). There were 5,894 housing units at an average density of 155.1 per square mile (59.9/km^{2}). The racial makeup of the city was 90.02% White, 3.97% Black or African American, 0.35% Native American, 1.68% Asian, 2.82% from other races, and 1.16% from two or more races. 6.42% of the population were Hispanic or Latino of any race.

Of the 5,637 households 35.5% had children under the age of 18 living with them, 59.3% were married couples living together, 8.9% had a female householder with no husband present, and 29.0% were non-families. 25.3% of households were one person and 5.8% were one person aged 65 or older. The average household size was 2.54 and the average family size was 3.05.

The age distribution was 25.6% under the age of 18, 7.4% from 18 to 24, 35.7% from 25 to 44, 22.7% from 45 to 64, and 8.6% 65 or older. The median age was 35 years. For every 100 females, there were 94.8 males. For every 100 females age 18 and over, there were 91.6 males.

The median household income was $54,808 and the median family income was $79,794. Males had a median income of $42,659 versus $32,382 for females. The per capita income for the city was $25,611. About 3.4% of families and 4.6% of the population were below the poverty line, including 5.7% of those under age 18 and 2.4% of those age 65 or over.

== City government ==
The City of Pelham operates under the Mayor/Council Act. The mayor serves as the city's chief executive and the City Council act much like a board of directors. The city also has a chief of police, fire chief, finance director / city clerk, building inspector, permits clerk, revenue director, director of golf, parks manager, waterworks superintendent, librarian, and departments thereof.

=== Mayors of Pelham, 1964–present ===
| Name | Party | Term | Occupation |
| Paul Yeager Sr | Democratic | 1964–1972 | Farmer |
| Burk Dunnaway | Democratic | 1972–1984 | Junk Dealer |
| Bobby Hayes | Republican | 1984–2008 | Police Officer |
| Don Murphy | Republican | 2008–2012 | Real Estate Broker |
| Gary Waters | Republican | 2012–2026 | Fire Chief |
| Rick Wash | Republican | 2026–present | Manager |

== Education ==
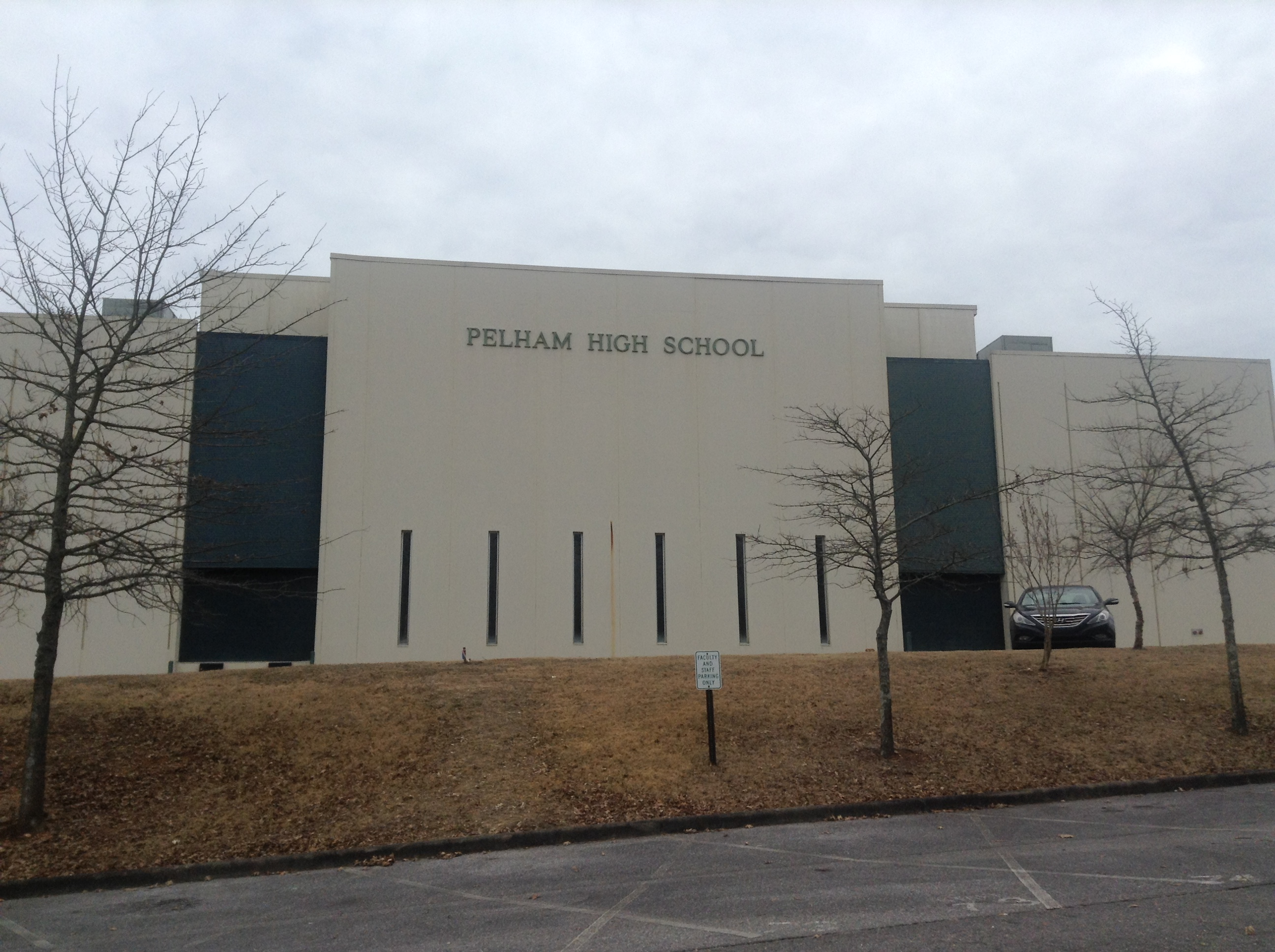
Pelham High School

Pelham City Schools operates public schools and has done so since it was established on July 1, 2014. It operates Pelham High School.

Previously it was in the Shelby County School System. Prior to 2014 some portions of Pelham bordering Chelsea attended public schools in Chelsea; residents there were concerned about the separation of Pelham due to the distance of schools in Pelham from their areas.

== Transportation ==
ClasTran provides dial-a-ride transit service on weekdays in Pelham.

== Notable people ==
- John Green, American author and YouTube personality
- Brent Hinds, singer/guitarist for the metal band Mastodon
- David Koonce, bass guitarist for the rock band Within Reason
- Antonio London, former professional American football player in the National Football League
- Dabo Swinney, head coach for the Clemson University football team
- Tina Watson, alleged murder victim killed while scuba diving in Queensland, Australia
