= Kingwood Christian School =

School in Alabaster, Alabama, United States

Kingwood Christian School (KCS) was a private Christian school in Alabaster, Alabama, in the Birmingham, Alabama metropolitan area. It had grades K-12.

== History ==
First Assembly of God, a church, created the school in 1979. The church later changed its name to Kingwood Church.

By 2018 the institution spent $12,000 for safety measures including panic button necklaces on teachers, in-classroom cameras, a "school resource officer", and other extra security cameras.

In spring 2019 the 12th grade class had 35 students, and enrollment was 300 total. According to the headmaster, Ruth Gray, the enrollment decline was due to the school having to compete with other schools which did not exist when the school was first established, as well as an increase in homeschooling. According to Gray, the school had so few students that it could no longer optimally function. Therefore it closed operations that spring. Some area Christian schools which had previously decided not to take new applicants allowed former students of KCS to submit applications, and other former students entered public school systems.

The church itself remained open and did not shutter its Kingwood Christian Child Development Center.
