= Thomas Rayam =

American football player (born 1968)

No. 61, 55, 53, 58
- Positions: Guard, defensive tackle

Personal information
- Born: January 3, 1968 (age 58); Orlando, Florida, U.S.
- Listed height: 6 ft 7 in (2.01 m)
- Listed weight: 297 lb (135 kg)

Career information
- High school: Jones (Orlando)
- College: Alabama
- NFL draft: 1990: 10th round, 270th overall pick

Career history
- Washington Redskins (1990–1991)*; Cincinnati Bengals (1992–1993); Birmingham Barracudas (1995); Edmonton Eskimos (1996–1998); Miami Dolphins (1999)*; Calgary Stampeders (1999–2001); Toronto Argonauts (2002)
- * Offseason or practice squad member only

Awards and highlights
- Super Bowl champion (XXVI); Grey Cup champion (2001); CFL West All-Star (1997)

Career NFL statistics
- Games played: 20
- Games started: 13
- Fumble recoveries: 2
- Stats at Pro Football Reference

Career CFL statistics
- Games played: 126

Thomas Leon Rayam (born January 3, 1968) is an American former professional football player who was an offensive lineman in the National Football League (NFL) and Canadian Football League (CFL). He is a Grey Cup champion after winning with the Calgary Stampeders in 2001 and was named a CFL West All-Star in 1997.

== College career ==
Rayam played college football for the Alabama Crimson Tide, and is remembered for blocking Penn State's last-second field-goal attempt in a 17–16 Alabama win in 1989.

== Professional career ==
Rayam was selected by the Washington Redskins in the tenth round of the 1990 NFL draft. He played in 20 games in the NFL with the Cincinnati Bengals and played in 126 games in the CFL with the Birmingham Barracudas, Edmonton Eskimos, Calgary Stampeders, and Toronto Argonauts.

== Personal life ==
Rayam's older brother, Hardy Rayam, played for the Notre Dame Fighting Irish under coach Dan Devine. Rayam's son, T.J. Rayam, played in the CFL for the Stampeders and his younger son, Jalen Rayam, plays for the Toronto Argonauts.
