= T. J. Rayam =

American gridiron football player (born 1997)

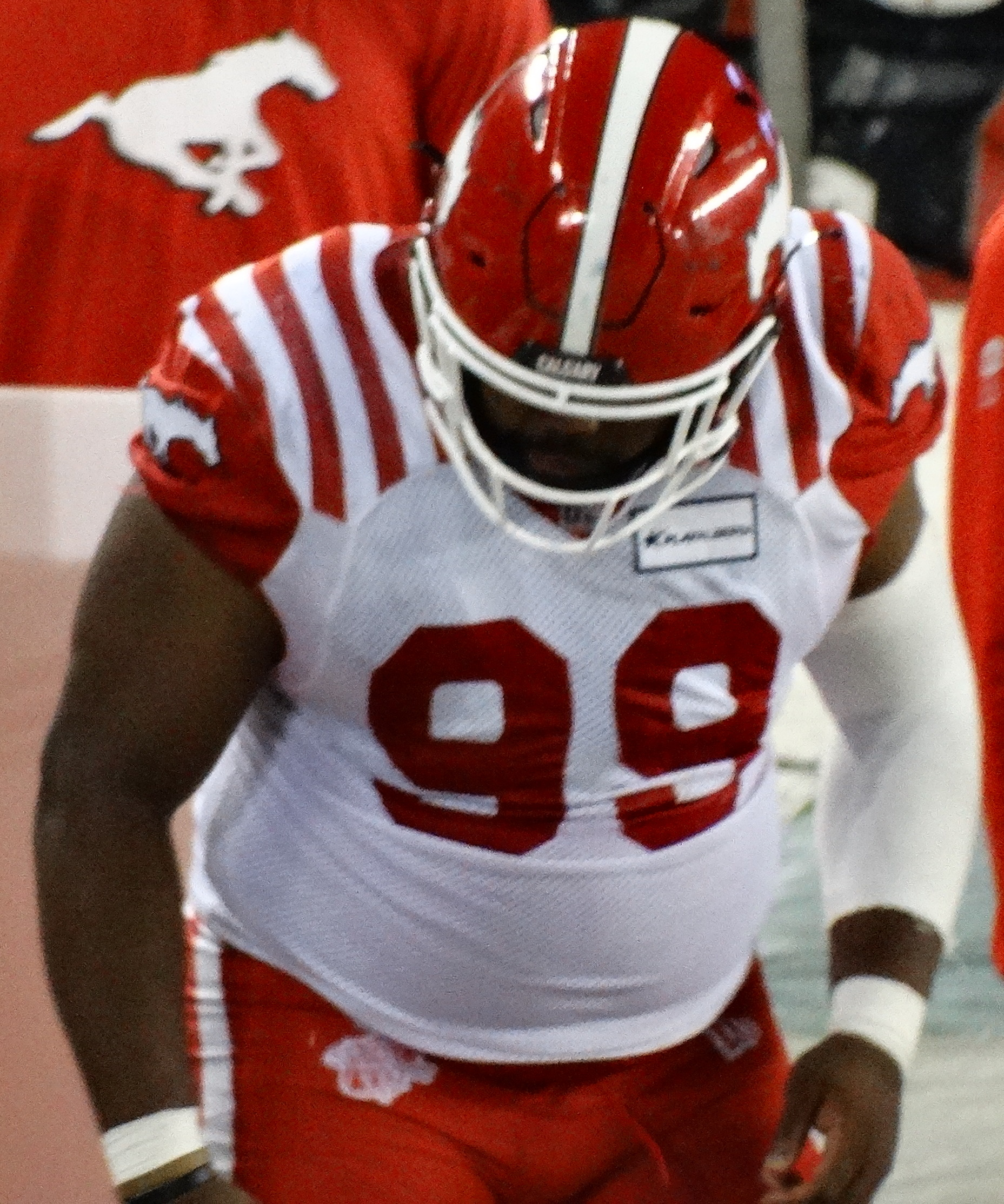
- Rayam with the Calgary Stampeders in 2023

No. 99
- Position: Defensive lineman

Personal information
- Born: September 12, 1997 (age 29); Edmonton, Alberta, Canada
- Listed height: 6 ft 0 in (1.83 m)
- Listed weight: 291 lb (132 kg)

Career information
- High school: Peddie (Hightstown, New Jersey, U.S.)
- College: Boston College
- NFL draft: 2022: undrafted

Career history
- 2022–2023: Calgary Stampeders
- 2024: Ottawa Redblacks*
- * Offseason or practice squad member only
- Stats at CFL.ca

Thomas Leon Rayam Jr. (born September 12, 1997) is a Canadian-American former professional football defensive lineman who played for the Calgary Stampeders of the Canadian Football League (CFL). He played college football for the Boston College Eagles.

== Early life ==
Thomas Leon Rayam Jr. was born on September 12, 1997, in Edmonton, Alberta, Canada, the son of former NFL and CFL player Thomas Rayam. He later played high school football at Thompson High School in Alabaster, Alabama. He also won the 2015 Class 7A heavyweight state championship in wrestling. After his senior season, Rayam spent one year playing football at the Peddie School in Hightstown, New Jersey.

== College career ==
Rayam played college football at Boston College from 2017 to 2021 as a defensive tackle. He played in seven games in 2017 and made one tackle. He appeared in nine games in 2018, recording eight tackles. Rayam played in 13 games, starting 12, in 2019, totaling 41 tackles and two pass breakups. He appeared in 11 games, starting six, in 2020, accumulating 16 tackles. He played in 12 games in 2021, recording 35 tackles and two sacks.

== Professional career ==
Rayam was selected by the Calgary Stampeders of the Canadian Football League (CFL) in the 2022 CFL Supplemental Draft. He signed with the team on May 14, 2022. He spent a portion of the 2022 season on injured reserve. Overall, he dressed in 10 games in 2022, recording 10 tackles on defense and two sacks. Rayam spent time on injured reserve again during the 2023 season. He dressed for 11 games in 2023, totaling 10 tackles on defense and one sack. He was released during training camp of the following season on May 15, 2024.

On June 6, 2024, it was announced that Rayam had signed with the Ottawa Redblacks. However, he was released just ten days later on June 16, 2024.
