= Siluria, Alabama =

- Unincorporated community
- Location within Alabama Location within the United States
- Coordinates: 33°13′45″N 86°49′30″W
- Country: United States
- State: Alabama
- County: Shelby
- Elevation: 492 ft (150 m)
- Time zone: UTC-6 (Central (CST))
  - Summer (DST): UTC-5 (CDT)
- ZIP code: 35144
- Area codes: 205, 659
- GNIS feature ID: 126847

Siluria is a former town and now a neighborhood in Alabaster, Alabama, United States, located in Shelby County in the Birmingham, Alabama, metropolitan area. It was the home of a large cotton mill and company-built mill village which began operations in 1896 and finally closed in 1979. It was incorporated on May 25, 1954, but was later annexed by Alabaster in May 1971. It is named for the Silurian geological period because of rocks found there. A post office was established in 1872, and remained in operation until it was discontinued in 1972.

== Demographics ==
Historical population
| Census | Pop. | Note | %± |
|---|---|---|---|
| 1960 | 736 | | — |
| 1970 | 678 | | −7.9% |
U.S. Decennial Census

== Notable people ==
- Jim Davenport, born in Siluria, major league baseball player
- Willie Kirkland, born in Siluria, major league baseball player
- Cathy O'Donnell, born Ann Steely in Siluria, actress, on July 6, 1923
