= Chelsea High School (Alabama) =

Coordinates: 33°20′02″N 86°40′50″W

Location
- 10510 Hwy 11; Chelsea, Alabama 35043; United States

Information
- Type: Public
- Motto: It's a great day to be a Hornet!
- Established: 1879 (147 years ago)
- School district: Shelby County School District
- CEEB code: 010648
- Principal: Brandon Turner
- Teaching staff: 76.00 (FTE)
- Grades: 9-12
- Enrollment: 1,291 (2023-2024)
- Student to teacher ratio: 16.99
- Colors: Royal blue and white
- Athletics: Baseball, basketball, cheerleading, volleyball, football, golf, soccer, softball, cross country, track and field, wrestling, mountain biking, swim, fishing, and tennis
- Nickname: Fighting Hornets
- Rivals: Briarwood Christian School, Oak Mountain High School
- Website: www.shelbyed.k12.al.us/o/chhs

Chelsea High School is a public institution located in Chelsea, Alabama, United States. It is in the Shelby County School system.

== Athletics ==
- Chelsea's Girls Cross Country Team won the first ever state championship in school history in 2022. The team of ten girls made up of 8th-12th graders fought their way from being ranked as 21st in 7A to taking the state champion title from the 5 time defending champion by 33 points. The cross country and track teams consist of several nationally ranked runners and state record holders.
- Chelsea High School fields a football program, which had two back-to-back Region 5 Championships in 4A and 5A during the 2005 and 2006 campaigns.
- The Hornets Basketball team won their area and made it to the state Sweet 16 for 6A in 2015 and 2016.
- The Fighting Hornets Baseball team has also been successful in recent years, clinching back-to-back area titles in 2007 and 2008.
- The Lady Hornets dominated most sports in 2008, winning their areas in basketball, softball, and soccer.
- The soccer teams at Chelsea High School are usually two of the best athletics teams in the school. They both won their areas in 2011 and 2012. Both teams made deep runs in the state tournament, with the girls' team finishing runners-up in 2011.
- The Lady Hornets Soccer team won the 5A State Tournament in 2012 and the boys made it into the play-offs.
- The Lady Hornets Soccer team won the 6A State Tournament in 2017.
- The Lady Hornets Softball team won the 5A State Tournament in 2012.
- The Lady Hornets Softball team won the 6A state tournament in 2016.

== Media ==
- The band Fracture, consisting of students at Chelsea High School, appeared on ABC 33/40 during the Original Artist competition.
- The Lady Hornets Soccer team were covered by the Shelby County Reporter, ABC 33/40, and the front page of the Birmingham newspaper for winning the state tournament in 2012.
