= Evangel Classical Christian School =

Location
- 423 Thompson Rd; Alabaster, Alabama 35007; United States; 33°14′17″N 86°50′9″W

Information
- Established: 2004
- CEEB code: 010028
- Head of school: David Maginnis
- Enrollment: 319 (2021-22)
- Website: www.evangelclassical.com

Evangel Classical Christian School is a state-registered, private, K–12 Christian school in Alabaster, Alabama. It was founded in 2000 in order to provide classical Christian education.

Evangel Christian School operates under the legal and spiritual oversight of the Presbyterian Evangel Church, Presbyterian Church in America (PCA), as a board-directed ministry. It is accredited by the Association of Classical and Christian Schools.

It partners with Evangel Christian School, which primarily offers athletic involvement for homeschooling students. Their football team won the 2016 ACSC State Championship.
