= Chelsea, Alabama =

City in Alabama, United States

- City
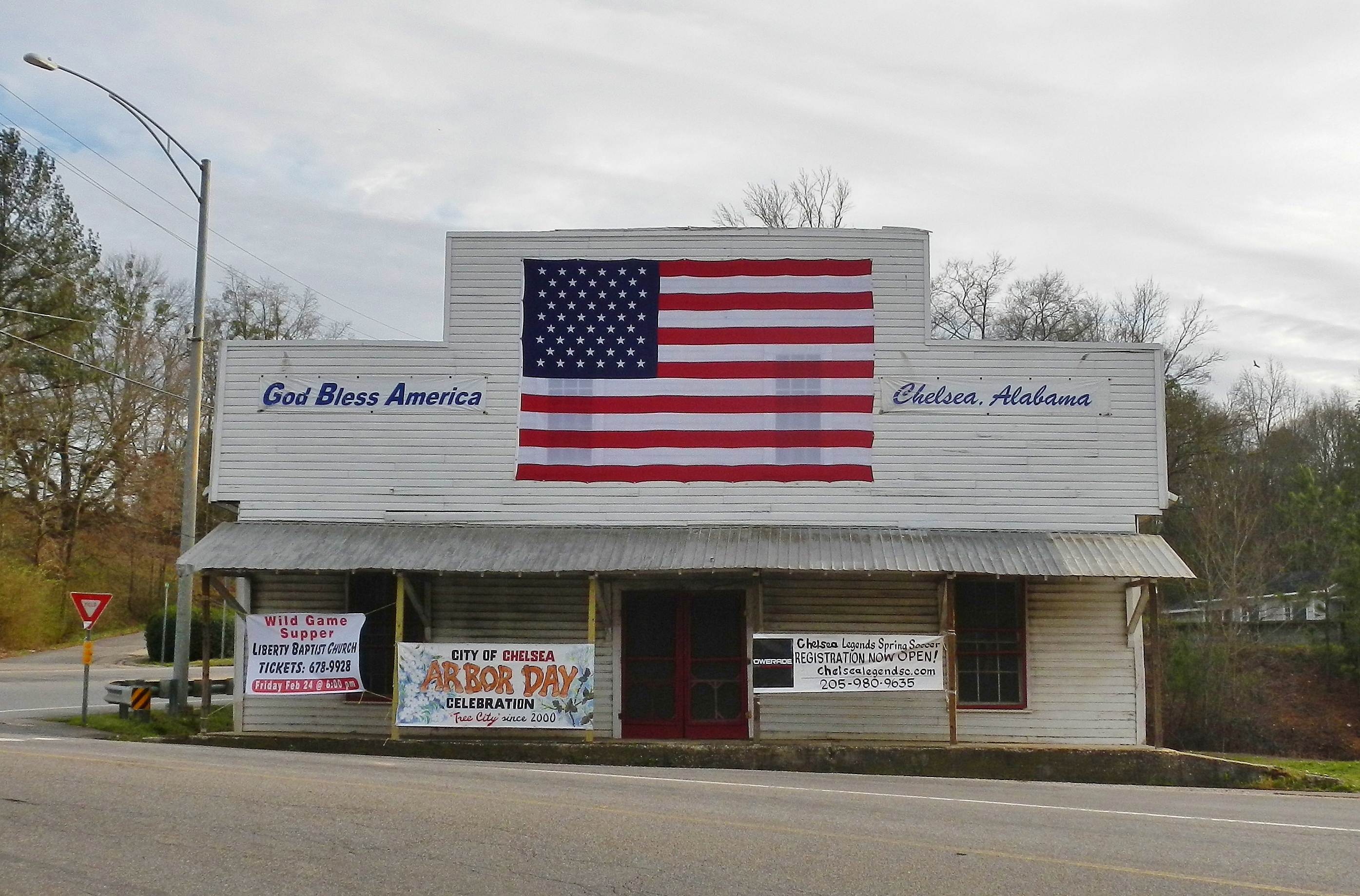
- Building that formerly stood in Chelsea

- Flag Seal Logo
- Motto: "It's all about family"
- Location of Chelsea in Shelby County, Alabama.
- Coordinates: 33°18′42″N 86°36′24″W
- Country: United States
- State: Alabama
- County: Shelby

Area
  - Total: 24.35 sq mi (63.06 km^{2})
  - Land: 23.93 sq mi (61.97 km^{2})
  - Water: 0.42 sq mi (1.09 km^{2})
- Elevation: 554 ft (169 m)

Population (2020)
  - Total: 14,982
  - Density: 626.1/sq mi (241.75/km^{2})
- Time zone: UTC-6 (CST)
  - Summer (DST): UTC-5 (CDT)
- ZIP code: 35043
- Area codes: 205, 659
- FIPS code: 01-14104
- GNIS feature ID: 2404037
- Website: cityofchelsea.com

Chelsea is a city in Shelby County, Alabama, United States. It is part of the Birmingham metropolitan area. Although Chelsea was incorporated on May 16, 1995, it was dissolved shortly thereafter over procedural errors. Another vote was held and the city was once again incorporated on March 1, 1996. According to the U.S. Census Bureau, the 2010 population for Chelsea was 10,183 and 14,126 in 2019. At the 2020 census, the population was 15,908.

== Geography ==
Chelsea is located near the central part of Shelby County. The city is traversed by multiple county highways, as well as U.S. Route 280, which runs through the northern part of the city, leading northwest 19 mi (31 km) to downtown Birmingham, and east 12 mi (19 km) to Harpersville. Double Oak Mountain, a southern extension of the Appalachian Mountains, runs northwest of the city. Part of the city limits extend along US 280 on top of the ridge.

== Demographics ==
Historical population
Census	Pop.	Note	%±
1990	1,329		—
2000	2,949		121.9%
2010	10,183		245.3%
2020	14,982		47.1%
2025 (est.)	17,716	▲	18.2%
U.S. Decennial Census

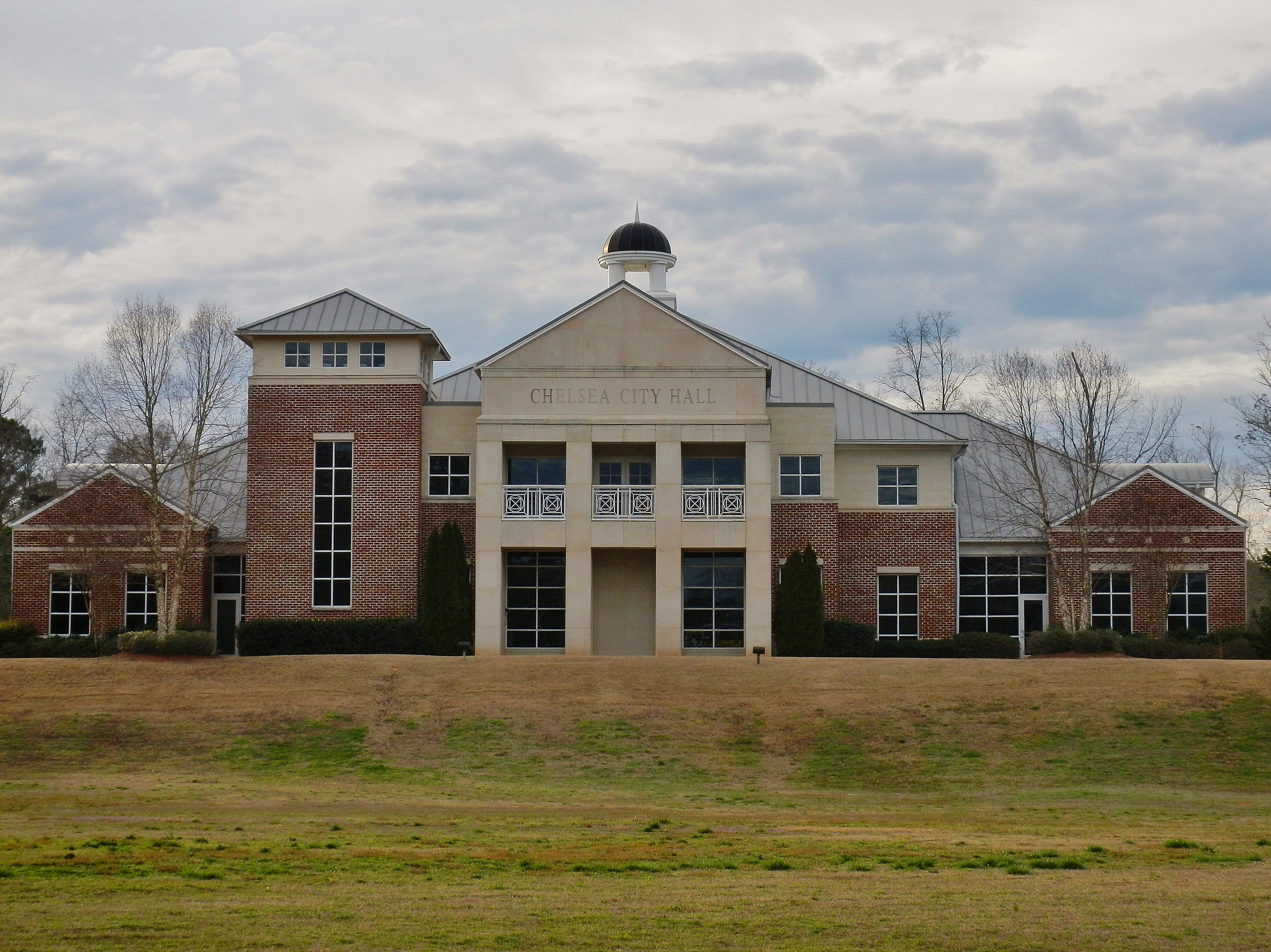
Chelsea City Hall

=== Racial and ethnic composition ===
Chelsea city, Alabama – Racial and ethnic composition Note: the US Census treats Hispanic/Latino as an ethnic category. This table excludes Latinos from the racial categories and assigns them to a separate category. Hispanics/Latinos may be of any race. Race and ethnicity were not surveyed for populations under 2,500 in the 1980 census and under 1,000 in 1990 census.
Race / Ethnicity (NH = Non-Hispanic)	Pop 1990	Pop 2000	Pop 2010	Pop 2020	% 1990	% 2000	% 2010	% 2020
White alone (NH)	1,293	2,841	8,919	11,941	97.29%	96.34%	87.59%	79.70%
Black or African American alone (NH)	18	23	581	1,365	1.35%	0.78%	5.71%	9.11%
Native American or Alaska Native alone (NH)	3	25	33	43	0.23%	0.85%	0.32%	0.29%
Asian alone (NH)	3	5	205	289	0.23%	0.17%	2.01%	1.93%
Native Hawaiian or Pacific Islander alone (NH)	x	1	13	2	x	0.03%	0.13%	0.01%
Other race alone (NH)	0	8	10	57	0.00%	0.27%	0.10%	0.38%
Mixed race or Multiracial (NH)	x	22	97	609	x	0.75%	0.95%	4.06%
Hispanic or Latino (any race)	12	24	325	676	0.90%	0.81%	3.19%	4.51%
Total	1,329	2,949	10,183	14,982	100.00%	100.00%	100.00%	100.00%

=== 2020 census ===
As of the 2020 census, Chelsea had a population of 14,982. There were 5,246 households and 3,650 families. The median age was 36.9 years. 28.2% of residents were under the age of 18 and 12.3% of residents were 65 years of age or older. For every 100 females there were 94.4 males, and for every 100 females age 18 and over there were 90.0 males age 18 and over.

There were 5,437 housing units, of which 3.5% were vacant. The homeowner vacancy rate was 1.5% and the rental vacancy rate was 4.1%.

39.3% of residents lived in urban areas, while 60.7% lived in rural areas.

=== 2010 census ===
In 2010, Chelsea had a population of 10,183. The racial and ethnic composition of the population was 90.5% white or Caucasian, 4.7% black or African American, 0.3% Native American, 2.0% Asian, 0.1% Pacific Islander, 1.1% from some other race, 1.3% from two or more races and 3.2% Hispanic or Latino of any race.

=== 2000 census ===
At the 2000 census, there were 2,949 people, 1,022 households and 849 families residing in the city. The population density was 293.6 inhabitants per square mile (113.4/km^{2}). There were 1,091 housing units at an average density of 108.6 per square mile (41.9/km^{2}). The racial makeup of the city was 96.78% White, 0.78% Black or African American, 0.88% Native American, 0.17% Asian, 0.03% Pacific Islander, 0.58% from other races, and 0.78% from two or more races. 0.81% of the population were Hispanic or Latino of any race.

There were 1,022 households, of which 44.2% had children under the age of 18 living with them, 74.2% were married couples living together, 6.6% had a female householder with no husband present, and 16.9% were non-families. 14.0% of all households were made up of individuals, and 4.1% had someone living alone who was 65 years of age or older. The average household size was 2.86 and the average family size was 3.17.

29.3% of the population were under the age of 18, 7.4% from 18 to 24, 34.0% from 25 to 44, 22.1% from 45 to 64, and 7.3% who were 65 years of age or older. The median age was 34 years. For every 100 females, there were 98.9 males. For every 100 females age 18 and over, there were 98.0 males.

The median income for a household in the city was $67,083, and the median income for a family was $72,206. Males had a median income of $46,071 versus $28,403 for females. The per capita income for the city was $24,717. About 5.5% of families and 7.2% of the population were below the poverty line, including 8.4% of those under age 18 and 9.2% of those age 65 or over.

The population of Chelsea is rapidly increasing due to new home construction in the area.

== Schools ==
Chelsea has four schools in the Shelby County School system:

- Chelsea Park Elementary (K-5)
- Forest Oaks Elementary (K-5)
- Chelsea Middle (6-8)
- Chelsea High School (9-12)

As of the 2022 school year Mt. Laurel Elementary was moved into the Oak Mountain School District due to pressure from the City of Chelsea to reduce 'overcrowding' at the middle and high school levels of the Chelsea School District, however Mt. Laurel Elementary still remains a part of the Shelby County School system.

== Local government ==
The City of Chelsea was incorporated March 1, 1996. As of 2022, Its municipal government was headed by the mayor, Tony Picklesimer, and city council members Scott Weygand, Chris Grace, Cody Sumners, Arthur Fisher Jr., and Casey Morris.

== Notable people ==
- Gary Bradberry, Charlie Bradberry, and Stanley Smith - NASCAR
- Fabian Sanchez - Dancing With The Stars member and "Mambo King"
- Paul Janeway - St. Paul and The Broken Bones lead singer
