= Brantleyville, Alabama =

- Census-designated place (CDP) and Unincorporated community
- Location of Brantleyville in Shelby County, Alabama.
- Coordinates: 33°13′09″N 86°52′34″W
- Country: United States
- State: Alabama
- County: Shelby

Area
  - Total: 2.20 sq mi (5.71 km^{2})
  - Land: 2.20 sq mi (5.69 km^{2})
  - Water: 0.012 sq mi (0.03 km^{2})
- Elevation: 548 ft (167 m)

Population (2020)
  - Total: 931
  - Density: 423.9/sq mi (163.68/km^{2})
- Time zone: UTC-6 (Central (CST))
  - Summer (DST): UTC-5 (CDT)
- Area codes: 205, 659
- GNIS feature ID: 2582663

Brantleyville is a census-designated place and Unincorporated community in western Shelby County, Alabama, United States. As of the 2020 census, Brantleyville had a population of 931.

== History ==
The Brantleyville Baptist Church burned down in 1953.

== Demographics ==
Historical population
Census	Pop.	Note	%±
2010	884		—
2020	931		5.3%
U.S. Decennial Census

Brantleyville was first listed as a census designated place in the 2010 U.S. census.

Brantleyville CDP, Alabama – Racial and ethnic composition Note: the US Census treats Hispanic/Latino as an ethnic category. This table excludes Latinos from the racial categories and assigns them to a separate category. Hispanics/Latinos may be of any race.
Race / Ethnicity (NH = Non-Hispanic)	Pop 2010	Pop 2020	% 2010	% 2020
White alone (NH)	711	602	80.43%	64.66%
Black or African American alone (NH)	29	44	3.28%	4.73%
Native American or Alaska Native alone (NH)	6	7	0.68%	0.75%
Asian alone (NH)	4	1	0.45%	0.11%
Native Hawaiian or Pacific Islander alone (NH)	0	1	0.00%	0.11%
Other race alone (NH)	0	0	0.00%	0.00%
Mixed race or Multiracial (NH)	23	31	2.60%	3.33%
Hispanic or Latino (any race)	111	245	12.56%	26.32%
Total	884	931	100.00%	100.00%
