= Within Reason =

American rock band

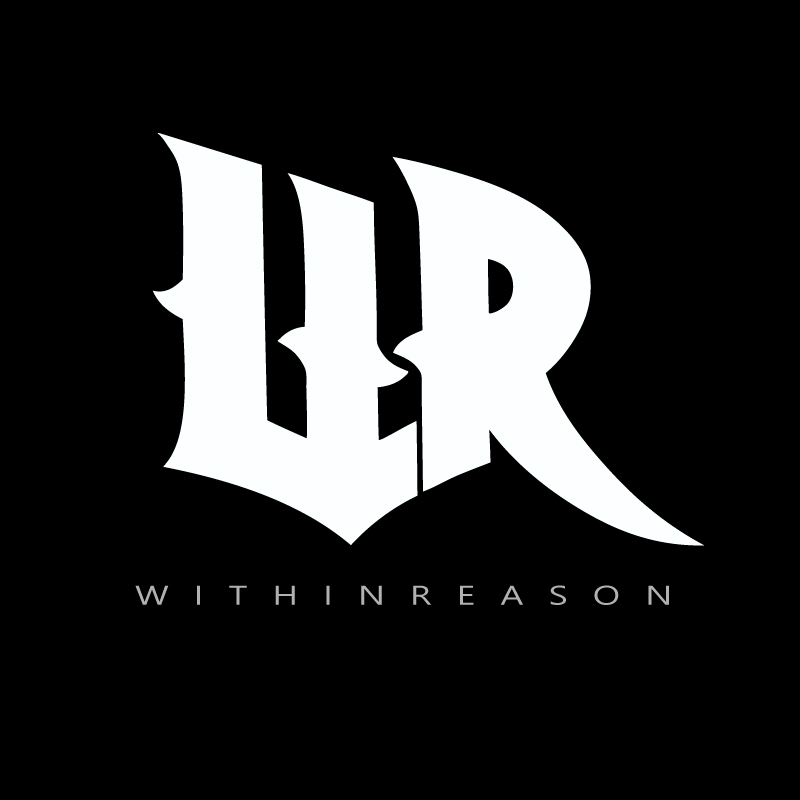
- Within Reason's logo

Background information
- Origin: Birmingham, Alabama
- Genres: Hard rock, alternative rock, post-grunge
- Years active: 2005–present
- Members: Chris Dow; David Koonce
- Past members: Josh "Mook" Miljavac; Griffin Zarbough; Kevin Smith; Ben McCullars; Matt Barnes; Jordan Foster Touring Members: Chase Davidson; Sam Brown II; Adam Jefferson; Blake Medders
- Website: withinreasonmusic.com

Within Reason is an American rock band from Birmingham, Alabama, whose founding members include Chris Dow and David Koonce. The band was formed in 2005.

The band has released three studio albums, Bloodshot Life (2009), After The Crawl (2012), and Battlefields Life, Love, & War (2017) accompanied by three charted singles on the Active Rock and Billboard charts.

== History ==
=== 2005–2007: Formation and Cycle A Smile ===
In September 2006, Within Reason released their first Demo EP, Cycle A Smile. In January 2007, Within Reason appeared and performed live on the TV show One Tree Hill to an audience of over 4 million. When the episode was filmed, the song they were set to perform was changed to "Favorite Sin". Another track from Cycle A Smile, "Let It Out", was also featured during the fourth season of the series.

The band was voted "Rock Band of the Year" and "Performer of the Year" for the 2007 BAMA Music Awards (Birmingham, Alabama).

The single "Favorite Sin" was featured on a compilation disc with a segment on the band in the May 2008 issue of Metal Edge Magazine. Five songs on a new video game called Motorm4x off-road extreme released in June 2008.

=== 2008–2011: Bloodshot Life ===
In August 2008, Within Reason began working on an album with multi-platinum producer Rick Beato which was released February 2009 called Bloodshot Life.

In support of the Bloodshot Life release, the band toured as direct support for Pop Evil through the summer of 2010.

=== 2012–2014: After The Crawl ===
Within Reason's third studio album After The Crawl was released on March 20, 2012. It was produced by Nick Chahwala and recorded in Atlanta, Georgia.

To support of the new album, Within Reason joined the Rockstar Energy UPROAR Festival tour featuring Shinedown, Godsmack, Staind, Adelita's Way, POD, Deuce and many others.

In January 2013, Within Reason performed a concert at the Clive Davis Theatre in Los Angeles that was taped for a GRAMMY Live segment. The band was also featured in a commercial for Microsoft Surface tablet playing their song "We'll Have It All". The ad aired during the GRAMMY broadcast in 2013. The band was also featured on GRAMMY Live from the Red Carpet during the pre-show.

In the spring of 2014, Within Reason released their first single from After The Crawl, "Enemy", to radio. The song peaked at No. 46. In summer 2014 the band once again joined the Rockstar Energy Uproar Festival tour followed by a North American Tour with Godsmack, Seether, Skillet, Pop Evil, and Buckcherry.

In January 2015, their second single "Here Comes The Light" was released to radio accompanied by a music video produced by the band's bassist, David Koonce. The single peaked at No. 39 on the Active Rock chart giving the band their first radio hit song.

=== 2015–2017: Battlefields Life, Love, & War ===
After a summer tour with Buckcherry, the band began writing for their third album. They completed a fall tour with Seether and Saint Asonia in October 2015. The band began 2016 with a winter tour with Hinder followed by recording their next album co-produced by Hinder's Cody Hanson and Marshal Dutton. The album titled Battlefields, Life Love and War was released in April 2017. "Invictus", the first single from Battlefields, Life Love and War became the band's most successful single to date, climbing to #29 on the Active Rock chart and to #31 on Billboard.

=== 2018–present ===
In 2019, Within Reason released a 10th Anniversary version of their 2009 release "Bloodshot Life" The 2019 version of the album featured the original track listing plus live tracks recorded during the Bloodshot Life Tour in 2010. The album also included five original demo tracks. Two of the demos songs, "Missed Out" and "Change For You" were songs that had been previously listed on the band's 2006 EP "Cycle A Smile".

The band went on hiatus prior to the COVID-19 pandemic in 2020. Founding member, Chris Dow began a side project titled "Julian Sun" in early 2021. Within Reason was scheduled to resume working on a new project in 2023 that was originally slated for the fall of 2020.

Albums	Year
Cycle A Smile (demo)	2006
Bloodshot Life	2009
After The Crawl	2012
Battlefields Life Love and War	2017
Bloodshot Life (10th Anniversary)	2019

== Singles ==
Title	Year	Peak chart positions		Album
Title	Year	Act. Rock	US Main.	Album
"Favorite Sin"	2008	—	—	Bloodshot Life
"Enemy"	2014	46	—	After The Crawl
"Here Comes The Light"	2015	39	—	After The Crawl
"Invictus"	2017	29	31	Battlefields Life Love and War

== Members ==
Classic line-up

- Chris Dow – lead vocals (2005–present)
- David Koonce – bass (2005–present )
- Josh "Mook" Miljavac – guitar (2005–2012)
- Griffin Zarbough – drums (2005–2016)
- Kevin Smith – guitar (2005–2008)
- Matt Barnes – guitar, backing vocals (2011–2013)
- Jordan Foster – guitar, backing vocals (2015–2017)

Touring Members

- Adam Jefferson – guitar, backing vocals (2009–2010)
- Blake Medders– guitar, backing vocals (2010–2011)
- Chase Davidson – guitar, backing vocals (2013–2015, died 2025)
- Sam Brown II – drums (2016–2017)
