= Shelby County Schools (Alabama) =

School district in Alabama, United States

Location
- Columbiana, Alabama United States
- Coordinates: 33°10′49″N 86°36′08″W

District information
- Type: Public
- Motto: Prepared for the journey
- Grades: PK-12
- Established: 1856
- Superintendent: Dr. Lewis Brooks
- Schools: 36
- Budget: $293.7 million
- NCES District ID: 0103030

Students and staff
- Students: 22,809
- Teachers: 1,426
- Staff: 1,605

Other information
- Website: http://www.shelbyed.k12.al.us/

Shelby County Schools is the school district of Shelby County, Alabama. Its headquarters are in Columbiana.

On February 26, 2025, the Shelby County School Board terminated a cafeteria worker for soliciting donations to offset students' lunch bills.

== History ==
Shelby County Schools began operations in 1856 under superintendent Mr. Henry M. Jones.

In 1968, Shelby County Schools became subject to a desegregation order as part of the Lee vs. Macon County case.

In July 2014, Pelham City Schools separated from the county system, which reduced the system's revenue by 16%. Prior to the separation, Pelham High School, Valley Elementary School, Valley Intermediate School, Riverchase Middle School were part of Shelby County Schools.

== Schools ==
As of 2026, Shelby County Schools operates 31 schools, which are subdivided into school seven zones: the Calera Zone, the Chelsea Zone, the Montevallo Zone, the Oak Mountain Zone, the Columbiana Zone, the Helena Zone, and the Vincent Zone.

=== Elementary Schools ===
- Calera Elementary School (K-2)
- Chelsea Park Elementary School (K-5)
- Forest Oaks Elementary School (K-5)
- Montevallo Elementary School (K-5)
- Inverness Elementary School (K-3)
- Mt Laurel Elementary School (K-5)
- Oak Mountain Elementary School (K-3)
- Elvin Hill Elementary School (K-5)
- Wilsonville Elementary School (K-5)
- Helena Elementary School (K-2)
- Vincent Elementary School (K-5)

=== Intermediate Schools ===
- Calera Intermediate School (3–5)
- Oak Mountain Intermediate School (3–5)
- Helena Intermediate School (4–5)

=== Middle Schools ===
- Calera Middle School (6–8)
- Chelsea Middle School (6–8)
- Montevallo Middle School (6–8)
- Oak Mountain Middle School (6–8)
- Columbiana Middle School (6–8)
- Helena Middle School (6–8)
- Vincent Middle School (6–8)

=== High Schools ===
- Calera High School
- Chelsea High School
- Helena High School
- Montevallo High School
- Oak Mountain High School
- Shelby County High School
- Vincent High School

=== Centralized Schools ===
- Shelby County Career Technical Education Center
- Linda Nolen Learning Center (Special Needs School)
- New Direction (Alternative School)
- Success Program (Dropout Prevention Program)
- Virtual Shelby
