= Prison =

Facility where people are kept as punishment

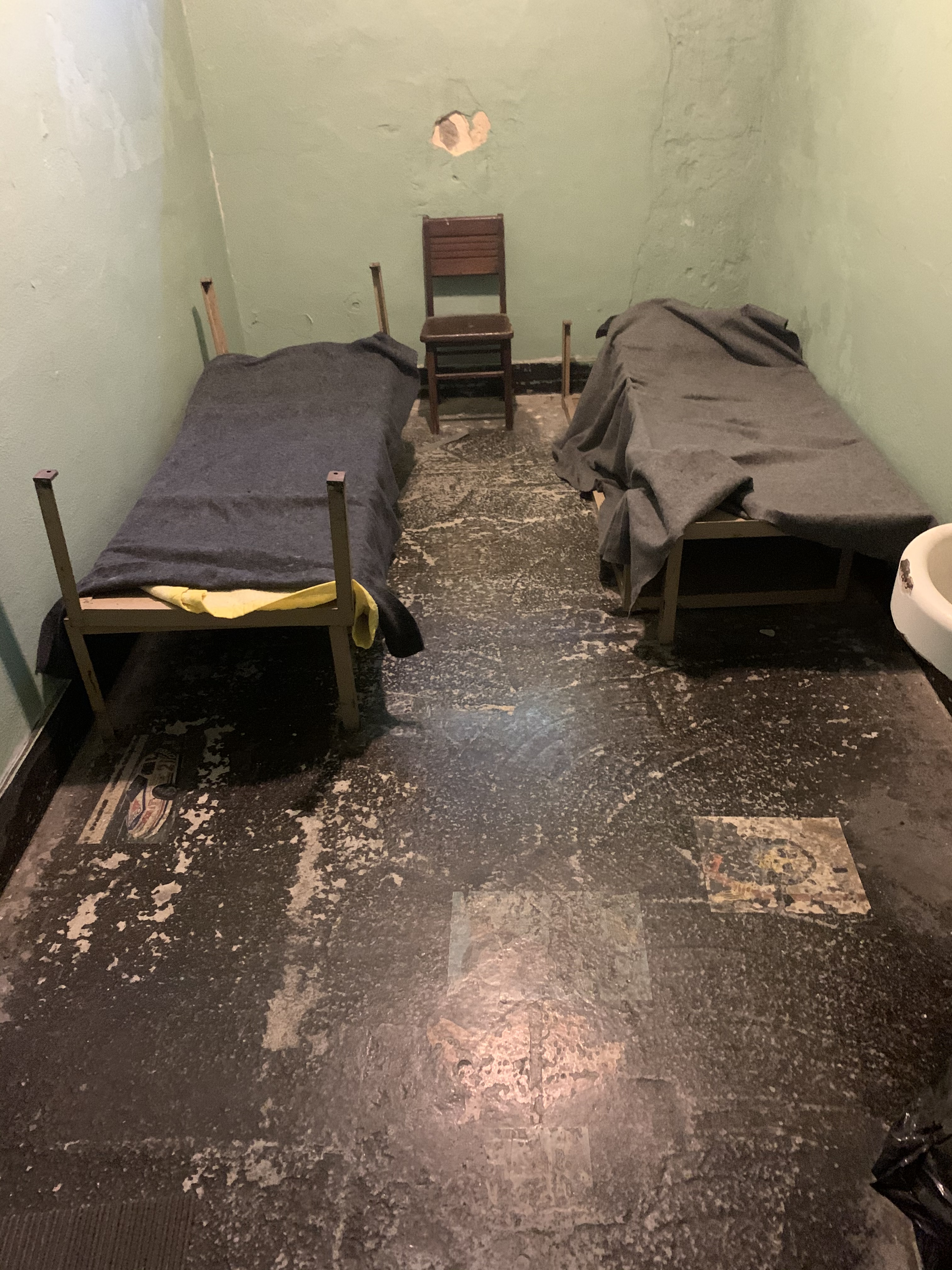
A 19th-century jail room at a Pennsylvania museum

A prison, (Note: From the Old French prisoun) also known as a jail, (Note: In American and Canadian English, prison and jail usually refer to separate things in formal speech. In general, a prison is a place where individuals given long sentences are incarcerated, while a jail is a place where individuals in pretrial custody or given short sentences are sent. In the United States, jails are often run by counties or groups of counties, while prisons are run by the state or federal government.) (Note: "Gaol" is an archaic British and South African spelling also used historically in Ireland, Canada and Australia. The spelling jail is preferred because gaol does not follow the usual English pronunciation rules for hard and soft G and ao is not a standard English diphthong.) penitentiary, detention center, (Note: In Britain a 'detention centre' is a military detention facility, not a prison) correction center, correctional facility, or remand center, is a facility where people are imprisoned under the authority of the state, usually as punishment for various crimes. They may also be used to house those awaiting trial (pre-trial detention). Prisons serve two primary functions within the criminal-justice system: holding people charged with crimes while they await trial, and confining those who have pleaded guilty or been convicted to serve out their sentences.

Prisons can also be used as a tool for political repression by authoritarian regimes who detain perceived opponents for political crimes, often without a fair trial or due process; this use is illegal under most forms of international law governing fair administration of justice. In times of war, belligerents or neutral countries may detain prisoners of war or detainees in military prisons or in prisoner-of-war camps. At any time, states may imprison civilians – sometimes large groups of civilians – in internment camps.

== Terminology ==
The terminology used to describe or distinguish between prisons and other correctional facilities can vary between nations and jurisdictions.

=== Australia ===
In Australia, the words "gaol", "jail" and "prison" are commonly used. The spelling "gaol" was in official use in the past, and many historical gaols are now tourist attractions, such as the Maitland Gaol. Officially, the term "correctional centre" is used for almost all prisons in New South Wales and Queensland, while other states and territories use a variety of names. "Prison" is officially used for some facilities in South Australia, Victoria and Western Australia. Youth prisons in Australia are referred to as "youth correctional facilities" or "youth detention centres" among other names, depending on the jurisdiction. Those held on remand without bail are held in remand centres.

=== Canada ===
In Canada, while the terms "jail" and "prison" are commonly used in speech, officially named facilities use "facility", "correctional centre", "penitentiary", or "institution". A number of facilities retain their historical designation as a "jail".

=== New Zealand ===
In New Zealand, the terms "jail" and "prison" are commonly used, although the term "correctional facility", among others, are in official usage.

=== Papua New Guinea ===
In Papua New Guinea, "prison" is officially used, although "jail" is widely understood and more common in use.

=== UK and Ireland ===
The official modern term is "prison" (e.g. HM Prison Barlinnie or Mountjoy Prison). The spelling "gaol" is obsolete in modern speech but is still found in older texts, and in historical and legal contexts.

The Gaols Act 1823 describes two types of prison: gaols and houses of correction.

Houses of correction were first established by the Poor Relief Act 1601 in England and Wales, as a place to send the "idle poor" and vagrants for hard labor. Later laws added the functions of punishment for minor crimes after summary jurisdiction, and pre-trial detention. The function of dealing with the poor was replaced by workhouses and then general public assistance.

=== United States ===
In American English, the terms "prison" and "jail" have separate uses, though this is not always adhered to in casual speech and the manner in which correctional facilities are officially described varies by state.

- A "jail" holds people for shorter periods of time (for example, less than a year) or for pre-trial detention and is usually operated by a local government, typically the county sheriff.
- A "prison" or "penitentiary" holds people for longer periods of time, such as many years, and is operated by a state or federal government. After a conviction, a sentenced person is typically sent to prison.

== History ==
=== Ancient and medieval ===
The use of prisons can be traced back to the rise of the state as a form of social organization.

Some Ancient Greek philosophers, such as Plato, began to develop ideas of using punishment to reform offenders instead of for retribution. Imprisonment as a penalty was used commonly for those who could not afford to pay their fines. Eventually, since impoverished Athenians could not pay their fines, leading to indefinite periods of imprisonment, time limits were set instead. The prison in ancient Athens was known as the desmoterion or "the place of chains".

The Romans were among the first to use prisons as a form of punishment rather than simply for detention. A variety of existing structures were used to house prisoners, such as metal cages, basements of public buildings, and quarries. One of the most notable Roman prisons was the Mamertine Prison, established around 640 B.C. by Ancus Marcius. The Mamertine Prison was located within a sewer system beneath ancient Rome and contained a large network of dungeons where prisoners were held in squalid conditions contaminated with human waste. Forced labor on public works projects was also a common form of punishment. In many cases, citizens were sentenced to slavery, often in ergastula (a primitive form of prison where unruly slaves were chained to workbenches and performed hard labor). There were numerous prisons not only in the capital Rome, but throughout the Roman Empire. However, a regulated prison system did not emerge.

There is a reference to ancient Egyptian imprisonment in the narrative about Joseph in the Book of Genesis: he is thrown into "the prison where the king’s prisoners were confined" following a false allegation of rape.

In medieval Songhai, results of a trial could have led to confiscation of merchandise or imprisonment as a form of punishment, since various prisons existed in the empire.

During the Middle Ages in Europe, castles, fortresses, and the basements of public buildings were often used as makeshift prisons. The capability to imprison citizens granted an air of legitimacy to officials at all levels of government and served as a signifier of who possessed power or authority over others. Another common punishment was sentencing people to galley slavery, which involved chaining prisoners together in the bottoms of ships and forcing them to row on naval or merchant vessels.

=== Modern era ===
The French philosopher Michel Foucault, especially his book Discipline and Punish: The Birth of the Prison (1975), energized the historical study of prisons and their role in the overall social system. The book analyzed changes in Western penal systems during the modern age based on historical documents from France. Foucault argues that prison did not become the principal form of punishment just because of the humanitarian concerns of reformists. He traces the cultural shifts that led to the predominance of prison via the body and power. Prisons use "disciplines" – new technological powers that can be found, according to Foucault, in diverse institutions such as schools, hospitals, and military barracks.

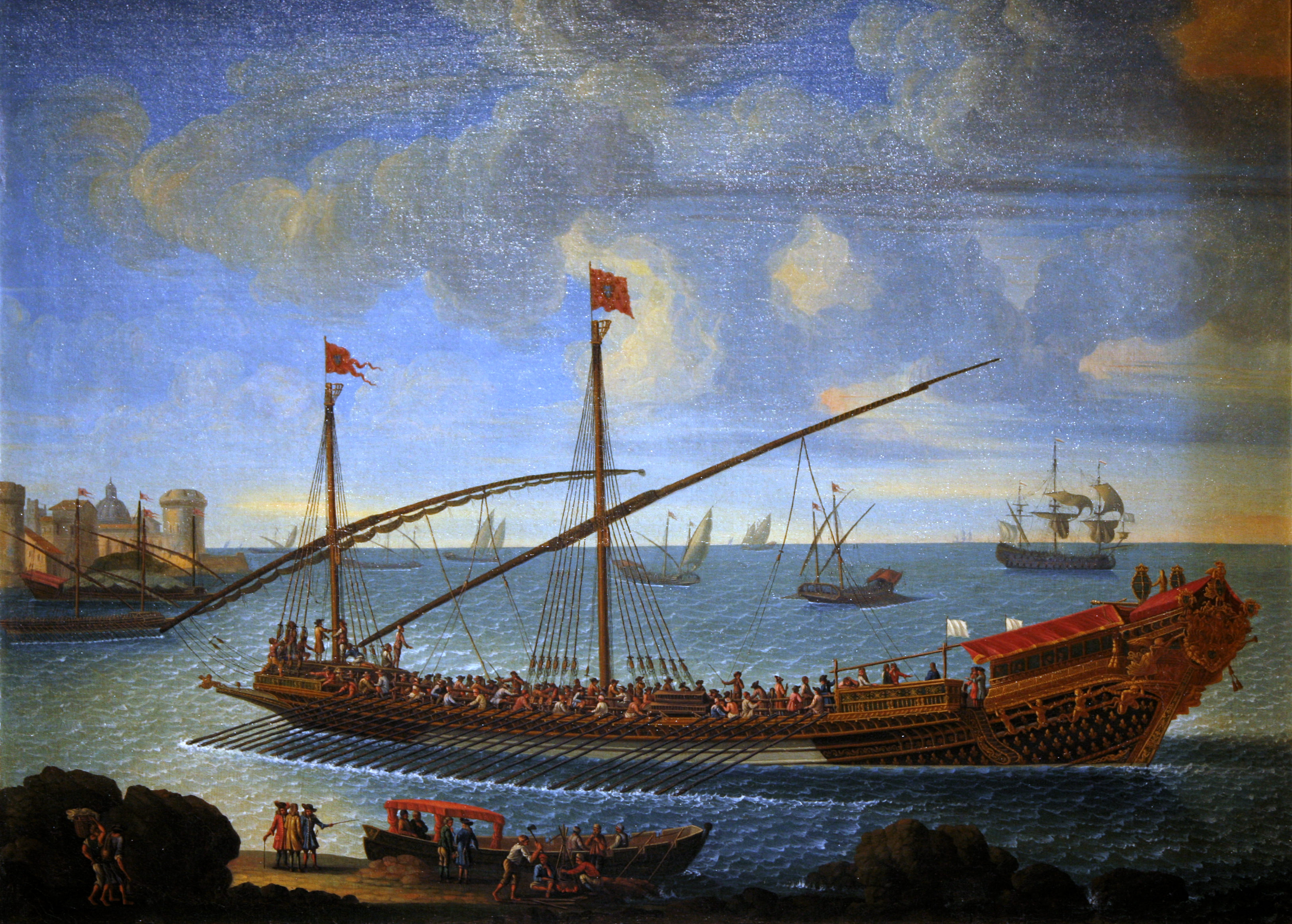
A common punishment in Early Modern Europe was to be made a galley slave. The galley pictured here belonged to the Mediterranean fleet of Louis XIV, c. 1694.

From the late 17th century and during the 18th century, popular resistance to public execution and torture became more widespread both in Europe and in the United States. Particularly under the Bloody Code, with few sentencing alternatives, transportation to the Americas having been suspended following the Revolution, and imposition of the death penalty for petty crimes, such as theft, proving increasingly unpopular with the public; many jurors were refusing to convict defendants of petty crimes when they knew the defendants would be sentenced to death, rulers began looking for means to punish and control their subjects in a way that did not cause people to associate them with spectacles of tyrannical and sadistic violence. They developed systems of mass incarceration, often with hard labor, as a solution. The prison reform movement that arose at this time was heavily influenced by two somewhat contradictory philosophies. The first was based in Enlightenment ideas of utilitarianism and rationalism and suggested that prisons should simply be used as a more effective substitute for public corporal punishments such as whipping, hanging, etc. The deterrence theory claims that the primary purpose of prisons is to be so harsh and terrifying that they deter people from committing crimes out of fear of going to prison. The second theory, which saw prisons as a form of rehabilitation or moral reform, was based on religious ideas that equated crime with sin and saw prisons as a place to instruct prisoners in Christian morality, obedience and proper behavior. These later reformers believed that prisons could be constructed as humane institutions of moral instruction and that prisoners' behavior could be "corrected" so that when they were released, they would be model members of society.

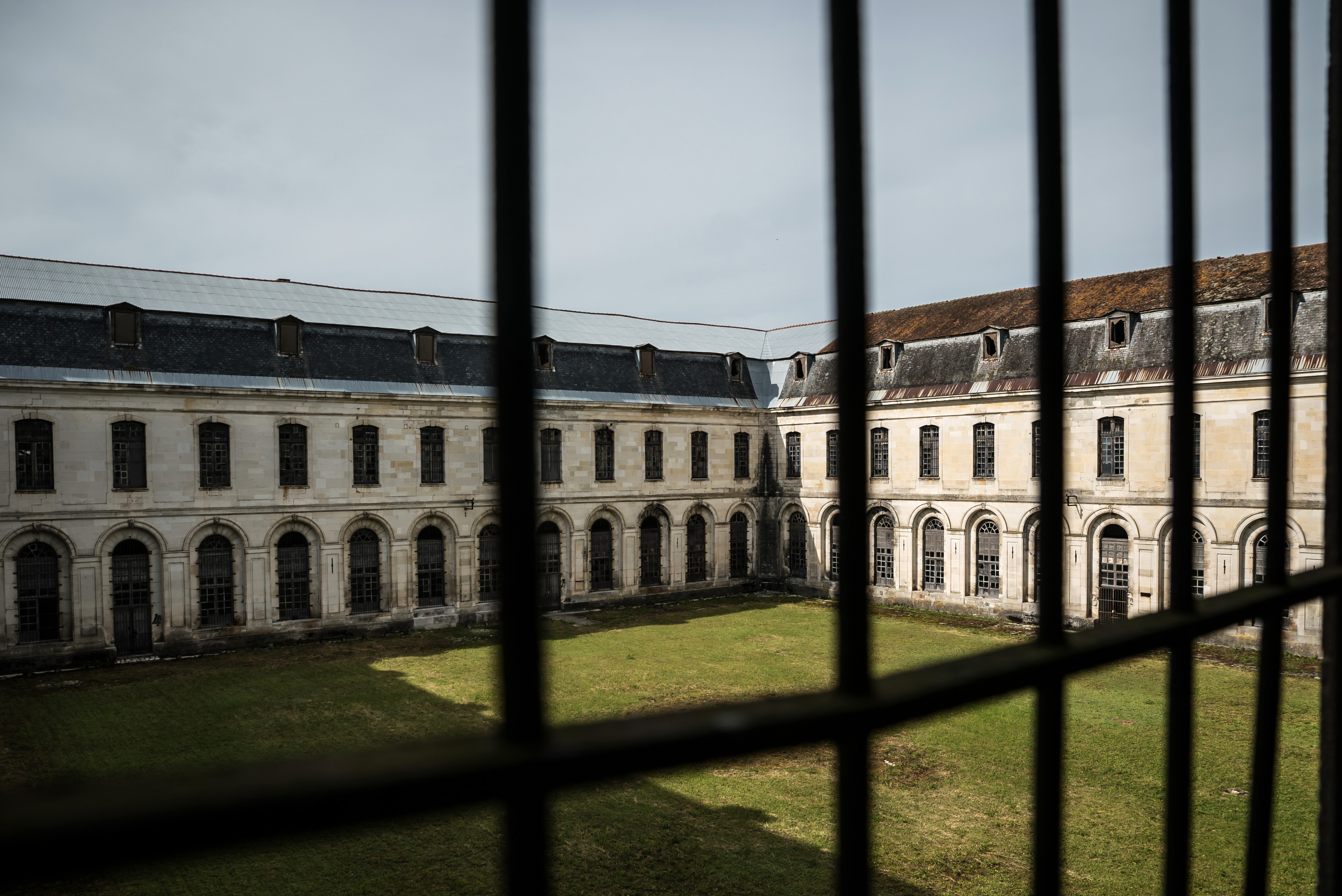
In the modern era, many fortified buildings, such as abbeys and fortresses, were converted to use as prisons. Pictured is the cloister of Clairvaux Abbey, converted to a prison exercise yard after secularization.

The concept of the modern prison as a highly regimented total institution was imported to Europe in the early 19th-century from America. Prior forms of punishment were usually physical, including capital punishment, mutilation, flagellation (whipping), branding, and non-physical punishments, such as public shaming rituals (like the stocks). From the Middle Ages up to the 16th and 17th centuries in Europe, imprisonment was rarely used as a punishment in its own right, and prisons were mainly to hold those awaiting trial or punishment.

However, an important innovation at the time was the Bridewell House of Corrections, located at Bridewell Palace in London, which resulted in the building of other houses of correction. These houses held mostly petty offenders, vagrants, and the disorderly local poor. In these facilities, the inmates were given "prison labor" jobs that were anticipated to shape them into hardworking individuals and prepare them for the real world. By the end of the 17th century, houses of correction were absorbed into local prison facilities under the control of the local justice of the peace.

==== Transportation, prison ships and penal colonies ====
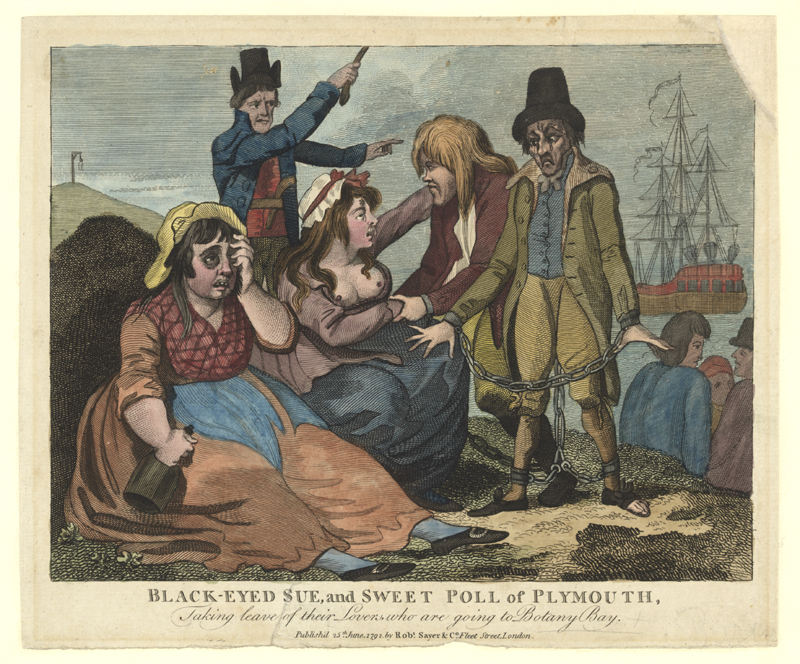
Women in Plymouth, England (Black-eyed Sue and Sweet Poll) mourning their lovers who are soon to be transported to Botany Bay (1792)

England used penal transportation of convicted criminals (and others generally young and poor) for a term of indentured servitude within the general population of British America between the 1610s and 1776. The Transportation Act 1717 made this option available for lesser crimes, or offered it by discretion as a longer-term alternative to the death penalty, which could theoretically be imposed for the growing number of offenses in Britain. The substantial expansion of transportation was the first major innovation in eighteenth-century British penal practice. Transportation to America was abruptly suspended by the Criminal Law Act 1776 (16 Geo. 3. c. 43) with the start of the American Revolutionary War. While sentencing to transportation continued, the act instituted a punishment policy of hard labor instead. The suspension of transport also prompted the use of prisons for punishment and the initial start of a prison building program. Britain would resume transportation to specifically planned penal colonies in Australia between 1788 and 1868. (Note: For a more detailed look at the English "transportation" system, and the transition from penal colonies to prisons, see Hostettler, John (2009). A History of Criminal Justice in England and Wales. Waterside Press. p. 157. ISBN 978-1-906534-79-0.)

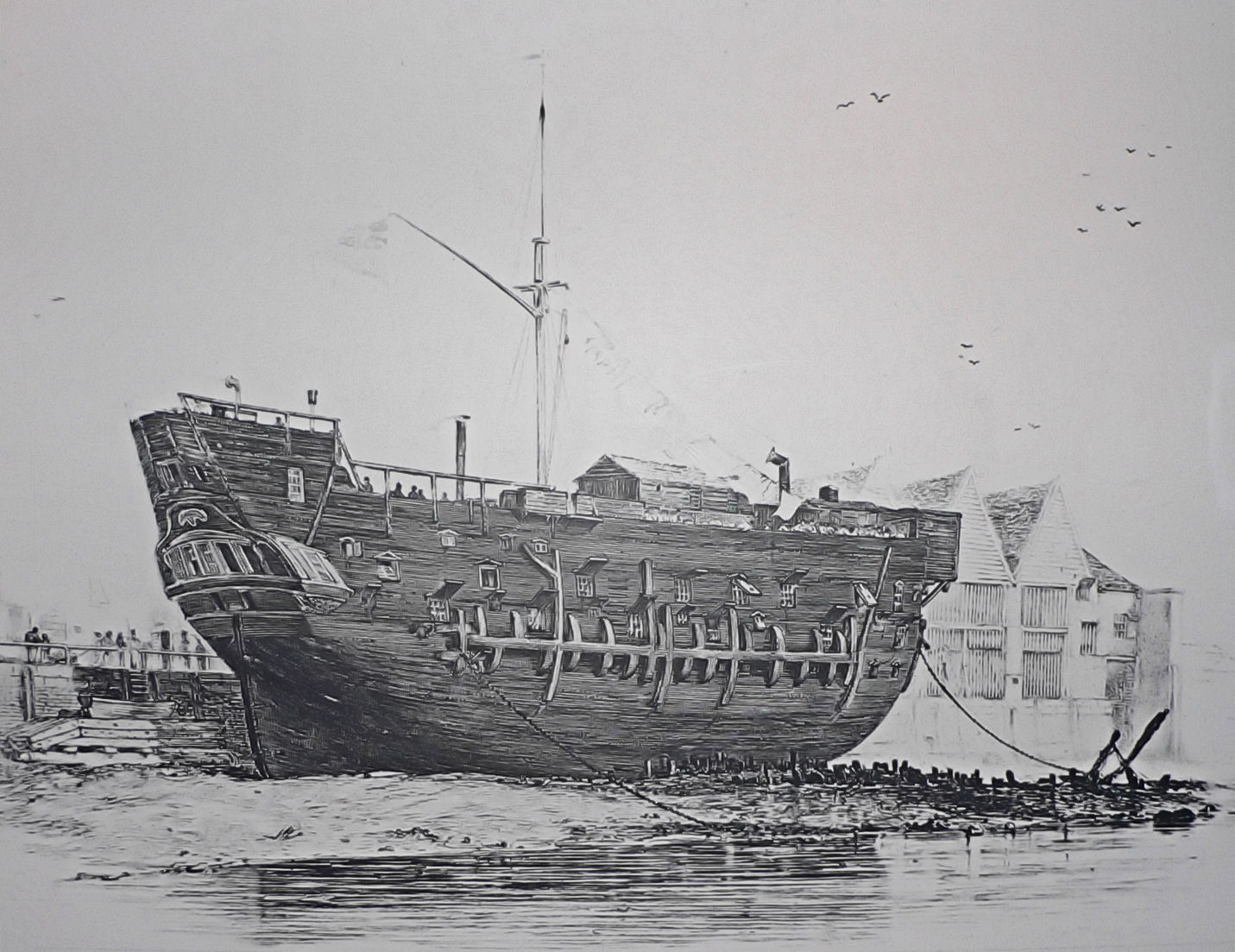
The beached convict ship HMS Discovery at Deptford served as a convict hulk between 1818 and 1834.

Jails at the time were run as business ventures and contained both felons and debtors; the latter were often housed with their wives and younger children. The jailers made their money by charging the inmates for food, drink, and other services, and the system was generally corruptible. One reform of the seventeenth century was the establishment of the London Bridewell as a house of correction for women and children. It was the first facility to make any medical services available to prisoners.

With the widely used alternative of penal transportation halted in the 1770s, the immediate need for additional penal accommodations emerged. Given the undeveloped institutional facilities, old sailing vessels, termed hulks, were the most readily available and expandable choice to be used as places of temporary confinement. While conditions on these ships were generally appalling, their use and the labor thus provided set a precedent which persuaded many people that mass incarceration and labor were viable methods of crime prevention and punishment. The turn of the 19th century would see the first movement toward prison reform, and by the 1810s, the first state prisons and correctional facilities were built, thereby inaugurating the modern prison facilities available today.

France also sent criminals to overseas penal colonies, including Louisiana, in the early 18th century. Penal colonies in French Guiana operated until 1952, such as the notable Devil's Island (Île du Diable). Katorga prisons were harsh work camps established in the 17th century in Russia, in remote underpopulated areas of Siberia and the Russian Far East, that had few towns or food sources. Siberia quickly gained its fearful connotation of punishment.

==== Prison reform movement ====
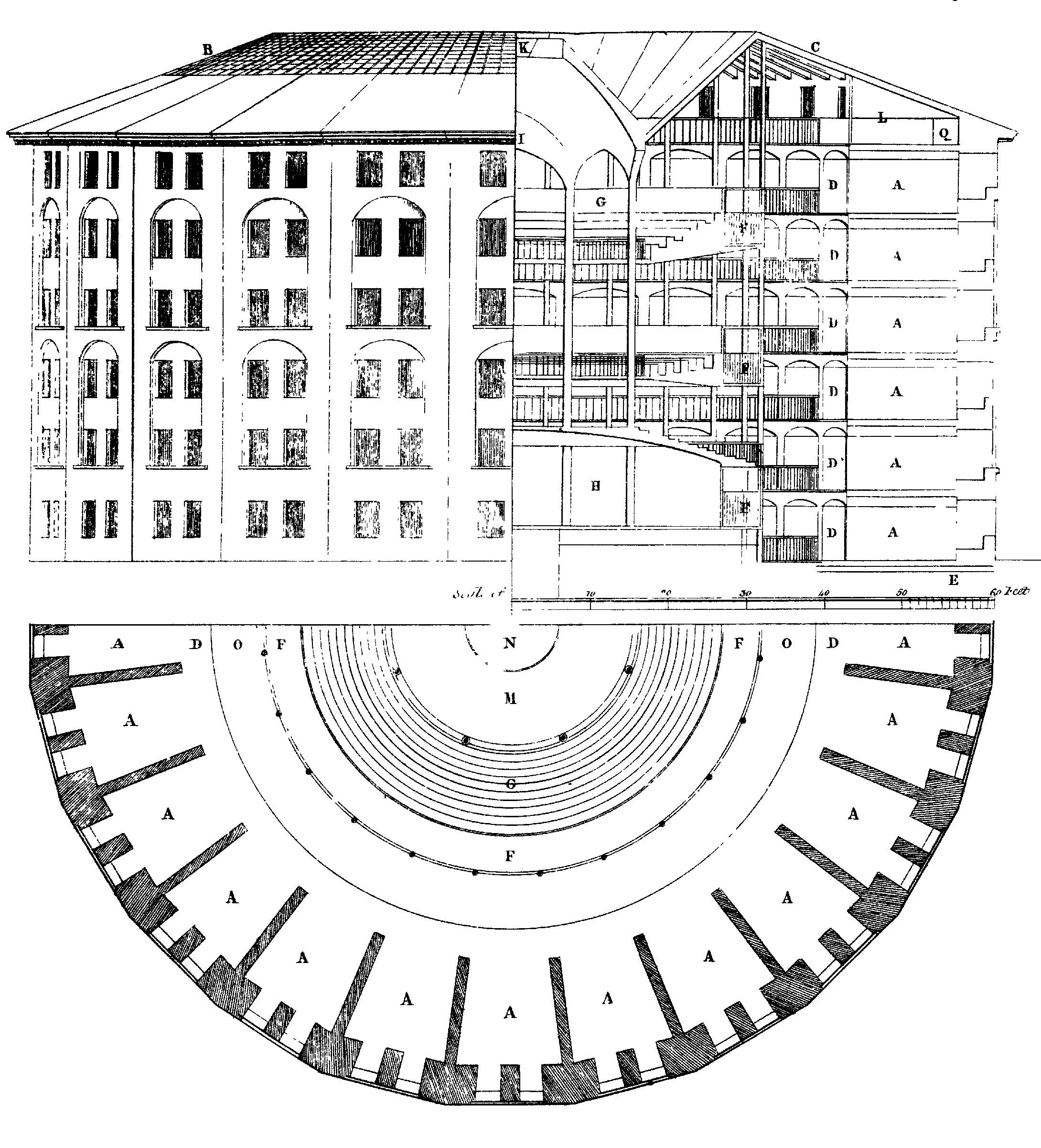
Jeremy Bentham's "panopticon" prison introduced many of the principles of surveillance and social control that underpin the design of the modern prison. In the panopticon model, prisoners were housed in one-person cells arranged in a circular pattern, all facing towards a central observation tower in such a way that the guards could see into all of the cells from the observation tower, while the prisoners were unable to see the guards. (Note: For an in-depth treatment of Bentham's panopticon, see Semple, Janet (1993). Bentham's Prison: A Study of the Panopticon Penitentiary: A Study of the Panopticon Penitentiary. Oxford University Press. ISBN 978-0-19-159081-8.) (architectural drawing by Willey Reveley, 1791)

John Howard was one of the most notable early prison reformers. (Note: But some authors have pointed out that many historical treatments overemphasize Howard's work, and that there were many other individuals (including local prison administrators) that also played a significant role in the development of modern prisons. See DeLacy, Margaret (1986). "The Eighteenth Century Gaol". Prison Reform in Lancashire, 1700–1850: A Study in Local Administration. Manchester University Press. ISBN 978-0-7190-1341-6.) After having visited several hundred prisons across Great Britain and Europe, in his capacity as high sheriff of Bedfordshire, he published The State of the Prisons in 1777. He was particularly appalled to discover prisoners who had been acquitted but were still confined because they could not pay the jailer's fees. He proposed wide-ranging reforms to the system, including the housing of each prisoner in a separate cell and the requirements that staff should be professional and paid by the government, that outside inspection of prisons should be imposed, and that prisoners should be provided with a healthy diet and reasonable living conditions. The prison reform charity, the Howard League for Penal Reform, was established in 1866 by his admirers.

Following Howard's agitation, the Penitentiary Act 1799 was passed. This introduced solitary confinement, religious instruction, a labor regime, and proposed two state penitentiaries (one for men and one for women). However, these were never built due to disagreements in the committee and pressures from wars with France, and jails remained a local responsibility. But other measures passed in the next few years provided magistrates with the powers to implement many of these reforms, and eventually, in 1815, jail fees were abolished.

Quakers were prominent in campaigning against and publicizing the dire state of the prisons at the time. Elizabeth Fry documented the conditions that prevailed at Newgate prison, where the ladies' section was overcrowded with women and children, some of whom had not even received a trial. The inmates did their own cooking and washing in the small cells in which they slept on straw. The section was described "like a den of wild beasts; it was filled with women unsexed, fighting, swearing, dancing, gaming, yelling and justly deserved its name of 'hell above ground'." In 1816, Fry founded a prison school for the children who were imprisoned with their parents. She also began a system of supervision and required the women to sew and to read the Bible. In 1817, she helped to found the Association for the Reformation of the Female Prisoners in Newgate.

==== Development of the modern prison ====
The theory of the modern prison system was born in London, influenced by the utilitarianism of Jeremy Bentham. Bentham's panopticon introduced the principle of observation and control that underpins the design of the modern prison. The notion of prisoners being incarcerated as part of their punishment, and not simply as a holding state until trial or hanging, was at the time revolutionary. His views influenced the establishment of the first prisons used as criminal rehabilitation centers. At a time when the implementation of capital punishment for a variety of relatively trivial offenses was on the decline, the notion of incarceration as a form of punishment and correction held great appeal to reform-minded thinkers and politicians.

In the first half of the 19th century, capital punishment came to be regarded as inappropriate for many crimes that it had previously been carried out for, and by the mid-19th century, imprisonment had replaced the death penalty for the most serious offenses except for murder.

The first state prison in England was the Millbank Prison, established in 1816 with a capacity for just under 1,000 inmates. By 1824, 54 prisons had adopted the disciplinary system advocated by the Society for the Improvement of Prison Discipline (SIPD). By the 1840s, penal transportation to Australia and the use of hulks was on the decline, and the Surveyor-General of convict prisons, Joshua Jebb, set an ambitious program of prison building in the country, with one large prison opening per year. Pentonville prison opened in 1842, beginning a trend of ever increasing incarceration rates and the use of prison as the primary form of crime punishment. Robert Peel's Gaols Act 1823 introduced regular visits to prisoners by chaplains, provided for the payment of jailers and prohibited the use of irons and manacles.

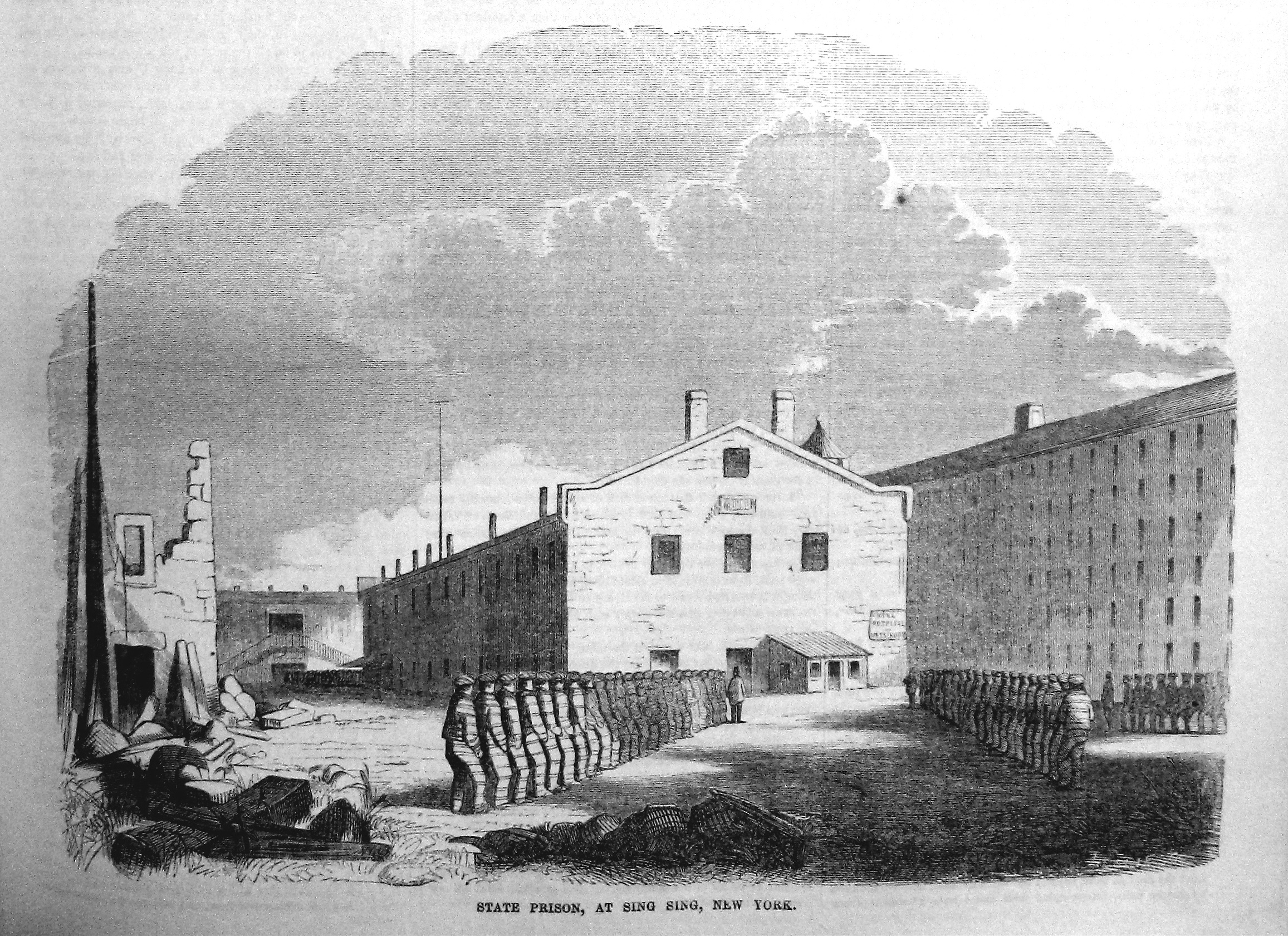
An 1855 engraving of New York's Sing Sing Penitentiary, which also followed the "Auburn (or Congregate) System", where prison cells were placed inside of rectangular buildings that lent themselves more to large-scale penal labor

In 1786, the state of Pennsylvania passed a law that mandated that all convicts who had not been sentenced to death would be placed in penal servitude to do public works projects such as building roads, forts, and mines. Besides the economic benefits of providing a free source of hard labor, the proponents of the new penal code also thought that this would deter criminal activity by making a conspicuous public example of consequences of breaking the law. However, what actually ended up happening was frequent spectacles of disorderly conduct by the convict work crews, and the generation of sympathetic feelings from the citizens who witnessed the mistreatment of the convicts. The laws quickly drew criticism from a humanitarian perspective (as cruel, exploitative and degrading) and from a utilitarian perspective (as failing to deter crime and delegitimizing the state in the eyes of the public). Reformers such as Benjamin Rush came up with a solution that would enable the continued use of forced labor while keeping disorderly conduct and abuse out of the eyes of the public. They suggested that prisoners be sent to secluded "houses of repentance" where they would be subjected (out of the view of the public) to "bodily pain, labor, watchfulness, solitude, and silence ... joined with cleanliness and a simple diet". (Note: There were several reasons that early prison reformers sought to move punishment out of the view of the public, by placing prisons away from population centers and restricting access to the inside of prison facilities. For a detailed history of the ideological origins of these practices of concealment and exclusion, see: Kann, Mark E. (2005). "Concealing Punishment". Punishment, Prisons, and Patriarchy: Liberty and Power in the Early American Republic. NYU Press. ISBN 978-0-8147-4783-4.)

Pennsylvania soon put this theory into practice and turned its old jail at Walnut Street in Philadelphia into a state prison in 1790. This prison was modeled on what became known as the "Pennsylvania system" (or "separate system") and placed all prisoners into solitary cells with nothing other than religious literature, made them wear prison uniforms, and forced them to be completely silent to reflect on their wrongs. New York soon built the Newgate state prison in Greenwich Village, which was modeled on the Pennsylvania system, and other states followed.

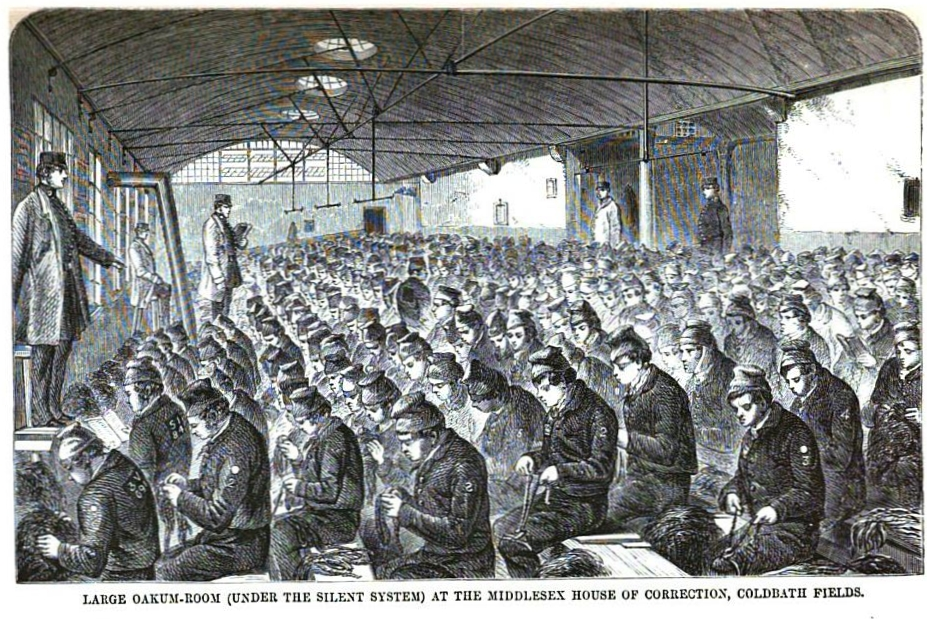
Prisoners picking oakum at Coldbath Fields Prison in London, c. 1864

But, by 1820, faith in the efficacy of legal reform had declined, as statutory changes had no discernible effect on the level of crime, and the prisons, where prisoners shared large rooms and booty including alcohol, had become riotous and prone to escapes. In response, New York developed the Auburn system in which prisoners were confined in separate cells and prohibited from talking when eating and working together, implementing it at Auburn State Prison and Sing Sing at Ossining. The aim of this was rehabilitative: the reformers talked about the penitentiary serving as a model for the family and the school and almost all the states adopted the plan (though Pennsylvania went even further in separating prisoners). The system's fame spread, and visitors to the U.S. to see the prisons included de Tocqueville who wrote Democracy in America as a result of his visit.

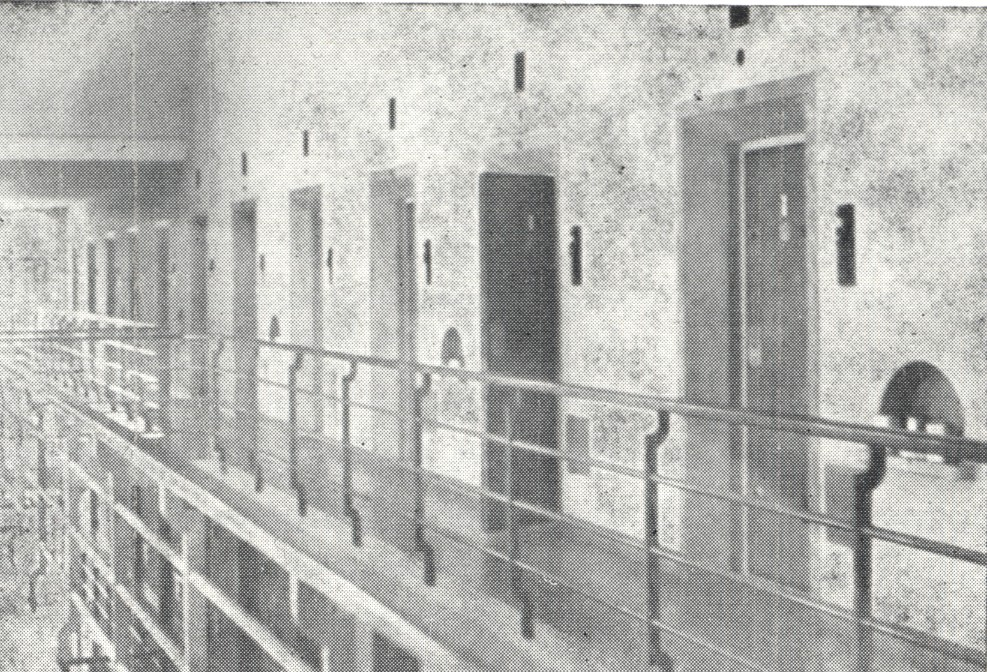
The cell section of Riihimäki Prison in 1944

The use of prisons in Continental Europe was never as popular as it became in the English-speaking world, although state prison systems were largely in place by the end of the 19th century in most European countries. After the unification of Italy in 1861, the government reformed the repressive and arbitrary prison system they inherited, and modernized and secularized criminal punishment by emphasizing discipline and deterrence. Italy developed an advanced penology under the leadership of Cesare Lombroso (1835–1909).

Another prominent prison reformer who made important contributions was Alexander Paterson who advocated for the necessity of humanizing and socializing methods within the prison system in Great Britain and America.

== Staff ==
Prisons employ people to run and maintain the prison while keeping control of the inmates. Oftentimes, the number of people employed within a prison depends upon factors such as the size of the prison, how many inmates the prison has, and how much funding the prison gets. Staff may include:

- The Warden, also known as a Governor, is the official who is in charge of the prison and heads all the staff.
- Security staff, also known as prison guards or corrections officers, are enforcement officials who are in charge of enforcing prison rules among the inmates. Thus they are responsible for the care, custody and control of the prison.
- Teachers are employed to provide education, which inmates often use after their release, and reduces the likelihood of reoffending and recidivism.
- Case managers are people who perform correctional casework in an institutional setting; they develop, evaluate, and analyze program needs and other data about inmates; evaluate progress of individual offenders in the institution; coordinate and integrate inmate training programs; develop social histories; evaluate positive and negative aspects in each case situation; and develop release plans.
- Prison counselors are people who are employed to intervene therapeutically with various clients, the majority of whom happen to be offenders. These interventions include prison adjustment, prerelease and postrelease vocational and marital/family readjustment, and work with adolescent adjustment problems.
- Medical workers are doctors, clinicians and nurses who are tasked with providing the inmates with healthcare, including mental health care.
- A work release supervisor is someone who is tasked with monitoring inmates outside of the prison during a work release program.
- In private prisons, contractors are people who pay the prison for the use of prison labor and supplied the prisoners with work.
- Prisons may also provide religious workers to meet the religious need for inmates. Religious workers are also in charge of the weddings when inmates marry someone outside the prison.
- In addition to the prison staff, inmate labor may be utilized for tasks within the prison, such as cooking food for the other inmates or providing cleaning services.

== Design and architecture ==
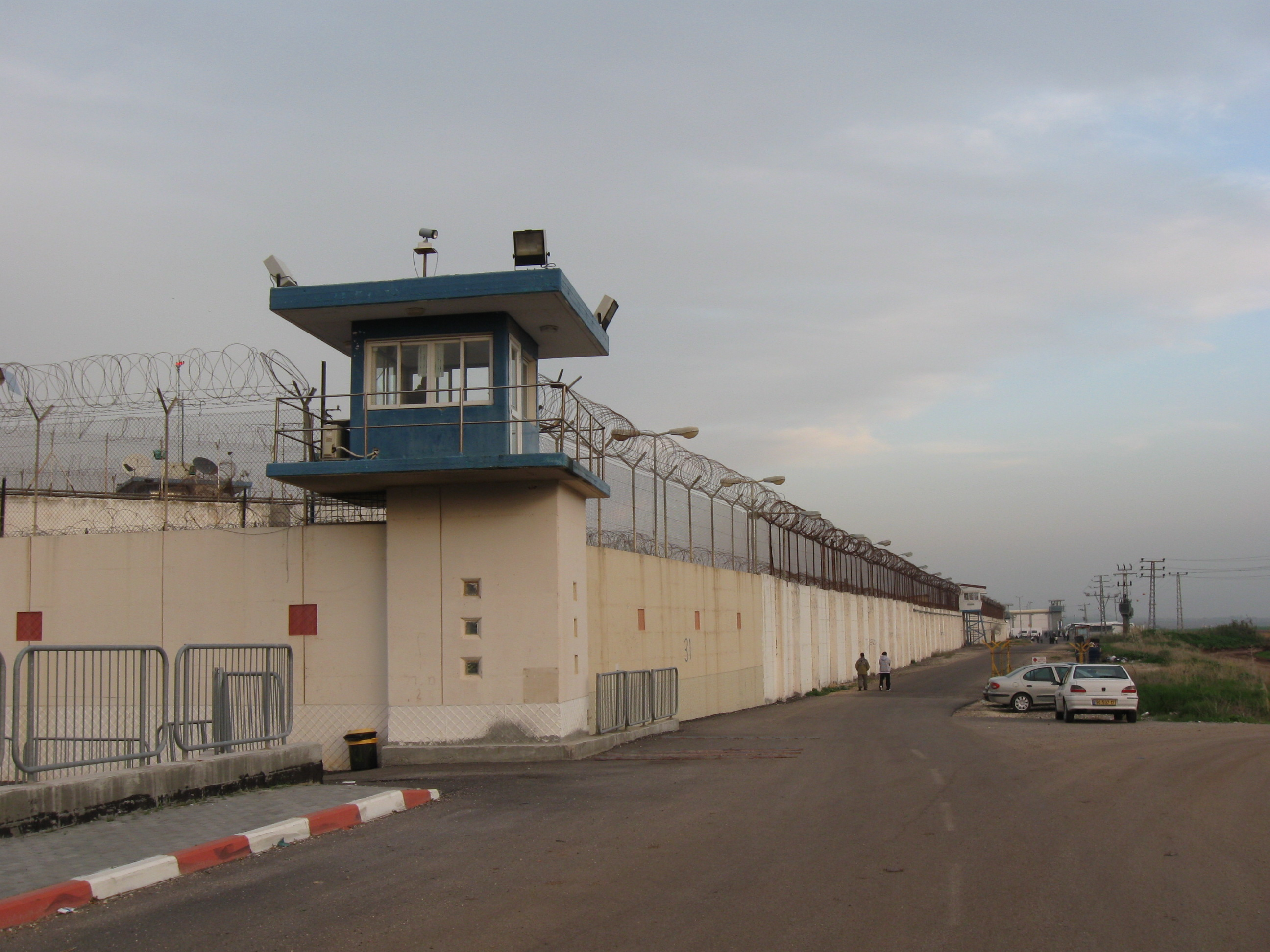
Shita (Shata) Prison in Israel. Many modern prisons are surrounded by a perimeter of high walls, razor wire or barbed wire, motion sensors and guard towers in order to prevent prisoners from escaping.

=== Security ===
Prisons are normally surrounded by fencing, walls, earthworks, geographical features, or other barriers to prevent escape. Multiple barriers, concertina wire, electrified fencing, secured and defensible main gates, armed guard towers, security lighting, motion sensors, dogs and roving patrols may all also be present depending on the level of security.

Remotely controlled doors, CCTV monitoring, alarms, cages, restraints, nonlethal and lethal weapons, riot-control gear and physical segregation of units and prisoners may all also be present within a prison to monitor and control the movement and activity of prisoners within the facility. (Note: For a broad overview of the technologies used in prison security, see: Latessa, Edward J. (1996). "Technology". In McShane, Marilyn D.; Williams, Frank P. (eds.). Encyclopedia Of American Prisons. Taylor & Francis. ISBN 978-1-135-58270-8.)

Design of a cell at ADX Florence

Modern prison designs have increasingly sought to restrict and control the movement of prisoners throughout the facility and also to allow a smaller prison staff to monitor prisoners directly, often using a decentralized "podular" layout. (In comparison, 19th-century prisons had large landings and cell blocks which permitted only intermittent observation of prisoners.) Smaller, separate and self-contained housing units known as "pods" or "modules" are designed to hold 16 to 50 prisoners and are arranged around exercise yards or support facilities in a decentralized "campus" pattern. A few correctional officers, or sometimes only one, supervise each pod. The pods contain tiers of cells arranged around a central control station or desk from which a single officer can monitor a majority of the cells and pod, control cell doors and communicate with the rest of the prison.

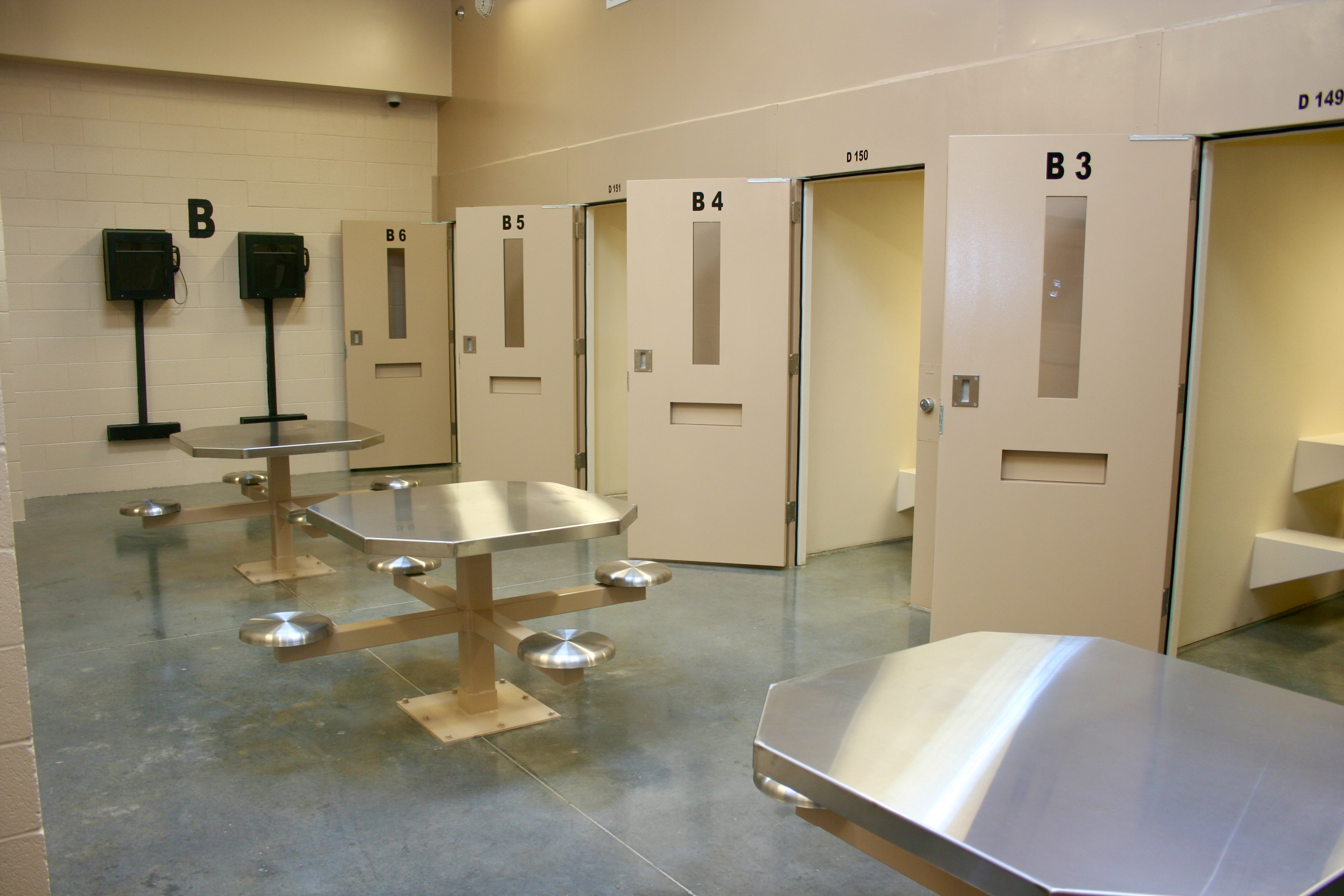
Cells at a modern prison in the United States

Pods may be designed for high-security "indirect supervision", in which officers in segregated and sealed control booths monitor smaller numbers of prisoners confined to their cells. An alternative is "direct supervision", in which officers work within the pod and directly interact with and supervise prisoners, who may spend the day outside their cells in a central "dayroom" on the floor of the pod. Movement in or out of the pod to and from exercise yards, work assignments or medical appointments can be restricted to individual pods at designated times and is generally centrally controlled. Goods and services, such as meals, laundry, commissary, educational materials, religious services and medical care can increasingly be brought to individual pods or cells as well. Some modern prisons may exclude certain inmates from the general population, usually for safety reasons, such as those within solitary confinement, celebrities, political figures, former law enforcement officers, those convicted of sexual crimes and/or crimes against children, or those on the medical wing or protective custody.

==== Inmate security classifications ====
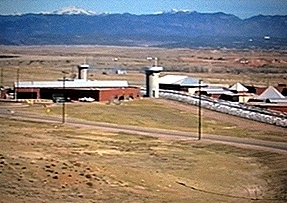
ADX Florence is presently the only facility housing supermax units operating in the Federal Bureau of Prisons.

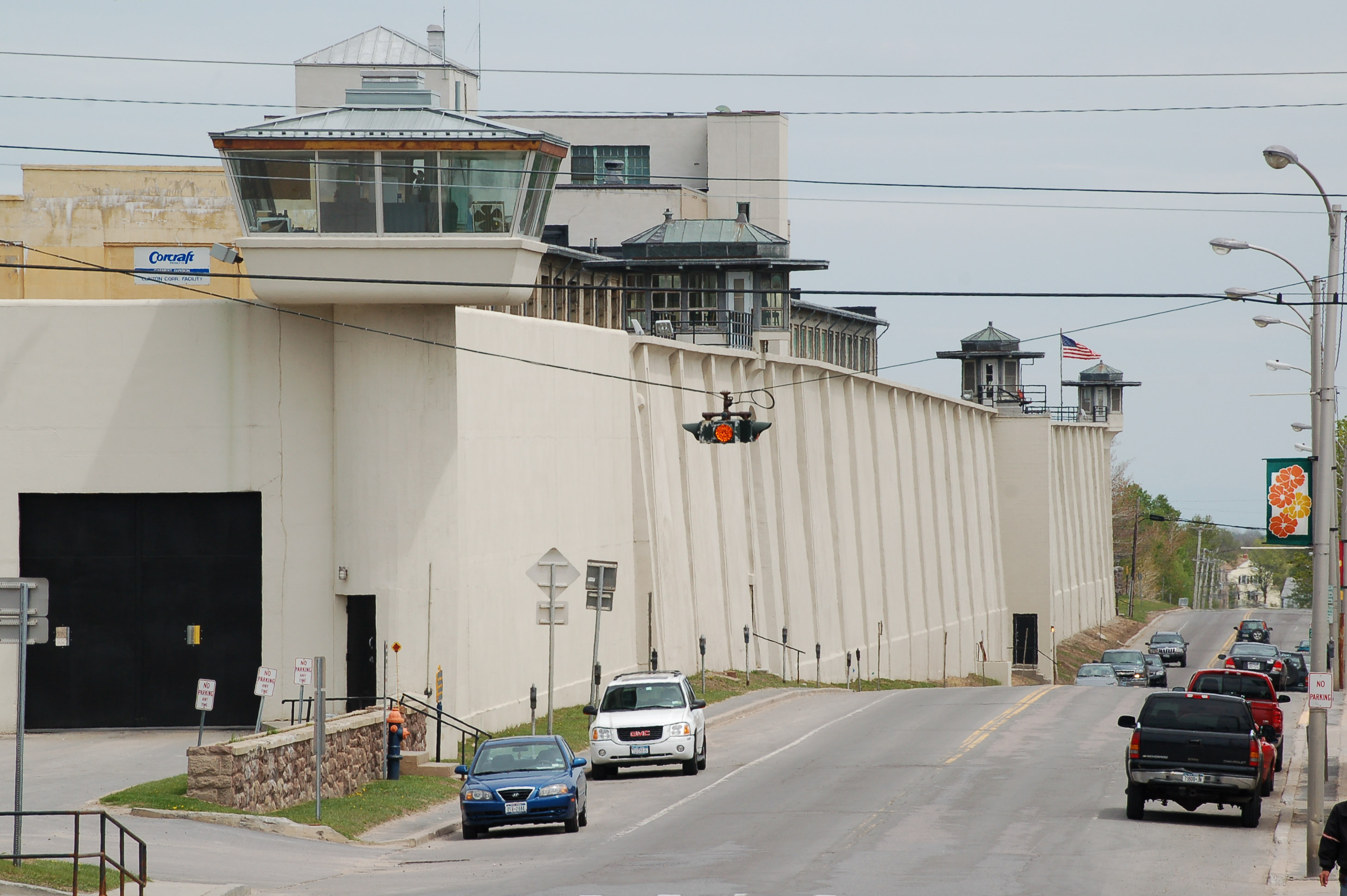
A maximum security prison, the Clinton Correctional Facility, in Dannemora, New York

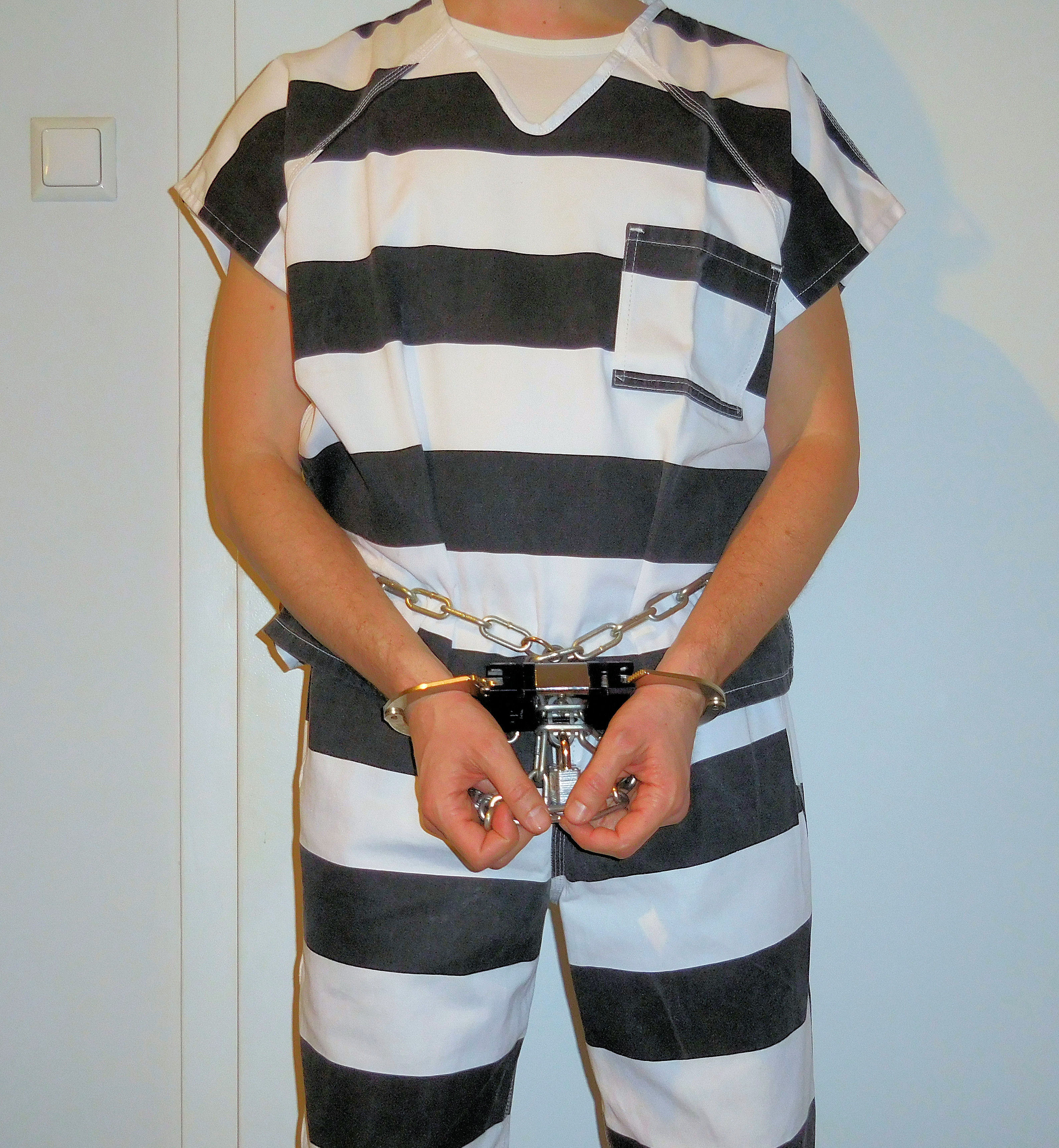
Inmate in striped prison uniform and restraints

Generally, when an inmate arrives at a prison, they go through a security classification screening and risk assessment that determines where they will be placed within the prison system. Classifications are assigned by assessing the prisoner's personal history, criminal record, escape potential and through subjective determinations made by intake personnel (which include mental health workers, counselors, clerical staff, sheriff deputies, prison unit managers, and others). This process will have a major impact on the prisoner's experience, determining their security level, educational and work programs, mental health status (e.g. the determination of whether they will be placed in a mental health unit), and many other factors. This sorting of prisoners is one of the fundamental techniques through which the prison administration maintains control over the inmate population and attempts to reduce risks and liabilities by creating an orderly and secure prison environment. In some countries, prisoners are made to wear a prison uniform and are stripped of nearly all personal possessions, with the exception of approved medical devices like glasses.

The levels of security within a prison system are categorized differently around the world, but tend to follow a distinct pattern. At one end of the spectrum are the most secure facilities ("maximum security"), which typically hold prisoners that are considered dangerous, disruptive or likely to try to escape. Furthermore, in recent times, supermax prisons have been created where the custody level goes beyond maximum security for people such as terrorists or political prisoners deemed a threat to national security, and inmates from other prisons who have a history of violent or other disruptive behavior in prison or are suspected of gang affiliation. These inmates have individual cells and are kept in lockdown, often for more than 23 hours per day. Meals are served through "chuck-holes" in the cell door, and each inmate is allowed one hour of outdoor exercise per day, alone. They are normally permitted no contact with other inmates and are under constant surveillance via closed-circuit television cameras.

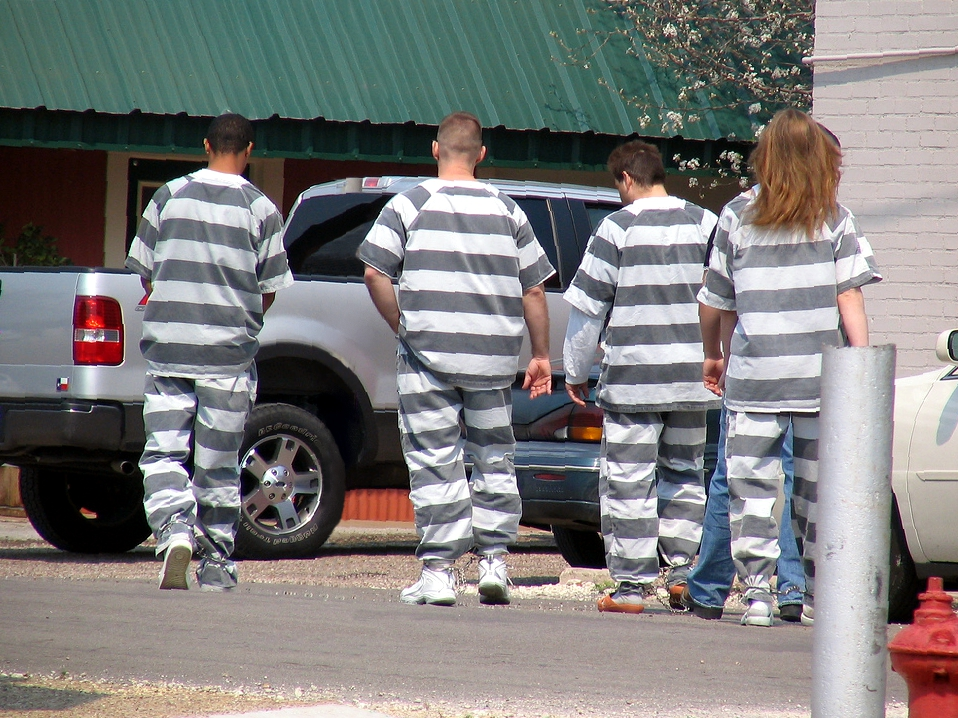
A minimum security prison in the U.S.

On the other end are "minimum security" prisons which are most often used to house those for whom more stringent security is deemed unnecessary. For example, prisoners convicted of white-collar crime (which rarely results in incarceration) are almost always sent to minimum-security prisons due to them having committed nonviolent crimes. Lower-security prisons are often designed with less restrictive features, confining prisoners at night in smaller locked dormitories or even cottage or cabin-like housing while permitting them free movement around the grounds to work or partake in activities during the day. Some countries (such as Great Britain) also have "open" prisons where prisoners are allowed home-leave or part-time employment outside of the prison. Suomenlinna prison in Finland is an example of one such "open" correctional facility. The prison has been open since 1971 and, as of September 2013, the facility's 95 male prisoners leave the prison grounds on a daily basis to work in the corresponding township or commute to the mainland for either work or study. Prisoners can rent flat-screen televisions, sound systems, and mini-refrigerators with the prison-labor wages that they can earn—wages range between 4.10 and €7.30 per hour. With electronic monitoring, prisoners are also allowed to visit their families in Helsinki and eat together with the prison staff. Prisoners in Scandinavian facilities are permitted to wear their own clothes.

There are fundamental differences between the security level of men's prisons and that of women's prisons. Male prisons tend to have higher, or more severe, security levels/classifications than female prisons. This is even noticeable when comparing the construction and design of male prisons which tend to have very tall walls and towers, barbed wire and other serious security measures whereas these types of high level security measures are absent at many female prisons. This is due to multiple factors, including females being convicted of less severe offences and being less likely to be convicted of violent offences, in comparison to males, and due to female prisoners being less likely to be violent than male prisoners.

=== Common facilities ===
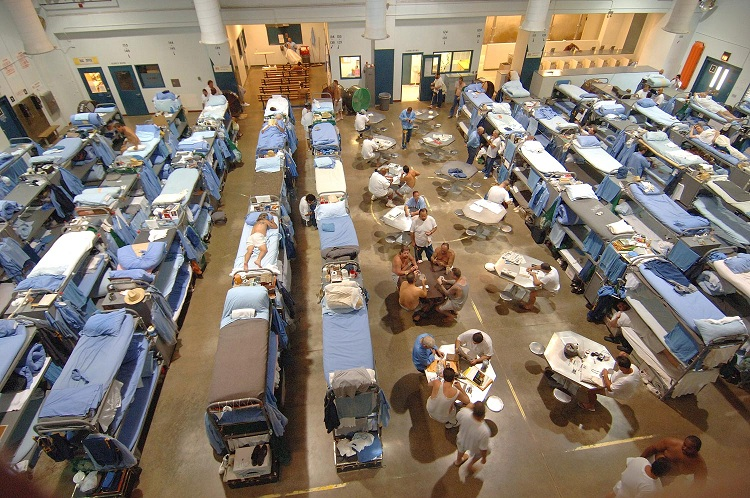
The crowded living quarters of San Quentin State Prison in California, in January 2006. As a result of overcrowding in the California state prison system, the United States Supreme Court ordered California to reduce its prison population (the second largest in the nation, after Texas).

Modern prisons often hold hundreds or thousands of inmates and must have facilities onsite to meet most of their needs, including dietary, health, fitness, education, religious practices, entertainment, and many others. Conditions in prisons vary widely around the world, and the types of facilities within prisons depend on many intersecting factors including funding, legal requirements, and cultural beliefs/practices. Nevertheless, in addition to the cell blocks that contain the prisoners, there are also certain auxiliary facilities that are common in prisons throughout the world.

==== Kitchen and dining ====
Prisons generally have to provide food for a large number of individuals and thus are generally equipped with a large institutional kitchen. There are many security considerations, however, that are unique to the prison dining environment. For instance, cutlery equipment must be very carefully monitored and accounted for at all times, and the layout of prison kitchens must be designed in a way that allows staff to observe activity of the kitchen staff (who are usually prisoners). The quality of kitchen equipment varies from prison to prison, depending on when the prison was constructed and the level of funding available to procure new equipment. Prisoners are often served food in a large cafeteria with rows of tables and benches that are securely attached to the floor. However, inmates that are locked in control units or prisons that are on "lockdown" (where prisoners are made to remain in their cells all day) have trays of food brought to their cells and served through "chuck-holes" in the cell door. Prison food in many developed countries is nutritionally adequate for most inmates.

==== Healthcare ====
Prisons in wealthy, industrialized nations provide medical care for most of their inmates. Additionally, prison medical staff play a major role in monitoring, organizing, and controlling the prison population through the use of psychiatric evaluations and interventions (psychiatric drugs, isolation in mental health units, etc.). Prison populations are largely from poor minority communities that experience greater rates of chronic illness, substance abuse, and mental illness than the general population. This leads to a high demand for medical services, and in countries such as the US that do not provide tax-payer funded healthcare, prison is often the first place that people are able to receive medical treatment (which they could not afford outside).

Some prison medical facilities include primary care, mental health services, dental care, substance abuse treatment, and other forms of specialized care, depending on the needs of the inmate population and the willingness of the prison to provide for these needs. Health care services in many prisons have long been criticized as inadequate, underfunded, and understaffed, and many prisoners have experienced abuse and mistreatment at the hands of prison medical staff who are entrusted with their care.

In the United States, a million incarcerated people suffer from mental illness without any assistance or treatment for their condition. The tendency of a convicted criminal to reoffend, known as the rate of recidivism, is unusually high for those with the most serious disorders. Analysis of data in 2000 from several forensic hospitals in California, New York and Oregon found that with treatment the rate of recidivism was "much lower" than for untreated mentally ill offenders.

==== Library and educational facilities ====
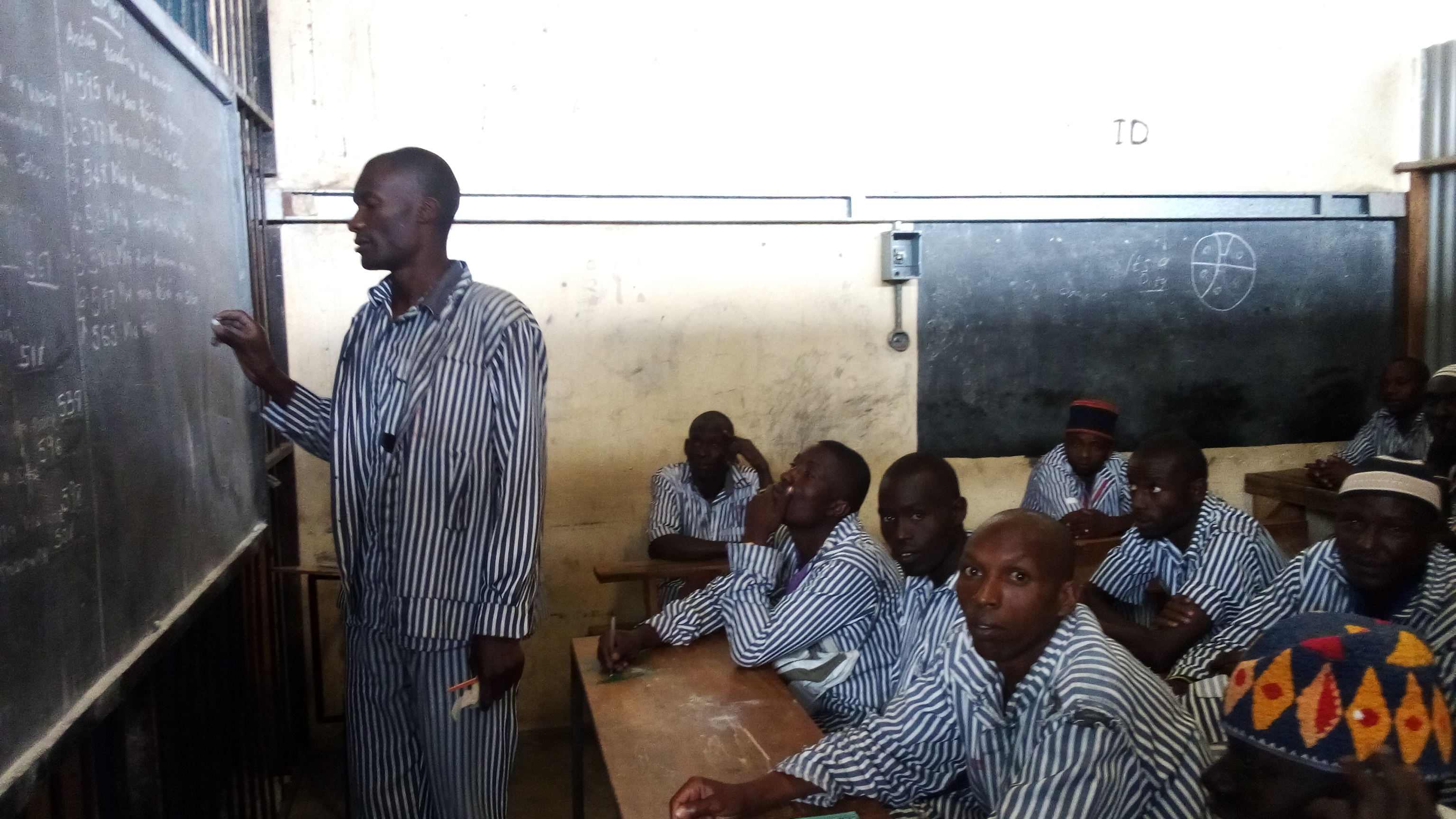
Inmate teaching other inmates in Kenya

Some prisons provide educational programs for inmates that can include basic literacy, secondary education, or even college education. Prisoners seek education for a variety of reasons, including the development of skills for after release, personal enrichment and curiosity, finding something to fill their time, or trying to please prison staff (which can often secure early release for good behavior). However, the educational needs of prisoners often come into conflict with the security concerns of prison staff and with a public that wants to be "tough on crime" (and thus supports denying prisoners access to education). Whatever their reasons for participating in educational programs, prison populations tend to have very low literacy rates and lack of basic mathematical skills, and many have not completed secondary education. This lack of basic education severely limits their employment opportunities outside of prison, leading to high rates of recidivism. Research has shown that prison education can play a significant role in helping prisoners reorient their lives and become successful after reentry.

Many prisons also provide a library where prisoners can check out books or do legal research for their cases. (Note: For a history of the development of prison libraries, see Coyle, William (1987). Libraries in Prisons: A Blending of Institutions. Greenwood Publishing Group. ISBN 978-0-313-24769-9. and Wiegand, Wayne A.; Davis, Donald G., eds. (1994). "Prison libraries". Encyclopedia of Library History. Routledge. ISBN 978-0-8240-5787-9.) Often these libraries are very small, consisting of a few shelves of books. In some countries, such as the United States, drastic budget cuts have resulted in many prison libraries being shut down. Meanwhile, many nations that have historically lacked prison libraries are starting to develop them. Prison libraries can dramatically improve the quality of life for prisoners, who have large amounts of empty time on their hands that can be occupied with reading. This time spent reading has a variety of benefits including improved literacy, ability to understand rules and regulations (leading to improved behavior), ability to read books that encourage self-reflection and analysis of one's emotional state, consciousness of important real-world events, and education that can lead to successful re-entry into society after release.

In 2024, the American Library Association published Standards for Library Services for the Incarcerated or Detained.

==== Literacy programs ====
Under the Federal Bureau of Prisons in the United States, all prison institutions offer literacy programs to expand inmates' educational opportunities. Some scholars in the field see prison literacy programs as organic, tactical spaces that resist institutionalization. They warn against the dehumanizing nature of rehabilitative practices and encourage the maintenance of agency and control in these programs to prevent them from becoming self-serving entities that cause further exploitation. Others argue that certain education systems are falsely advertised as a perfect solution when in reality there are much larger systemic issues at hand. Rather than trying to shape inmates into helpful workforce members upon release, scholars like Michael Sutcliffe argue that there needs to be a focus on re-enfranchising members and helping them share their voices. Still others advocate for styles of collective life-writing to capture the experience of incarcerated individuals and fight against exclusionary institutions. Taking an alternative approach, queer literacy frameworks have also been supported by scholars like Alexandra Cavallaro who see the incorporation of LGBTQ individuals' stories as key to promoting lifelong learning. Keeping forward solutions in mind, rhetorical listening is a final approach that is spread by leaders like Wendy Hinshaw.

==== Recreation and fitness ====
Many prisons provide limited recreational and fitness facilities for prisoners. The provision of these services is controversial, with certain elements of society claiming that prisons are being "soft" on inmates, and others claiming that it is cruel and dehumanizing to confine people for years without any recreational opportunities. The tension between these two opinions, coupled with lack of funding, leads to a large variety of different recreational procedures at different prisons. Prison administrators, however, generally find the provision of recreational opportunities to be useful at maintaining order in the prisons, because it keeps prisoners occupied and provides leverage to gain compliance (by depriving prisoners of recreation as punishment). Examples of common facilities/programs that are available in some prisons are: gyms and weightlifting rooms, arts and crafts, games (such as cards, chess, or bingo), television sets, and sports teams. Additionally, many prisons have an outdoor recreation area, commonly referred to as an "exercise yard".

==== Control units ====
Most prisoners are part of the "general population" (or "gen pop") of the prison, members of which are generally able to socialize with each other in common areas of the prison. A control unit or segregation unit (also called a "block" or "isolation cell") is a highly secure area of the prison, where inmates are placed in solitary confinement to isolate them from the general population. Other prisoners that are often segregated from the general population include those who are in protective custody, or who are on suicide watch, and those whose behavior presents a threat to other prisoners.

==== Other facilities ====
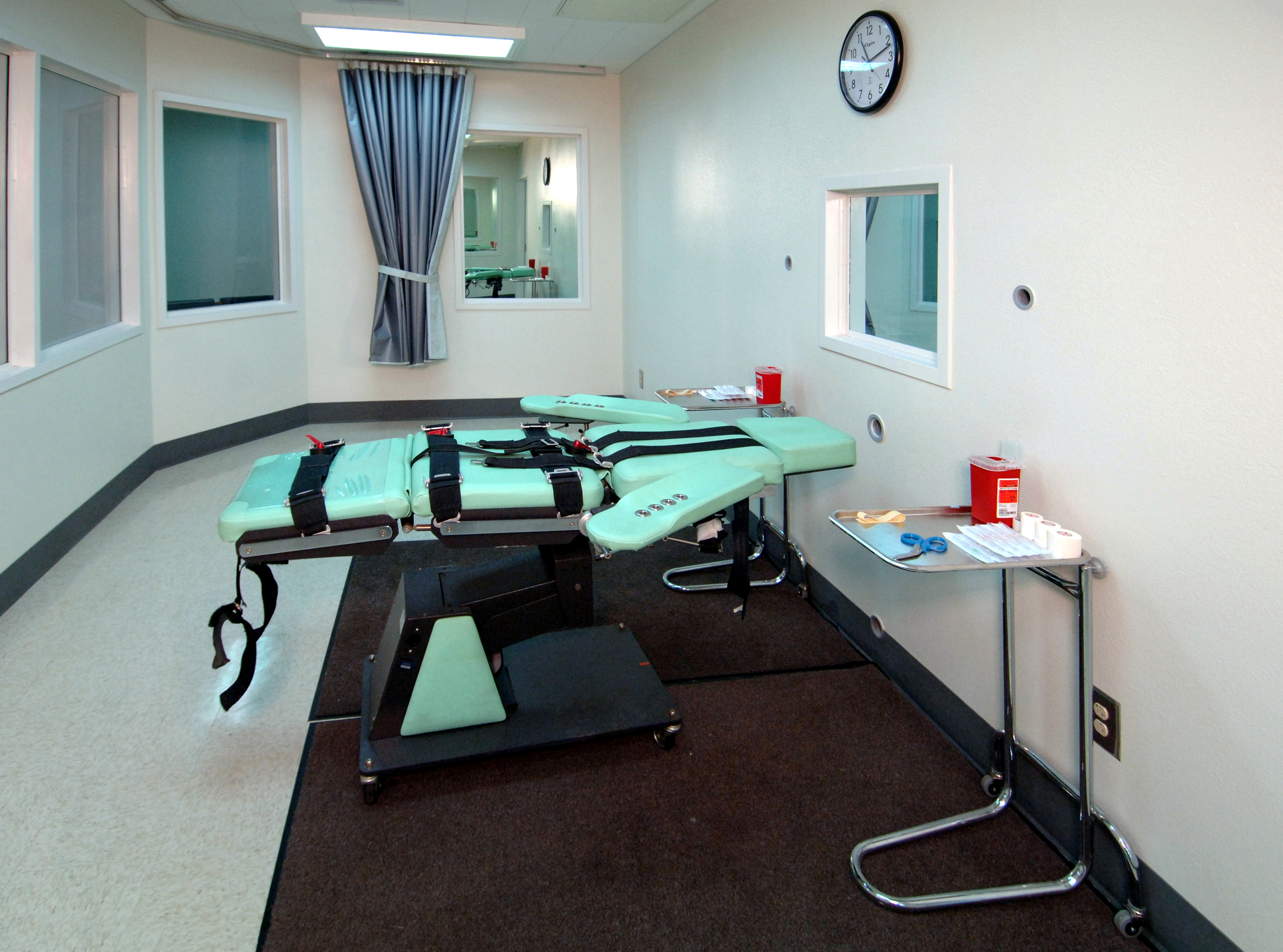
In countries where capital punishment is practiced, such as the United States, some prisons are equipped with a "death row", where prisoners are held prior to their executions, as well as an execution chamber, where they are put to death under controlled conditions. Pictured here is the lethal injection room at San Quentin Prison, c. 2010.

In addition to the above facilities, others that are common include prison factories and workshops, visiting areas, mail rooms, telephone and computer rooms, a prison store (often called a "canteen") where prisoners can purchase goods with prison commissary. Some prisons have a death row where prisoners who have been sentenced to death await execution and an execution room, where the death sentence is carried out. In places like Singapore and Malaysia, there is place for corporal punishment (carried out by caning).

== Special types ==
=== Youth detention facilities ===
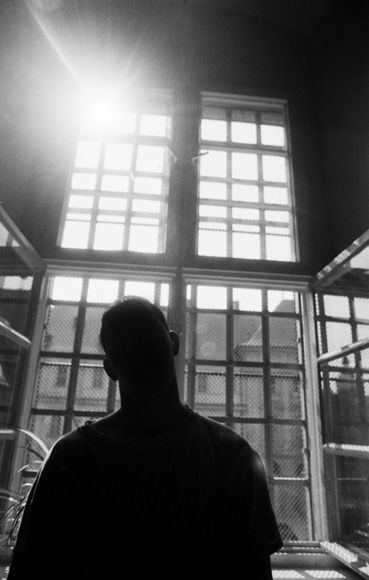
Juvenile prison in Germany

Prisons for juveniles are known by a variety of names, including "youth detention facilities", "juvenile detention centers", and "reformatories". The purpose of youth detention facilities is to keep young offenders away from the public while working towards rehabilitation. The idea of separately treating youthful and adult offenders is a relatively modern idea. The earliest known use of the term "juvenile delinquency" was in London in 1816, from where it quickly spread to the United States. The first juvenile correctional institution in the United States opened in 1825 in New York City. By 1917, juvenile courts had been established in all but 3 states. It was estimated that in 2011 more than 95,000 juveniles were locked up in prisons and jails in the United States (the largest youth prisoner population in the world). Besides prisons, many other types of residential placement exist within juvenile justice systems, including youth homes, community-based programs, training schools and boot camps.

Like adult facilities, youth detention centers in some countries are experiencing overcrowding due to large increases in incarceration rates of young offenders. Crowding can create extremely dangerous environments in juvenile detention centers and juvenile correctional facilities. Overcrowding may also lead to the decrease in availability to provide the youth with much needed and promised programs and services while they are in the facility. Many times the administration is not prepared to handle the large number of residents, and therefore the facilities can become unstable and create instability in simple logistics.

In addition to overcrowding, juvenile prisons are questioned for their overall effectiveness in rehabilitating youth. Many critics note high juvenile recidivism rates, and the fact that most of the youths that are incarcerated are those from lower socio-economic classes (who often suffer from broken families, lack of educational/job opportunities, and violence in their communities).

=== Women's prisons ===
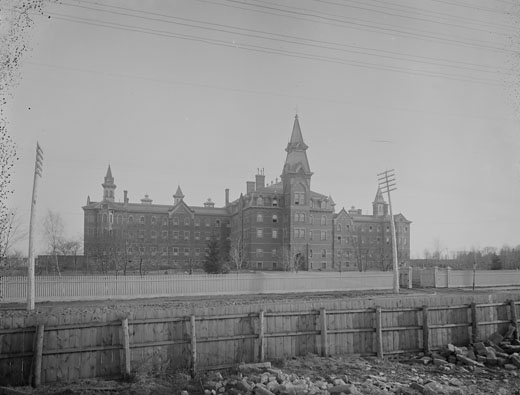
Mercer Reformatory (Toronto, Canada), which opened in 1874 and was Canada's first dedicated prison for women. The reformatory was closed in 1969 due to an abuse scandal.

In the 19th century, a growing awareness that female prisoners had different needs to male prisoners led to the establishment of dedicated prisons for women. In modern times, it is the norm for female inmates to be housed in either a separate prison or a separate wing of a unisex prison. The aim is to protect them from physical and sexual abuse that would otherwise occur.

The guards of women's prisons are usually female, though not always. For example, in federal women's correction facilities of the United States, 70% of guards are male. Rape and sexual offenses remain commonplace in many women's prisons and are usually underreported. Two studies in the late 2000s noted that because a high proportion of female inmates have experienced sexual abuse in the past (40-57%), they are particularly vulnerable to further abuse.

The needs of mothers during pregnancy and childbirth often conflict with the demands of the prison system. The Rebecca Project, a non-profit organization that campaigns for women's rights issues, reports that "In 2007, the Bureau of Justice Statistics stated that, on average, 5% of women who enter into state prisons are pregnant and in jails [local prisons] 6% of women are pregnant". The standard of care that female prisoners receive before and after giving birth is often far worse than the standard expected by the general population, and sometimes almost none is given. In some countries, female prisoners may be restrained while giving birth. In many countries, including the United States, mothers will frequently be separated from their baby after giving birth.

Research has shown a significant link between females in prison and brain injury which supports research that shows incarcerated females are overwhelmingly victims of domestic violence (mainly male violence against women).

=== Military prisons and prisoner-of-war camps ===
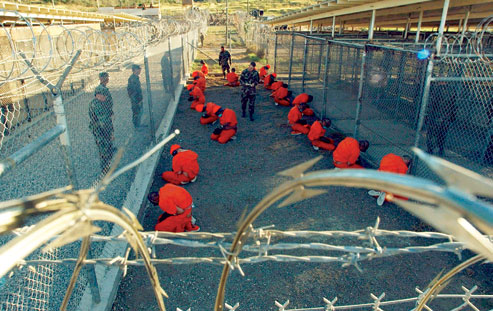
Captives at Camp X-Ray, Guantanamo Bay, Cuba, a United States military prison where people are being indefinitely detained in solitary confinement as part of the "war on terror" (January 2002). The prisoners are forced to wear goggles and headphones for sensory deprivation and to prevent them from communicating with other prisoners.

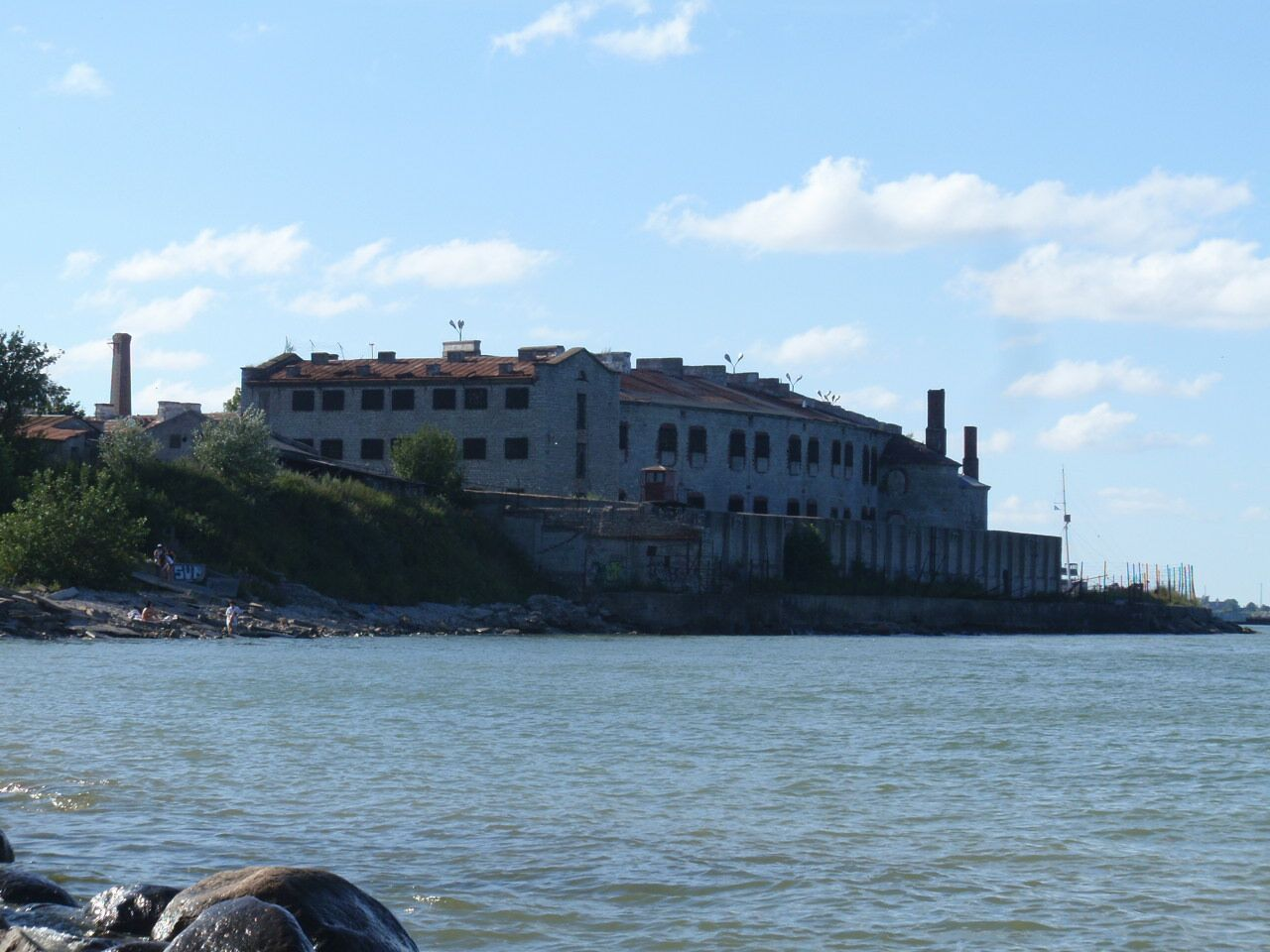
The Patarei Sea Fortress, known as the notorious Soviet-era prison, in Tallinn, Estonia

Prisons have formed parts of military systems since the French Revolution. France set up its system in 1796. They were modernized in 1852 and, since their existence, are used variously to house prisoners of war, unlawful combatants, those whose freedom is deemed a national security risk by military or civilian authorities, and members of the military found guilty of a serious crime. Military prisons in the United States have also been converted to civilian prisons; for example, Alcatraz Island. Alcatraz was formerly a military prison for soldiers during the American Civil War.

In the American Revolution, British prisoners held by the U.S. were assigned to local farmers as laborers. The British kept American sailors in broken down ship hulls with high death rates.

In the Napoleonic wars, the broken down hulks were still in use for naval prisoners. One French surgeon recalled his captivity in Spain, where scurvy, diarrhea, dysentery, and typhus abounded, and prisoners died by the thousands:

"These great trunks of ships were immense coffins, in which living men were consigned to a slow death.... [In the hot weather we had] black army bread full of gritty particles, biscuit full of maggots, salt meat that was already decomposing, rancid lard, spoiled cod, [and] stale rice, peas, and beans."

In the American Civil War, at first prisoners of war were released after they promised not to fight again unless formally exchanged. When the Confederacy refused to exchange black prisoners, the system broke down and each side built large-scale POW camps. Conditions in terms of housing, food, and medical care were bad in the Confederacy, and the Union retaliated by imposing harsh conditions.

By 1900, the legal framework of the Geneva and Hague Convention provided considerable protection. In the First World War, millions of prisoners were held on both sides, with no major atrocities. Officers received privileged treatment. There was an increase in the use of forced labor throughout Europe. Food and medical treatment were generally comparable to what active duty soldiers received, and housing was much better than front-line conditions.

=== Political prisons and administrative detention ===
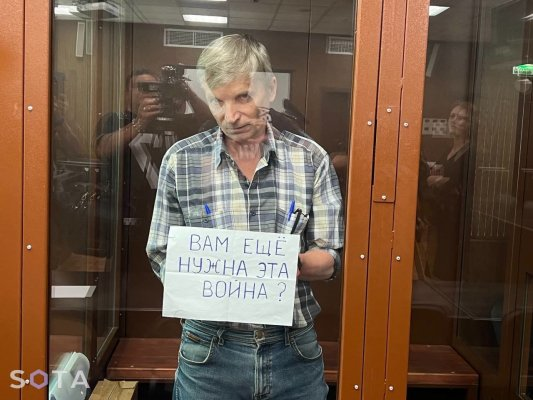
Alexei Gorinov, a Moscow municipal deputy, was sentenced to seven years in prison in 2022 under Russia's wartime censorship laws for opposing the Russian invasion of Ukraine.

Political prisoners are people who have been imprisoned because of their political beliefs, activities and affiliations. There is much debate about who qualifies as a "political prisoner". The category of "political prisoner" is often contested, and many regimes that incarcerate political prisoners often claim that they are merely "criminals". Others who are sometimes classified as "political prisoners" include prisoners who were politicized in prison and are subsequently punished for their involvement with political causes. (Note: For a detailed discussion of the sometimes blurred line between "criminals" and "political prisoners", see: Wachsmann, Nikolaus (2004). Hitler's Prisons: Legal Terror in Nazi Germany. Yale University Press. ISBN 978-0-300-10250-5.)

Many countries maintain or have in the past had a system of prisons specifically intended for political prisoners. In some countries, dissidents can be detained, tortured, executed, and/or "disappeared" without trial. This can happen either legally or extralegally (sometimes by falsely accusing people and fabricating evidence against them).

Administrative detention is a classification of prisons or detention centers where people are held without trial.

=== Psychiatric facilities ===
Some psychiatric facilities have characteristics of prisons, particularly when confining patients who have committed a crime and are considered dangerous. In addition, many prisons have psychiatric units dedicated to housing offenders diagnosed with a wide variety of mental disorders. The United States government refers to psychiatric prisons housing federal inmates as "Federal Medical Centers (FMC)".

== Prison population ==
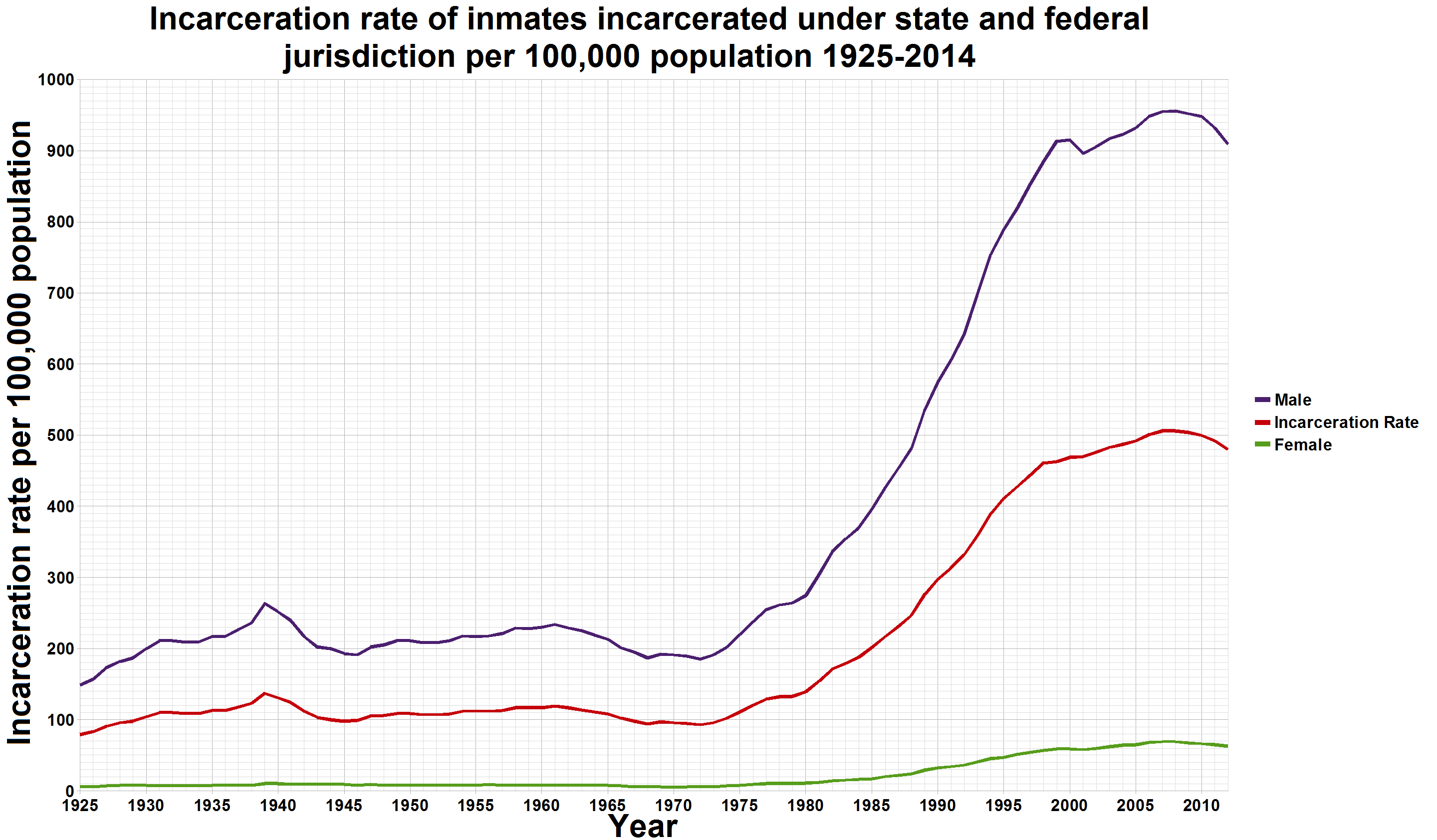
A graph showing the incarceration rate per 100,000 population in the United States. The rapid rise in the rate of imprisonment in the United States came in response to the declaration of a war on drugs: nearly half of those incarcerated in the United States are sentenced to prison for violating drug prohibition laws.

Some jurisdictions refer to the prison population (total or per-prison) as the "prison muster".

In 2021, the World Prison Brief reported that at least 11.5 million people were imprisoned worldwide.

In 2021, the United States of America had the world's largest prison population, with over 2 million people in American prisons or jails—up from 744,000 in 1985—making 1 in every 200 American adults a prisoner. In 2017, the nonprofit organization Prison Policy Initiative estimated that the United States government spent an estimated US$80.7 billion to maintain prisons. CNBC estimated that the cost of maintaining the US prison system was US$74 billion per year. (Note: For a detailed look at the demographics of the U.S. prison population, see Simon, Rita; de Waal, Christiaan (2009). "United States". Prisons the World Over. Rowman & Littlefield. ISBN 978-0-7391-4024-6.) This increases government spending on prisons. As of 2023, the US no longer has the highest incarceration rate in the world, with El Salvador now having the highest.

Not all countries have experienced a rise in prison population: Sweden closed four prisons in 2013 due to a significant drop in the number of inmates. The head of Sweden's prison and probation services characterized the decrease in the number of Swedish prisoners as "out-of-the-ordinary", with prison numbers in Sweden falling by around 1% a year since 2004.

The United Nations Office on Drugs and Crime website hosts data regarding prison populations around the world, including "Persons held – by sex, by age group," "Persons held – by status and sex" and "Prison capacity and overcrowding – totals".

Prison capacity

Prison population rate

== Economics of prisons ==
In the United States alone, more than $74 billion per year is spent on prisons, with over 800,000 people employed in the prison industry. As the prison population grows, revenues increase for a variety of small and large businesses that construct facilities and provide equipment (security systems, furniture, clothing) and services (transportation, communications, healthcare, food) for prisons. These parties have a strong interest in the expansion of the prison system since their development and prosperity directly depends on the number of inmates.

The prison industry also includes private businesses that benefit from the exploitation of the prison labor. Some scholars, using the term prison-industrial complex, have argued that the trend of "hiring out prisoners" is a continuation of the slavery tradition, pointing out that the Thirteenth Amendment to the United States Constitution freed slaves but allowed forced labor for people convicted of crimes. Prisons are very attractive to employers, because prisoners can be made to perform a great array of jobs under conditions that most free laborers would not accept (and would be illegal outside of prisons): sub-minimum wage payments, no insurance, no collective bargaining, lack of alternative options, etc. Prison labor can soon deprive the free labor of jobs in a number of sectors, since the organized labor turns out to be uncompetitive compared to the prison counterpart.

Additionally people imprisoned afterward have lower earnings on average. People who have spent time in prison suffer the greatest losses, with their subsequent annual earnings reduced by an average of 52 percent. People convicted of a felony but not imprisoned for it see their annual earnings reduced by an average of 22 percent. People convicted of a misdemeanor see their annual earnings reduced by an average of 16 percent.

== Social effects ==
=== Internal ===
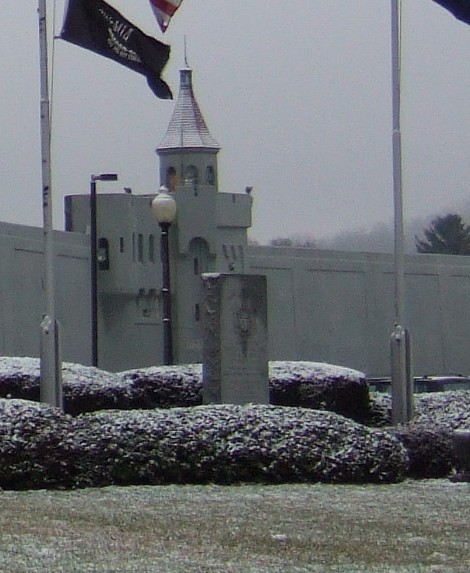
Memorial to the prison staff who died in the 1971 riot at Attica Correctional Facility

Prisons can be difficult places to live and work in, even in developed countries in the present day. By their very definition, prisons house individuals who may be prone to violence and rule-breaking. It is also typical that a high proportion of inmates have mental health concerns. A 2014 US report found that this included 64% of local jail inmates, 54% of state prisoners and 45% of federal prisoners. The environment may be worsened by overcrowding, poor sanitation and maintenance, violence by prisoners against other prisoners or staff, staff misconduct, prison gangs, self-harm, and the widespread smuggling of illegal drugs and other contraband. The social system within the prison commonly develops an "inmate code", an informal set of internal values and rules that govern prison life and relationships, but that may be at odds with the interests of prison management or external society, compromising future rehabilitation and increasing recidivism rates. In some cases, disorder can escalate into a full-scale prison riot, which could lead to serious injury or death en masse. Academic research has found that poor conditions tend to increase the likelihood of violence within prisons. For example according to (Gaes and McGuire study), as social density increased by 1% in prisons, violence increased about 0.3%.

=== External ===
Prisoners can face difficulty re-integrating back into society upon their release. They often have difficulty finding work, earn less money when they do find work, and experience a wide range of medical and psychological issues. Many countries have a high recidivism rate. According to the Bureau of Justice Statistics, 67.8% of released prisoners in the United States are rearrested within three years and 76.6% are rearrested within five years. If the prisoner has a family, they are likely to suffer socially and economically from the prisoner's absence.

If a society has a very high imprisonment rate, these effects become noticeable not just on family units but also on entire poor communities or communities of color. The expensive cost of maintaining a high imprisonment rate also costs money that must come at the expense of either the taxpayer or other government agencies.

== Theories of punishment and criminality ==
A variety of justifications and explanations are put forth for why people are imprisoned by the state. The most common of these are:

- Rehabilitation: (Note: Also frequently referred to as "reformation" or "corrections") Theories of rehabilitation argue that the purpose of imprisonment is to change prisoners' lives in a way that will make them productive and law-abiding members of society once they are released. The idea was promoted by 19th century reformers, who promoted prisons as a humane alternative to harsh punishments of the past. Many governments and prison systems have adopted rehabilitation as an official aim. In the United States and Canada, prison agencies are often referred to as "Corrections" services for this reason.
- Deterrence: Theories of deterrence argue that by sentencing criminals to extremely harsh penalties, other people who might be considering criminal activities will be so terrified of the consequences that they will choose not to commit crimes out of fear.
- Incapacitation: Theories of incapacitation argue that while prisoners are incarcerated, they will be unable to commit crimes, thus keeping communities safer.
- Retribution: Theories of retributive justice argue that the purpose of imprisonment is to cause punitive damages to the prisoner, in proportion to the perceived seriousness of their crime. These theories do not necessarily focus on whether or not a particular punishment benefits the community, but instead are based upon a belief that some kind of moral balance will be achieved by "paying back" the prisoner for the wrongs they have committed.

=== Alternatives ===
Modern prison reform movements generally seek to reduce prison populations. A key goal is to improve conditions by reducing overcrowding. Prison reformers also argue that alternative methods are often better at rehabilitating offenders and preventing crime in the long term. Countries that have sought to actively reduce prison populations include Sweden, Germany and the Netherlands.

Alternatives to prison sentences include:

- Fines
- Community service
- Capital punishment
- Suspended sentence: The offender performs of a period of probation and only serves a prison sentence if the terms of probation are broken. This is similar to the Canadian concept of a conditional sentence.
- House arrest/curfews: Sometimes a condition of a strict suspended/conditional sentence.
- Mandatory treatment for drug offenders.
- Rehabilitation programs, such as anger management classes.
- Mental health treatment for offenders with mental illness.
- Judicial corporal punishment
- Conditional discharge: The offender is not punished for the crime if they abide by certain conditions; typically they must not commit any further crimes within a designated period.
- Other court orders that take away privileges from the offender, such as banning motoring offenders from driving.
- Restorative justice programs, (Note: Sometimes called "reparative justice" (See Weitekamp, Elmar (1993). "Reparative justice: Towards a victim oriented system". European Journal on Criminal Policy and Research. 1 (1): 70–93. doi:10.1007/BF02249525. S2CID 147309026.)) which overlap with the above methods. Restorative justice is based around arranging a mediation between the offender and victim, so that the offenders can take responsibility for their actions, "to repair the harm they've done—by apologizing, returning stolen money, or community service".

These alternatives do not eliminate the need for imprisonment altogether. Suspended sentences entail the threat of time in prison, while for others, actual imprisonment may be used as a punishment for noncompliance.

The prison abolition movement seeks to eliminate prisons altogether. It is distinct from prison reform, although abolitionists often support reform campaigns, regarding them as incremental steps towards abolishing prisons. The abolition movement is motivated by a belief that prisons are inherently ineffective and discriminatory. The movement is associated with libertarian socialism, anarchism and anti-authoritarianism, with some prison abolitionists arguing that imprisoning people for actions the state designates as crimes is not only inexpedient but also immoral.

== Crime within prisons ==
In many prisons violence committed by other prisoners or staff is frequent. Prisons have been criticized for frequently not prosecuting crimes committed within the prison.

== Recidivism ==
A large percentage of former prisoners commit crimes after their release from prison (recidivism). Recidivism data was found from 33 countries with results showing released prisoners having a 2-year reconviction rates between 18% and 55%, while individuals given community sentences had rates between 10% and 47%. The argument that prisons can reduce crime through incapacitation is widely accepted, even among academics who doubt that prisons can rehabilitate or deter offenders. One dissenting argument is from Arrigo and Milovanovic, who argue that prisoners will simply continue to victimize people inside of the prison and that this harm has impacts on the society outside.

Academic studies have been inconclusive as to whether high imprisonment rates reduce crime rates in comparison to low imprisonment rates; only a minority suggest it creates a significant reduction, and others suggest it increases crime.

Prisoners are at risk of being drawn further into crime, as they may become acquainted with other criminals, trained in further criminal activity, exposed to further abuse (both from staff and other prisoners) and left with criminal records that make it difficult to find legal employment after release. All of these things can result in a higher likelihood of reoffending upon release.

This has resulted in a series of studies that are skeptical towards the idea that prison can rehabilitate offenders. As Morris and Rothman (1995) point out, "It's hard to train for freedom in a cage." Prison reform organizations such as the Howard League for Penal Reform are not entirely opposed to attempting to rehabilitate offenders, but instead argue that most prisoners would be more likely to be rehabilitated if they received a punishment other than prison. The National Institute of Justice argues that offenders can be deterred by the fear of being caught but are unlikely to be deterred by the fear or experience of the punishment. Like Lawrence W. Sherman, they argue that better policing is a more effective way to reduce crime rates.

== Prisons and marginalized groups ==
=== People with disabilities ===
==== United States ====
People with disabilities are overrepresented in the American criminal justice system, with 40% of people in state prisons having disabilities compared to 15% of the general population. Factors that may contribute to this are lack of social support, lack of effective communication with law enforcement or legal representation, poverty, bias and prejudice, and mental health issues, among others. The United States Department of Justice reported that people with disabilities were victims of 26% of nonfatal violent crimes while being accounted for 15% of the population from 2017-2019 in addition to being four times as likely to be a victim of a violent crime (46.2 per 1,000 age 12 or older) than those without a disability (12.3 per 1,000). As police are often the first responders to mental health crises, this can increase the chance of conflicts with the mentally ill. In 2015, a Washington Post investigation reported that 124 people out of 462 in the United States for whom police were called for assistance with a person in an immediate mental health crisis were shot by the first responders; most of those shot were armed in the interaction, however.

The National registry of exonerations found that 70% of people in the United States who falsely confessed and were later exonerated had intellectual disabilities and mental illness. Those with intellectual disabilities were exonerated from murder in 69% of cases with 29% of those being exonerated from the death penalty compared to 13% of the total exonerations.

All prisons in the U.S are covered by the Americans with Disabilities Act of 1990 (ADA) and those that receive Federal funds are also covered by section 504 of the Rehabilitation Act (Section 504). Both of these laws prohibit discrimination against people with disabilities including inmates and requiring reasonable accommodations. Examples of reasonable accommodations is ensuring that inmates with disabilities can access cell features without assistance.

==== World wide ====
The United Nations Convention on the rights with people with disabilities outlines standards of rights with people with disabilities with article 2 requiring facilities and detentions to make reasonable accommodations to people with disabilities to ensure they can exercise there rights on an equal basis with others. This same provision is now in the revised version of United Nations Standard Minimum rules for the treatment of prisoners on rule 5.2, requiring prison administrations to make reasonable accommodations for prisoners with disabilities to ensure equitable access to prison life.

=== Black people ===
==== United States ====
Black people making up 13% of the United States population make up 37% of the prison population. The American Office of Juvenile Justice and Delinquency Prevention has found that in 2020, 4223.1 out of 100,000 black people of all ages were arrested compared to 2092.1 white people out 100,000. At the end of 2017, American federal and state prison population for blacks was 475,000, compared to 436,000 of whites. Ten years earlier, there were 592,000 of black people and 330,000 white people in prison.

The United States sentencing commission found that black males were 23.3% less likely to get a probation sentence than white males with Hispanic males being 26.6%. They reported that black males received sentences 13% longer, and Hispanic males received sentences 11.2% longer than whites. For sentences less than 18 months, black males served a sentence 6.8% longer than white males.

== See also ==
- Debtors' prison
- Decarceration in the United States
- For-profit prisons
- Immigration detention
- Incarceration and health
- Incarceration in the United States
- Inmate telephone system
- LGBT people in prison
- Life imprisonment
- List of prisons
- Military prison
- Open prison
- Prison farm
- Prison gang
- Prison officer
- Prison pose
- Prison sexuality, including homosexuality and sexual abuse
- Prison strike
- Prisoner abuse
- Prisoners' rights
- School-to-prison pipeline
- Silent treatment
- Standard Minimum Rules for the Treatment of Prisoners

== Sources ==
- Fox, Lionel W. (1952), The English Prison and Borstal Systems, Routledge and Kegan Paul, ISBN 978-0-415-17738-2
