= Inmate Code =

Prison code

The Inmate Code (sometimes referred to as "Convict Code") refers to the rules and values that have developed among prisoners inside prisons' social systems. The inmate code helps define an inmate's image as a model prisoner. The code helps to emphasize unity of prisoners against correctional workers.

This code highlights the reasons why "rehabilitation" is often so difficult to achieve.

== The Code ==
In New Jersey, Gresham Sykes performed a study in prisons and refined the code as follows:

1. Don't Interfere With Inmate Interests. Never rat on an inmate, don't be nosy, don't have loose lips, and never put an inmate on the spot.
2. Don't Fight With Other Inmates. Don't lose your head; do your own time.
3. Don't Exploit Inmates. If you make a promise, keep it, don't steal from inmates, don't sell favors, and don't go back on bets.
4. Maintain Yourself. Don't: weaken, whine, cop out. Be a man and be tough.
5. Don't Trust Guards Or The Things They Stand For. Don't be a sucker, the officials are wrong and the prisoners are right.

== Notes ==
59-13
