= Helena, Alabama =

City in Alabama, United States

- City
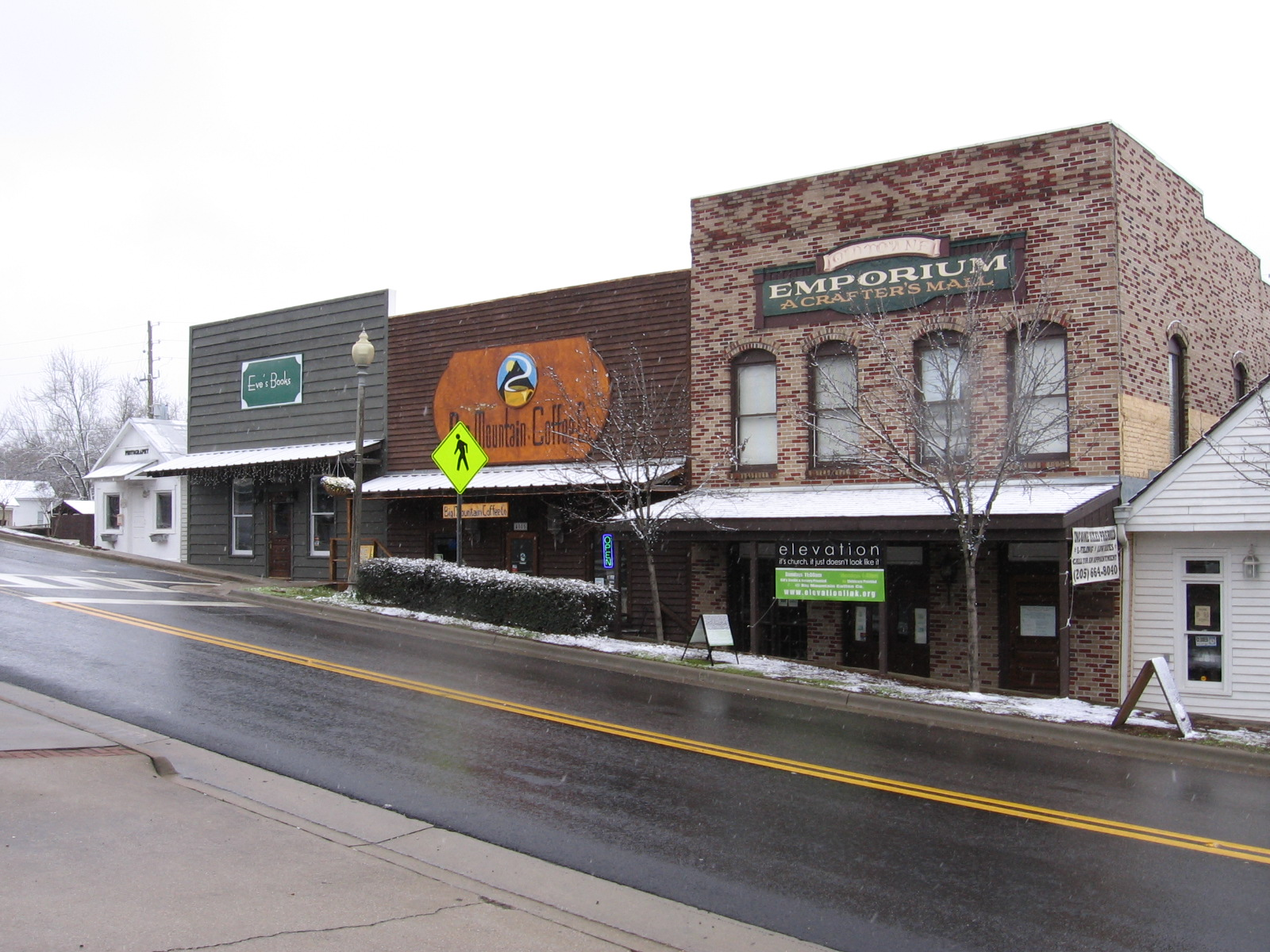
- "Old Town" Helena during a rare snowfall on January 19, 2008: These buildings date to the late 1800s.

- Flag Seal

- Location of Helena in Jefferson County and Shelby County, Alabama.
- Coordinates: 33°16′47″N 86°51′22″W
- Country: United States
- State: Alabama
- Counties: Shelby, Jefferson

Government
  - Mayor: Billy Rosener

Area
  - Total: 22.37 sq mi (57.95 km^{2})
  - Land: 22.06 sq mi (57.13 km^{2})
  - Water: 0.32 sq mi (0.82 km^{2})
- Elevation: 453 ft (138 m)

Population (2020)
  - Total: 20,914
  - Density: 948.2/sq mi (366.09/km^{2})
- Time zone: UTC-6 (Central (CST))
  - Summer (DST): UTC-5 (CDT)
- ZIP code: 35080, 35022
- Area code: 205
- FIPS code: 01-34024
- GNIS feature ID: 2404677
- Website: www.cityofhelena.org

Helena (/həˈlinə/) is a city in Jefferson and Shelby counties in the state of Alabama. Helena is considered a suburb of Birmingham and part of the Birmingham-Hoover Metropolitan Area. As of 2025, the population estimate is 23,388.

Helena initially incorporated in 1877, but reincorporated in 1917 after errors were discovered in the initial incorporation papers. Due to this, the U.S. Census Bureau did not record Helena's population separately until 1920.

== History ==
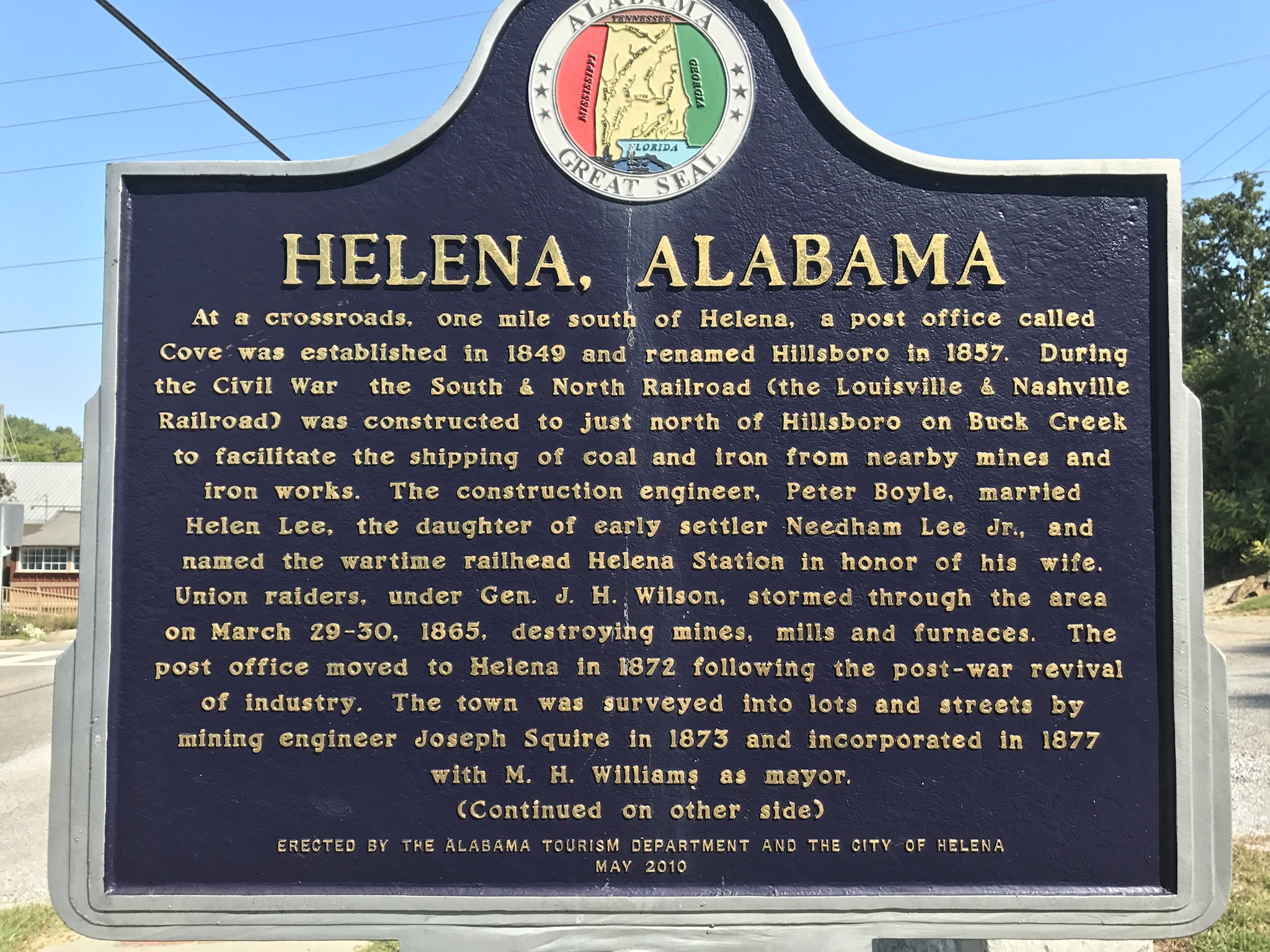
Helena, AL town historical marker sign

=== Early settlers ===
The area was long the territory of the historic Muscogee people, known by English colonists as the Creek Indians. While Scots-Irish and English traders had interaction with them, and there was some armed conflict in the early 19th century, most European-American settlers did not come to this area until 1849. This was after the United States had conducted Indian Removal of the Creek and other Southeastern tribes in the 1830s, to lands west of the Mississippi River.

The first European-American settlers to Helena, which they initially named Cove, were veterans of the final campaigns of the War of 1812. Members of Andrew Jackson's army were attracted to the quiet, peaceful valleys and streams after the Battle of Horseshoe Bend. By 1856, the Cove post office opened. Shortly thereafter, the settlers changed the name of the town to Hillsboro.

=== Civil War ===
The onset of the American Civil War brought the need for the South to increase its manufacturing production and develop new industries, in service of the Confederate States of America. Coal and iron ore mines were dug throughout this area and the construction of the Louisville & Nashville Railroad provided new transportation connections. Helena became an important industrial center for the wartime efforts. Around 1864 a rolling mill was built on Buck Creek, near the rail lines to process the iron from Selma.

Peter Boyle, an engineer for the railroad working on a new line, met and courted Helen Lee. He would name the rail station that supported the rolling mill after her. Eventually the town was named Helena after the train station.

==== Wilson's Raid ====
As the final battles of the Civil War were being fought, Union forces amassed a force for a cavalry raid to attack the South's war fighting capability, as Sherman's march had done the previous year. Led by James Harrison Wilson, this force passed through the town of Helena on March 30, 1865, where they destroyed much of the newly developed industry and residential buildings.

=== Reconstruction ===
Within a few years of the end of the Civil War and the beginning of the reconstruction era, industrialists were again developing the area coal and iron ore resources. The railroads were rebuilt and coke ovens were established by the Eureka Company in 1870. The rolling mill was rebuilt in 1873, with support spurred by Rufus Cobb, later elected as a two-term governor. Much of what was Hillsboro had been absorbed by the expanding Helena area. The town was surveyed by Joseph Squire in 1873 and incorporated in 1877.

By 1880, Helena contained

six mercantile stores, one drugstore, two hotels, and several boarding houses… The rolling mill had been expanded and modernized and the number of merchants had increased.

A rail yard was added by the Louisville & Nashville Railroad Company.

=== Depression era ===
Helena was first incorporated in 1877 but had to reincorporated in 1917 after the initial incorporation paperwork was found to contain errors. Charles Hind was elected mayor the same year. Much of the industry began to decline as the economy contracted in the years after World War I. The rolling mill was closed in 1923 and many mine closures followed. As the Great Depression set in during the 1930s, the town fell on hard times. Many residents left to find work elsewhere.

==== 1933 Tornado ====
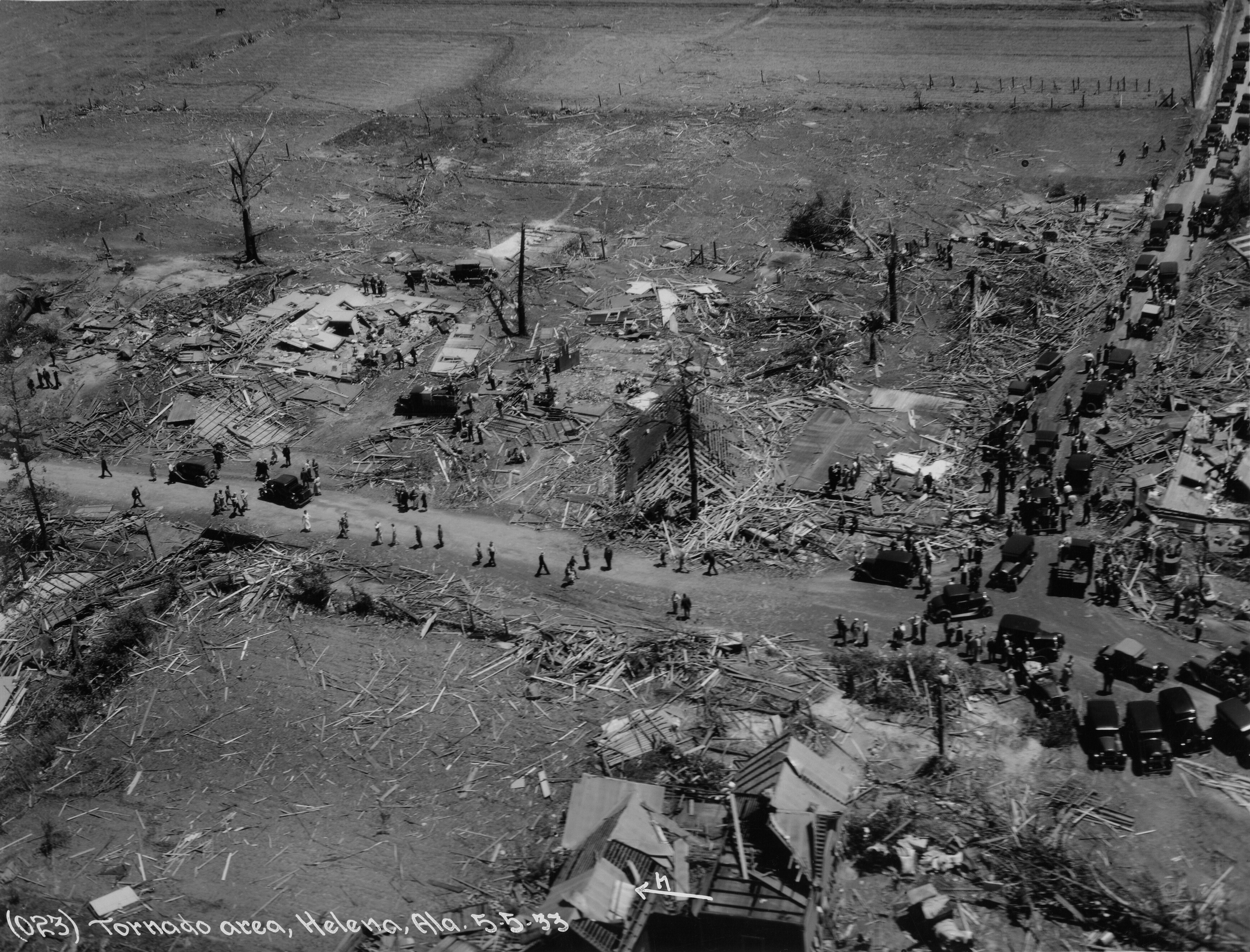
Damage of the tornado

Around 3 AM on May 5, 1933, residents were awoken to a massive tornado that ripped through the heart of Helena. A total of twelve persons were killed; 75 people were reported as injured. Many of the original houses were completely destroyed and railroad cars were overturned. The property damage was estimated to be in the range of $100,000 to $150,000 (not adjusted).

=== Modern expansion ===
Helena remained a small town in the largely rural county until suburban growth from Birmingham reached the city in the late 20th century. Numerous residential and commercial developments have taken place, spurring improvements to city facilities and services. By the early 21st century, Helena had large population gains, with related growing pains in trying to provide services, as a result of its convenient location and high quality of life.

==== 2021 tornado ====
Another tornado struck the town on March 25, 2021, causing EF1 damage to several homes and downing trees throughout several neighborhoods. The tornado eventually reached low-end EF3 strength northeast of town.

== Geography ==
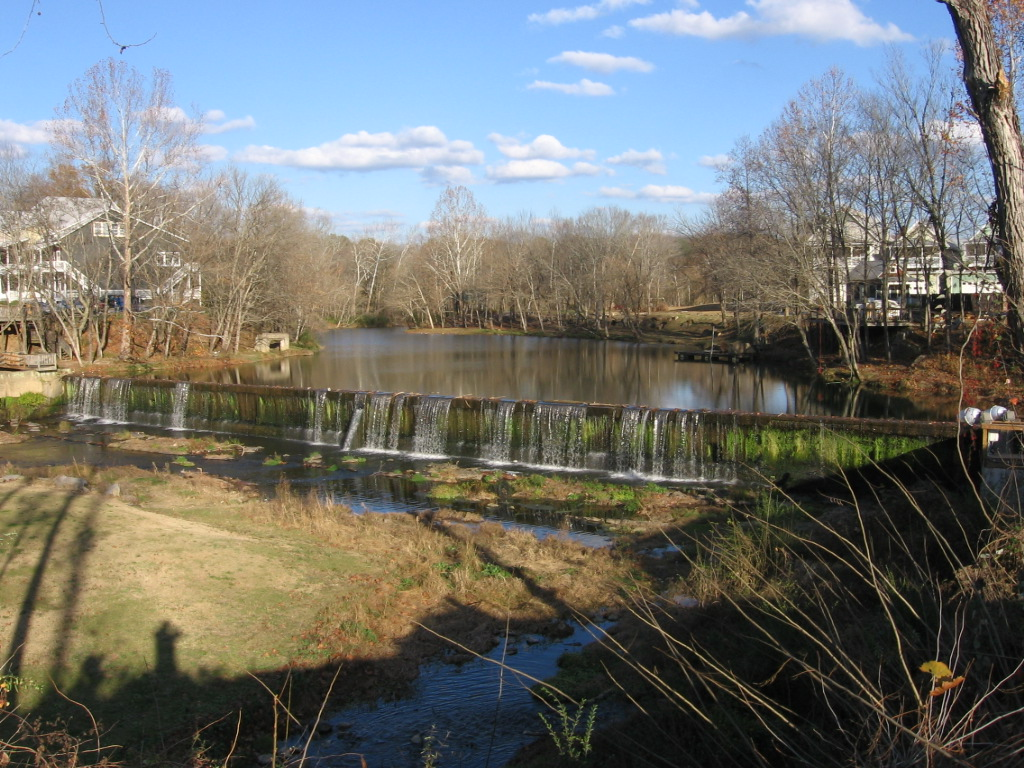
Buck Creek flows over the dam at Helena, Alabama, during the autumn low-water flow.

According to the U.S. Census Bureau, the city has a total area of 17.1 square miles (44 km^{2}), of which 17.1 square miles (44 km^{2}) is land and 0.04 square miles (0.10 km^{2}) (0.12%) is covered by water. The Cahaba River and its tributary Buck Creek run through Helena. Buck Creek is dammed upstream of Alabama State Route 261 in the Old Town area to form Lake Davidson. It was used both for recreation and to generate water wheel power at the turn of the 20th century. Fishing, wading, and canoeing are popular uses of both waterways.

Helena sits at the foothills of the very southern extent of the Appalachian Mountains as they descend into the Gulf of Mexico coastal plain. The area is largely rolling hills with numerous small streams, and undeveloped areas are primarily mixed woodlands.

Downtown Birmingham is 20 mi (32 km) north via Alabama Route 261 to US-31 or I-65.

=== Climate ===
The climate of Helena is typical of the Deep South, with long, hot, humid summers and short, relatively mild winters. Summer high temperatures are commonly in the upper 90s and low 100s F; winter lows are usually in the 20s F. Measurable snowfall is rare, occurring only a few times a decade. Thunderstorms are frequent occurrences during the summer. The Helena area experiences two severe weather peaks, early spring (March–April) and late fall (November), with tornadoes being frequent hazards during both peaks. Hurricanes coming ashore on the northern Gulf coast occasionally reach Helena with tropical storm-force winds.

Climate data for Helena, Alabama, 1991–2020 normals, extremes 2002–2021
Month	Jan	Feb	Mar	Apr	May	Jun	Jul	Aug	Sep	Oct	Nov	Dec	Year
Record high °F (°C)	79 (26)	82 (28)	89 (32)	92 (33)	97 (36)	107 (42)	105 (41)	107 (42)	101 (38)	102 (39)	88 (31)	80 (27)	107 (42)
Mean maximum °F (°C)	72.8 (22.7)	76.3 (24.6)	83.1 (28.4)	87.6 (30.9)	93.5 (34.2)	98.4 (36.9)	99.4 (37.4)	99.9 (37.7)	95.8 (35.4)	89.9 (32.2)	77.9 (25.5)	75.1 (23.9)	101.7 (38.7)
Mean daily maximum °F (°C)	54.8 (12.7)	60.1 (15.6)	68.0 (20.0)	76.1 (24.5)	83.4 (28.6)	89.6 (32.0)	92.2 (33.4)	92.0 (33.3)	87.2 (30.7)	76.3 (24.6)	64.9 (18.3)	57.0 (13.9)	75.1 (24.0)
Daily mean °F (°C)	44.7 (7.1)	49.0 (9.4)	56.5 (13.6)	63.6 (17.6)	71.9 (22.2)	78.7 (25.9)	81.7 (27.6)	81.1 (27.3)	75.8 (24.3)	64.3 (17.9)	53.3 (11.8)	46.9 (8.3)	64.0 (17.8)
Mean daily minimum °F (°C)	34.6 (1.4)	37.8 (3.2)	45.0 (7.2)	51.2 (10.7)	60.3 (15.7)	67.7 (19.8)	71.2 (21.8)	70.2 (21.2)	64.4 (18.0)	52.3 (11.3)	41.6 (5.3)	36.8 (2.7)	52.8 (11.5)
Mean minimum °F (°C)	16.3 (−8.7)	22.1 (−5.5)	26.9 (−2.8)	35.2 (1.8)	45.5 (7.5)	59.1 (15.1)	63.9 (17.7)	62.7 (17.1)	51.6 (10.9)	36.3 (2.4)	24.5 (−4.2)	22.3 (−5.4)	15.1 (−9.4)
Record low °F (°C)	4 (−16)	14 (−10)	19 (−7)	29 (−2)	39 (4)	52 (11)	56 (13)	53 (12)	44 (7)	28 (−2)	18 (−8)	14 (−10)	4 (−16)
Average precipitation inches (mm)	5.10 (130)	5.58 (142)	5.34 (136)	5.18 (132)	4.15 (105)	4.23 (107)	4.76 (121)	4.42 (112)	3.93 (100)	3.62 (92)	4.66 (118)	4.65 (118)	55.62 (1,413)
Average precipitation days (≥ 0.01 in)	10.3	11.9	11.5	9.7	9.8	11.0	12.8	11.3	7.9	7.7	8.7	10.8	123.4
Source 1: NOAA
Source 2: XMACIS2 (mean maxima/minima 2006–2020)

== Demographics ==
Historical population
Census	Pop.	Note	%±
1920	808		—
1930	549		−32.1%
1940	667		21.5%
1950	421		−36.9%
1960	523		24.2%
1970	1,110		112.2%
1980	2,130		91.9%
1990	3,918		83.9%
2000	10,296		162.8%
2010	16,793		63.1%
2020	20,914		24.5%
2025 (est.)	23,388	▲	11.8%
U.S. Decennial Census

=== Racial and ethnic composition ===
Helena city, Alabama – Racial and ethnic composition Note: the US Census treats Hispanic/Latino as an ethnic category. This table excludes Latinos from the racial categories and assigns them to a separate category. Hispanics/Latinos may be of any race. Hispanics/Latinos may be of any race. Race and ethnicity were not reported in Alabama for populations under 2,500 in 1980 and under 1,000 in 1990.
Race / Ethnicity (NH = Non-Hispanic)	Pop 1990	Pop 2000	Pop 2010	Pop 2020	% 1990	% 2000	% 2010	% 2020
White alone (NH)	3,614	9,540	13,547	15,149	92.24%	92.66%	80.67%	72.43%
Black or African American alone (NH)	263	513	2,193	3,382	6.71%	4.98%	13.06%	16.17%
Native American or Alaska Native alone (NH)	13	20	31	41	0.33%	0.19%	0.18%	0.20%
Asian alone (NH)	16	67	245	327	0.41%	0.65%	1.46%	1.56%
Native Hawaiian or Pacific Islander alone (NH)	x	2	4	12	x	0.02%	0.02%	0.06%
Other race alone (NH)	0	3	20	72	0.00%	0.03%	0.12%	0.34%
Mixed race or Multiracial (NH)	x	48	193	915	x	0.47%	1.15%	4.38%
Hispanic or Latino (any race)	12	103	560	1,016	0.31%	1.00%	3.33%	4.86%
Total	3,918	10,296	16,793	20,914	100.00%	100.00%	100.00%	100.00%

=== 2020 census ===
As of the 2020 census, there were 20,914 people, 7,281 households, and 5,119 families residing in the city. The median age was 37.6 years. 28.2% of residents were under the age of 18 and 11.1% were 65 years of age or older. For every 100 females there were 92.5 males, and for every 100 females age 18 and over there were 89.3 males age 18 and over.

89.0% of residents lived in urban areas, while 11.0% lived in rural areas.

There were 7,281 households in Helena, of which 45.5% had children under the age of 18 living in them. Of all households, 65.0% were married-couple households, 10.2% were households with a male householder and no spouse or partner present, and 21.5% were households with a female householder and no spouse or partner present. About 16.9% of all households were made up of individuals and 6.7% had someone living alone who was 65 years of age or older.

There were 7,447 housing units, of which 2.2% were vacant. The homeowner vacancy rate was 0.9% and the rental vacancy rate was 4.3%.

=== 2010 census ===
As of the census of 2010, 16,793 people, 3,828 households, and 3,043 families resided in the city. The population density was 603.0 inhabitants per square mile (232.8/km^{2}). The 3,983 housing units averaged 233.3 per square mile (90.1/km^{2}). The racial makeup of the city was 82.5% White, 13.1% Black or African American, 0.20% Native American, 0.65% Asian, 1.1% Pacific Islander, 0.35% from other races, and 0.52% from two or more races; 3.3% of the population was Hispanic or Latino of any race.

Of the 3,828 households, 43.4% had children under the age of 18 living with them, 70.2% were married couples living together, 7.4% had a female householder with no husband present, and 20.5% were not families; 17.7% of all households were made up of individuals, and 3.0% had someone living alone who was 65 years of age or older. The average household size was 2.69 and the average family size was 3.06.

In the city, the population was distributed as 28.7% under the age of 18, 6.0% from 18 to 24, 42.7% from 25 to 44, 17.5% from 45 to 64, and 5.1% who were 65 years of age or older. The median age was 31 years. For every 100 females, there were 90.9 males. For every 100 females age 18 and over, there were 88.6 males.

The median income for a household in the city was $62,908, and for a family was $66,250. Males had a median income of $45,291 versus $32,431 for females. The per capita income for the city was $26,323. About 1.4% of families and 2.2% of the population were below the poverty line, including 4.2% of those under age 18 and none of those age 65 or over.

== Economy ==
The local economy is broadly diversified among professional, service, and manufacturing jobs. Many of the residents of Helena commute to work in other communities within the greater Birmingham area. No employer is dominant in the city, and recent economic growth has mainly come in the service industries to support the increased population. Well-known local industries include the Vulcan Materials Company construction aggregate quarry and the Plantation Pipeline depot and tank farm. A developed industrial park includes a wide variety of manufacturers.

== Arts and culture ==
Helena holds numerous arts and crafts fairs, and musical performances throughout the year in public spaces. Helena Old Town Live Summer Concert Series bring thousands into Amphitheater Park to hear great music.Helena's residents also have easy access to cultural attractions in the greater Birmingham area, such as the Birmingham Zoo, Birmingham Museum of Art, McWane Center, and Vulcan statue and park.

During 2005, Helena gained nationwide notice as the hometown of singer Bo Bice, who was a finalist on the popular Fox program American Idol. Magnolia Springs Manor was the host of Sacha Baron Cohen’s character Borat in his famous 2006 hit film.

=== Annual cultural events ===
Major annual community events largely reflect traditional small-town American life. They include an Easter Egg Hunt, Buck Creek Festival, 4th of July picnic, concert and fireworks; Fall Carnival, Spring Fling, and Christmas Parade.

=== Museums and other points of interest ===
Major points of interest include the Cahaba River, Old Town Amphitheater, and the Old Town district, which includes the 19th-century jail and railroad freight depot, as well as commercial structures from the 19th century. The Kenneth R. Penhale Museum opened in October 2011 in the Old Town district.

== Sports ==
Outdoor sports are popular in Helena. Football attracts the most participants and spectators at all levels; golf, basketball, baseball, softball, and soccer are also popular among residents. Some children participate in city-sponsored sports and school-sponsored sports. Others participate in sports at the nearby Pelham YMCA.

Numerous minor-league sports franchises are located in the Greater Birmingham area, within which Helena is located. Local sports venues (in that area) include the Hoover Metropolitan Stadium (Hoover Met), Regions Field in Southside of Birmingham, Legion Field in Birmingham, the Birmingham-Jefferson Convention Complex (BJCC), and Barber Motorsports Park in Leeds. College sports, which are most popular in Helena, just like the rest of Alabama, use several of these venues. College sports fans in Helena most commonly support the Alabama Crimson Tide, Auburn Tigers, UAB Blazers, and Samford Bulldogs, and many are alumni of those schools.

== Parks and recreation ==
Numerous parks are provided within Helena by the city and Shelby County. These parks feature open green spaces, playground equipment, a fishing pond, and a baseball field complex often used for tournaments and recreational leagues. The Helena Sports Complex opened in 2003 and features a community center and spaces for baseball, softball, cheerleading, basketball, and soccer. The most popular parks in Helena include Joe Tucker Park and Cahaba Lily Park. The Old Town Helena Amphitheater, along the banks of Buck Creek, features a stage and grass seating area where numerous productions are staged, including the popular Summer Sundown Cinemas (free movies) and 4th of July celebration. The Cahaba River and its tributary Buck Creek run through Helena. Buck Creek is dammed upstream of Alabama Highway 261 in the Old Town area to form Lake Davidson. Fishing, wading, and canoeing are popular uses of both waterways.

== Government ==
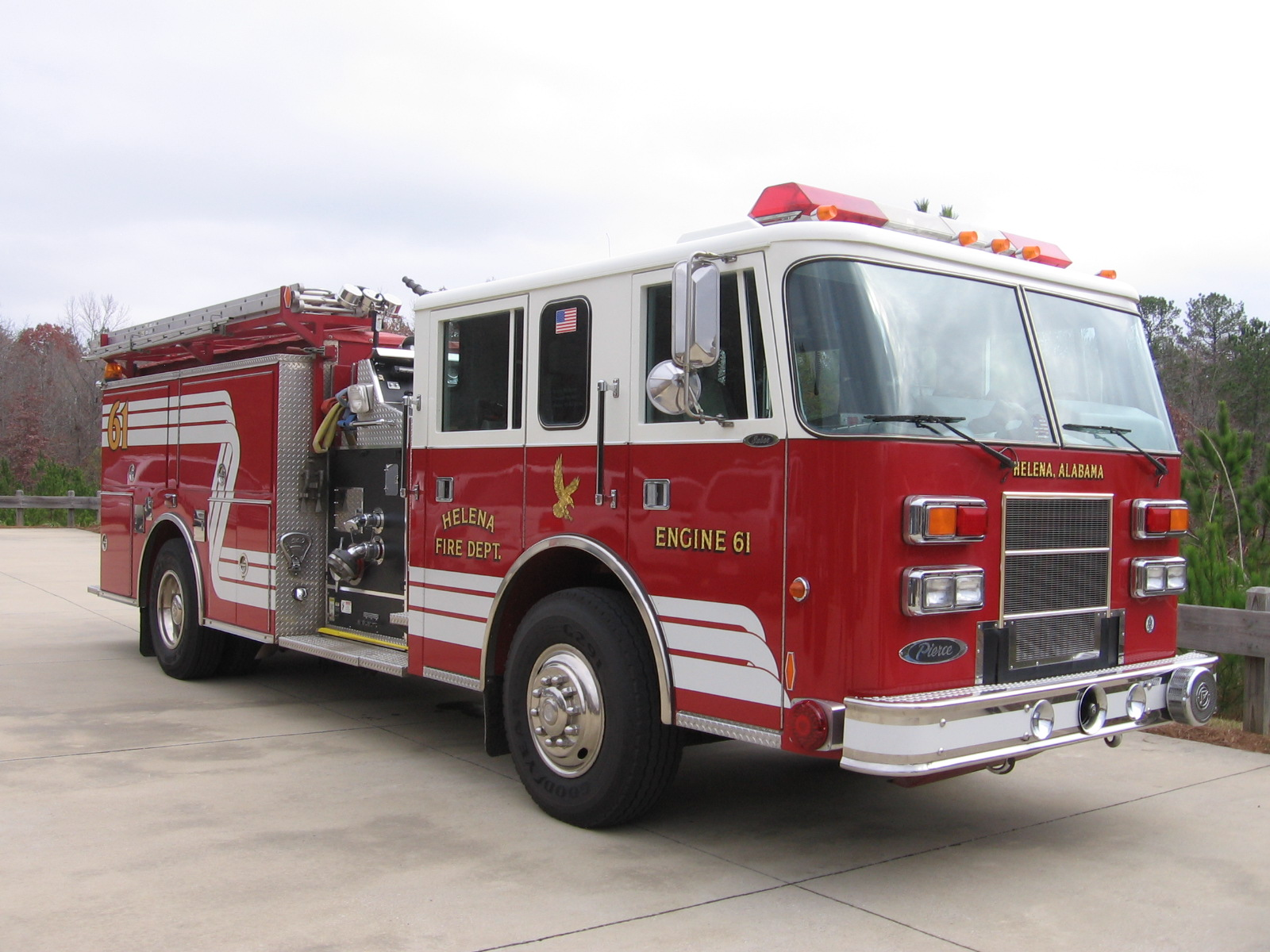
Helena Fire Department's modern Engine 61

The city has an elected mayor-council form of government. The mayor and council is elected at-large. Those elected in 2025 are:

- Mayor – Billy Rosener

Helena City Council:

- Cathy Hammann – Place 1
- Andy Healy – Place 2 (President Pro Tempore)
- Dennis Wilson – Place 3
- Brooke Dodson – Place 4 (City Council President)
- Jeff McDaniels – Place 5

The city operates the following departments:

- Administrative
- Building Inspections, Planning
- Certificates of Use
- Fire
- Human Resources
- Parks & Recreation
- Police
- Public Works
- Revenue and Finance
- Utility Board

The city enjoys full-time, paid public safety services through the Helena Police Department and Helena Fire Department. The Helena Fire Department has three fire stations and includes volunteer firefighters in addition to the paid staff. The Helena Police Department includes a K-9 unit. Together with the fire department, it sponsors a Law Enforcement Explorer Post with Learning for Life, a division of Boy Scouts of America.

== Education ==
Public education for students from kindergarten to 12th grade is provided by the Shelby County School System that provides excellent education from the wide variety of teachers and educators. From Helena Elementary School, Helena Intermediate School, Helena Middle School, and Helena High School. A new high school, to accommodate the increased number of students, was constructed and opened in the fall of the 2014–15 year.

== Media ==
Helena is within the Birmingham/Tuscaloosa/Anniston media market. Its major local television stations are WBRC 6 News, WBIQ APT (PBS) 10, WVTM (NBC) 13, WTTO CW 21, ABC 33/40, WIAT CBS 42, WPXH ION 44, and WABM MyNetworkTV 68. Helena is also served by all the Birmingham radio stations, including 100.5 WJQX, an ESPN Radio station licensed to Helena. The Birmingham News is Helena's major daily newspaper. It publishes a special Shelby County section, the Shelby News, in addition to the regular Birmingham edition, which is distributed to Helena subscribers.

The Shelby County Reporter is a weekly newspaper covering Shelby County, including Helena.

Additionally, the Helena - The Magazine is published monthly by the City of Helena as a public service; it is mailed to all Helena residents. The Helena - The Magazine is a news and culture magazine-style publication, that runs 52 pages, and includes reporting on past and future community events, profiles on local businesses and residents, and monthly columns by area physicians and elected government officials.

== Infrastructure ==
=== Transportation ===
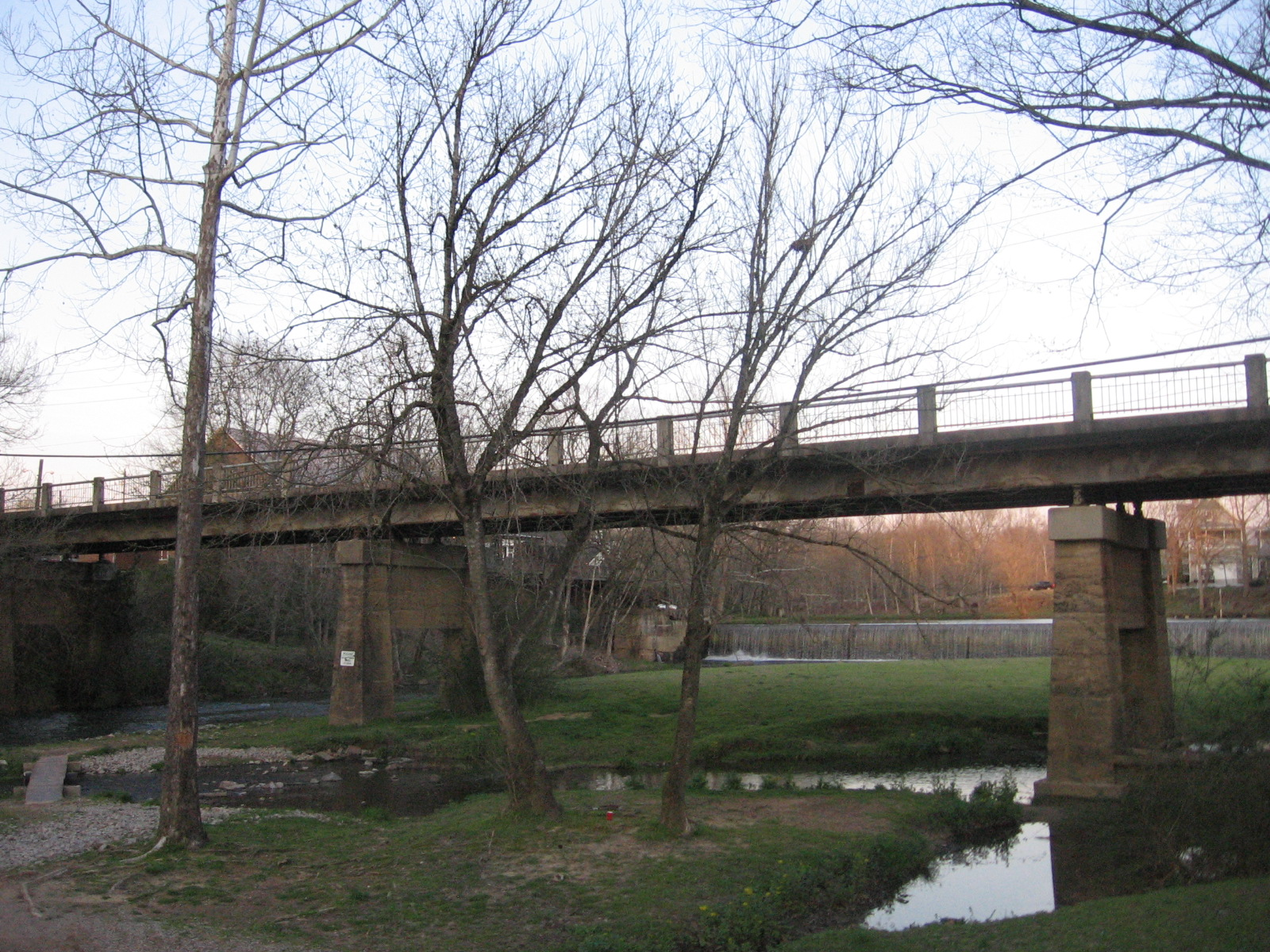
Alabama 261 bridge across Buck Creek in Helena

Helena is located near two major interstates. I-459, which joins major east–west interstates I-20 and I-59, is located 9 miles to the north; north-south oriented I-65 is 3 miles east of Old Town Helena. AL-261 runs through the heart of Helena and connects the city to neighboring Pelham, where it intersects US-31, located 2 miles east of Old Town. Here it becomes Valleydale Road and continues to its terminus at US-280, ultimately connecting Helena with eastern Hoover.

CSX Transportation provides rail service on two separate lines, the S&NA South subdivision between Birmingham and Montgomery, and the Lineville subdivision between Birmingham and Atlanta, Georgia.

General aviation and private jet services are available at the nearby Bessemer Airport (EKY) about 8 miles north of Old Town. Extensive commercial flights are available at the Birmingham-Shuttlesworth International Airport (BHM) about 25 miles to the northeast. Intercity rail service is available on the Amtrak Crescent, 19 miles to the north in Birmingham.

=== Utilities ===
Electric service is provided by Alabama Power Company; water, sewage, and garbage pick-up by the city; and cable television and internet provided by multiple providers.

=== Healthcare ===
Numerous medical professionals practice in Helena. Many cater to family and individual patient's needs in areas such as counseling, dentistry, psychiatry, physical therapy and primary care. The city also benefits from its proximity to Birmingham's extensive medical community, including several major hospitals and University of Alabama at Birmingham medical schools. The closest hospital is Baptist Shelby in Alabaster.

== Notable people ==
- Bo Bice, American Idol's 2005 runner-up
- Liz Cochran, 2009 Miss Alabama and competitor in the 2010 Miss America Pageant, birthplace
- Richard Fitts, Boston Red Sox pitcher, graduated Helena High School in 2018
- Vonetta Flowers, Olympic Gold Medal gymnast
- Brent Hinds, guitarist and vocalist of Mastodon (band), grew up in Helena
- Leigh Hulsey, member of the Alabama House of Representatives and former member of the city council
- Rebecca Luker, actor and singer, musicals

== Images ==
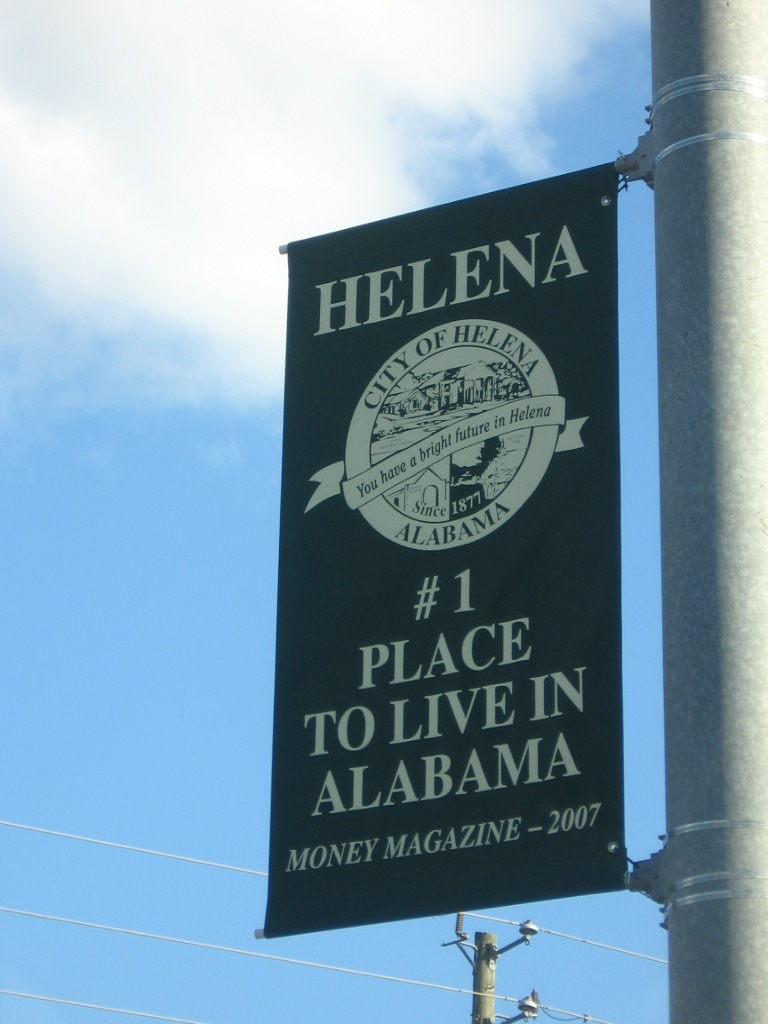
Street banner announcing Money naming Helena the number-one place to live in Alabama in 2007.

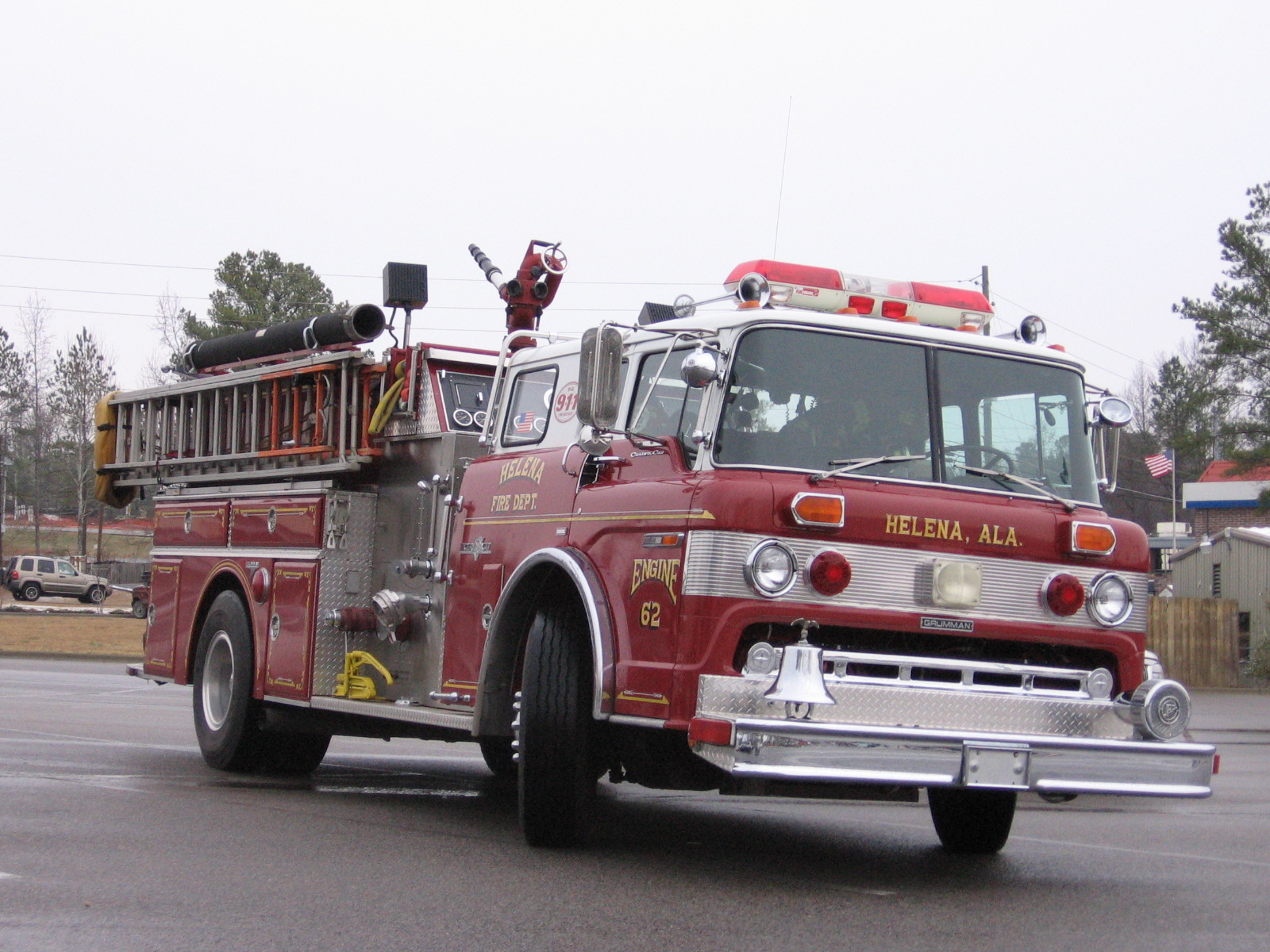
Helena Fire Department Engine 63. This 1980s engine won several awards for appearance and is currently in service as a reserve unit.

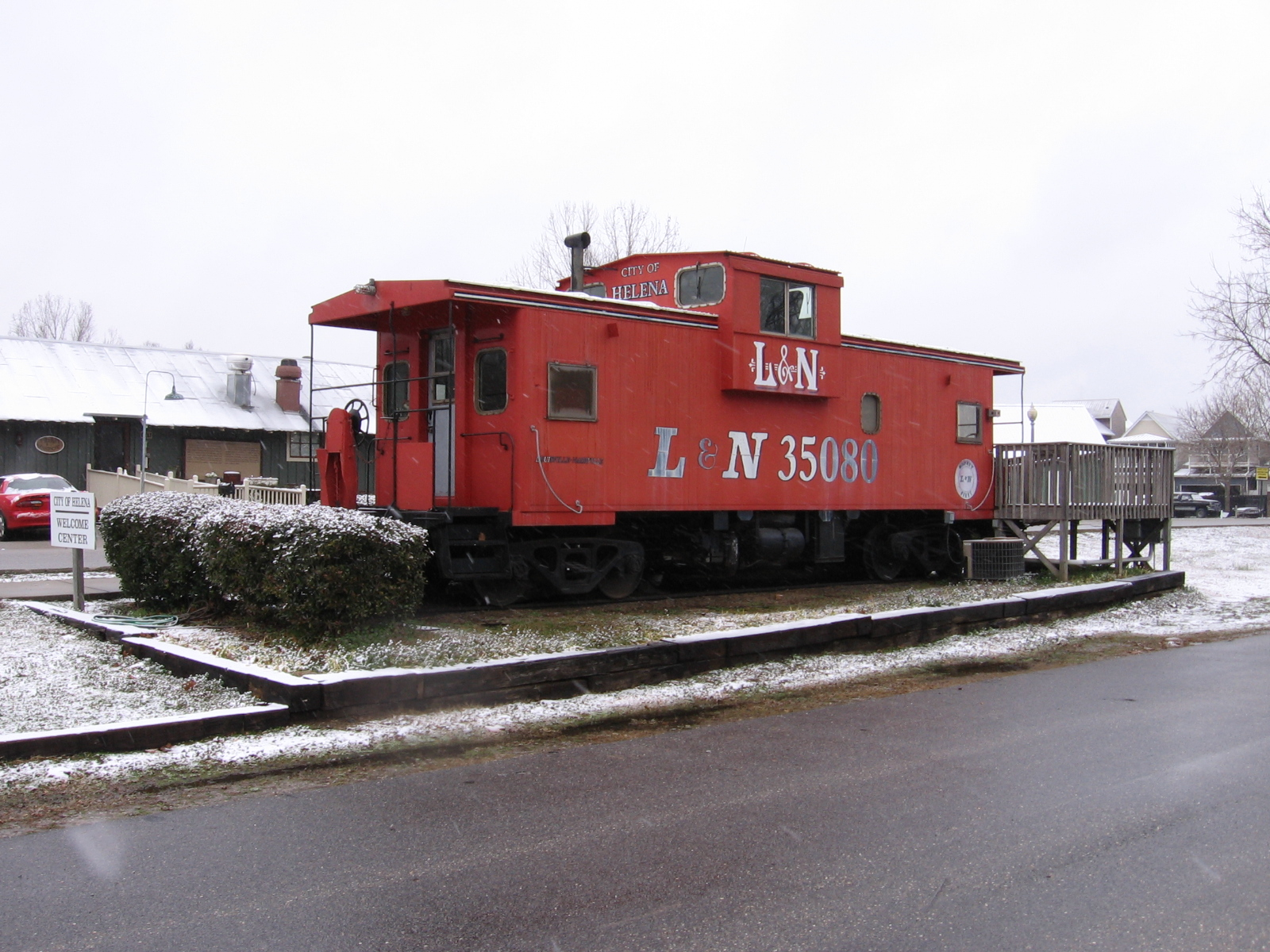
The City of Helena Welcome Center is housed in a Louisville & Nashville Railroad caboose in Old Town next to the CSX S&NA Subdivision tracks.
