= Alabama State Route 261 =

State highway in Alabama, United States

State Route 261
- Helena Road

Route information
- Maintained by ALDOT
- Length: 5.897 mi (9.490 km)

Major junctions
- South end: CR 17 / CR 52 / CR 91 at Helena
- North end: US 31 / CR 17 at Pelham

Location
- Country: United States
- State: Alabama
- Counties: Shelby

Highway system
- Alabama State Highway System; Interstate; US; State
| ← SR 259 | → SR 263 |

State Route 261 (SR 261) is a 6-mile (9.7 km) state highway that connects Helena with Pelham in northern Shelby County, as part of the Birmingham/Hoover metropolitan area. SR 261 is two lanes wide for the entirety of its route. It serves as a feeder route to numerous subdivisions in Helena and Pelham.

== Route description ==
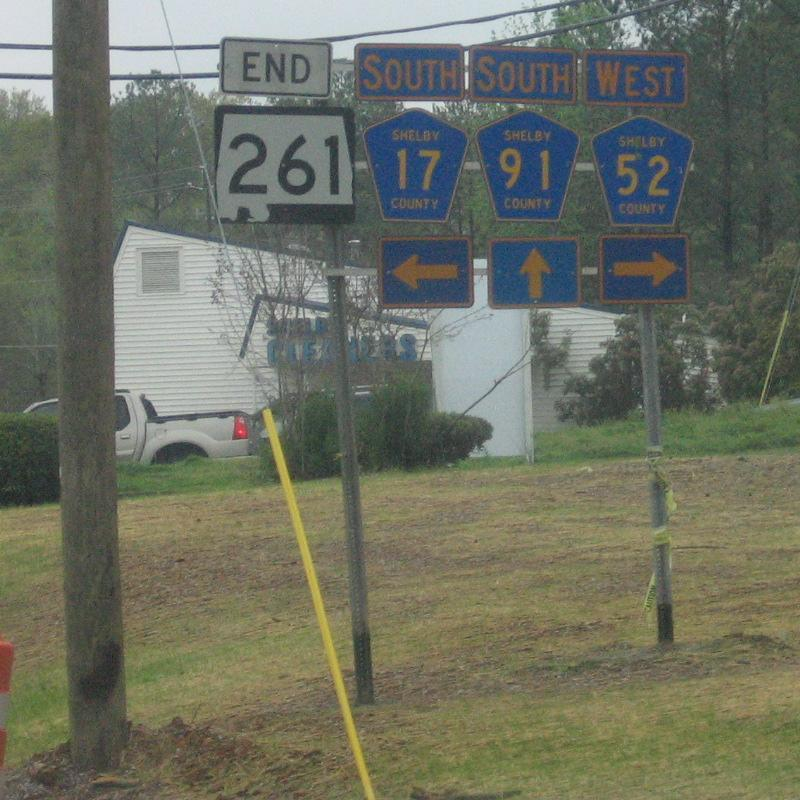
State Route 261 southern terminus in Helena

The southern terminus of the route is at the intersection with Shelby County Road 17 (CR 17), CR 52, and CR 91 in Helena. The northern terminus is at the intersection with U.S. Route 31 (US 31) in Pelham. North of US 31, the route is designated as CR 17 and continues to US 280 in the Inverness area of Hoover. Mileage is measured from Helena; miles are marked by roadside green metal mile markers. Throughout its length SR 261 is also known as and commonly appears on maps and street signs as Helena Road. The majority of the route is relatively level through suburban housing and commercial businesses, the steepest grades occur approaching and departing the Buck Creek floodplain.

It is expected that as work will begin to widen the highway to five lanes between US 31 and CR 105 (Bearden Road) as soon as 2012. Long range plans call for routing SR 261 around historic Old Town Helena via a new bypass that will intersect with CR 52 west of the current terminus.

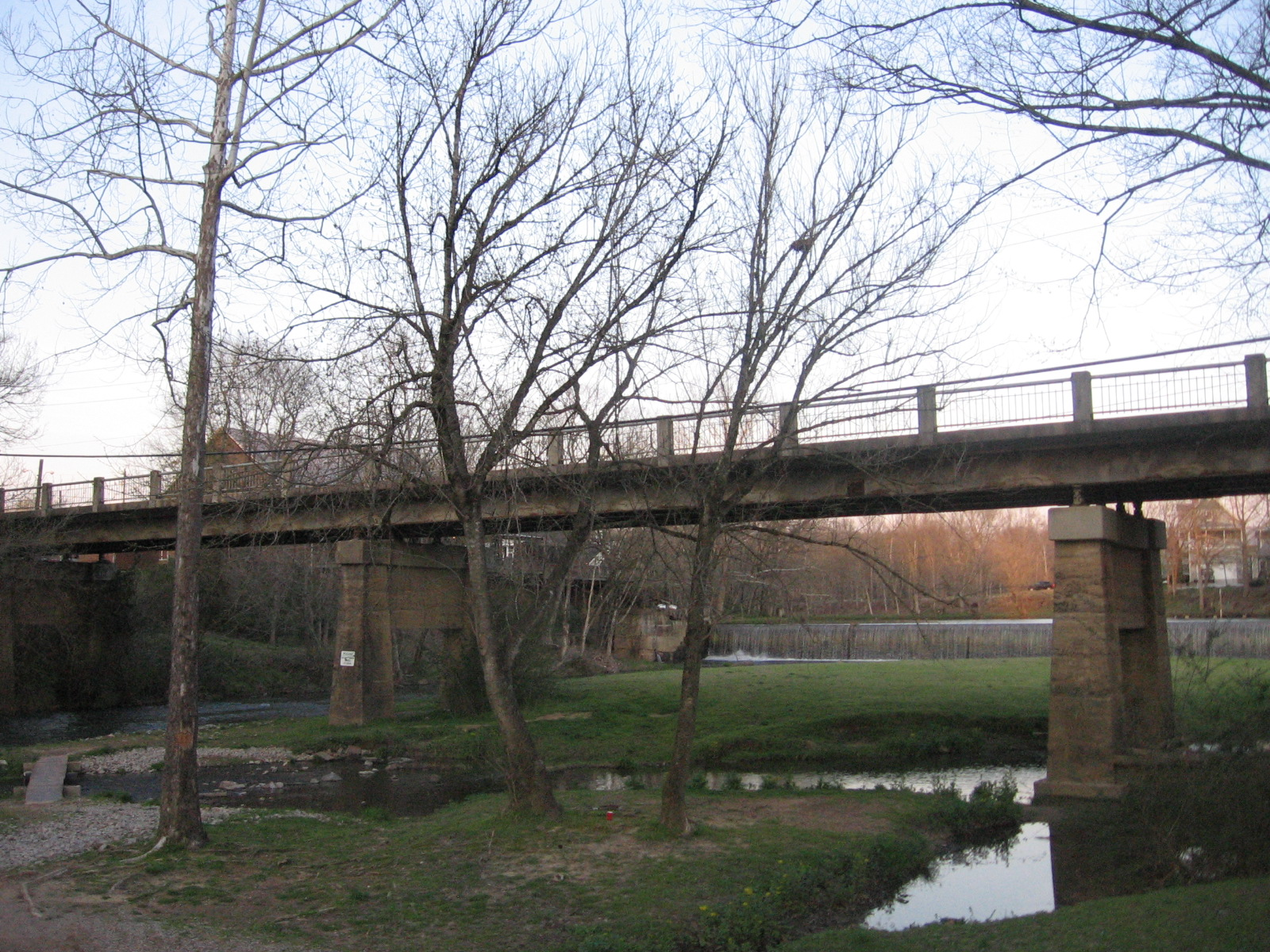
SR 261 bridge across Buck Creek in Helena

SR 261 crosses the Vulcan Materials Helena quarry on a concrete deck bridge (MP 2.2) east of Old Town Helena. The route crosses Buck Creek on a concrete pier supported steel W-shape girder bridge with a concrete deck (MP 1.3). Steel railings provide vehicle protection, a narrow sidewalk is present on the downstream side of the bridge. SR 261 crosses three railroad tracks at grade consisting of the CSX Transportation Lineville Subdivision east of Buck Creek (MP 1.4) and the CSX Transportation S&NA Subdivision (and connected siding) west of Buck Creek (MP 1.2). The Lineville Subdivision crossing is equipped with flashing lights, the S&NA South Subdivision crossing is equipped with flashing lights and crossing arms.

A historic marker for the Central Iron Works rolling mill, built in 1865 and since destroyed, is at the intersection of Lake Davidson Road and SR 261 in Helena at milepost 1.2.

On March 27, 1994, a F2 tornado touched down on the northern edge of Helena at the Bearden Farm on the west side of the route, then moved across the road near Pelham High School and continued into Pelham and other communities to the east causing damage to many business buildings.

== Major intersections ==
The entire route is in Shelby County.

| Location | mi | km | Destinations | Notes |
|---|---|---|---|---|
| Helena | 0.000 | 0.000 | CR 17 south (Highway 17) / CR 52 west / CR 91 south (Coalmont Road) | Southern terminus; end of state maintenance |
| Pelham | 5.897 | 9.490 | US 31 (Pelham Parkway/SR 3) / CR 17 north (Valleydale Road) – Hoover, Alabaster | Northern terminus |
1.000 mi = 1.609 km; 1.000 km = 0.621 mi
