= Buck Creek (Cahaba River tributary) =

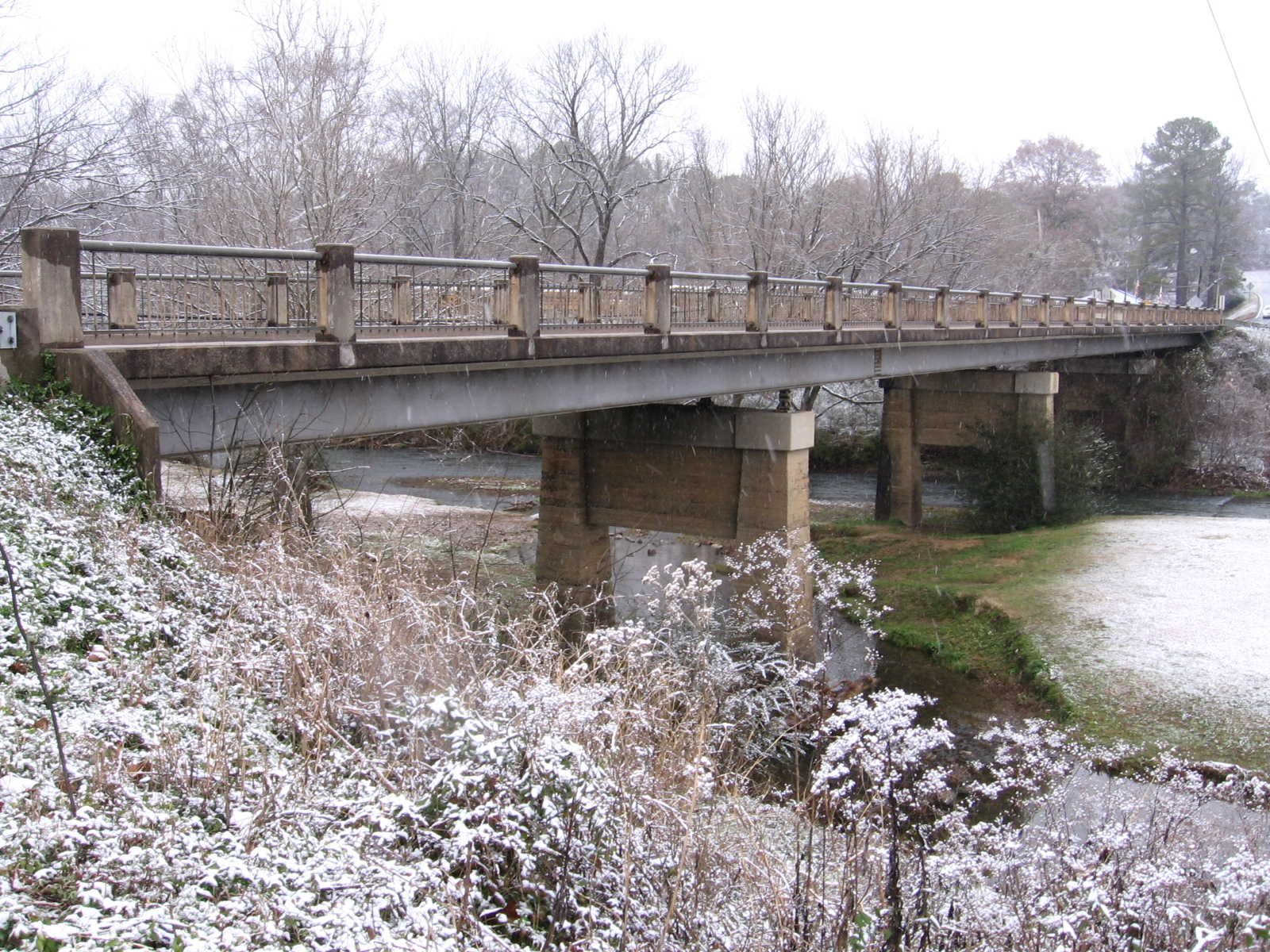

Location
- Country: United States
- State: Alabama
- Cities: Helena, Pelham, Alabaster

Physical characteristics
- Source
  - location: Shelby County
- Mouth: Cahaba River
  - location: Helena, Shelby County, Alabama
  - coordinates: 33°16′47″N 86°51′22″W
- Discharge
  - location: Helena

Buck Creek is a 17.3-mile-long (27.8 km) tributary of the Cahaba River that was used to supply water power for manufacturing and industry during the 19th century. Its current use is primarily recreational and as a discharge point for municipal water treatment facilities.

== Route ==
Buck Creek is entirely contained within Shelby County, Alabama, with a flow direction (generally southeast to northwest) against the prevailing orientation of valleys and ridges in central Alabama. The farthest headwaters of the creek lie on Double Mountain, from where the creek flows south, turning west at Saginaw. Passing under U.S. Route 31, Interstate 65, and State Route 119, Buck Creek turns north and passes Siluria and the cities of Alabaster and Pelham. Turning northwest, the creek passes the city of Helena. The creek is dammed upstream of State Route 261 in the Old Town area to form Lake Davidson which was used for recreation and water wheel power at the turn of the 20th century. This dam is illuminated at night. Continuing northwest, Buck Creek reaches the Cahaba River below the CSX Transportation S&NA South Subdivision railroad bridge.

== Crossings ==
Crossing	Carries	Location
	US Highway 31	Saginaw
	CSX	Saginaw
	Interstate 20	Sagiinaw
	Montevallo Road (AL 119)	Alabaster
	Thompson Road (County Road 264)	Alabaster
Foot Bridge	Buck Creek Trail	Alabaster
Foot Bridge	Buck Creek Trail	Alabaster
	6th Avenue SW	Alabaster
	1st Avenue W	Alabaster
	Industrial Road	Alabaster
	Stonehaven Trail	Pelham
	County Road 52	Pelham
Girder Bridge	CSX S&NA South Subdivision	Helena
Girder Bridge	CSX S&NA South Subdivision	Helena
Girder Bridge	CSX Lineville Subdivision	Helena
Girder Bridge	CSX S&NA South Subdivision	Helena
Girder Bridge	Alabama State Route 261	Helena

== Tributaries ==
The major tributary of Buck Creek is Cahaba Valley Creek which enters Buck Creek near the Helena/Pelham city limits. Cahaba Valley Creek continues to the northeast, following the general orientation of the valley and ridge system of central Alabama to its source within Oak Mountain State Park. Cahaba Valley Creek is dammed to form Beaver Lake within Oak Mountain State Park. Also arising in Oak Mountain State Park, Peavine Creek joins Buck Creek upstream of Cahaba Valley Creek.

== Uses ==
Currently Buck Creek is used as a recreational resource and as the discharge point for municipal water treatment facilities in Helena and Pelham. Fishing, wading, and canoeing are popular uses of the waterway. Alabama Small Boats in Helena provides shuttle service and rental canoes for those wishing to canoe the creek. The Old Town Amphitheater park in Helena lines Buck Creek and is a popular spot for picnics and recreation. Annually the Buck Creek Festival is held at this park in late spring, drawing thousands of visitors. A historic marker for the Central Iron Works rolling mill, built on the banks of Buck Creek in 1865 and since destroyed, is at the intersection of Lake Davidson Road and Route 261 in Helena.

== Gallery ==
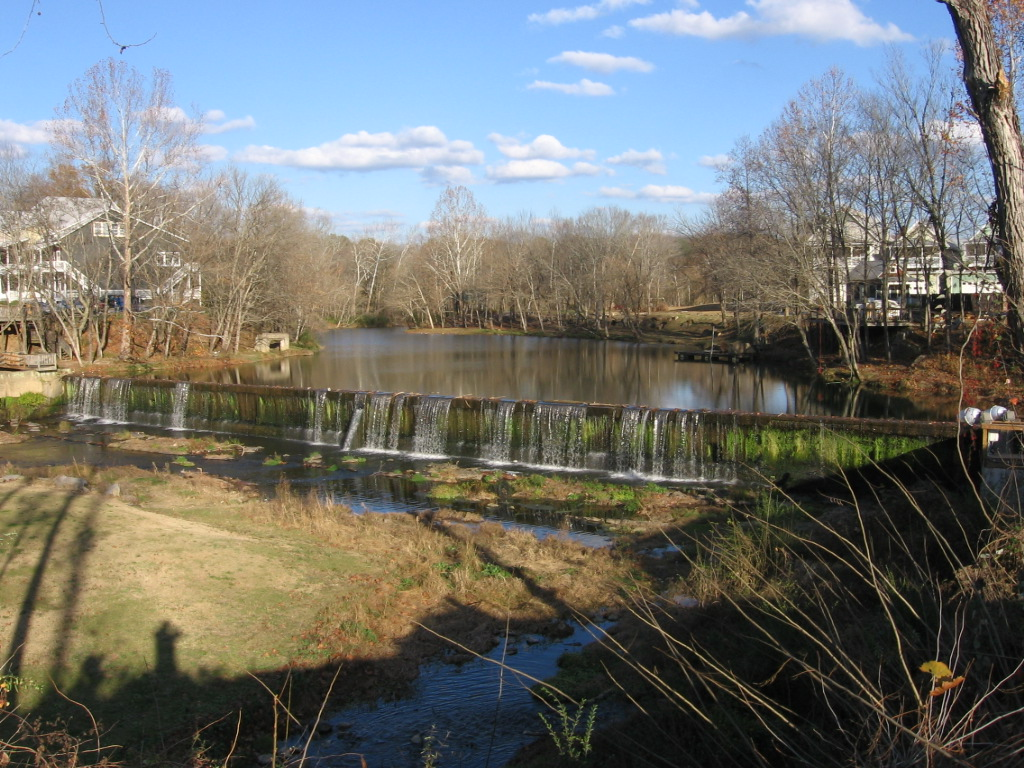
Buck Creek flows over the dam at Helena during fall low water period

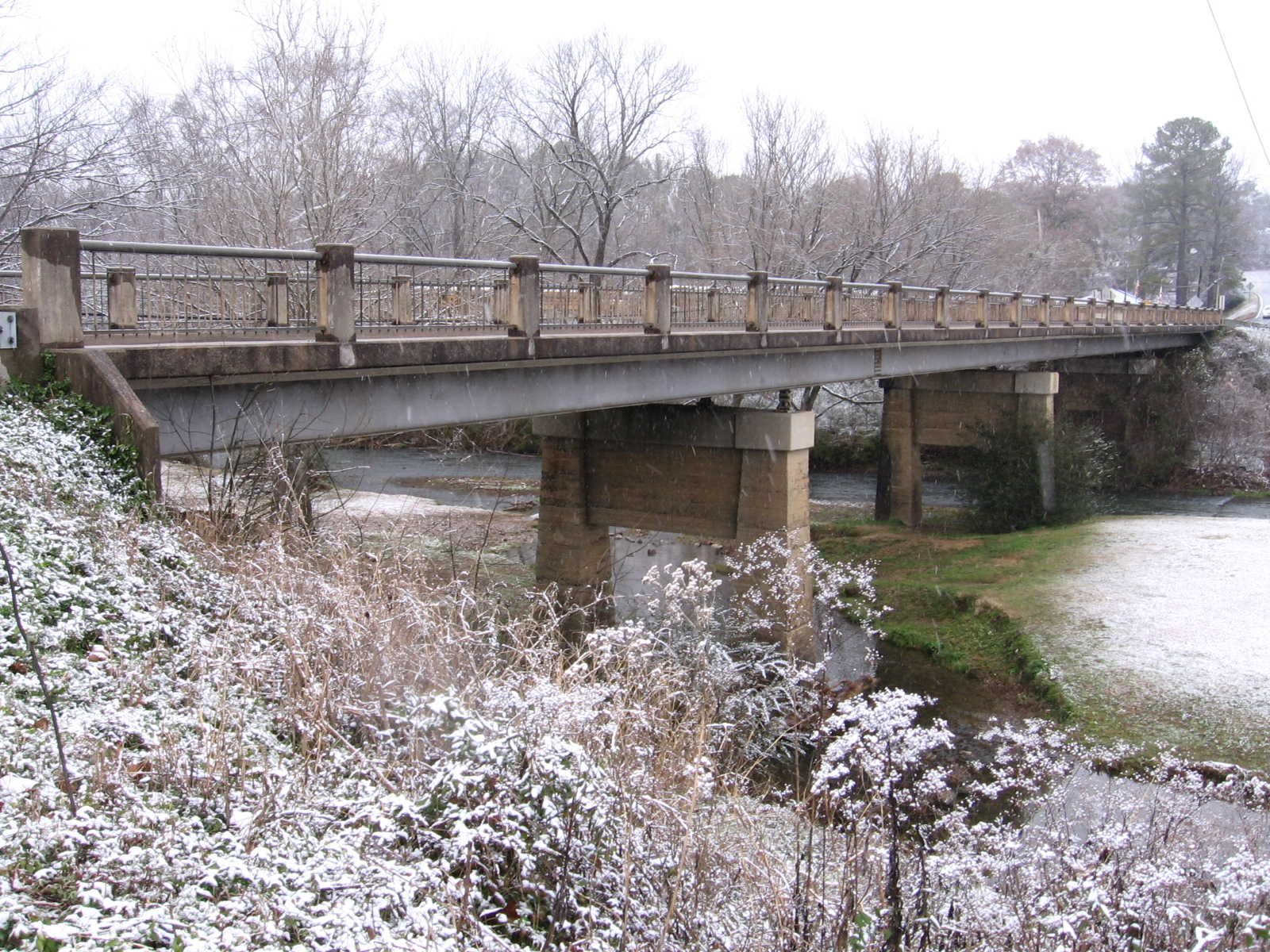
Alabama Highway 261 bridge across Buck Creek in Helena during a rare snowfall on January 19, 2008
