= Tumlin =

Tumlin is a surname. Notable people with the surname include:

- Houston Tumlin (1992–2021), American actor
- Steve Tumlin (born 1947), American politician
