= WFHK =

- Pell City, Alabama; United States
- Broadcast area: St. Clair County - Talladega County - Shelby County
- Frequency: 1430 kHz
- Branding: 94.1 The River

Programming
- Format: Adult contemporary
- Affiliations: Fox News Radio; Compass Media Networks; Premiere Networks

Ownership
- Owner: Stocks Broadcasting, Inc.

History
- First air date: January 7, 1956

Technical information
- Licensing authority: FCC
- Facility ID: 62109
- Class: D
- Power: 5,000 watts (days only)
- Transmitter coordinates: 33°35′19″N 86°19′15″W
- Translator: 94.1 W231CW (Pell City)

Links
- Public license information: Public file; LMS
- Webcast: Listen live
- Website: theriver941.com

WFHK (1430 AM, "94.1 The River") is a commercial radio station licensed to Pell City, Alabama, and airs an adult contemporary format. It is owned by Stocks Broadcasting, Inc., with studios on Cogswell Avenue (U.S. Route 78) in Pell City.

WFHK is a daytimer radio station. By day, it is powered at 5,000 watts using a non-directional antenna. But to protect other stations on 1430 AM from interference, it must go off the air at night. Programming is heard around the clock on 250-watt FM translator W231CW at 94.1 MHz. The primary coverage area of the AM signal includes St. Clair, Talladega and Shelby Counties. With a good radio, the AM station can be heard in Birmingham.

== History ==
=== Early years ===
The station was granted its original construction permit by the Federal Communications Commission on November 2, 1955. WFHK signed on the air on January 7, 1956.

In February 1999, St. Clair Broadcasting System, Inc. (Betty Williamson, president) reached an agreement to sell WFHK to Williamson Broadcasting, Inc. (Douglas Williamson, president). The station sold for a reported $10,000. The deal was approved by the FCC on April 14, 1999, and the transaction was consummated on May 14, 1999.

=== Stocks Broadcasting ===
In January 2001, Williamson Broadcasting, Inc., reached an agreement to sell WFHK to Stocks Broadcasting, Inc. The station sold for a reported $275,000. The deal was approved by the FCC on February 27, 2001, and the transaction was consummated on March 1, 2001.

Stocks Broadcasting owner Adam Stocks was elected mayor of Pell City in 2004.

On February 11, 2015, WFHK began simulcasting on FM translator W231CW. Using the FM dial position, it changed its moniker to "94.1 FM The River".

=== Awards and honors ===
In October 2001, WFHK was named Small Business of the Year for 2001 by the Greater Pell City Chamber of Commerce.

== Programming ==
WFHK plays AC hits of the 1970s, 80s, 90s and 2000s. The morning show is hosted by long-time radio partners John Simpson and Adam Stocks. Stocks is also the owner of Stocks Broadcasting, Inc. The two have been together on WFHK since 2000. John Simpson is on in middays, Adam Stocks covers afternoon drive time and Jeremy Gossett is heard in the evening.

On Saturday, Jennifer Jones hosts a 30-minute "Swap Shop" where callers buy, sell, trade and announce yard sales. Swap Shop has been running on WFHK since 1956. Birmingham radio veteran and television voice over talent Jim Lucas is on air the rest of the day. On Sundays, WFHK airs the 1980s edition of Rick Dees Weekly Top 40, a popular countdown show.
