= KPLR =

KPLR may refer to:

- KPLR-TV, a television station (channel 26, virtual 11) licensed to St. Louis, Missouri, United States
- KPLR-LP, a defunct low-power radio station (96.9 FM) licensed to Poplar, Montana, United States
- St. Clair County Airport (ICAO: KPLR), a public use airport
