= Cooks Springs, Alabama =

- Unincorporated community
- Location within Alabama Location within the United States
- Coordinates: 33°35′24″N 86°23′40″W
- Country: United States
- State: Alabama
- County: St. Clair
- Elevation: 541 ft (165 m)
- Time zone: UTC-6 (Central (CST))
  - Summer (DST): UTC-5 (CDT)
- ZIP code: 35052
- Area codes: 205, 659
- GNIS feature ID: 164613

Cooks Springs (also known as Cook Springs or Polk) is an unincorporated community in St. Clair County, Alabama, United States. Cooks Springs is located along Interstate 20 and U.S. Route 78, 6.3 miles (10.1 km) west of Pell City. Cooks Springs had a post office until November 19, 2011; it still has its own ZIP code, 35052. Cooks Springs was named for William Praytor Cooke, who settled here in 1854.

== Geography ==
The community is located along Interstate 20 west of Pell City, along a stretch of freeway commonly known as "Bloody 20" due to the significantly hilly ridges the freeway passes through, posing a threat to slowing truck traffic. Access to the community can be found from exit 152. Via I-20, Birmingham is 28 mi (45 km) west, and Atlanta, GA is 120 mi (193 km) east. U.S. Route 78 also runs through the community.
