= KJLL =

KJLL may refer to:

- KJLL-LP, a low-power radio station (107.7 FM) licensed to serve Hobbs, New Mexico, United States
- KWFM, a defunct radio station (1330 AM) formerly licensed to serve South Tucson, Arizona, United States, known as KJLL from 1999 through 2012
- KYLA, a radio station (92.7 FM) licensed to serve Fountain Valley, California, United States, known as KJLL-FM from 2007 through 2012
