= St. Clair County Airport =

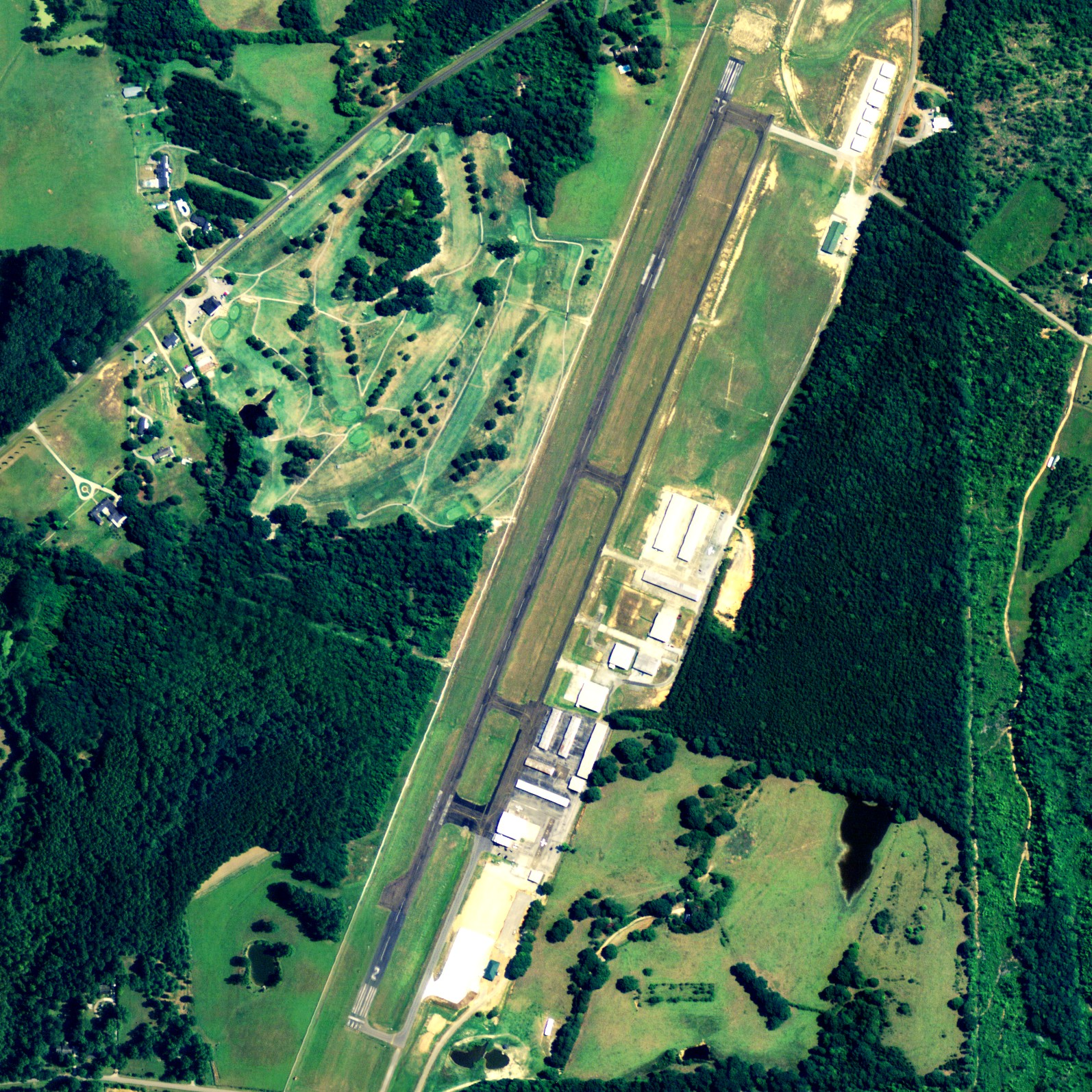
- NAIP aerial image, 2006
- IATA: PLR; ICAO: KPLR; FAA LID: PLR

Summary
- Airport type: Public
- Owner: St. Clair County Airport Authority
- Serves: Pell City, Alabama
- Elevation AMSL: 485 ft / 148 m
- Coordinates: 33°33′32″N 086°14′57″W
- Website: www.PLRairport.com
- Interactive map of St. Clair County Airport

Runways
Direction	Length		Surface
Direction	ft	m	Surface
3/21	5,001	1,524	Asphalt

Statistics (2009)
- Aircraft operations: 34,572
- Based aircraft: 81
- Source: Federal Aviation Administration

St. Clair County Airport (IATA: PLR, ICAO: KPLR, FAA LID: PLR) is a public use airport located three nautical miles (6 km) southeast of the central business district of Pell City, in St. Clair County, Alabama, United States. It is owned by the St. Clair County Airport Authority. According to the FAA's National Plan of Integrated Airport Systems for 2009–2013, it is categorized as a reliever airport for the Birmingham-Shuttlesworth International Airport.

== Facilities and aircraft ==
St. Clair County Airport covers an area of 200 acres (81 ha) at an elevation of 485 feet (148 m) above mean sea level. It has one runway designated 3/21 with an asphalt surface measuring 5,001 by 80 feet (1,524 x 24 m).

For the 12-month period ending January 22, 2009, the airport had 34,572 aircraft operations, an average of 94 per day: 97% general aviation and 3% military. At that time there were 81 aircraft based at this airport: 85% single-engine, 12% multi-engine, 1% helicopter and 1% ultralight.

Sammie's Touch-n-Go restaurant is located on the north end of the airport.

Holder Aviation, an avionics repair and installation company, is based at the airport.

== See also ==
- List of airports in Alabama
