= Rick Dees Weekly Top 40 =

Radio countdown show

- The Weekly Top 40 logo
- Genre: Music chart show
- Running time: Approx. 3 hrs. and 55 mins. (including commercials)
- Country of origin: United States
- Language: English
- Syndicates: Compass Media Networks (domestic); Radio Express (international)
- Hosted by: Rick Dees; Kevin Dees; Various guest hosts
- Original release: September 1983 – present
- Audio format: Stereophonic sound
- Website: rick.com

Rick Dees Weekly Top 40 (sometimes known as The Weekly Top 40) is an internationally syndicated radio program created and hosted by American radio personality Rick Dees. It is currently heard on over 200 radio stations worldwide. It is distributed domestically by Compass Media Networks and internationally by Radio Express. It is also heard on Dees's official website for listeners in the United States only.

The Weekly Top 40 countdown is available in two versions: Hit Radio (for Top 40 stations), and Hot Adult (for Hot AC stations). A version for AC stations called Weekly Top 30 debuted in July 2009; it has since been cut to 20 songs. From 2006-2008, a version made specifically for Rhythmic AC stations existed, which consisted of older rhythmic songs alongside current hits (with very few hip-hop/rap songs charting).

== History ==
The Weekly Top 40 debuted in September 1983, after Rick's then-station, KIIS-FM, lost American Top 40 to a rival station, KIQQ (now KKLQ) over the playing of network commercials. (KIIS-FM re-obtained the rights to carry AT40 in 1988, after Shadoe Stevens took over as host.) Initially syndicated by United Stations, the show was initially heard on 10 stations, but expanded to 40 by the end of 1983. By the end of 1984, the show expanded to 275 stations in the United States, and 320 stations by the following year.

Part of the Weekly Top 40's appeal in the '80s - and how it differentiated itself from the more sober AT40 - was Rick's colorful, signature use of goofy sound effects and comedy voices, often at the end of each segment before commercial breaks. The voice impressions were by Rick and his wife Julie (a voice actor) as well as other mimics, and included characters imported from Rick's popular morning show on KIIS-FM.

Characters heard on the Weekly Top 40 through the '80s and beyond included "talent booking agent" Bernie Shelley of "Possessive Artists" and his ditzy receptionist; countdown "technician" and wino Willard Wiseman; snide gossip columnist Groanin' Barrett; snappy workout guru Jane Fondle with her Radio Aerobics; call-in airhead John Revolting; salivating agony aunt "Crabby"; tittering sex therapist Dr. Rude (a spoof of popular radio and TV sex therapist Dr. Ruth Westheimer (Dr. Ruth)); and "Joan's Clone", a take-off of comedian Joan Rivers.

Other comedy routines were "Outrageous!" Facts (inspired by Lionel Richie's reaction to Prince at the 1985 American Music Awards), and "News of the Offbeat", a punchline gag introduced by Rick quoting from bizarre supermarket tabloid stories. Dees Sleaze, a jokey recycling of an item of Hollywood gossip, was often accompanied by the lisping voice of Rick's "boss" at the radio station.

In the '80s, the countdown would open with John Williams's theme to the 1978 film Superman, with Dees reciting an alternative version of the classic Adventures of Superman opening narration: "...and who, disguised as Rick Dees, mild-mannered disc jockey, fights a never-ending battle for truth, justice, and the pursuit of loose women." By 1988 the show's IDs included voice impressions of former hit songs (early examples were Cyndi Lauper's "True Colors", Michael Jackson's "The Way You Make Me Feel", George Michael's "Faith", and 'Need You Tonight" by INXS). Other commonly heard sound effects were Little Richard's throaty belly laugh, Michael Jackson's falsetto squeal, James Brown's lines "Believe me that's bad" and "I feel good", and the Joan's Clone exclamations "Yuck!" and "She's a tramp!!".

A contest (the Weekly Top 40 Challenge) and a pre-recorded interview ("special in-studio guest") were other enduring features that helped give Rick's show a younger more contemporary sound when compared to American Top 40. By 1985, the Rick Dees Weekly Top 40 could be heard on radio stations around the world as far away as New Zealand.

After ABC Radio Networks pulled AT40 from American stations in July 1994, it picked up the Weekly Top 40 for national syndication. In January 2000, Weekly Top 40 moved to Premiere Radio Networks (the same company that owned AT40) until 2005, when Dees left KIIS-FM and its owner Clear Channel Communications, which owned Premiere (Dees had apparently been passed over as Casey Kasem's successor at AT40 in favor of current host Ryan Seacrest, which may have played a role in his departure).

The Weekly Top 40 moved its distribution over to Dial Global from 2005 to 2008. It has been streamed on Dees's official website since 2006. From 2017, streaming was limited to listeners in the United States with a smartphone app installed; previously it had been available internationally, and was able to be streamed directly from the rick.com website.

In January 2009, Dees and the Weekly Top 40 returned to ABC Radio, which has since been acquired by Citadel Broadcasting, with ABC Radio's programming division renamed as Citadel Media.

Reruns of the Rick Dees Weekly Top 40 from the 1980s began airing on the TKO Radio Network in 2010 after a trial run on WQMA in Marks, Mississippi. A few stations under the "Gen X" moniker air old '90s versions of the countdown starting in summer of 2010. As of 2020, KZOY in Sioux Falls, South Dakota, WBAF in Barnesville, Georgia, WFXY in Middlesboro, Kentucky, WFHK in Pell City, Alabama, KXGL in Amarillo, Texas, KQEO in Idaho Falls, Idaho, WIGY-AM in Lewiston, Maine, WKVI in Knox, Indiana, WZON in Bangor, Maine, KWFM in Tucson, Arizona, and WBRX in Cresson, Pennsylvania are the only notable stations to air reruns of the 1980s versions. Recently the AC version of the countdown was shortened to the Weekly Top 20.

On February 1, 2011, it was announced that the Weekly Top 40 franchise switched syndication to the Westwood One radio network (former syndicator for Casey's Top 40), returning to Dial Global after the latter merged in October 2011. The new syndication deal included additional programming in the franchise, including "The Daily Dees", "Rick Dees 80s and 8", "Rick Dees 90s at 9", repeats of past editions of "Weekly Top 40", and the "Teen Top 20 with Kevin Dees".

On October 25, 2012, it was announced that Dees Entertainment properties switched syndication again to the Compass Media Networks radio network.

In early 2017, for unknown reasons, both the Weekly Top 40 Hot AC and CHR charts were removed from the rick.com website.

The show is no longer available in the United Kingdom and Ireland, but in the 1980s and 1990s it aired on Northsound and West Sound as part of the Nova Night Network, Metro Radio and TFM, City FM, Aire FM, Pennine Radio and its successor The Pulse of West Yorkshire, Viking FM, Hallam FM, Mercia FM, Buzz FM, Kix 96, Cool FM and also Downtown Radio, Trent FM, Power FM, Radio Broadland, SGR FM and 98FM in Dublin.

In December 2023, Rick Dees Weekly Top 40 was once again broadcast in Ireland, on Classic Hits 80s, a temporary radio station licensed by the Irish regulator Coimisiún na Meán to broadcast on FM to the four main cities in Ireland for 30 days. The temporary station was run by multicity broadcaster Ireland's Classic Hits Radio. Rick Dees' Weekly Top 40 was broadcast each day on the new station, evoking fond memories in Ireland of the show's run on the iconic Radio Nova and Energy 103 radio stations that broadcast from Dublin in the 1980s, both owned by radio entrepreneur Chris Cary.

Rick Dees Entertainment would also sign a deal with iHeartMedia in March 2025 enabling the company to access the Weekly Top 40 archival materials, including the immediate addition of 2 webstreams of the show on iHeartRadio, one focused on current/recurrent broadcasts and a "Classic" channel with old broadcasts from the 1980s to 2000s. Dees would also promote the deal personally by reuniting briefly with his former KIIS-FM cohost Ellen K during her show on KOST-FM on March 21 of that year.

== Segments aired on the Weekly Top 40 ==
- Sure Shot - a song predicted to crack the Top 40 in the following weeks. Additionally, listeners can vote on one of three songs (via the show's website) to determine that week's Sure Shot. There have been numerous Sure Shots that did not make the chart
- Special Guest - Charting artists, actors, etc. would appear weekly as guests in the show
- Weekly Top 40 Challenge - during the program, listeners will claim a prize by correctly identifying items such as a sound clip from a song, messages from charting artists, among other clues
- Behind the Velvet Rope with Kevin Dees - a gossip segment hosted by Rick's son Kevin; previously known as Dees Sleaze, hosted by Rick himself.
- What's Happening - a rundown of new movies, DVDs and music
- Number Ones Around the World - a look at the Number One song in various nations for that week
- Top Downloads - the hottest music, ringtones, TV shows and videos being downloaded from the Internet.
  - Planet of the Apps - the latest news on mobile smartphone applications.

=== Omitted songs ===
Occasionally, songs charting in the Top 40 (mostly in the hip-hop/rap genre at the request of Hot AC-leaning affiliates) would be omitted and "replaced" by a song peaking under the top 40 on whatever chart source at the time. Notable “replacements” have included "Antes Muerta Que Sencilla" by María Isabel, "El Baile Del Gorilla" by Melody, "Shot of Laughter" by Sugar Ray, "Vamos al Mundial" by Jennifer Peña, "Word Up!" by Korn and "Work" by Jimmy Eat World, all of which never charted on Radio & Records CHR/Pop chart (the show’s chart source at the time). Also, Dees would often skip charted songs by just announcing their chart status (mainly older songs) due to time constraints, with Dees usually playing a newer song, a listener request or a previous Sure Shot in their place. Additionally, Spanish-language songs, at the request of affiliates in Hispanic-leaning markets, were sometimes used as Sure Shots or charted songs solely for that week (usually to replace an outgoing hip-hop/rap song).

=== Running gags ===
Before introducing a song on a chart, Dees would often play a montage (other songs, soundbites from films/TV shows, etc.) related to the song’s title/artist (done usually before the first song played after a commercial break). Additionally, most of the time, Dees would edit charted songs to include altered lyrics that were usually comedic in nature (by Dees and his staff), these edits are sometimes known as the "Countdown Mix". A running joke also occurs during the Weekly Top 40 Challenge, whenever it has a sponsor for that week, Dees would precede it by saying "because this show has no budget!" (This is similar in context to the Inside the NBA segment E.J.'s Neat-O Stat of the Night, where it is known for its similar lack of continued sponsorship).

== Spinoff ==
In February 1985, Dees created and hosted a syndicated weekday music program for United Stations, American Music Magazine — the daily, hour-long program was similar to his countdown show, except that it played the "most requested songs", as phoned in by listeners to an 800 number hotline. The songs were not typically played in countdown fashion, but the most requested was always played at the end of the show. As with most syndicated radio programs, the shows were distributed to radio stations in collector-type boxes—which has been most helpful in keeping the shows in good condition for collectors—by United Stations Programming Network on five LPs, one for each day of the week. Each week's box of LPs typically contained two promo spots: one for weekdays and one for the weekends.

The show was produced in a "faux-live" style. Dees encouraged callers to "call in" to the show, and often pre-recorded calls and caller montages aired as though listeners were actually calling in at the time of broadcast, even though these shows were recorded and distributed to stations at least a week ahead of the air date.

Often these shows featured celebrity guests (either call-in or in-studio) who were promoting events, movies, TV shows or albums un-related to the show. Guests included Patrick Swayze, Milli Vanilli, Jon Provost of Lassie, Cher's mother, etc.

At the end of 1988, Dees left the program and was replaced by Bruce Vidal, who regularly subbed for Dees on his countdown show. Around this time, stations could play the program an hour a day on weekdays, or, for weekend airplay, as a single five-hour block, or as a two-hour and a three-hour block. It is unknown when "American Music Magazine" left the air, though at least one show from June 5, 1989 has surfaced in online show trading.
