= WQMA =

- Marks, Mississippi; United States
- Broadcast area: Mississippi Delta
- Frequency: 1520 kHz

Programming
- Language: English
- Format: Oldies

Ownership
- Owner: Jason Konarz

History
- First air date: December 1, 1969
- Last air date: May 20, 2015
- Call sign meaning: Quitman County

Technical information
- Facility ID: 1219
- Class: D
- Power: 250 watts daytime only
- Transmitter coordinates: 34°15′42″N 90°17′18″W

WQMA was a broadcast radio station licensed to Marks, Mississippi. The station was owned by Jason Konarz with an oldies format on 1520 kHz. Its Federal Communications Commission (FCC) license was cancelled May 31, 2006. WQMA had operated under special temporary authority from the FCC, but it was denied August 20, 2010. The station exhausted its appeal options, and its application for license renewal was dismissed by the FCC on May 20, 2015. WQMA was a daytime-only station, but was heard on the internet 24 hours a day.

== Programming ==
WQMA broadcast national programming all weekend long that included:

- Foundcuts with Dave Newfell
- Relics and Rarities with Dave The Rave
- Both of Steve Goddard's programs, Goddard's Gold and The 70s
- Flashback with Bill St. James
- SuperGold with Mike Harvey (aired on a six-day delay on Friday nights)

The station also aired three consecutive countdown shows, each from a different decade in succession on Saturday:

- National Countdown Show with Al Gross (a countdown from the 1950s or 1960s)
- Casey Kasem's American Top 40: The 70s
- Rick Dees Weekly Top 40: The 80s

Former programming included:

- Dick Clark's Rock, Roll & Remember (in 2004 Dick Clark suffered a stroke, thus the show was cancelled by the network after several years of reruns)
- Dick Bartley's American Gold (changed networks, WQMA declined to pick show up)
- Ross Brittain's Weekend Hit Machine (canceled by network)
- American Top 10 with Casey Kasem (Kasem retired; replaced by AT40 reruns)
- Dr. Demento (pulled show from WQMA over a dispute over rights fees and Internet streaming, show is now Internet only)
- DC and the Family (former morning show, no reason given for discontinuation)

WQMA also broadcast local programming including a "8-Track Thursday" feature with owner Jason Konarz, with music played from 8-track cartridges all afternoon. The "Gospel Train With James Figgs", "Guest DJ Day" where local residents could be a DJ, and previously Delta Academy sports play-by-play. The station broadcast daily features like "All Things Southern" and the "Old Farmers Almanac Radio Report".

In the past, on New Year's Eve, WQMA aired a marathon of Rock, Roll and Remember episodes, interspersed with audio clips of past episodes of Dick Clark's New Year's Rockin' Eve.
