= Cropwell, Alabama =

- Neighborhood
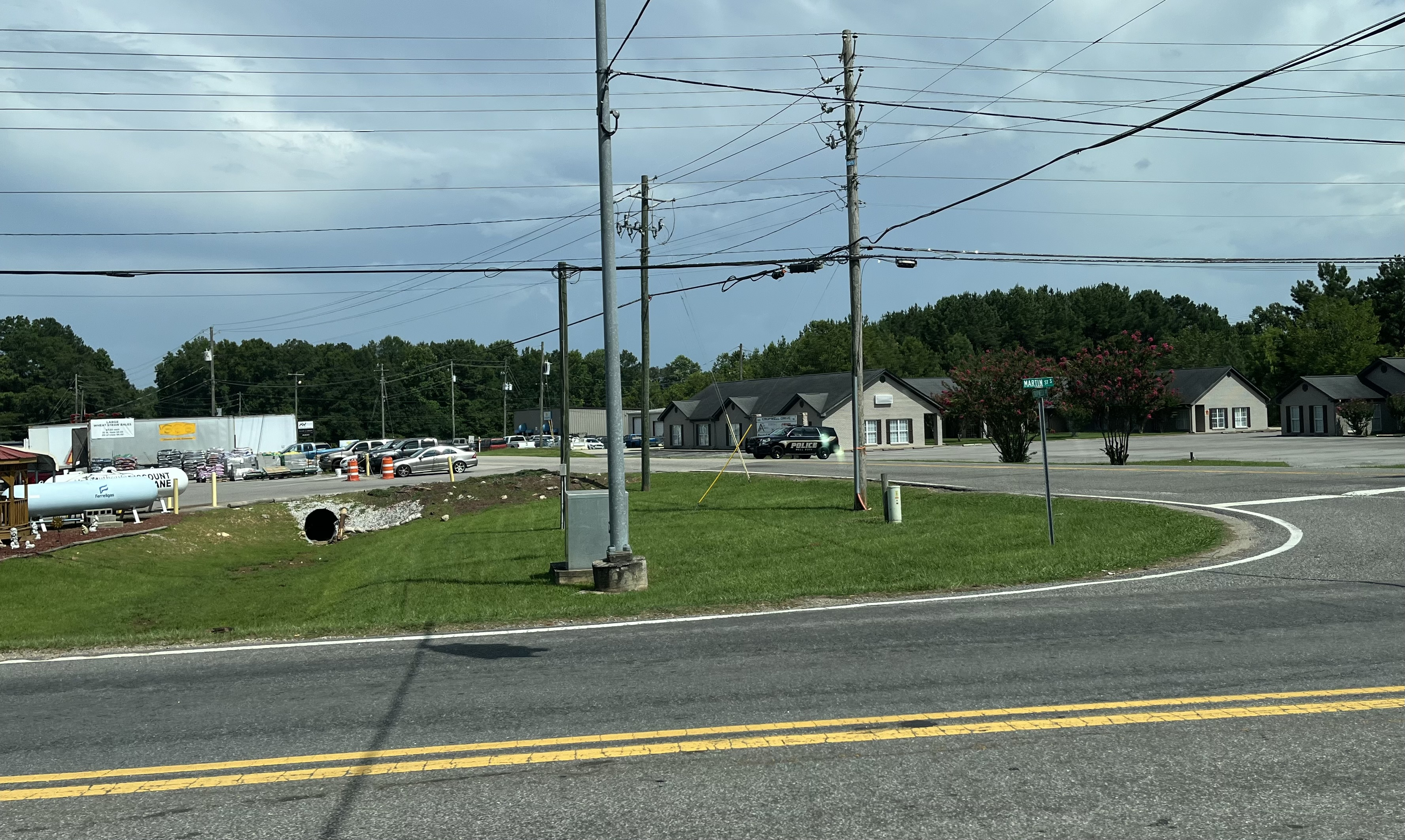
- Cropwell along US Route 231

- Location within Alabama
- Coordinates: 33°33′08″N 86°16′09″W
- Country: United States
- State: Alabama
- County: St. Clair
- Elevation: 479 ft (146 m)
- Time zone: UTC-6 (Central (CST))
  - Summer (DST): UTC-5 (CDT)
- ZIP code: 35054
- Area codes: 205, 659
- GNIS feature ID: 164624

Cropwell, also known as Coosa or Coosa Valley, is a neighborhood of Pell City, Alabama, United States. Cropwell is a small town and an unincorporated community. Cropwell is located along Alabama State Route 34, 2.5 miles (4.0 km) south-southwest of downtown Pell City. Cropwell has its own post office with ZIP code 35054. Cropwell was originally called Coosa or Coosa Valley until 1837, when it began to be called Cropwell. A post office operated under the name Coosa during 1833 and 1834. A post office was then established under the name Cropwell in 1837.

== Demographics ==
Historical population
Census	Pop.	Note	%±
1880	105		—
U.S. Decennial Census

Cropwell appeared on the 1880 U.S. Census with 105 residents. The population in Cropwell is 3,936. There are 151 people per square mile. The median age in Cropwell is 52.5. The U.S. median age is 37.4. The number of people per household in Cropwell is 2.2. The U.S. average of people per household is 2.6.
