= Prescott, Alabama =

- Unincorporated community
- Location within Alabama Location within the United States
- Coordinates: 33°34′06″N 86°26′45″W
- Country: United States
- State: Alabama
- County: St. Clair
- Elevation: 577 ft (176 m)
- Time zone: UTC-6 (Central (CST))
  - Summer (DST): UTC-5 (CDT)
- Area codes: 205, 659
- GNIS feature ID: 164821

Prescott is an unincorporated community in St. Clair County, Alabama, United States.

== History ==
In 2015, the residents of Prescott sold the community center to the St. Clair County Commission. The community center is still used as a voting site.

A post office operated under the name Prescott from 1914 to 1918.
