= Pell City High School =

School in Alabama, United States

Coordinates: 33.58395°N 86.29320°W

Location
- 1300 Cogswell Ave; Pell City, Alabama 35125; United States

Information
- Type: Public
- Established: 1912 (114 years ago)
- School district: Pell City School District
- CEEB code: 012115
- Teaching staff: 68.25 (FTE)
- Grades: 9-12
- Enrollment: 1,215 (2023–2024)
- Student to teacher ratio: 17.80
- Colors: Black and gold
- Nickname: Panthers
- Website: pchs.pellcityschools.net

Pell City High School is the only public high school serving the Pell City School District. The school has approx. 1,813 students in grades 9-12 and just recently finished adding on a $7.5 million multi-purpose building which houses a 2200-seat sports arena as well as a 400-seat theatre. The school offers an advanced diploma track that allows students to take honors classes in math, and the sciences, and honors or AP classes in English, Chemistry, and History. The school partners with the local community college to allow some students to take freshman college courses half a school day or at night.

== Sports ==
The Pell City School colors are black and gold and their mascot is a black panther. The Panthers participate in AHSAA Class 6A. The Panthers field teams in the band, football, men's and women's tennis, men's and women's soccer, men's and women's basketball, baseball, softball, men's and women's golf, outdoor track, cross country, bass fishing, women's volleyball, and cheerleading.

== Facilities ==
The football and soccer teams all play at Pete Rich Stadium and the band performs their halftime show during football games there as well. The volleyball and basketball teams all play in the gymnasium located in the Center for Education and Performing Arts, more commonly referred to as the CEPA. The Baseball and Softball teams both have their own fields located behind the Jr. High School, and the golf teams play at the Pell City Country Club.
