= Talladega Nights: The Ballad of Ricky Bobby =

2006 American sports comedy film

- Theatrical release poster
- Directed by: Adam McKay
- Written by: Will Ferrell; Adam McKay
- Produced by: Jimmy Miller; Judd Apatow
- Starring: Will Ferrell; John C. Reilly; Sacha Baron Cohen; Gary Cole; Michael Clarke Duncan
- Cinematography: Oliver Wood
- Edited by: Brent White
- Music by: Alex Wurman
- Production companies: Columbia Pictures; Relativity Media; The Apatow Company; Mosaic Media Group
- Distributed by: Sony Pictures Releasing
- Release date: August 4, 2006
- Running time: 108 minutes
- Country: United States
- Language: English
- Budget: $72.5 million
- Box office: $163.4 million

Talladega Nights: The Ballad of Ricky Bobby is a 2006 American sports comedy film directed by Adam McKay who co-wrote the film with Will Ferrell. It features Ferrell as the titular Ricky Bobby, an immature yet successful NASCAR driver. The film also features John C. Reilly, Sacha Baron Cohen, Gary Cole, Michael Clarke Duncan, Leslie Bibb, Jane Lynch, and Amy Adams in supporting roles. NASCAR drivers Jamie McMurray and Dale Earnhardt Jr. appear in cameos, as do broadcasting teams from NASCAR on Fox (Mike Joy, Larry McReynolds, Darrell Waltrip, and Dick Berggren) and NASCAR on NBC (Bill Weber, Wally Dallenbach Jr., and Benny Parsons).

The film was released theatrically on August 4, 2006, by Columbia Pictures through Sony Pictures Releasing to positive reviews from critics, who praised the story, sharp satire, humor, cast performances, the chemistry between Ferrell and Reilly, and the authentic yet absurd portrayal of NASCAR. It was a commercial success, grossing $163.4 million worldwide against a $72.5 million budget. Since its release, the film has become a cult classic and regarded as one of Will Ferrell's best films.

== Plot ==
In rural North Carolina, Ricky Bobby is born in the backseat of a speeding Chevrolet Chevelle when his father, Reese, misses the turnoff for the hospital. Ricky sees Reese only once after that, at age 10, for career day at his school. Reese tells Ricky, "If you ain't first, you're last", advice which Ricky takes to heart. Fifteen years later, Ricky works on the pit crew of Dennit Racing driver Terry Cheveaux. When last-placed Cheveaux decides to take a bathroom break, Ricky replaces him and finishes third. Larry Dennit Sr. gives Ricky a permanent seat and he quickly rises to be one of NASCAR's most successful drivers. He meets his future wife Carley when she flashes her breasts after one of his wins.

Ricky persuades Dennit to field a second team for his best friend, Cal Naughton Jr., and they become an unstoppable duo using their "Slingshot" drafting technique on the track. Ricky's newfound arrogance, however, irritates Dennit's alienated son, who retaliates by adding talented, openly gay French Formula One driver Jean Girard to the team. Girard not only taunts Ricky, but outperforms him and becomes Dennit's top driver. Desperate to beat Girard, Ricky crashes at Upper Darby Motor Speedway. Although unscathed, he is traumatized and hospitalized. Fearful of wrecking again, his performance drastically declines and Dennit fires him. Carley leaves him for Cal, who still considers Ricky his best friend, but Ricky insists that their friendship is over.

Ricky and his two unruly sons, Regis and Texas Ranger, move in with Ricky's disciplinarian mother Lucy, who is determined to reform the boys. Ricky takes a job delivering pizzas, but after he loses his Upper Darby driver's license he is reduced to delivering pizza by bus or by bicycle. When his life hits rock bottom, Reese returns and uses unorthodox methods (including putting a live cougar in his car) to help Ricky regain his confidence and get a new license. After causing trouble at an Applebee's restaurant, Reese abandons the family again. Before he does, he refutes his quote that has steered Ricky's life, confessing that it was nonsense because he was high on drugs at the time. Ricky's former assistant, Alyssa, persuades him to return to NASCAR and they quickly develop a romantic relationship. On race day at Talladega Superspeedway, Ricky is reunited with his pit crew, who have emblazoned Ricky's unsponsored car with a cougar and the word "ME" to build his self-confidence. Ricky meets with Girard, who confesses that he came to America hoping to lose to a superior driver so he can finally retire. Ricky also makes amends with Cal.

During the race, Ricky climbs from last to second behind Girard. In the final laps, however, Dennit orders Cal to knock Ricky out of the race. Cal refuses and instead helps Ricky pass Girard. Dennit then orders Ricky's replacement driver, Brian Wavecrest, to take Cal out, causing a massive wreck that eliminates everyone except Ricky and Girard. On the final lap, Ricky and Girard collide, wrecking their cars. They hastily exit their vehicles and run towards the finish line. Ricky dives across the line first, and Girard offers him a handshake, but Ricky responds by kissing him on the lips. Both drivers, however, are disqualified for exiting their cars. Cal, who was in third place, is declared the winner. Following his victory, Cal and Ricky reconcile, and Reese congratulates Ricky, who says that it was no longer about winning, since his family loves him no matter where he finishes. Ricky, his family and Susan leave to go to Arby's and Applebee's.

In a post credits scene, Lucy is shown reading a William Faulkner story to Regis and Texas Ranger, both of whom are now respectful, sophisticated children.

== Cast ==
- Will Ferrell as Ricky Bobby, the protagonist, a NASCAR driver who only believes in winning throughout his career. He originally drove the #26 Laughing Clown Malt Liquor Chevrolet car until it became sponsored by Wonder Bread and Powerade during his soar to the top of NASCAR and the #62 ME Ford car at the Talladega 500 at the end of the movie.
  - Jake Johnson as 5-year-old Ricky in the theatrical version.
  - Luke Bigham as 10-year-old Ricky.
- John C. Reilly as Cal Naughton Jr., Bobby's best friend and teammate. He drives the #47 Old Spice Chevrolet car.
  - Austin Crim as 10-year-old Cal.
- Sacha Baron Cohen as Jean Girard, the main antagonist, an openly gay French Formula One driver, Gregory's husband and Bobby's archrival. Girard's dream is to move to Stockholm and design a currency for use by dogs and cats. He is described as talented, eccentric and dominating in the Formula One circuit in a SPEED broadcast segment. While challenging Bobby, Girard drives the #55 Perrier Chevrolet car.
- Gary Cole as Reese Bobby, Ricky's father.
- Michael Clarke Duncan as Lucius Washington, Ricky's crew chief and close friend. After Ricky's firing, he and the pit crew started a car wash, where they had a hard time adjusting to the career change. They eventually return as the pit crew of Ricky's ME car.
- Leslie Bibb as Carley Bobby/Naughton, Ricky's trophy wife, who eventually leaves him to marry Cal after she fears Ricky will not successfully return to NASCAR.
- Jane Lynch as Lucy Bobby, Ricky's mother.
- Amy Adams as Susan, Ricky's assistant and eventual love interest.
- Andy Richter as Gregory, Girard's husband and a world-class trainer of German shepherds.
- Molly Shannon as Mrs. Dennit, the younger Dennit's alcoholic wife.
- Greg Germann as Larry Dennit Jr., the current owner of Dennit Racing, who is concerned only with season point totals and winning sponsors, and dislikes Ricky and his antics.
- David Koechner, Jack McBrayer and Ian Roberts as Hershell, Glenn and Kyle, Bobby's three pit crew members. They join Lucius at the car wash before returning to be Ricky's pit crew. Though Glenn was initially claimed to have died while working on the car, he is revealed to still be alive, and had pretended to die as extra motivation for Ricky to win.
- Houston Tumlin and Grayson Russell as Walker and Texas Ranger Bobby, Ricky's and Carley's two sons.
- Adam McKay (the film's director and co-scriptwriter) as Terry Cheveaux, an apathetic driver who is replaced by Bobby at the beginning of the film.
- Pat Hingle as Larry Dennit Sr., original owner of Bobby's team, Dennit Racing who considers Ricky to be a son. After retiring, his son, Larry Dennit Jr., takes over the team halfway through Bobby's career.
- Ed Lauter as John Hanafin
- Ted Manson as Chip, Bobby's elderly, long-suffering former father-in-law.
- Rob Riggle as Jack Telmont, the Speed Channel commentator.
- C.J. Dornberger as Brian Wavecrest, who replaces Bobby in the 26 car at the end of the film and he was originally driven #86 Mopar Dodge before he was hired by Dennit Racing.
- Elvis Costello and Mos Def as guests at Girard's party.
- Jack Blessing as Jarvis, Cal's crew chief.
- Greg Biffle appears in a special feature but is not credited in the film.

The broadcasters and various real-life NASCAR drivers and their cars from the 2005 NASCAR season can also be seen, including: Drivers: Dale Jarrett, Dale Earnhardt Jr., Kasey Kahne, Tony Stewart, J. J. Yeley, Jason Leffler, Brian Vickers, Jeff Gordon, Jimmie Johnson, Kyle Busch, Boris Said, Tony Raines, Mike Wallace, Kerry Earnhardt, Jeff Green, and Jamie McMurray

Cars only: Casey Mears, Jeremy Mayfield, Bobby Labonte, Terry Labonte, Travis Kvapil, Mark Martin, Carl Edwards, Mike Bliss, Scott Wimmer, Jamie McMurray, Rusty Wallace, Kurt Busch, Elliott Sadler, Greg Biffle, Matt Kenseth, Michael Waltrip, Ryan Newman, Scott Riggs, Joe Nemechek, Sterling Marlin, Jeff Burton, Ken Schrader, Kevin Lepage, Mike Skinner, Kenny Wallace, Bobby Hamilton Jr., Hermie Sadler, Robby Gordon, Kevin Harvick, Kyle Petty, and Johnny Sauter.

Broadcasters: Mike Joy, Darrell Waltrip, Larry McReynolds, Dick Berggren, Bill Weber, Benny Parsons, Wally Dallenbach Jr., Bob Jenkins and Rick Benjamin

== Production ==
=== Development ===
Adam McKay and Will Ferrell first discussed a comedic film about a NASCAR driver while Ferrell was making Elf. Shortly after that film had wrapped, co-producer Jimmy Miller invited them to a NASCAR race in Fontana, California, after which McKay and Ferrell began writing the script. They presented the idea to studios using only a six-word pitch: "Will Ferrell as a NASCAR driver". Studios responded enthusiastically to the pitch largely due to Ferrell's recent commercial success as a comedic leading man in films like Elf, Old School and Anchorman. After a bidding war, the rights were won by Sony Pictures. McKay and Ferrell knew that in order to make the film they envisioned they would need cooperation from NASCAR. After meeting with the filmmakers, NASCAR agreed to provide assistance for the film's production. McKay and Ferrell sought to make a film that individuals involved with NASCAR would enjoy in the same way that people in the television news industry enjoyed Anchorman. Ferrell stated, "We were real adamant up front that our goal wasn't to make fun of NASCAR. We wanted to have fun with NASCAR." Despite NASCAR's involvement, many teams and drivers were reluctant to participate largely due to the negative feelings they had for the 1990 film Days of Thunder. Only two drivers ended up making cameos in the film: Dale Earnhardt Jr. and Jamie McMurray. During development, the film's title changed from Talladega Nights to High, Wide and Handsome before eventually reverting to the original title.

=== Filming ===
With the exception of one week of shooting at Talladega Superspeedway in Alabama, the entire film was filmed in North Carolina with the majority of filming occurring in the Charlotte Metropolitan Area. Many of the racing scenes were filmed at the Charlotte Motor Speedway in Concord, North Carolina and Rockingham Speedway, also known as The Rock. Various other scenes were filmed in the Gaston County, North Carolina area, including the Pizza Delivery, DMV Driving Test, and Church Choir scenes. The Pizza Delivery sequence began in Downtown Cramerton, North Carolina and concluded at the Midtown Motor Inn in Gastonia, North Carolina. Both the DMV Driving Test and the Church Choir scenes were filmed on the campus of First Baptist Church in Cramerton, North Carolina. Scenes at The Pit Stop, the bar the characters frequent and Ricky Bobby and Jean Girard first meet were filmed in a recently closed sports bar in Charlotte. The scenes for the Bobby residence were filmed at a mansion on Lake Norman.

McKay was adamant about wanting to incorporate stunts in the movie, and even had Ferrell and Reilly take driving classes at the Richard Petty Driving Experience with Ferrell later stating that he was "terrified" while driving the cars. Andy Hillenburg's Fast Track Enterprises and K4 Motorsports combined to provide race cars, hauler transportation and stunt coordination. Previously, the companies had assisted in promotion for Herbie: Fully Loaded, 3: The Dale Earnhardt Story, and other stock car racing films. Within Talladega Nights: The Ballad of Ricky Bobby, K4 Motorsports created custom wrapping for specific race cars, notably Bobby's "ME" car. Sacha Baron Cohen claimed he based his portrayal of 'Jean Girard' on Philippe Gaulier.

== Reception ==
=== Box office ===
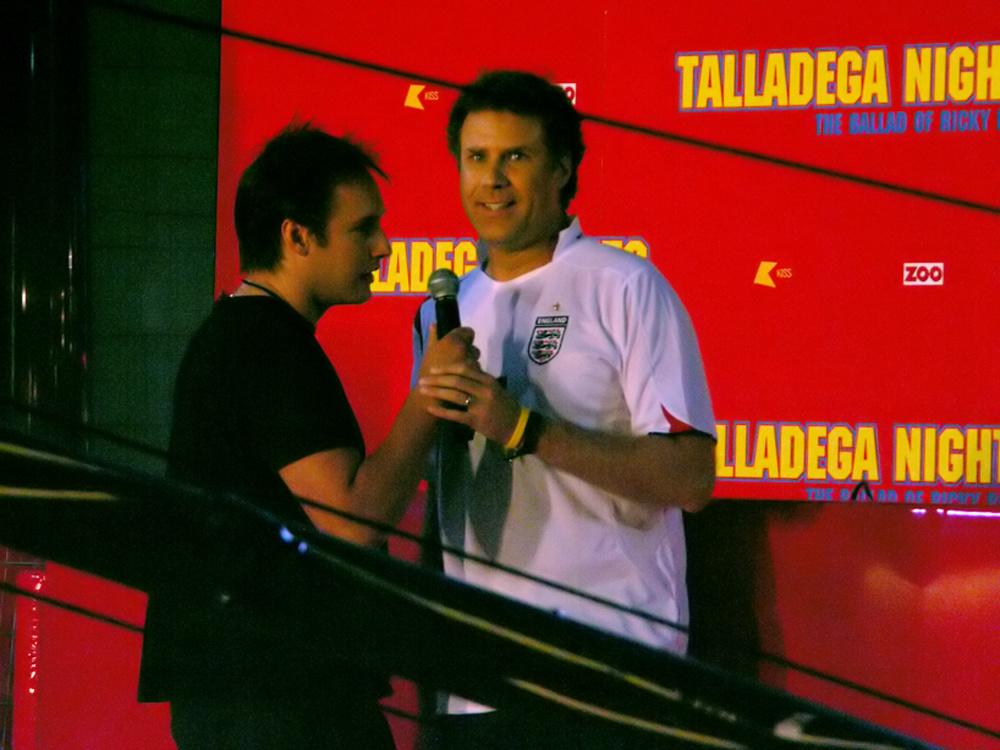
Ferrell at the UK premiere of Talladega Nights, September 12, 2006

The film grossed US$47 million in its first week, and was the No. 1 film at the box office, making it at the time, the largest opening weekend of Ferrell's career, before being passed by 2014's The Lego Movie. The film grossed $148.2 million in the United States and Canada, and $15.1 million in other territories for a total worldwide gross of $163 million, at the time Ferrell's second highest-grossing film (behind Elf) and McKay's highest.

=== Critical response ===
On Rotten Tomatoes, Talladega Nights: The Ballad of Ricky Bobby has an approval rating of 72% based on 186 reviews. The site's critical consensus reads: "Though it occasionally stalls, Talladega Nights' mix of satire, clever gags, and excellent ensemble performances put it squarely in the winner's circle." On Metacritic, the film has a weighted average score of 66 out of 100, based on 33 critics, indicating "generally favorable reviews". Audiences surveyed by CinemaScore gave the film a grade "B" on scale of A+ to F.

Robert Koehler of Variety wrote: "Simultaneously teasing and loving a subject doesn't make for easy comedy, but writer-star Will Ferrell and director/co-writer Adam McKay pull it off with good-ol'-boy good nature in Talladega Nights: The Ballad of Ricky Bobby." Koehler was surprised by the racing aspects of the film, and praised McKay's direction and Oliver Wood cinematography, saying "he gets the grit, heat and feel of NASCAR racetracks with a near-documentary sensibility." Owen Gleiberman of Entertainment Weekly found the film increasingly uneven as it progressed but praised the racing sequences: "The races are scorchingly shot, and they lend the movie a zest that was missing from Anchorman". Sheri Linden of The Hollywood Reporter wrote: "From its pitch-perfect title through just about every detail, this sendup of sports-triumph movies maintains the right parodic pitch, if not always the highest mph on the laugh speedometer." British magazine Total Film gave it a perfect five-star rating, with the following verdict: "Forget the recent blips; Ferrell is back in freewheeling form. More than just the year's funniest film, Talladega Nights is one of the best films of the year." Automotive journalist Leo Parente said, "the most accurate racing film ever, trust me," while emphasizing that he was not being sarcastic.

Filmmaker Christopher Nolan cited the film as a personal favorite of his, calling it "great".

=== Promotional ===
V8 Supercars team Britek Motorsport incorporated the Talladega Nights logo into the paint scheme of their Ford Falcon BAs for the 2006 Sandown 500 and the 2006 Bathurst 1000.

=== Accolades ===
Award	Date of Ceremony	Category	Recipients	Result	Ref.
Teen Choice Awards	August 20, 2006	Choice Summer Movie	Talladega Nights: The Ballad of Ricky Bobby	Won	
Stinkers Bad Movie Awards	2007	Worst Movie Title	Talladega Nights: The Ballad of Ricky Bobby	Won	
Stinkers Bad Movie Awards	2007	The Spencer Breslin Award (for Worst Performance by a Child in a Feature Role)	Grayson Russell	Nominated	
Stinkers Bad Movie Awards	2007	The Spencer Breslin Award (for Worst Performance by a Child in a Feature Role)	Houston Tumlin	Nominated	
Stinkers Bad Movie Awards	2007	Most Annoying Fake Accent (Male)	Sacha Baron Cohen	Won	
Stinkers Bad Movie Awards	2007	Most Annoying Fake Accent (Male)	Will Ferrell	Nominated	
Stinkers Bad Movie Awards	2007	Most Annoying Fake Accent (Male)	John C. Reilly	Nominated	
MTV Movie Awards	June 3, 2007	Best Kiss	Will Ferrell and Sacha Baron Cohen	Won	
Teen Choice Awards	August 26, 2007	Choice Comedy Movie Actor	Will Ferrell	Won	

=== Home media ===
The first one million 60GB and 20GB PlayStation 3 units included a free theatrical promotional Blu-ray copy of the film.

The Blu-ray, standard DVD and PSP UMD versions were released on December 12, 2006, by Sony Pictures Home Entertainment. When viewing, the opening menu gives viewers choices for Super Speedway (with footage of the film used as introductions for special features, scene selection, etc.) or Short Track (without video introductions). The film is presented on standard DVD in four different configurations, giving consumers the choice between either theatrical or unrated versions in either its theatrical 2.39:1 anamorphic widescreen aspect ratio or in 1.33:1 pan and scan fullscreen. As for the audio, each standard DVD carries Dolby Digital 5.1 tracks in English and French with optional English and French subtitles.

Extras for the standard DVD editions include a retrospective "25 Years Later" commentary track featuring most of the main cast, deleted and extended scenes along with bonus race footage, features, interviews with Bobby, Naughton, and Carley, a gag reel, a line-o-rama feature with alternate dialogue from the film, and DVD-ROM content. The unrated disc contains additional deleted scenes ("Cal Calls Ricky" and "What'd You Do Today?"), an interview with Girard and Gregory, and commercials and public service announcements by Bobby and Naughton. The "Unrated & Uncut" DVD omits two scenes that were in theaters: Bobby, as a child, steals his mother's station wagon and the happenings of Bobby's pit crew. The scenes are not present in the deleted scenes either.

The Blu-ray release is available on a dual-layer disc with the majority of features presented in high definition. These include: nine deleted and extended scenes, three interviews, a gag reel, line-o-rama, bonus race footage, Bobby & Naughton's commercials, Bobby & Naughton's public service announcements, Walker & Texas Ranger, Will Ferrell Returns to Talladega and a theatrical trailer. Three non-high definition extras include: Daytona 500 Spot, NASCAR Chase for the Nextel Cup Spot, and Sirius and NASCAR Spot. In terms of technical aspects, this edition carries the unrated cut and presents the film with a widescreen transfer at its 2.39:1 theatrical aspect ratio and includes Dolby Digital 5.1 tracks in English and French and an uncompressed PCM 5.1 audio track in English, along with English, French, Spanish, Chinese, Portuguese, Korean and Thai subtitles.

In October 2016, the film was re-released on Blu-ray to coincide with its 10th anniversary. The 2-disc set includes all new bonus features, as well as both the theatrical and unrated versions of the film and the features found on the original releases of the film.

On August 4, 2026, the film was released on 4K Ultra HD Blu-ray for the first time, with a limited edition 20th anniversary steelbook.

== Legacy ==
=== Real-world homages ===
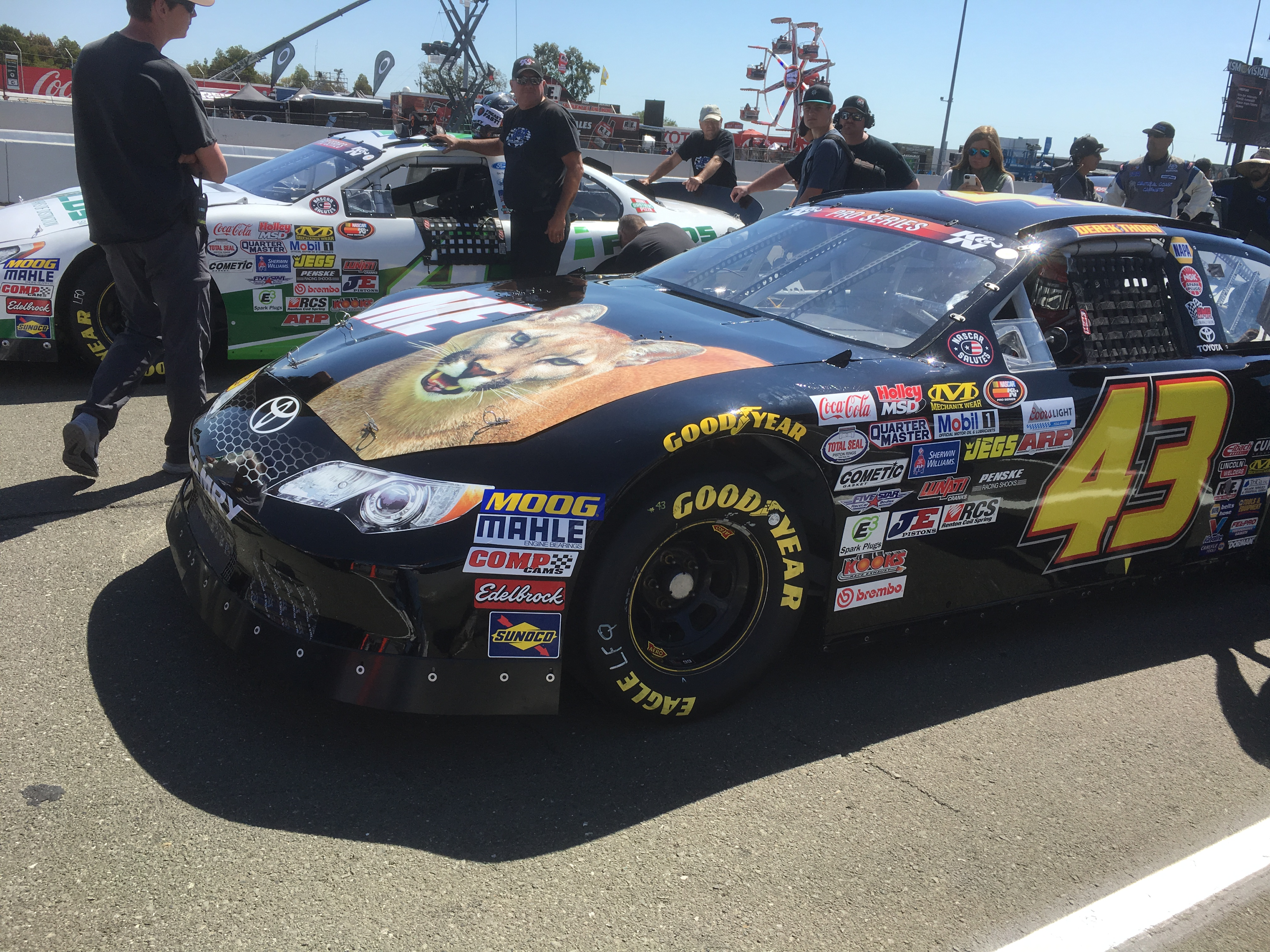
Derek Thorn's 2017 NASCAR K&N Pro Series West car with a hood decal referencing Ricky's "ME" car

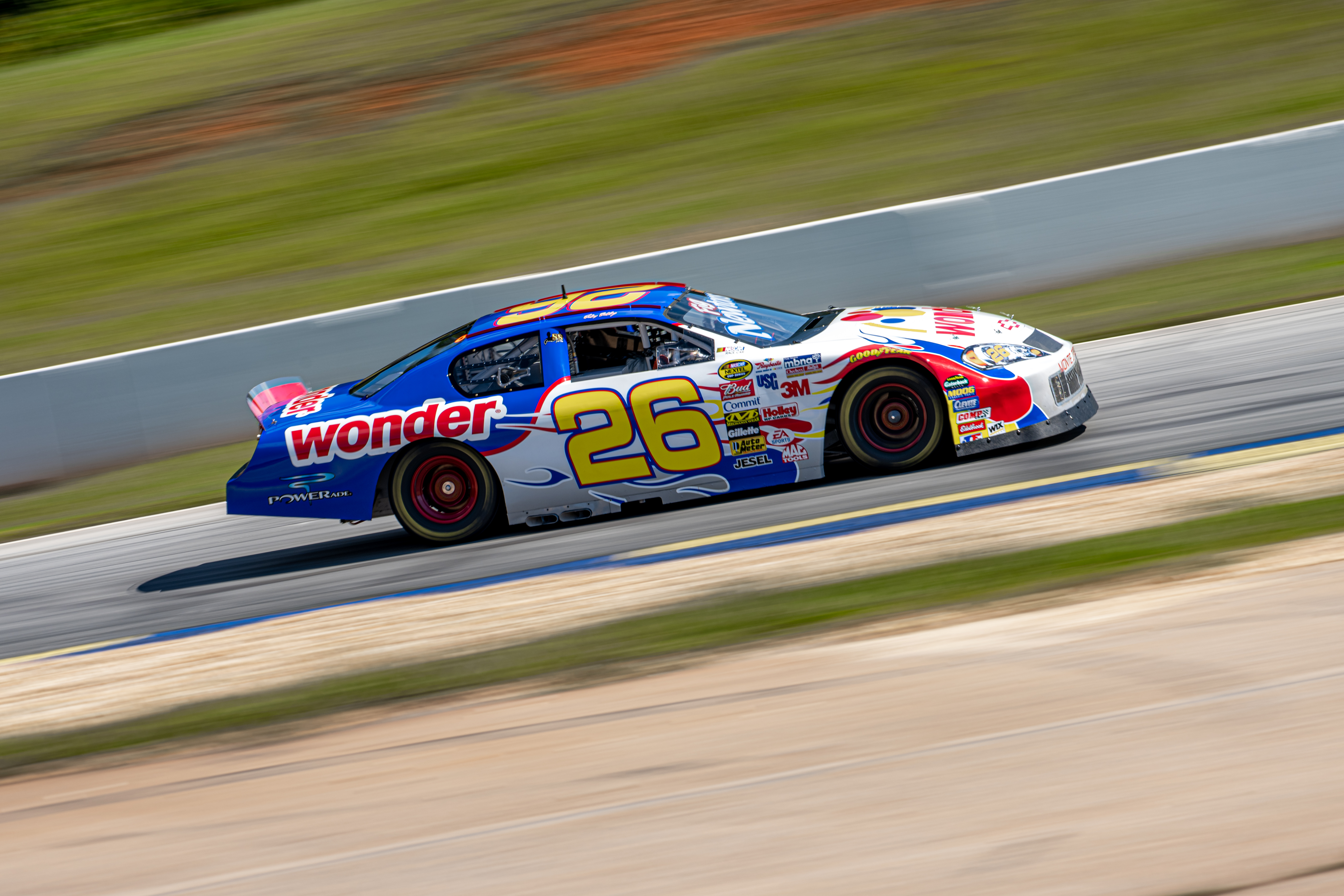
A Historic Sportscar Racing car based on Ricky's Wonder Bread car in 2021

On the final lap of the 2009 Aaron's 499 (one of two Sprint Cup Series races at Talladega Superspeedway), Carl Edwards crashed after Brad Keselowski made contact with his car on the final lap. His car turned backwards, went airborne, bounced off and crushed Ryan Newman's hood, flew into the catch fence, and came to a stop on the track apron. At this point, his car was just beyond the pit-road exit, as Keselowski and Dale Earnhardt Jr. crossed the finish line. Edwards climbed out of his car and jogged to the finish line. He received a standing ovation from the crowd. Fox play-by-play commentator Mike Joy commented on how it was "shades of Ricky Bobby". Although Edwards did cross the finish line but on his feet, he was still handed a DNF since his car did not cross the line and Edwards finished in 24th. Edwards was later asked about this on Larry King Live; he responded, "I'm kind of a Will Ferrell fan. He did that at the end of Talladega Nights."

At the 2012 Aaron's 499 at Talladega, Kurt Busch's unsponsored No. 51 Phoenix Racing Chevrolet Impala used Ricky Bobby's "ME" paint scheme. Busch and his team were heard reciting movie lines over the team radio. He was running up front when contact from behind sent him spinning; he went on to finish 20th. In October 2013, Busch's No. 78 Furniture Row Racing Chevrolet was sponsored by Wonder Bread for the 2013 Camping World RV Sales 500 at Talladega. Its paint scheme was based on Ricky's original No. 26. He finished 18th in the race.

During qualifying at the 2013 United States Grand Prix, Sebastian Vettel and his race engineer Guillaume "Rocky" Rocquelin made reference to the movie over team radio when Vettel posted the fastest lap and gained pole position. The pair referenced the movie in saying "shake and bake" over the team radio, the same phrase used by Bobby and Naughton.

During his victory lap and postrace interview following the 2021 Quaker State 400, driver Kurt Busch exclaimed "Shake and Bake!" in reference to his teammate Ross Chastain, who assisted Busch in holding off his brother Kyle Busch for the victory.

For the 2023 YellaWood 500 at Talladega, the Stewart–Haas Racing No. 14 Ford Mustang GT of Chase Briscoe sported Cal Naughton Jr.'s Old Spice paint scheme while the No. 41 Mustang of Ryan Preece used Ricky Bobby's Wonder Bread paint scheme. Preece ran a similar Wonder Bread scheme at Talladega the following year.
