= Pell City School District =

School district in Alabama

Pell City School District is a school district in St. Clair County, Alabama. The Pell City School District operates the Pell City High School, Duran Junior High School, Williams Intermediate School, and various elementary schools. The Pell City School District is governed by the Pell City Board of Education, with elected representatives forming the board selected and elected by the citizens of the Pell City School District.

As of 2025, Justin Burns is the superintendent of the Pell City School District.
