= Whitney, Alabama =

- Unincorporated community
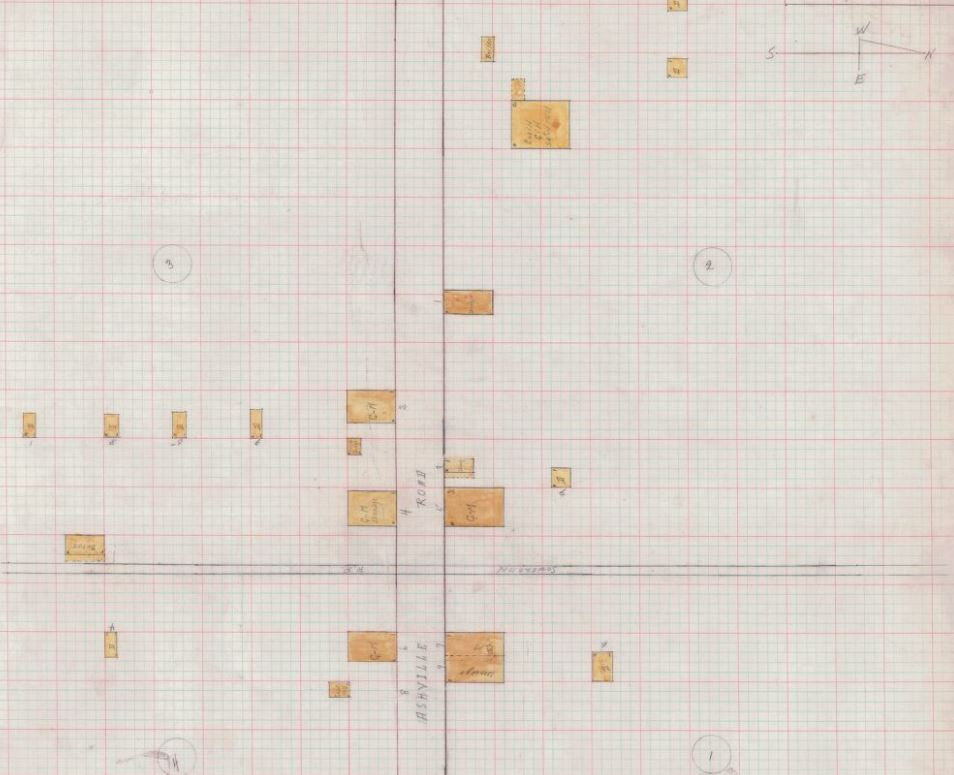
- 1926 fire insurance map of Whitney

- Location within Alabama Location within the United States
- Coordinates: 33°52′04″N 86°17′29″W
- Country: United States
- State: Alabama
- County: St. Clair
- Elevation: 597 ft (182 m)
- Time zone: UTC-6 (Central (CST))
  - Summer (DST): UTC-5 (CDT)
- Area codes: 205, 659
- GNIS feature ID: 164909

Whitney is an unincorporated community in St. Clair County, Alabama, United States.

== History ==
Whitney was named for Charles Whitney, a member of the Alabama Legislature following the Civil War. A post office was established under the name Whitney in 1875 and was in operation until 1967.
