= Horse Pens 40 =

Private nature park in Alabama

Coordinates: 33.923096°N 86.303184°W

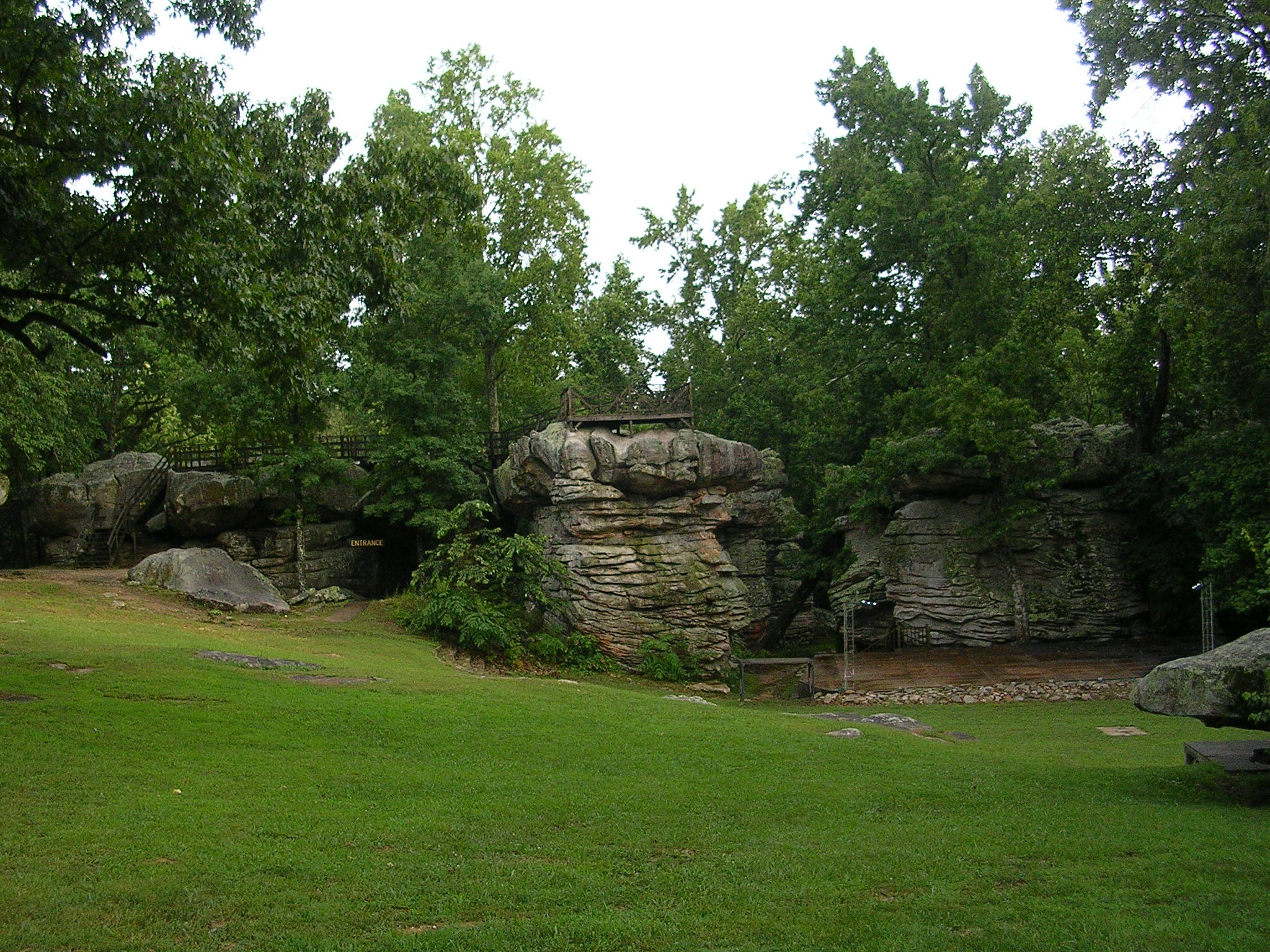
- Horse Pens 40
- Interactive map of Horse Pens 40
- Location: St. Clair County, Alabama
- Nearest city: Steele, Alabama

Horse Pens 40 is a privately owned outdoor nature park located in St. Clair County near Steele, Alabama. The park is situated atop Chandler Mountain, in the foothills of The Appalachian Mountains. The park is known among the rock climbing community as a premier bouldering site in the American Southeast. The site is also home to a "Bluegrass Park" where it hosts festivals showcasing the genre several times per year. The biggest of these festivals occurs on the Fourth of July. The park features both RV and primitive camping.

The park is recognized by the Alabama State Legislature in House/Senate Joint Resolution 177 as "The Home of the South's Bluegrass Music". The park got its name from the original deed; which when allocating the area of the plot stated "the home 40, the farming 40, and the horse pens 40"; each tract containing 40 acres (160,000 m^{2}) of land. Each year, the park hosts a leg of the "Triple Crown" bouldering competition.

== History ==
The natural rock shelters located in Horse Pens 40 have seen over 15,000 years of human habitation. The park contains ancient Native American burial grounds dating from the earliest inhabitants of this area, all the way up to the time of the Cherokee removal known as the "Trail of Tears". The Creek and Cherokee tribes at various times used the natural rock formations to trap and corral horses, as a natural fortress in times of war, and as a sheltered village area in times of peace. The site played host to the only peace treaty ever signed between the Creek and Cherokee tribes.

During The American Civil War, the site was used as a hiding place for horses and their owners wishing to avoid invaders from the north and the Confederate recruiters and "bushwhackers". Once it was discovered by Confederate forces, Horse Pens 40 was then used for the storage of supplies to be used by Confederate troops as they passed nearby.

In the late 1880s, the area was settled by The Hyatt Family of Georgia. The original deed from this era refers to "the home 40, the farming 40, and the horse pens 40", each tract consisting of 40 acres (160,000 m^{2}) of land. This is how Horse Pens 40 got its name. Descendants of the original Hyatt family still occupy nearby areas of the mountain.

Around 1958, a man from Huntsville, Alabama named Warren Musgrove discovered the acoustic quality of the natural amphitheater and developed the park as a venue for bluegrass and Gospel music concerts. It was one of the first outdoor bluegrass music festivals in the country, and by the 1970s had grown to be one of the largest in the world. The park served as a venue showcasing many legends of the bluegrass genre including Bill Monroe, Charlie Daniels, Ricky Skaggs, Lester Flatt, Ralph Stanley, Doc Watson, and Norman Blake. Emmylou Harris made her first public appearance at Horse Pens 40, "standing barefoot on a wooden door propped up on the rocks." During this period, the park was designated by the Alabama State Legislature as "The Home of the South's Bluegrass Music". The park was also used for several years during this time for Art and Craft shows.

The park, while recognized and protected by the State of Alabama, is private property owned by the Schultz Family, and as such is subject to their rules for access and stay.

== Wildlife and history ==
Chandler Mountain is home to many varieties of rare birds, animal, and plants, as well as ancient burial mounds and a sacred site for Native American. From the official website:

Since it is a natural stone fortress atop a fortress-like mountain, it was used by the Native Americans as a protected village and ceremonial area for thousands of years. There are living and working areas as well as burial areas dating back to the Paleo (pre- Stone Age-12,000+ years ago) and Archaic (early Stone Age-10,000 years ago) periods up to more recent times throughout the park. We also have what may be the only remaining example in the United States of an ancient leaching pit that has seen actual historical use.

The boulders range from 400 to 600 million years old with a section that scientists say may possibly date back over a billion years old. The area is home to field mice, foxes, badgers, black bear, coyotes, raccoons, deer, groundhogs, squirrels, as well as an assortment of hawks, owls, turkey vultures, and the rare red-cockaded woodpecker and red pileated woodpeckers.

== Bouldering ==
Horse Pens 40 is home to one of the most concentrated boulder fields in the world. The boulders are made of "ancient erosion carved sandstone". In most places they are solid enough to climb, however some boulders are made of weaker sandstone that crumbles to the touch. Certain bouldering routes take advantage of this "feature" (such as some of the routes in the Ten Pins section) to add to the difficulty rating of a problem.

Problems at HP40 normally range from V0- to V11. In addition, several problems beyond V11 are ranked. HP40 is famous for its slopers and difficult top-outs and mantles. Beta provided by the park rates the exposure on a problem on a "carnage" scale ranging from "Casual"-"Sketchy"-"Scary"-"Nuts". Some routes are particularly exposed and have dangerous top-outs, with "highball" risks and much risk of falling.

Horse Pens 40 sponsors several bouldering competitions per year, including the largest leg of the Triple Crown competition, the annual spring "Sloperfest Slap-N-Jam" competition and live music festival, the Chandler Mountain Challenge, and more. Although bouldering takes place year-round, the best time of year to climb at HP40 is early fall to late spring.

=== Notable routes ===
- Crisifix (V4)
- Brawn (V4)
- Wasp (V2)
- Slider (V9), Super Slider (V10) and Slider Sit (V10)
- Uniball (V4)
- Thumbalina (V5)
- Man With The Slow Hand (V4)
- Red Arrow (V3)
- Stretch Armstrong (V6)
- Spirit (V3)
- Genesis (V3) - the first route established at the park.
- Bumboy (V3)
- Millipede (V5)
- Mortal Combat (V3)
- Pope In A Cowboy Hat (V4)
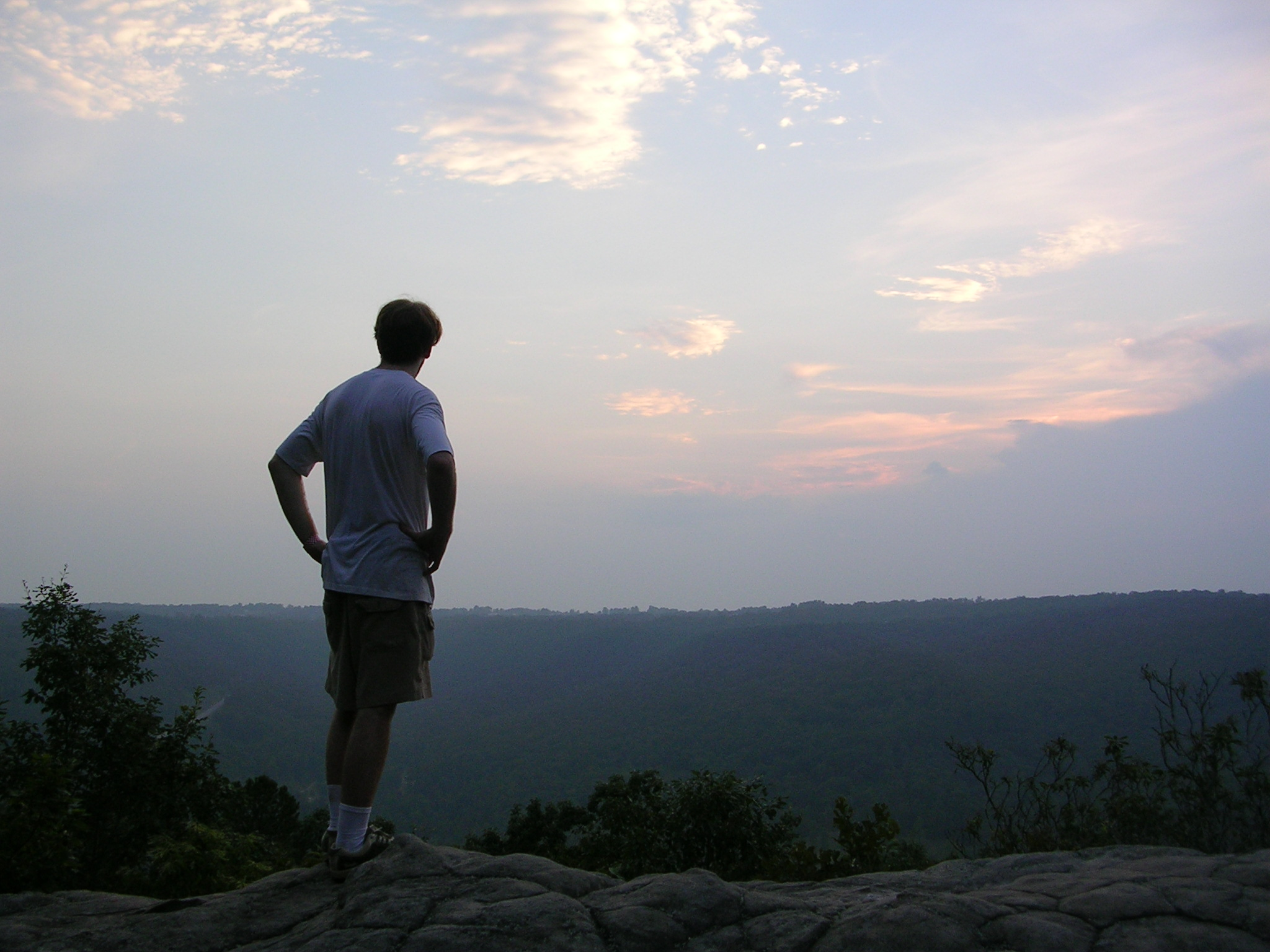
"Lookout Point" at sunset

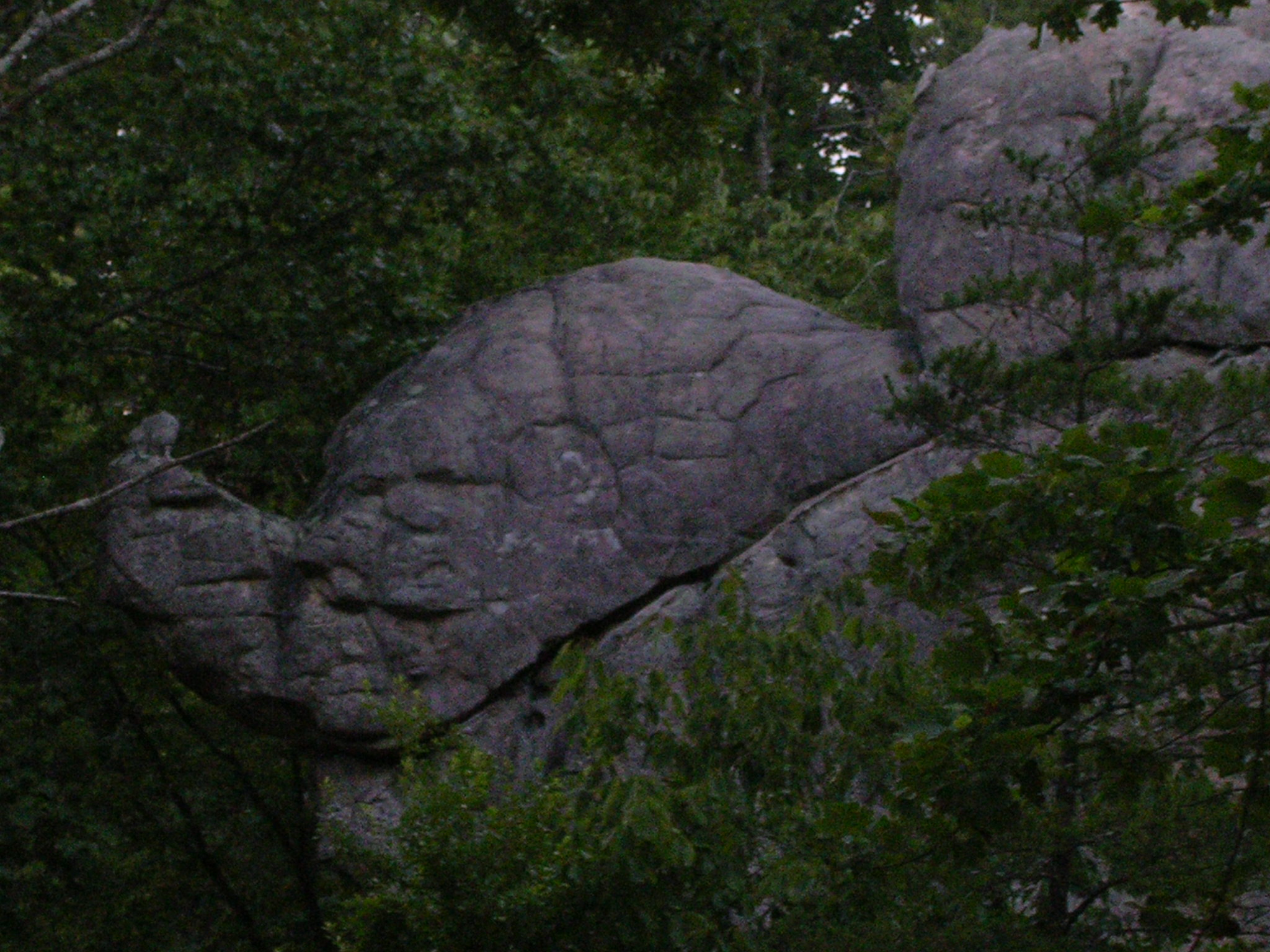
"Elephant Rock"

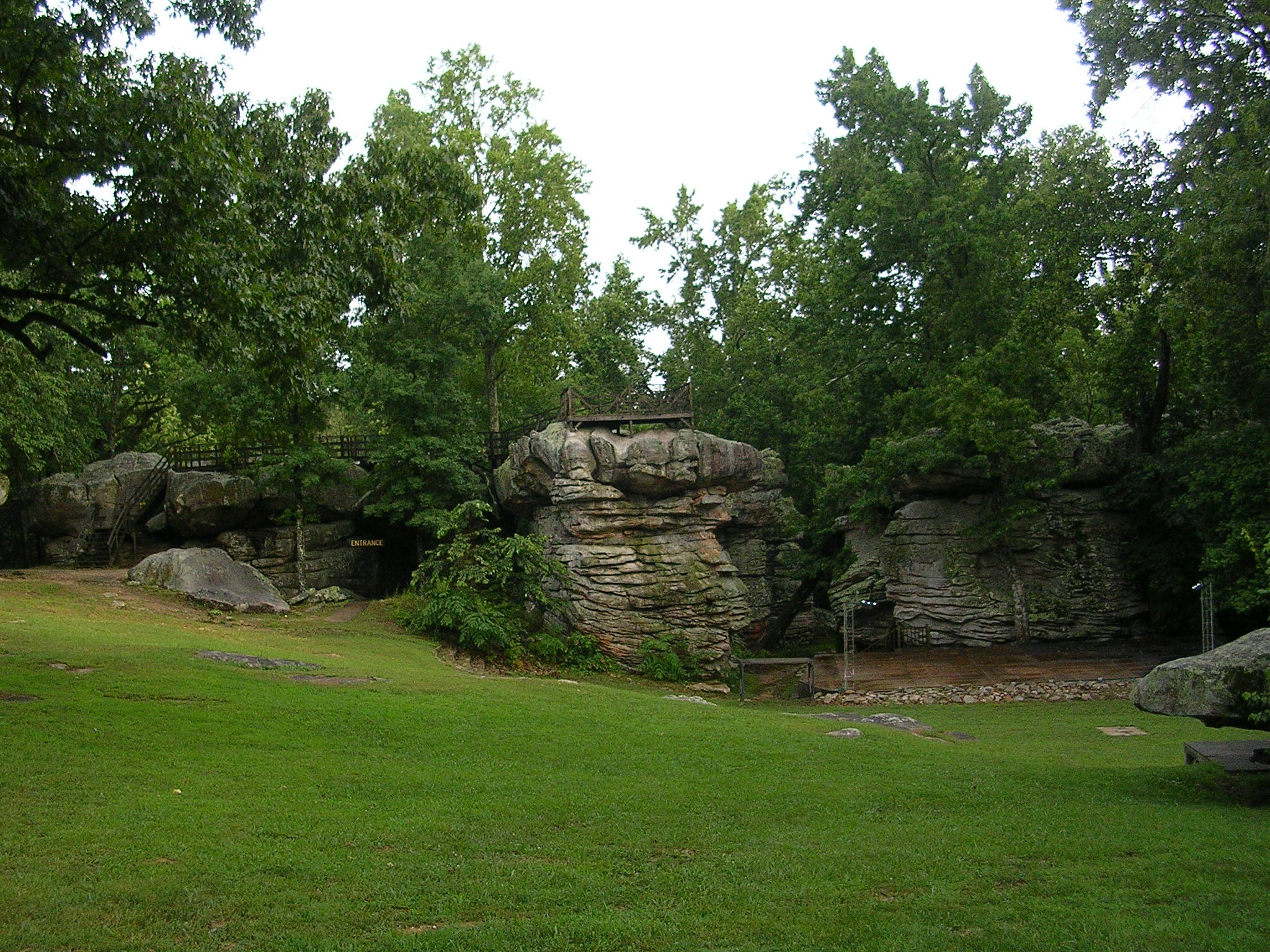
From left to right, "Mushroom Rock", "The Stone Fort", and "The Horse Pens"

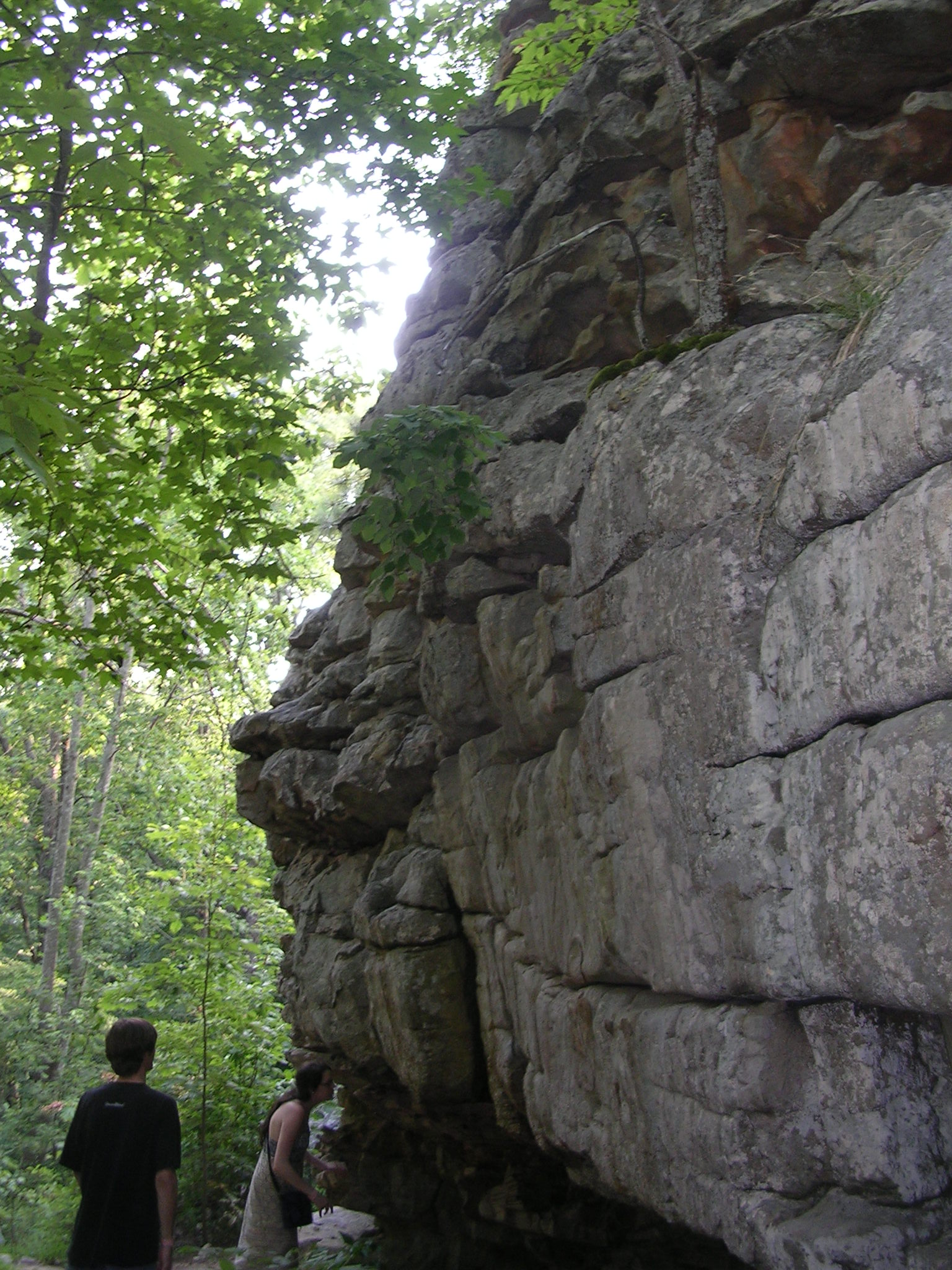
One of the many vertical rock faces at Horse Pens 40

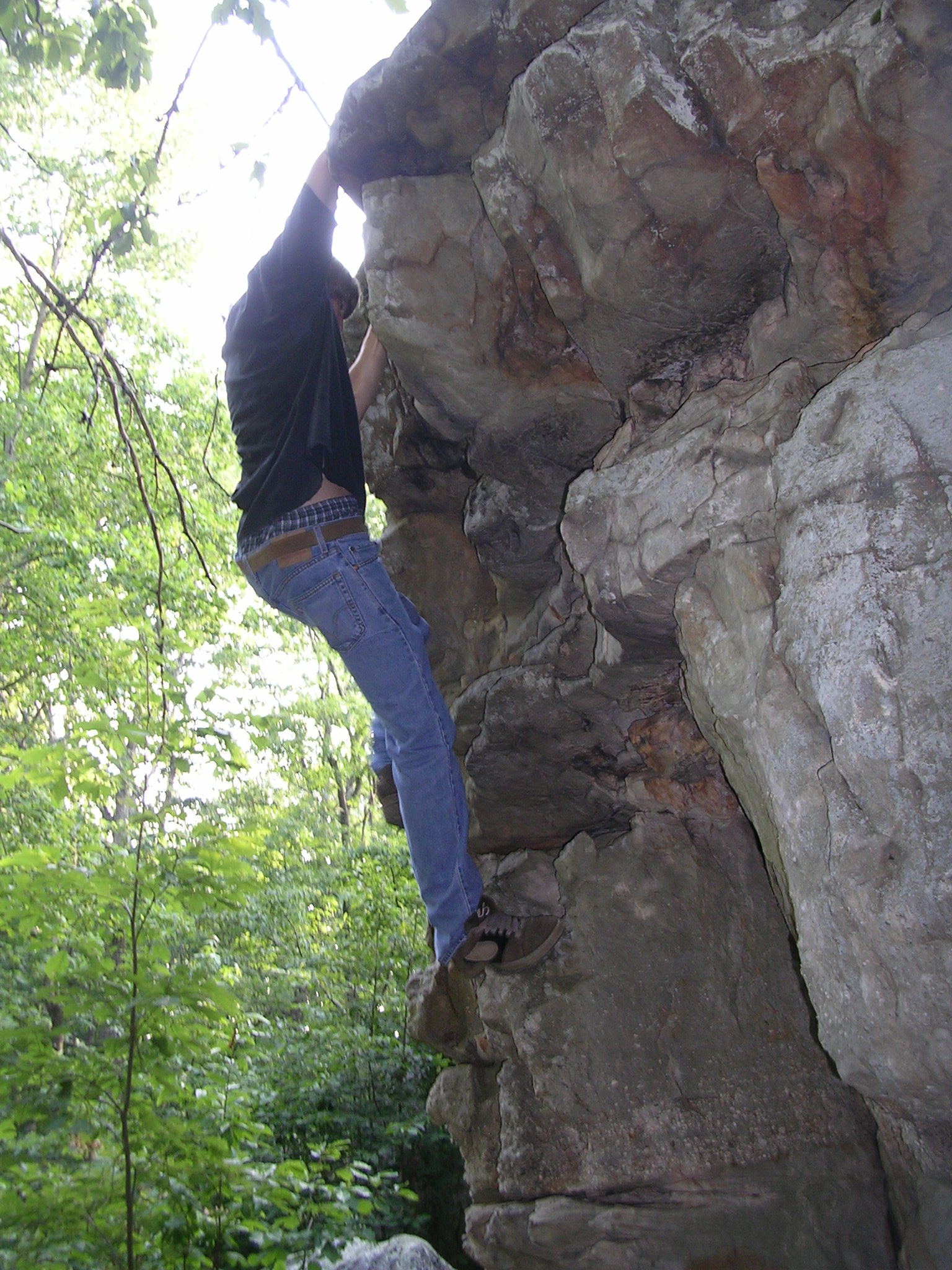
Bouldering at Horse Pens 40

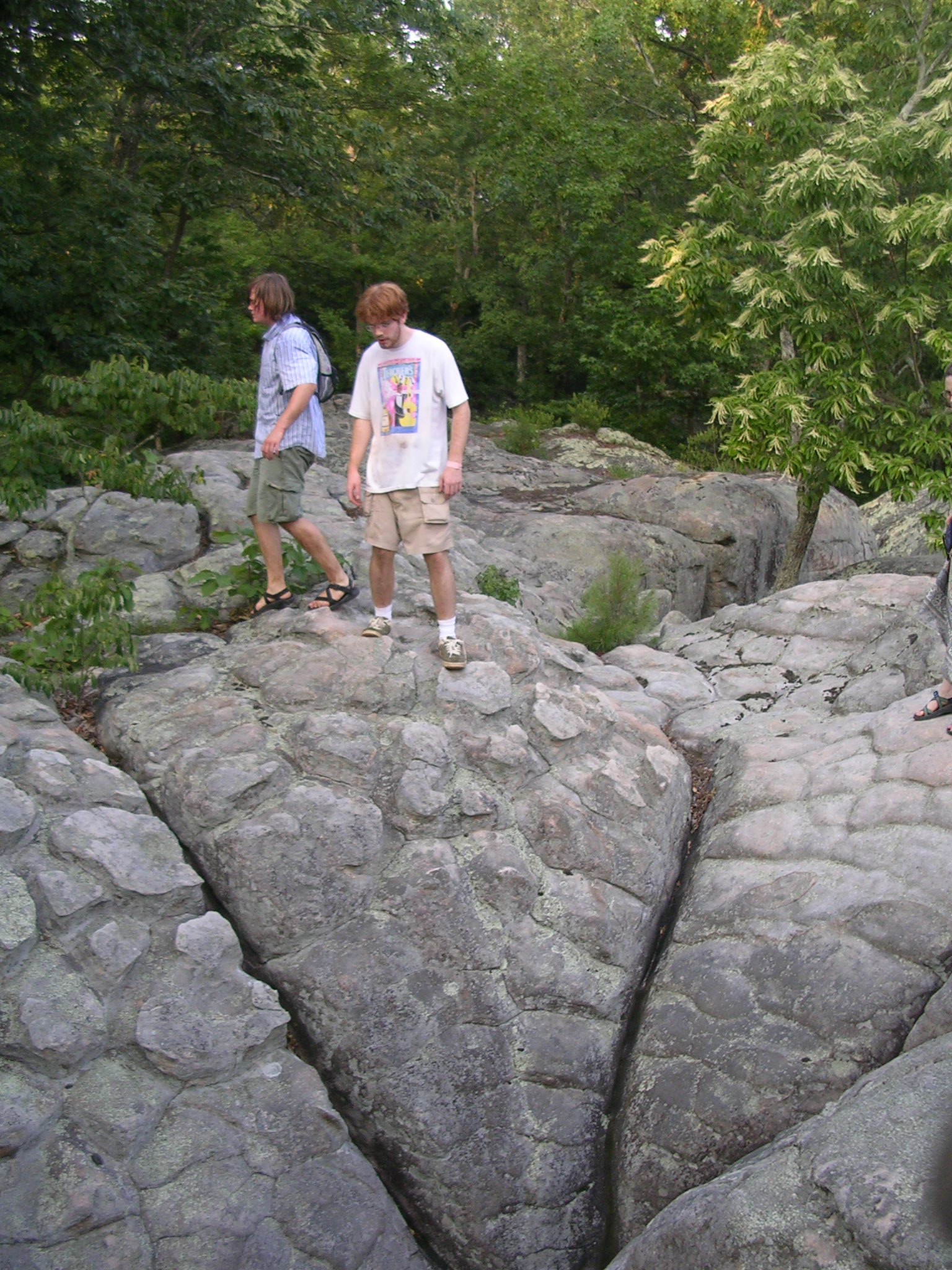
One of many unusual rock formations at Horse Pens 40

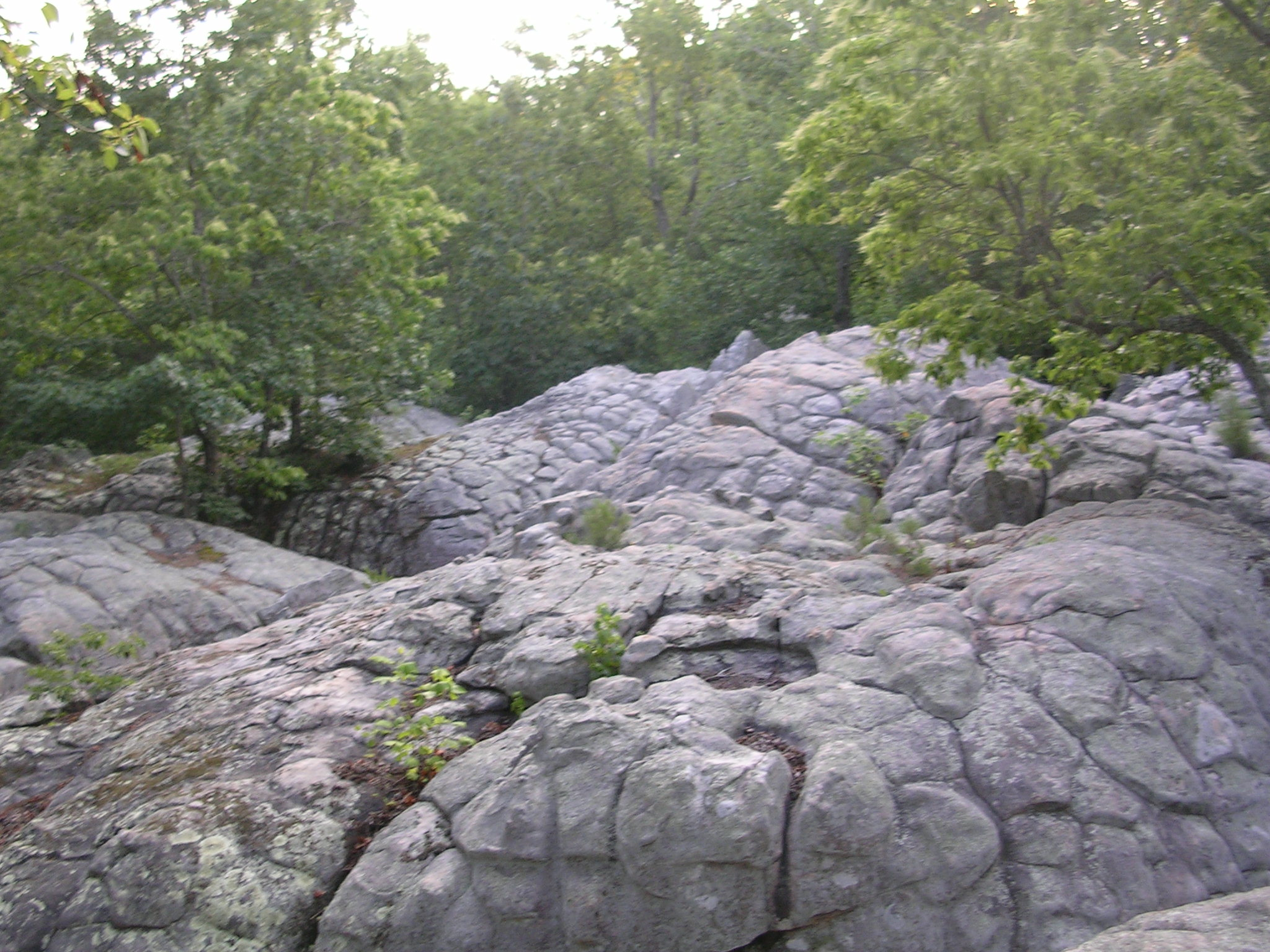

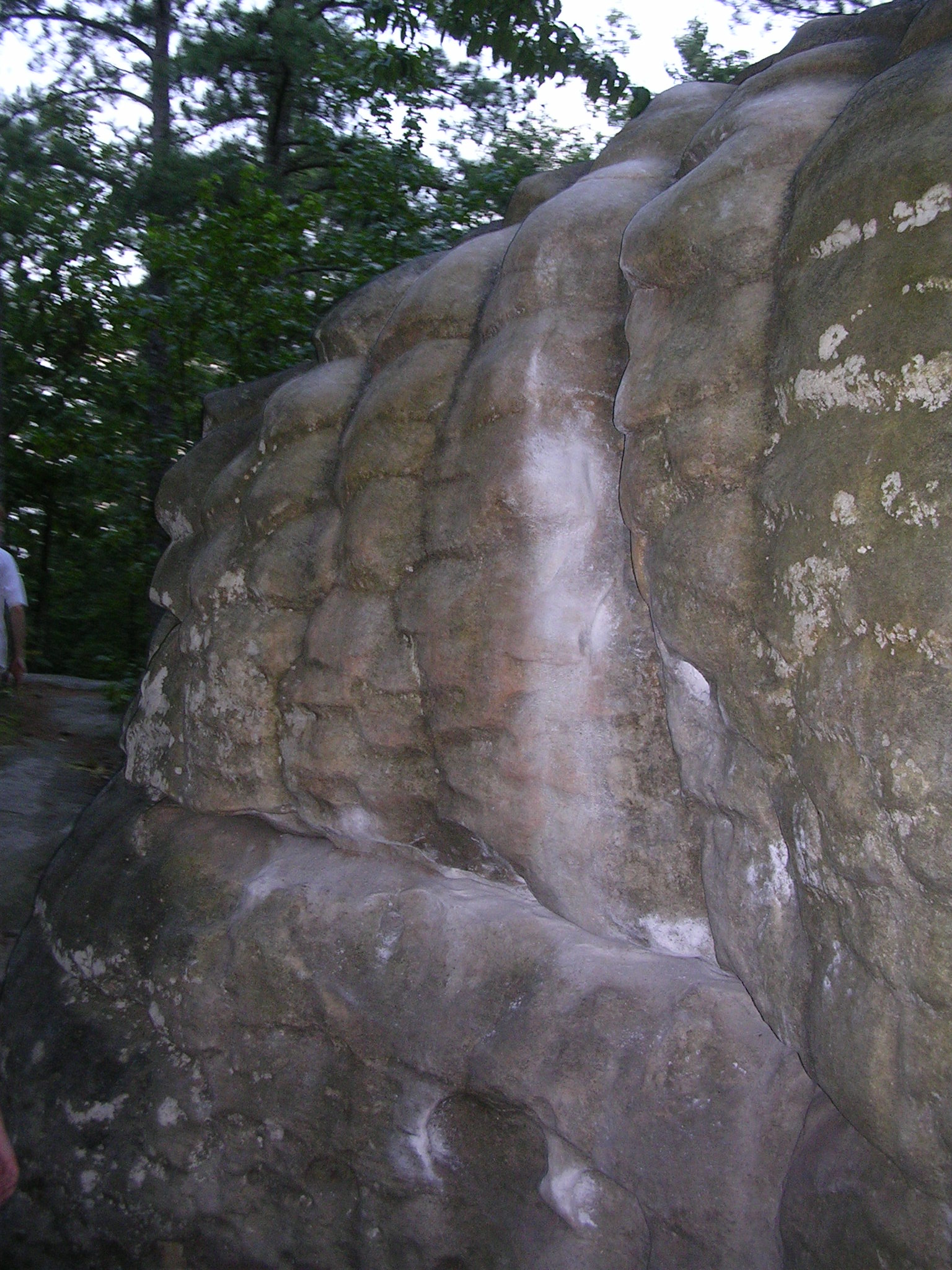
