= Pinedale Shores, Saint Clair County, Alabama =

Pinedale
- Unincorporated community
- Pinedale Shores, Alabama
- Location within Alabama Location within the United States
- Coordinates: 33°50′18″N 86°18′51″W
- Country: United States
- State: Alabama
- County: St. Clair
- Elevation: 577 ft (176 m)
- Time zone: UTC-6 (Central (CST))
  - Summer (DST): UTC-5 (CDT)
- Area codes: 205, 659
- GNIS feature ID: 164807

Pinedale Shores is an unincorporated community in Saint Clair County, Alabama, United States, located near Ashville.
