= Houston Tumlin =

American actor (1992–2021)

- Born: Houston Lee Tumlin; December 27, 1992; Pell City, Alabama, U.S.
- Died: March 23, 2021 (aged 28); Pelham, Alabama, U.S.
- Education: Victory Christian High School
- Occupation: Actor
- Years active: 2005–2006
- Military career
- Branch: United States Army
- Service years: 2014–2019
- Rank: Sergeant
- Unit: 101st Airborne Division
- Awards: Achievement Medal; National Defense Service Medal; Global War on Terrorism Service Medal; Air Assault Badge

Houston Lee Tumlin (December 27, 1992 – March 23, 2021) was an American child actor best known for his only acting role as Walker Bobby in the sports comedy film Talladega Nights: The Ballad of Ricky Bobby (2006).

== Early life and education ==
Tumlin was born Houston Lee Tumlin on December 27, 1992 in Pell City, Alabama, the son of Craig and Michelle (née Carter) Tumlin. He had an older brother named Tyler (b. 1988) and a younger sister named Hayden (b. 1998). Tumlin attended Victory Christian High School in Pell City and graduated in 2011.

== Career ==
=== Acting career ===
Tumlin portrayed Walker Bobby, one of the two sons of Will Ferrell's character Ricky Bobby, in the film Talladega Nights: The Ballad of Ricky Bobby in 2006.

=== Military career ===
He served in the U.S. Army for nearly six years and earned achievement and decorations as an E-5 Sergeant in the 101st Airborne Division, including the Achievement Medal, the National Defense Service Medal, the Global War on Terrorism Service Medal, and an Air Assault Badge.

== Filmography ==
=== Film ===
Year	Title	Role	Notes
2006	Talladega Nights: The Ballad of Ricky Bobby	Walker Bobby	

== Personal life ==
According to his mother, he had post-traumatic stress disorder (PTSD) and depression after his service in the military.

== Death ==
Tumlin died by suicide by a self-inflicted gunshot on March 23, 2021, at his home in Pelham, Alabama. He was 28 years old.

== Legacy ==
In March 2022, Tumlin's mother Michelle opened the non-profit organization entitled The Houston Project in their home town of Pell City which provides mental health and financial care for veterans and their families.
