= KWFM =

- South Tucson, Arizona; United States
- Broadcast area: Tucson, Arizona
- Frequency: 1330 kHz
- Branding: Star 1330

Programming
- Format: Classic hits
- Affiliations: The Daily Dees

Ownership
- Owner: AM Radio Licenses, LLC

History
- First air date: 1957
- Last air date: 2021
- Former call signs: KMOP (1957–1965); KHYT (1965–1987); KMRR (1987–1999); KJLL (1999–2012)

Technical information
- Facility ID: 57503
- Class: B
- Power: 2,000 watts daytime; 5,000 watts nighttime
- Transmitter coordinates: 32°18′51.3″N 110°50′19.3″W

KWFM was a classic hits formatted broadcast radio station licensed to South Tucson, Arizona, serving Tucson, Arizona. KWFM was last owned by AM Radio Licenses, LLC.

== History ==
The station went on the air as KMOP in 1957. It became KHYT in 1965, KMRR on February 7, 1987, KJLL in 1999, and KWFM in 2012.

As a talk radio station, KWFM aired national newscasts from CBS Radio News and CNN Radio. Hosts included Stephanie Miller, Ed Schultz, Michael Smerconish, Dr. Joy Browne, Leslie Marshall, Thom Hartman, and Don Imus.

In the midst of immense local turmoil and declining revenue as a talk station, KWFM flipped to a music format on September 20, 2012. As a music station, KWFM featured Rick Dees (Daily Dees, Rick Dees Weekly Top 40) and M.G. Kelly (Back To The 70s, Amazing 80s, Your 90s Rewind).

The Federal Communications Commission cancelled KWFM's license to broadcast on October 4, 2021, when the owner, AM Radio Licenses, LLC, did not file for renewal.
