= Pell City, Alabama =

City in Alabama, United States

- City
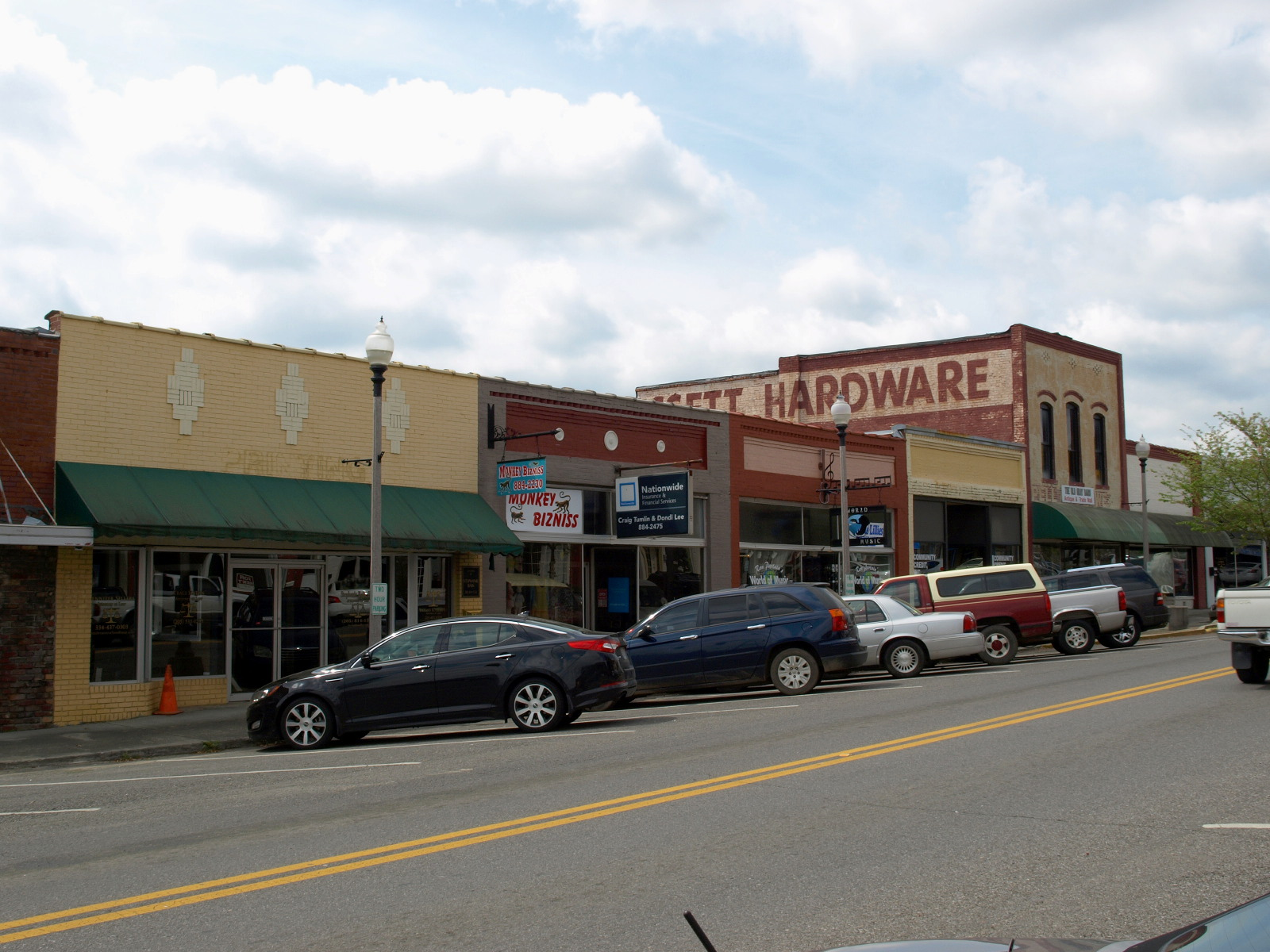
- Buildings in historic district

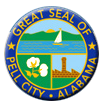
- Seal

- Location of Pell City in St. Clair County, Alabama.
- Coordinates: 33°33′40″N 86°15′10″W
- Country: United States
- State: Alabama
- County: St. Clair
- Established: 1890

Government
  - Type: Council-manager government

Area
  - Total: 27.76 sq mi (71.90 km^{2})
  - Land: 25.00 sq mi (64.75 km^{2})
  - Water: 2.76 sq mi (7.14 km^{2})
- Elevation: 486 ft (148 m)

Population (2020)
  - Total: 12,939
  - Density: 517.5/sq mi (199.82/km^{2})
- Time zone: UTC-6 (Central (CST))
  - Summer (DST): UTC-5 (CDT)
- ZIP codes: 35125, 35128, 35054
- Area codes: 205, 659
- FIPS code: 01-58896
- GNIS feature ID: 2404499
- Website: www.pellcity.gov

Pell City is a city in and one of the county seats of St. Clair County, Alabama, United States, the other seat being Ashville. At the 2020 census, the population was 12,939. At the 2010 census, the city-limit population jumped to 12,695.

It was home to Avondale Mills and its legacy in the Avondale Mill Historic District.

== History ==
Railroad investors founded Pell City in 1890 and named it after George Pell of the Pell City Iron and Land Company, one of its financial backers. The city was incorporated on May 6, 1891, but nearly failed during the Panic of 1893.

Pell City was revived in 1902 when Sumter Cogswell built the Pell City Manufacturing Company, which subsequently became Avondale Mills, a major landmark of the town until Thunder Enterprises, a Tennessee company, bought the building and began dismantling the factory in 2008. On February 14, 2008, a fire started at the mill. The fire was so large it could be seen from the Chula Vista/ Springville exit on Interstate 20 (I20). The water tower remains, but the smoke stack was destroyed by workers after cracking in the cement made it a hazard.

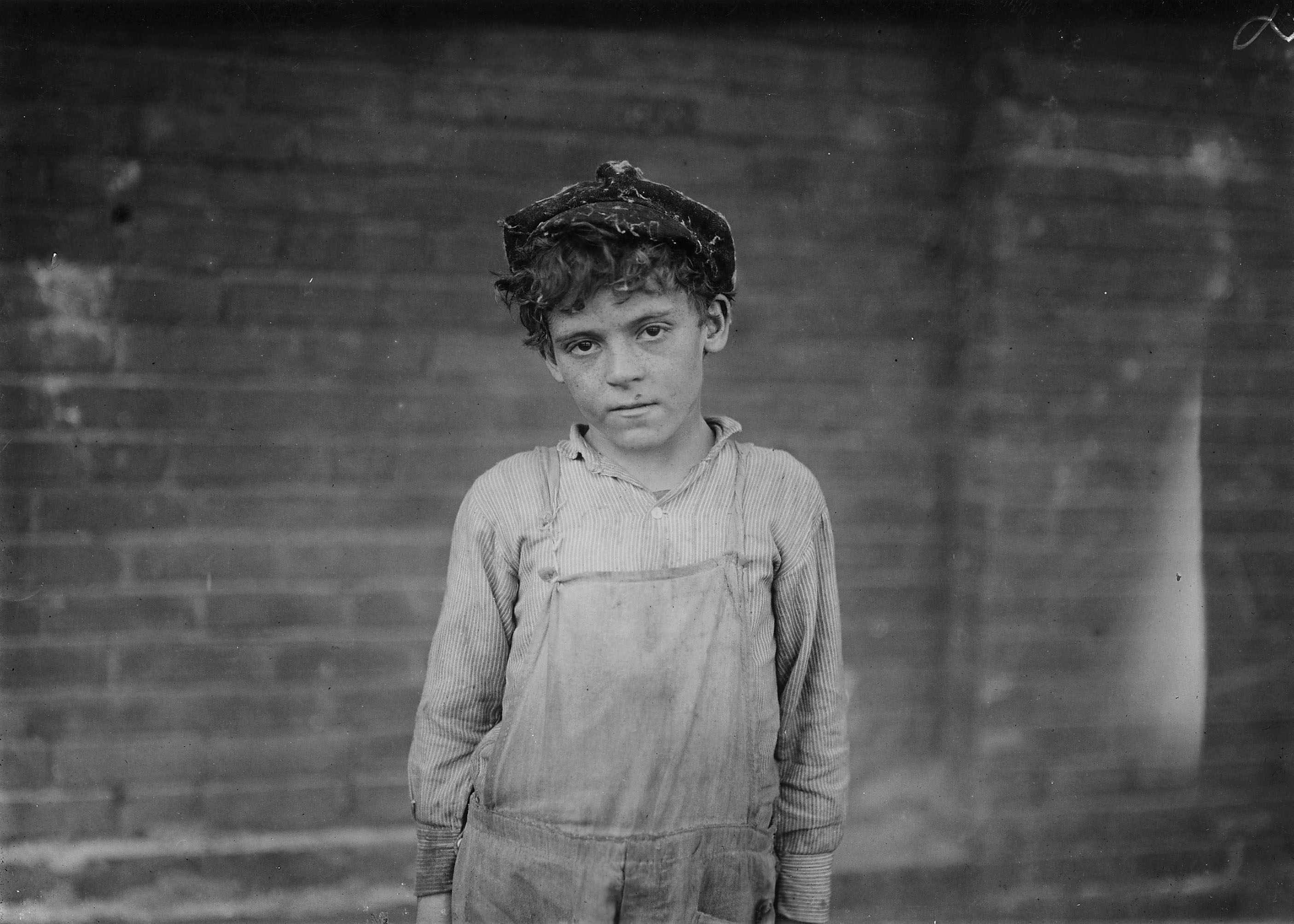
One of the young doffers working in Pell City Cotton Mill, 1910. Photo by Lewis Hine.

The mill was the economic and social center of the town during its development and early growth. Besides the textile mill, other economic endeavors included agriculture and mercantile establishments. Large cotton, soybean, and cattle farms were located in the area. Pell City increased its size in 1956 when the nearby towns of Eden and Oak Ridge were merged with the city. The first mayor was Green Evans.

The residences of Sumter Cogswell and Green Evans (Pell City's first mayor) are two of the earliest structures, dating from the late nineteenth century. The majority of the historic structures date from 1902 to 1905.

Ashville, Alabama, in the northern part of St. Clair County was the county seat from 1821 to 1907. A constitutional amendment in 1907 established Pell City as the second county seat, and for many years St. Clair County was the only county in the country with two full-service county seats. Both county seats remain operational to this day although Pell City has far surpassed Ashville in growth in large part due to I-20 and Logan Martin Lake. The construction of Logan Martin Dam in 1964 created the lake and a large recreational area, which brought new businesses, temporary summer residents and tourists, and hundreds of new permanent residents building new homes along the new lake.

On April 8, 1998, an F2 tornado struck north of the city limits after the F5 tornado expired in western Jefferson County. This windstorm killed two people in a mobile home. It remained for 14 mi (23 km), partially damaging a church, twenty-six homes and mobile homes, and other buildings in Coal City. Ninety other homes and mobile homes suffered minor to major destruction. An additional twelve people were injured. The twister damaged a funeral home and twenty-five homes. The Bethel Baptist Church in Odenville was destroyed a few minutes after its members left an Easter pageant rehearsal that had been cancelled because of the storm.

In 2006 Avondale Mills ceased operations. Two years later, in February 2008, Avondale Mills burned down in an accidental fire. At the time, Thunder Enterprises, a Tennessee firm, had completed almost half of the work in dismantling the building for materials. No employees were harmed in the fire.

In November 2015, Pell City made global news when a video of the Avondale Mills smokestack went viral on the internet. During a demolition of the smokestack, the 133-year-old structure collapsed on top of construction worker, Tim Philfer. Luckily, Philfer walked away unharmed from this accident.

== Geography ==
According to the U.S. Census Bureau, the city has a total area of 27.2 square miles [sq mi] (70 km^{2}), of which 24.6 sq mi (64 km^{2}) is land and 2.6 sq mi (6.7 km^{2}) or 9.57% is water. It is the largest city in St. Clair County. The city is located on the shores of Logan Martin Lake, created by the construction of Logan Martin Dam in 1964 to provide hydro-electric power to the central region of the state. The city is surrounded by the unincorporated communities of Wattsville to the north, Cropwell to the south, Seddon to the east, and Chulavista to the west.

The city is located along Interstate 20, which runs west to east through the northern part of the city, leading east 114 mi (183 km) to Atlanta and west 35 mi (56 km) to Birmingham. Access to the city can be found from exits 156 and 158. U.S. Route 231 also runs through the city, leading north 19 mi (31 km) to Ashville and southwest 21 mi (34 km) to Harpersville. U.S. Route 78 also runs through the city, paralleling I-20.

== Demographics ==
Historical population
| Census | Pop. | Note | %± |
|---|---|---|---|
| 1900 | 98 | | — |
| 1910 | 530 | | 440.8% |
| 1920 | 825 | | 55.7% |
| 1930 | 835 | | 1.2% |
| 1940 | 900 | | 7.8% |
| 1950 | 1,189 | | 32.1% |
| 1960 | 4,165 | | 250.3% |
| 1970 | 5,602 | | 34.5% |
| 1980 | 6,616 | | 18.1% |
| 1990 | 8,118 | | 22.7% |
| 2000 | 9,565 | | 17.8% |
| 2010 | 12,695 | | 32.7% |
| 2020 | 12,939 | | 1.9% |
| 2025 (est.) | 14,320 | ▲ | 10.7% |
U.S. Decennial Census

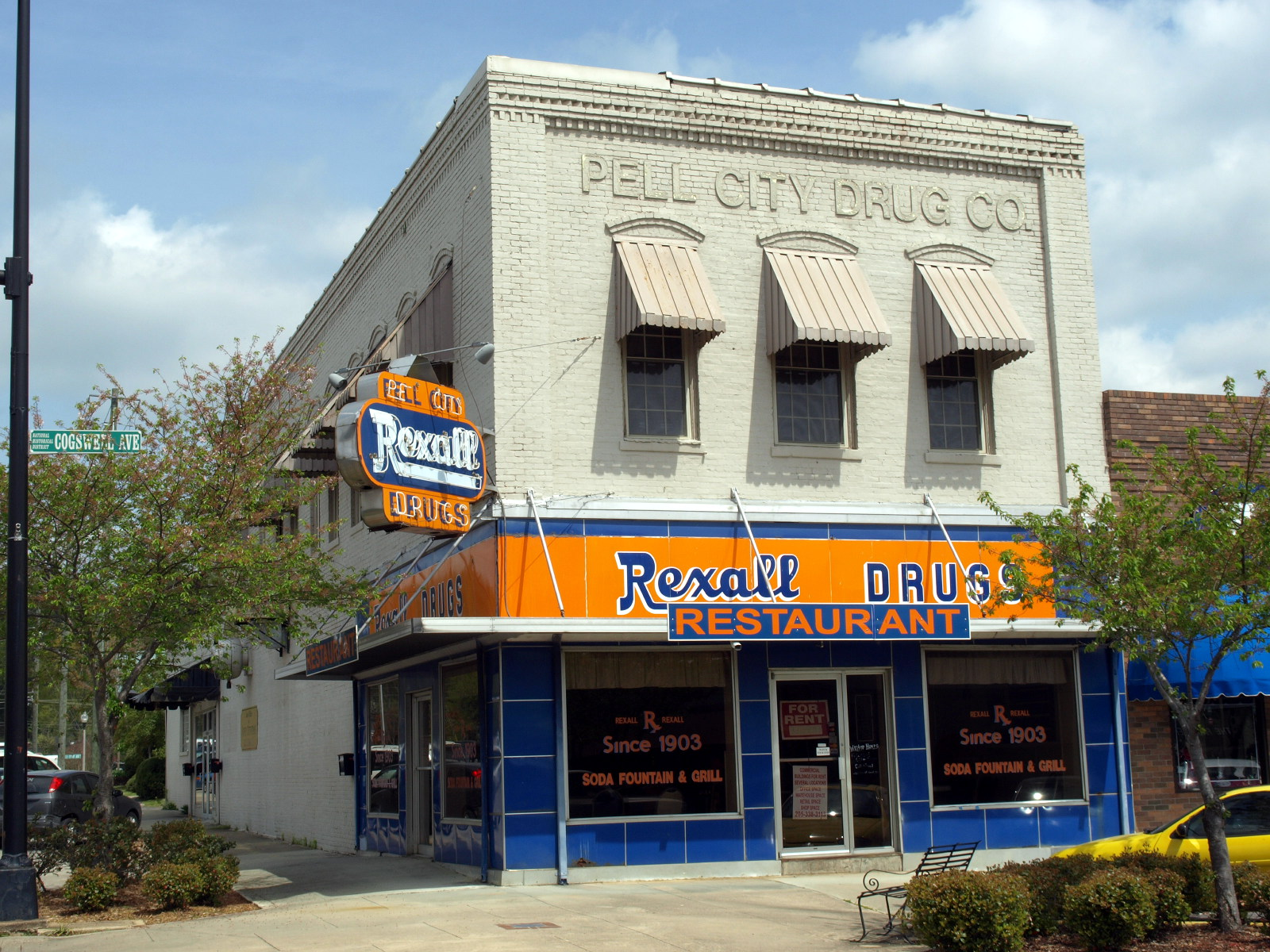
Pell City Drug Company, 2014

=== 2020 census ===
As of the 2020 census, Pell City had a population of 12,939. The median age was 42.7 years. 21.5% of residents were under the age of 18 and 20.5% of residents were 65 years of age or older. For every 100 females there were 94.0 males, and for every 100 females age 18 and over there were 90.7 males age 18 and over.

80.3% of residents lived in urban areas, while 19.7% lived in rural areas.

There were 5,148 households in Pell City and 3,698 families. Of all households, 31.4% had children under the age of 18 living in them, 48.7% were married-couple households, 16.0% were households with a male householder and no spouse or partner present, and 30.5% were households with a female householder and no spouse or partner present. About 26.9% of all households were made up of individuals and 12.5% had someone living alone who was 65 years of age or older.

There were 5,685 housing units, of which 9.4% were vacant. The homeowner vacancy rate was 1.6% and the rental vacancy rate was 7.4%.

Pell City racial composition
| Race | Num. | Perc. |
|---|---|---|
| White (non-Hispanic) | 9,954 | 76.93% |
| Black or African American (non-Hispanic) | 2,017 | 15.59% |
| Native American | 26 | 0.2% |
| Asian | 140 | 1.08% |
| Pacific Islander | 1 | 0.01% |
| Other/Mixed | 495 | 3.83% |
| Hispanic or Latino | 306 | 2.36% |

=== 2010 census ===
As of the census of 2010, there were 12,463 people, 5,149 households, and 3,545 families residing in the city. The population density was 458.2 inhabitants per square mile (176.9/km^{2}). There were 5,784 housing units at an average density of 212.6 per square mile (82.1/km^{2}). The racial makeup of the city was 80.8% White, 15.6% Black or African American, 0.3% Native American, 0.8% Asian, 0.1% Pacific Islander, 1.1% from other races, and 1.4% from two or more races. 2.3% of the population were Hispanic or Latino of any race.

There were 3,830 households, out of which 29.0% had children under the age of 18 living with them, 49.9% were married couples living together, 14.6% had a female householder with no husband present, and 31.2% were non-families. 27.3% of all households were made up of individuals, and 10.4% had someone living alone who was 65 years of age or older. The average household size was 2.42 and the average family size was 2.92.

In the city, the population was spread out, with 23.7% under the age of 18, 7.9% from 18 to 24, 26.0% from 25 to 44, 26.7% from 45 to 64, and 15.7% who were 65 years of age or older. The median age was 39 years. For every 100 females, there were 89.1 males. For every 100 females age 18 and over, there were 90.5 males.

The median household income in the city was $43,260. About 10.5% of families and 10.7% of the population were below the poverty line, including 14.6% of those under age 18 and 9.4% of those age 65 or over.

=== 2000 census ===
As of the census of 2000, there were 9,565 people, 3,830 households, and 2,772 families residing in the city. The population density was 389.3 inhabitants per square mile (150.3/km^{2}). There were 4,275 housing units at an average density of 174.0 per square mile (67.2/km^{2}). The population of the city is hard to pinpoint due to a large number of second residences, lake homes, and summer population influx. The racial makeup of the city was 83.41% White, 15.38% Black or African American, 0.16% Native American, 0.22% Asian, 0.02% Pacific Islander, 0.26% from other races, and 0.55% from two or more races. 1.25% of the population were Hispanic or Latino of any race.

There were 3,830 households, out of which 30.3% had children under the age of 18 living with them, 56.9% were married couples living together, 12.1% had a female householder with no husband present, and 27.6% were non-families. 24.5% of all households were made up of individuals, and 10.9% had someone living alone who was 65 years of age or older. The average household size was 2.47 and the average family size was 2.92. 76.3% of residents were high school graduates or higher, and 17.1% held a bachelor's degree or higher.

In the city, the population was spread out, with 23.9% under the age of 18, 7.5% from 18 to 24, 27.6% from 25 to 44, 25.0% from 45 to 64, and 16.0% who were 65 years of age or older. The median age was 39 years. For every 100 females, there were 90.6 males. For every 100 females age 18 and over, there were 87.8 males.

The median household income in the city was $48,300. About 7.5% of families and 11.2% of the population were below the poverty line, including 15.2% of those under age 18 and 9.8% of those age 65 or over. However, these figures provide an incomplete picture of the area. Many of the affluent neighborhoods along the lake shore that are often considered part of Pell City are actually just outside the city limits in unincorporated areas. These neighborhoods constitute a sizable population and income level, but are not reflected in official city census data.

== Economy ==
In 2015, Pell City residents were given the opportunity to vote on the legalization of Sunday alcohol sales. A study commissioned by the City of Pell City projected a $6.8 million economic impact if the referendum passed. On August 11, citizens voted 74% in favor of the referendum. On August 23, businesses were allowed to begin selling alcohol on Sundays for the first time. Likely due to the passage of this referendum, several corporate entities immediately entered into negotiations to open new restaurants and sports bars within the city. Buffalo Wild Wings announced its intention to build a brand new restaurant in late 2015. Construction and training were completed in October 2016, and the restaurant opened on November 7, 2016.

The city announced in June 2016 that it had entered into an agreement with Premiere Cinemas to develop a new 40,000 sq ft entertainment center which would include seven movie screens, a 10-lane bowling alley, a cafe, arcade and event rooms. The complex opened to the public on January 17, 2019.

== Government ==
In 2012, having surpassed a population of 12,000 residents, Pell City became only the 14th municipality in Alabama to change its form of government to a Council-Manager form of government. Under this form of government, the city council appoints a City Manager who then oversees the day-to-day operations of the city. While the mayor's position does not have a vote on matters that come before the council, the mayor may use their discretion to veto certain items. The city manager is Brian Muenger, and the mayor is Bill Pruitt.

== Education ==
After a period of growth in the 1980s, Pell City voted to split its school system off from the county system, becoming independent. The Pell City School District has over 4500 students spread across Pell City High School, Duran Junior High School, Duran South, Iola Roberts Elementary, Walter M. Kennedy Elementary, Coosa Valley Elementary, Eden Elementary, and Williams Intermediate School. The system also operates a trade school as an alternative to college preparation courses.

A conversion of Duran South into a dedicated pre-k school was discussed by the school board in 2019. Seventh and eighth grades would be combined into one school, with Pell City High School being remodeled. These proposals were accepted by the school board.

In 2005 Jefferson State Community College opened a new campus location in Pell City offering a wide variety of community college courses. The school announced in 2009 that it will begin offering nursing programs to support the recently confirmed Veterans Nursing Home and St. Vincent's St. Clair Hospital.

In 2011, two of the city's schools, Iola Roberts Elementary and Pell City High School, began the year after undergoing extensive renovations and/or expansions to their campuses.

In November 2021 the Pell City School System passed its a property tax referendum, which included full-time art and music teachers for all elementary schools, storm shelters at Eden Elementary School and Coosa Valley Elementary School, a complete renovation of Pell City High School along with a new cafeteria and band hall, a new multi-purpose building to Duran North, and various improvements and upgrades to sports facilities.

== Media ==
Pell City, and all of St. Clair County, is located in Birmingham's designated market area for local news and weather coverage. The city has one dedicated FM radio station, WFHK.

Pell City is served by two daily and two weekly newspapers. The Birmingham News serves the county, and The Daily Home, which also represents Talladega County, maintains an office in the city. The weekly St. Clair News-Aegis and St Clair Times offer more local coverage. The latter is an offshoot of The Daily Home.

== Infrastructure ==
St. Vincent's St. Clair hospital, operated by the St. Vincent's Health System, serves the entire county, but is located solely within the city limits. It replaced an aging facility, formerly known as St. Clair Regional Hospital.

== Notable people ==
- David Gulledge, former NFL player
- Houston Tumlin, former actor
- Lum Harris, former Major League Baseball pitcher, coach, and manager
- Todd Jones, former pitcher for the Detroit Tigers
- Jeanne Pruett, country music singer, best known for her song "Satin Sheets"
- Locke St. John, current relief pitcher for the Texas Rangers
- Will Wilcox, former PGA Tour Golfer, now caddie for PGA Tour Golfer Im Sung-jae
