= St. Clair County, Alabama =

County in Alabama, United States

- County
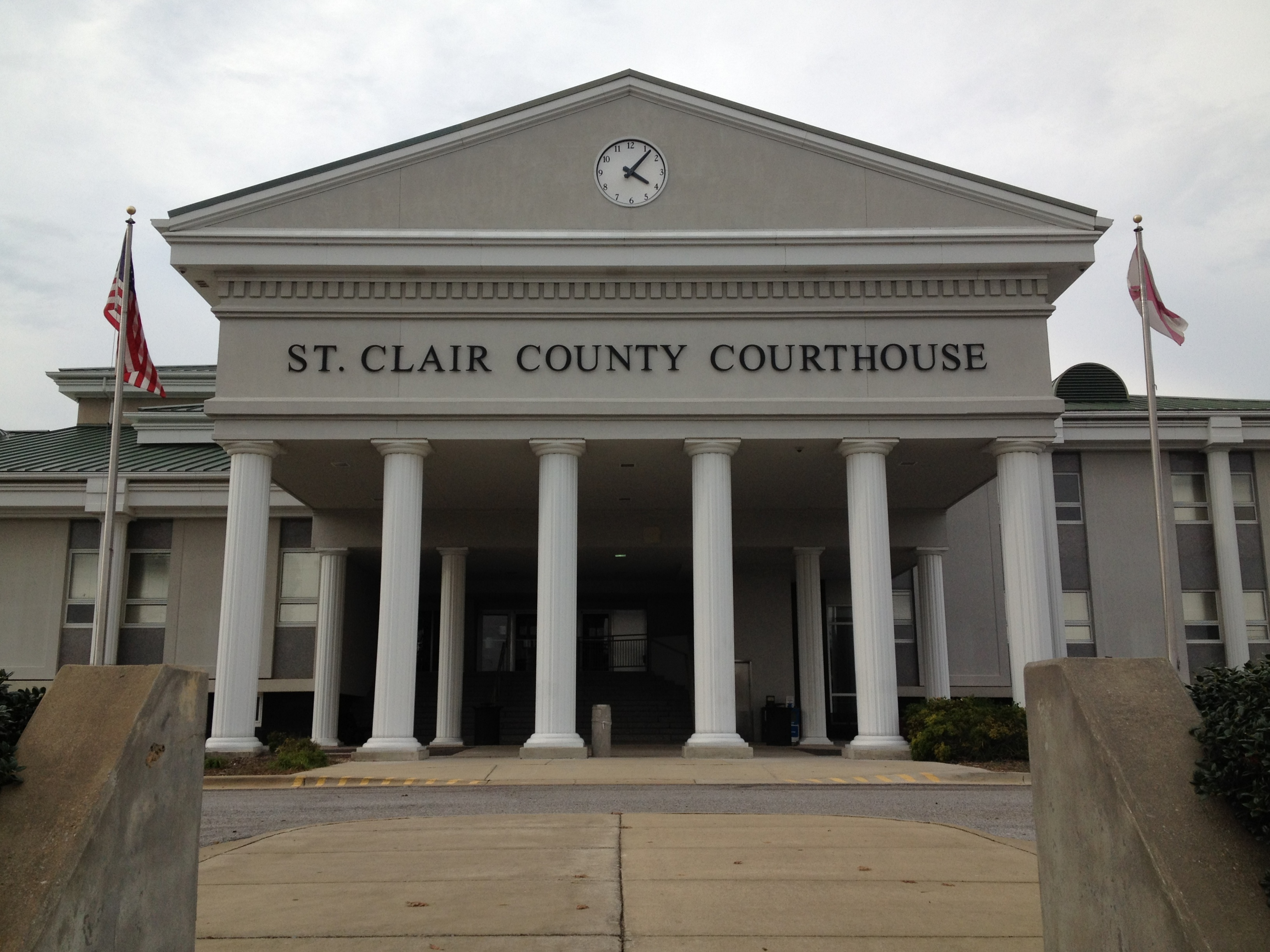
- St. Clair County Courthouse in Pell City

- Flag Seal

- Location within the U.S. state of Alabama
- Coordinates: 33°42′57″N 86°19′05″W
- Country: United States
- State: Alabama
- Founded: November 20, 1818
- Named for: Arthur St. Clair
- Seat: Ashville & Pell City
- Largest city: Pell City

Area
  - Total: 654 sq mi (1,690 km^{2})
  - Land: 632 sq mi (1,640 km^{2})
  - Water: 22 sq mi (57 km^{2}) 3.3%

Population (2020)
  - Total: 91,103
  - Estimate (2025): 98,206 ▲
  - Density: 144/sq mi (55.7/km^{2})
- Time zone: UTC−6 (Central)
  - Summer (DST): UTC−5 (CDT)
- Congressional district: 3rd
- Website: www.stclairco.com
- County Number 59 on Alabama Licence Plates

St. Clair County is a county located in the central portion of the U.S. state of Alabama. As of the 2020 census, the population was 91,103. It has two county seats: Ashville and Pell City. It is one of two counties in Alabama, and one of 33 in the United States, with more than one county seat. Its name is in honor of General Arthur St. Clair, an officer in the French and Indian War. St. Clair County is included in the Birmingham metropolitan area.

== History ==
St. Clair County was established on November 20, 1818, by the Alabama Territory legislature by splitting the area from Shelby County. The county seat was incorporated and named "Ashville" in honor of John Ash. In 1836, a portion of St. Clair County was separated to establish Cherokee County and DeKalb County. In 1866, after the Civil War, a northeast section of the county was used to create Etowah County.

Due to the relatively high terrain of the far southern end of the Appalachian Mountains which divides the county in a northeast–southwest orientation, and the difficulty of communication and administration from either side of the county to the other, a second county seat was established in Pell City to better provide administration and services to the southeast side of the county.

In 2019, St. Clair County became the seventh county in Alabama to adopt its own flag.

== Geography ==
According to the United States Census Bureau, the county has a total area of 654 square miles (1,690 km^{2}), of which 632 square miles (1,640 km^{2}) is land and 22 square miles (57 km^{2}) (3.3%) is water.

=== Adjacent counties ===
- Etowah County - northeast
- Calhoun County - east
- Talladega County - southeast
- Shelby County - southwest
- Jefferson County - west
- Blount County - northwest

== Demographics ==
Historical population
Census	Pop.	Note	%±
1820	4,166		—
1830	5,975		43.4%
1840	5,638		−5.6%
1850	6,829		21.1%
1860	11,013		61.3%
1870	9,360		−15.0%
1880	14,462		54.5%
1890	17,353		20.0%
1900	19,425		11.9%
1910	20,715		6.6%
1920	23,383		12.9%
1930	24,510		4.8%
1940	27,336		11.5%
1950	26,687		−2.4%
1960	25,388		−4.9%
1970	27,956		10.1%
1980	41,205		47.4%
1990	50,009		21.4%
2000	64,742		29.5%
2010	83,593		29.1%
2020	91,103		9.0%
2025 (est.)	98,206	▲	7.8%
U.S. Decennial Census; 1790–1960 1900–1990; 1990–2000 2010–2020

=== 2020 census ===
As of the 2020 census, the county had a population of 91,103. The median age was 40.7 years. 23.1% of residents were under the age of 18 and 17.4% of residents were 65 years of age or older. For every 100 females there were 98.2 males, and for every 100 females age 18 and over there were 95.4 males age 18 and over.

The racial makeup of the county was 83.1% White, 9.5% Black or African American, 0.4% American Indian and Alaska Native, 0.7% Asian, 0.0% Native Hawaiian and Pacific Islander, 1.2% from some other race, and 5.1% from two or more races. Hispanic or Latino residents of any race comprised 2.8% of the population.

32.9% of residents lived in urban areas, while 67.1% lived in rural areas.

There were 34,376 households in the county, of which 33.0% had children under the age of 18 living with them and 24.7% had a female householder with no spouse or partner present. About 23.3% of all households were made up of individuals and 10.4% had someone living alone who was 65 years of age or older.

There were 37,775 housing units, of which 9.0% were vacant. Among occupied housing units, 81.2% were owner-occupied and 18.8% were renter-occupied. The homeowner vacancy rate was 1.2% and the rental vacancy rate was 7.6%.

=== Racial and ethnic composition ===
St. Clair County, Alabama – Racial and ethnic composition Note: the US Census treats Hispanic/Latino as an ethnic category. This table excludes Latinos from the racial categories and assigns them to a separate category. Hispanics/Latinos may be of any race.
Race / Ethnicity (NH = Non-Hispanic)	Pop 1980	Pop 1990	Pop 2000	Pop 2010	Pop 2020	% 1980	% 1990	% 2000	% 2010	% 2020
White alone (NH)	36,755	45,038	57,917	72,947	74,962	89.20%	90.06%	89.46%	87.26%	82.28%
Black or African American alone (NH)	4,057	4,545	5,253	7,098	8,617	9.85%	9.09%	8.11%	8.49%	9.46%
Native American or Alaska Native alone (NH)	52	134	233	252	249	0.13%	0.27%	0.36%	0.30%	0.27%
Asian alone (NH)	43	76	108	512	655	0.10%	0.15%	0.17%	0.61%	0.72%
Native Hawaiian or Pacific Islander alone (NH)	x	x	17	41	20	x	x	0.03%	0.05%	0.02%
Other race alone (NH)	15	7	16	64	234	0.04%	0.01%	0.02%	0.08%	0.26%
Mixed race or Multiracial (NH)	x	x	512	963	3,791	x	x	0.79%	1.15%	4.16%
Hispanic or Latino (any race)	283	209	686	1,716	2,575	0.69%	0.42%	1.06%	2.05%	2.83%
Total	41,205	50,009	64,742	83,593	91,103	100.00%	100.00%	100.00%	100.00%	100.00%

=== 2010 census ===
As of the census of 2010, there were 83,593 people, 31,624 households, and 23,364 families living in the county. The population density was 132 people per square mile (51 people/km^{2}). There were 35,541 housing units at an average density of 56 units per square mile (22 units/km^{2}). The racial makeup of the county was 88.2% White, 8.6% Black or African American, 0.3% Native American, 0.6% Asian, 0.1% Pacific Islander, 0.9% from other races, and 1.3% from two or more races. 2.1% of the population were Hispanic or Latino of any race. Of the 31,624 households 30.7% had children under the age of 18 living with them, 58.3% were married couples living together, 11.2% had a female householder with no husband present, and 26.1% were non-families. 22.5% of households were one person and 8.5% were one person aged 65 or older. The average household size was 2.58 and the average family size was 3.02.

The age distribution was 23.7% under the age of 18, 7.8% from 18 to 24, 27.8% from 25 to 44, 27.6% from 45 to 64, and 13.1% 65 or older. The median age was 38.6 years. For every 100 females, there were 100.5 males. For every 100 females age 18 and over, there were 102.3 males.

The median household income was $48,837 and the median family income was $56,107. Males had a median income of $43,287 versus $32,843 for females. The per capita income for the county was $22,192. About 8.3% of families and 10.6% of the population were below the poverty line, including 13.2% of those under age 18 and 9.5% of those age 65 or over.

=== 2000 census ===
As of the census of 2000, there were 64,742 people, 24,143 households, and 18,445 families living in the county. The population density was 102 people per square mile (39 people/km^{2}). There were 27,303 housing units at an average density of 43 units per square mile (17 units/km^{2}). The racial makeup of the county was 90.03% White, 8.13% Black or African American, 0.37% Native American, 0.17% Asian, 0.03% Pacific Islander, 0.41% from other races, and 0.85% from two or more races. 1.06% of the population were Hispanic or Latino of any race. In 2000 the largest ancestry groups in St. Clair county were:

- English 71%
- Irish 13.1%
- African 8.13%
- German 8%
- Scots-Irish 3.5%
- Dutch 2.4%
- Scottish 2%

Of the 24,143 households 35.10% had children under the age of 18 living with them, 62.80% were married couples living together, 10.00% had a female householder with no husband present, and 23.60% were non-families. 20.80% of households were one person and 8.20% were one person aged 65 or older. The average household size was 2.60 and the average family size was 3.01.

The age distribution was 25.40% under the age of 18, 7.90% from 18 to 24, 30.70% from 25 to 44, 24.30% from 45 to 64, and 11.70% 65 or older. The median age was 36 years. For every 100 females, there were 101.80 males. For every 100 females age 18 and over, there were 98.80 males.

The median household income was $37,285 and the median family income was $43,152. Males had a median income of $33,914 versus $24,433 for females. The per capita income for the county was $17,960. About 9.60% of families and 12.10% of the population were below the poverty line, including 15.20% of those under age 18 and 12.60% of those age 65 or over.

== Places of interest ==
St. Clair County is home to Logan Martin Lake. It also contains Horse Pens 40, a private outdoor park on top of Chandler Mountain.

== Politics ==
St. Clair County is a strongly Republican county. The last Democrat to win the county was Jimmy Carter in 1976.

United States presidential election results for St. Clair County, Alabama
Year	Republican		Democratic		Third party(ies)	
Year	No.	%	No.	%	No.	%
1824	14	7.53%	163	87.63%	9	4.84%
1828	7	1.50%	459	98.50%	0	0.00%
1832	0	0.00%	605	100.00%	0	0.00%
1836	26	5.31%	464	94.69%	0	0.00%
1840	42	5.83%	679	94.17%	0	0.00%
1844	46	6.67%	644	93.33%	0	0.00%
1848	150	24.75%	456	75.25%	0	0.00%
1852	44	8.82%	455	91.18%	0	0.00%
1856	0	0.00%	818	90.79%	83	9.21%
1860	0	0.00%	240	17.43%	1,137	82.57%
1868	632	59.57%	429	40.43%	0	0.00%
1872	501	38.51%	800	61.49%	0	0.00%
1876	435	27.72%	1,134	72.28%	0	0.00%
1880	496	34.49%	942	65.51%	0	0.00%
1884	661	42.05%	901	57.32%	10	0.64%
1888	640	29.77%	1,489	69.26%	21	0.98%
1892	78	2.97%	1,079	41.03%	1,473	56.01%
1896	603	26.46%	1,604	70.38%	72	3.16%
1900	1,171	47.89%	794	32.47%	480	19.63%
1904	593	30.55%	908	46.78%	440	22.67%
1908	782	43.59%	820	45.71%	192	10.70%
1912	260	14.37%	787	43.50%	762	42.12%
1916	851	44.81%	987	51.97%	61	3.21%
1920	2,561	55.04%	1,934	41.56%	158	3.40%
1924	1,432	50.64%	1,281	45.30%	115	4.07%
1928	2,581	66.25%	1,313	33.70%	2	0.05%
1932	1,449	39.43%	2,185	59.46%	41	1.12%
1936	1,464	37.73%	2,399	61.83%	17	0.44%
1940	1,540	38.27%	2,462	61.18%	22	0.55%
1944	1,117	37.86%	1,819	61.66%	14	0.47%
1948	1,063	35.67%	0	0.00%	1,917	64.33%
1952	1,590	40.54%	2,326	59.31%	6	0.15%
1956	2,441	49.07%	2,420	48.64%	114	2.29%
1960	2,589	45.90%	3,039	53.88%	12	0.21%
1964	4,813	70.76%	0	0.00%	1,989	29.24%
1968	1,635	16.86%	869	8.96%	7,193	74.18%
1972	6,952	79.82%	1,538	17.66%	220	2.53%
1976	4,877	44.87%	5,653	52.01%	339	3.12%
1980	7,768	56.89%	5,236	38.35%	650	4.76%
1984	10,408	71.02%	4,000	27.30%	246	1.68%
1988	10,604	70.71%	4,335	28.91%	58	0.39%
1992	12,447	57.56%	6,517	30.14%	2,660	12.30%
1996	12,762	62.29%	6,187	30.20%	1,540	7.52%
2000	17,117	71.05%	6,485	26.92%	488	2.03%
2004	23,500	80.59%	5,456	18.71%	205	0.70%
2008	27,649	81.11%	6,091	17.87%	348	1.02%
2012	29,031	82.39%	5,801	16.46%	403	1.14%
2016	31,651	82.42%	5,589	14.55%	1,160	3.02%
2020	36,166	81.38%	7,744	17.43%	531	1.19%
2024	35,501	81.56%	7,640	17.55%	385	0.88%

United States Senate election results for St. Clair County, Alabama2
Year	Republican		Democratic		Third party(ies)	
Year	No.	%	No.	%	No.	%
2020	35,426	79.89%	8,844	19.94%	76	0.17%

United States Senate election results for St. Clair County, Alabama3
Year	Republican		Democratic		Third party(ies)	
Year	No.	%	No.	%	No.	%
2022	23,049	82.55%	3,933	14.09%	938	3.36%

Alabama Gubernatorial election results for St. Clair County
Year	Republican		Democratic		Third party(ies)	
Year	No.	%	No.	%	No.	%
2022	23,055	82.57%	3,606	12.91%	1,262	4.52%

== Communities ==
=== Cities ===
- Ashville (county seat)
- Leeds (mostly in Jefferson County and Shelby County)
- Margaret
- Moody
- Pell City (county seat)
- Springville
- Trussville (mostly in Jefferson County)

=== Towns ===
- Argo (partly in Jefferson County)
- Odenville
- Ragland
- Riverside
- Steele
- Vincent (partly in Shelby County and Talladega County)

=== Unincorporated communities ===
- Acmar
- Cooks Springs
- Cropwell
- New London
- Pinedale Shores
- Prescott
- St. Clair Springs
- Wattsville
- Whitney

=== Former towns ===
- Branchville (now a neighborhood in Odenville)

== Transportation ==
=== Major highways ===
- Interstate 20
- Interstate 59
- U.S. Route 11 / State Route 7 (unsigned)
- U.S. Route 78 / State Route 4 (unsigned)
- U.S. Route 231 / State Route 53 (unsigned)
- U.S. Route 411 / State Route 25 (unsigned)
- State Route 23
- State Route 34
- State Route 144
- State Route 174

=== Rail ===
- Alabama and Tennessee River Railway
- Norfolk Southern Railway

Historically, the Southern Railway ran several daily passenger trains, including the Kansas City-Florida Special and an Atlanta-Birmingham section of the Piedmont Limited, making stops in Pell City. The Sunnyland made signal stops as well. The last trains made stops in 1967. Today, the nearest passenger service is Amtrak's Crescent in Anniston, 30.6 miles to the east.

== See also ==
- St. Clair County School District
- National Register of Historic Places listings in St. Clair County, Alabama
- Properties on the Alabama Register of Landmarks and Heritage in St. Clair County, Alabama
