= Properties on the Alabama Register of Landmarks and Heritage by county (Pickens–Winston) =

This is a list of properties on the Alabama Register of Landmarks and Heritage, sorted alphabetically by county. This list contains all entries for Pickens County through Winston County, the other listings may be found here. The Alabama Register of Landmarks and Heritage is an official listing of buildings, sites, structures, objects, and districts deemed worthy of preservation in the U.S. state of Alabama.

These properties, which may be of national, state, and local significance, are designated by the Alabama Historical Commission, under the authority of the Alabama Legislature. General criteria for inclusion in the Alabama Register includes that the property is at least 40 years old; is associated with events of state or local significance; is associated with the lives of persons of state or local significance; is representative of a type, style, or period of architecture; or is associated with Alabama's history or prehistory. It must also possess integrity of location and construction and convey a feeling for the time and place of construction.

The Alabama Register occasionally includes properties that do not meet the general criteria for inclusion, such as moved or reconstructed structures. These properties are included when they have been sensitively relocated to a site similar to the original, closely match the construction of the original significant building, or are of exceptional importance to the state.

There are approximately 1,711 properties and districts listed on the Alabama Register. Of these, approximately 243 are also listed on the National Register of Historic Places (NRHP) and 6 are designated as National Historic Landmarks (NHL).

Pickens – Pike – Randolph – Russell – St. Clair – Shelby – Sumter – Talladega – Tallapoosa – Tuscaloosa – Walker – Washington – Wilcox – Winston – See also – References

This list is complete through the most recent Alabama Historical Commission listings, posted January 8, 2025.

== Pickens County ==
	Site name	Date listed	City or Town	Built or Established	NRHP/NHL
1	Parks E. Ball Plantation	October 19, 1979	Aliceville	c. 1826	NRHP
2	Beard-McShan House (Melrose Plantation)	October 19, 1979	Reform vicinity	1840	
3	First Presbyterian Church	September 25, 2008	Aliceville	c. 1908	
4	Going-Craft House	October 17, 1991	Gordo vicinity	c. 1829	
5	Ingleside Plantation	January 24, 2008	Aliceville	1849	
6	Mancel-Gentry House (The White House)	February 20, 1986	Aliceville	c. 1913	
7	Merchants and Farmers Bank Building	April 14, 1982	Aliceville	1911	
8	John Turner Milner Bridge	November 5, 1976	Tombigbee River	1927	
9	Pickens County Courthouse	July 23, 1976	Carrollton	1877	NRHP
10	Pickensville Methodist Church	June 9, 1977	Pickensville	1842	
11	Pickensville Rosenwald School	December 16, 2010	Pickensville	c. 1925–1926	
12	Pilgrim's Rest Primitive Baptist Church	October 1, 1982	Carrollton	1882	
13	James M. Summerville House (Plantation House)	August 22, 1985	Aliceville	1903–05	

== Pike County ==
	Site name	Date listed	City or Town	Built or Established	NRHP/NHL
1	Academy Street High School	March 29, 2012	Troy	c. 1948	
2	Allred House	August 25, 2011	Troy	c. 1840s	
3	Bashinsky-Crow-Poole House (The Crow House)	April 11, 1984	Troy	1919–20	
4	Brundidge Historic District	September 16, 2021	Brundidge	c. 1880-1970	
5	Brundidge United Methodist Church	September 12, 2019	Brundidge	1921, 1967	
6	Carroll Street Memorial Cemetery	September 28, 2000	Troy		
7	Clay Hill Methodist Church and Cemetery	September 12, 2019	Brundidge	1921, 1967	
8	Concord Primitive Church	August 6, 2024	Brundidge	c. 1900	
9	Connor-Chapman House	August 25, 2011	Troy	c. 1878	
10	First United Methodist Church	June 30, 1995	Troy	1904	
11	Good Hope Baptist Church and Cemetery	August 4, 1978	Troy	1940s	
12	Johnston Mill	August 25, 2011	Brundidge	c. 1928–30	
13	Lightfoot House	August 6, 1993	Brundidge	1897	
14	Little Oak United Methodist Church	August 18, 1983	Troy vicinity	1908	
15	Pike Pioneer Museum	November 6, 1975	Troy	1970s	
16	St. Martin's Catholic Church	August 25, 2011	Troy	c. 1915	
17	Saint Paul AME Church and Cemetery	December 9, 2021	Brundidge	c. 1900, 1956; c. 1970s, 2017	
18	Troy Downtown Commercial Historic District	February 21, 2013	Troy	Mid 1800s–1950	
19	Troy High School (Demolished, 2010)	November 30, 1977	Troy	1919	NRHP
20	Trotter House	December 9, 2021	Goshen	c. 1892; 1995	
21	Tuskegee Army Air Field Hangar at Troy Municipal Airport	August 10, 2017	Troy	c. 1942	
22	Union Springs Primitive Baptist Church and Cemeteries	October 1, 1997	Brundidge vicinity	1880s	
23	We Piddle Around Theatre (Old City Hall)	September 12, 2019	Brundidge	1940	
24	Williams Chapel United Methodist Church & Cemetery	April 11, 1984	Brundidge	c. 1928-1929	

== Randolph County ==
	Site name	Date listed	City or Town	Built or Established	NRHP/NHL
1	Auslin's Chapel Church and Cemetery		Wedowee	c. 1875	
2	Bassett Homestead	July 15, 2021	Roanoke	c. 1914	
3	Clark Funeral Home	April 30, 2020	Roanoke	1969	
4	Gay Craft House	November 13, 1978	Wadley	c. 1840	
5	Lebanon Christian Church and Cemetery	March 30, 1989	Roanoke	c. 1880	
6	Old Riley Family Homestead (Esters Family Home)	June 18, 2015	Roanoke	1837	
7	Perry House	September 4, 1975	Wedowee	1837	

== Russell County ==
	Site name	Date listed	City or Town	Built or Established	NRHP/NHL
1	Blessed Trinity Shrine	February 19, 1976	Holy Trinity	1895	
2	Cedar Heights Plantation	October 19, 1979	Pittsview vicinity	1837	NRHP
3	Cliatt Plantation	June 16, 1978	Jernigan	1865	
4	Confederate Breastworks (Fort No. 5)	August 20, 1975	Phenix City	1863–64	NRHP
5	Crowell-Whitaker-Howard Log Cabin	January 31, 1978	Fort Mitchell	c. 1838	
6	Davis House	February 3, 1983	Phenix City	c. 1880–90	
7	Greenwood Plantation (Samuel R. Pitts House)	August 16, 1991	Pittsview	1846	NRHP
8	Kearney House	February 3, 1983	Phenix City	1890	
9	McCrory House	November 15, 2012	Phenix City	1898	
10	Morgan-Curtis House (Morgan Sanitorium)	October 19, 1979	Phenix City	1904, 1914	NRHP
11	Mother Mary Mission	June 27, 2019	Phenix City	1951-1979	
12	Parkman House	March 18, 2021	Seale	c. 1850, 1930	
13	Phenix City Elementary School	February 20, 2014	Phenix City	c. 1906	
14	South Girard High School	February 21, 2013	Phenix City	c. 1961	
15	Southern Railway Depot Building (Demolished)	February 4, 1981	Hurtsboro	1884	
16	Trinity United Methodist Church	February 3, 1983	Phenix City	1872	
17	Tuckabatchie Masonic Lodge No. 96	July 6, 1978	Crawford	1948	
18	Augustus Benning Walker House	July 22, 1991	Hatchechubbee	c. 1892	
19	Williams-Holland House	January 14, 1980	Phenix City	1884	
20	Zadie Young Cottage	October 31, 2013	Phenix City	c. 1910	

== St. Clair County ==
	Site name	Date listed	City or Town	Built or Established	NRHP/NHL
1	Acmar Civic Center	November 9, 2017	Acmar	c. 1905	
2	Adams House	June 25, 2002	Moody vicinity	c. 1926	
3	John Ash House	November 2, 1990	Ashville	c. 1820	NRHP
4	Ashville Masonic Lodge	August 3, 1990	Ashville	1853–58	
5	Ashville Historic District	1973	Ashville	c. 1824-1830; 19th century	NRHP
6	Bothwell-Embry House	October 19, 1979	Ashville	1835	NRHP
7	Leroy Box House	June 30, 1995	Ashville	1896	
8	Cason-Tipton House	October 1, 1997	Ashville	c. 1873	
9	James Forman House	August 3, 1990	Odenville vicinity	c. 1850	
10	Harkey's Chapel Methodist Church	July 21, 1978	Ragland vicinity	1903–04	
11	Mays Bend Family Cemetery	June 30, 1995	Pell City vicinity	1837	
12	Merry Oakes Inn (Dr. J. T. Brown Home)	May 21, 1981	Riverside	1872	
13	Montgomery-Ritchie House (Judge Elisha Robinson House)	November 4, 1987	Ashville	1890	NRHP
14	Newton Homestead	November 2, 1990	Ashville	c. 1817	NRHP
15	O'Donnell's Mill (Gibson's Mill) (destroyed by flood)	November 13, 1978	Ashville vicinity	c. 1840	
16	Reeves Grove Baptist Church & Cemetery	March 29, 2018	Steele	c. 1872	
17	Riser House (Evans-Eatman House)	March 5, 1976	Pell City	1890	
18	Shanks House	December 16, 2010	Ashville	c. 1930	
19	Springville Historic District	March 8, 1994	Springville	1873–1980s	NRHP
20	Springville Lake Estates	August 6, 2024	Springville	c. 1960	
21	Steele Cemetery	July 21, 1978	Steele	1880	
22	St. Clair County Training School	April 7, 2021	Pell City	c. 1921	
23	Union United Methodist Church	July 21, 1978	Steele vicinity	1921	

== Shelby County ==
	Site name	Date listed	City or Town	Built or Established	NRHP/NHL
1	1854 Shelby County Courthouse	January 25, 2011	Columbiana	1854	NRHP
2	Archer House	July 21, 1978	Westover	1880s, 1910	
3	Arkwright Baptist Church	May 19, 2011	Arkwright	c. 1917, 1957, 1966	
4	Arkwright Heritage Area	August 25, 2011	Arkwright	Prehistory–1940s	
5	Bel May Farm	April 11, 1984	Montevallo	c. 1869	
6	The Brick House	February 19, 1988	Shelby	c. 1940-1950	
7	Buck Creek District	July 5, 1978	Helena	c. 1865	
8	Buck Creek Jail & Water Tower	March 29, 2018	Alabaster	c. 1916	
9	Calera Downtown Historic District	June 24, 2004	Calera	1884–1964	NRHP
10	Calera Presbyterian Church	March 12, 1997	Calera	1885	
11	Carter Residence (The Bowden Home)	March 29, 1977	Calera	1915	
12	Chancellor House	November 26, 1978	Harpersville	1935	NRHP
13	Cowart Drug Store	February 15, 1977	Calera	c. 1885	
14	Cunningham-Stamps House	January 31, 1979	Montevallo vicinity	c. 1828	
15	Crane Home	February 21, 2019	Chelsea	c. 1897	
16	John E. Densler House	September 28, 2000	Wilsonville	1879	
17	Don H. Loveday Memorial Bridge	August 5, 2010	Montevallo	1932–1936	
18	Ebenezer Church	July 21, 1978	Montevallo vicinity	1891	
19	Falkner School	March 21, 1978	Vandiver	c. 1850	
20	Farrington Hall	January 24, 2008	Montevallo	c. 1908	NRHP
21	Frost-Sorrell Log House (Crowson-Ward House)	March 29, 1977	Montevallo	c. 1820	
22	Harpersville Heritage Area	January 22, 2009	Harpersville		
23	Harrison House	April 11, 1978	Montevallo	1887	
24	Jackson's Fourmile Farm	April 1, 2010	Fourmile	c. 1850	
25	Jones-Bailey Cemetery	November 13, 1978	Calera	1860	
26	Klein-Wallace Home	January 18, 1978	Harpersville	1841	
27	Lesters Chapel United Methodist Church	December 16, 2010	Columbiana	c. 1950	
28	McClellan House (Indian Springs Village Town Hall)	October 31, 2013	Indian Springs Village	c. 1920s	
29	McGaughy Farms	February 15, 1977	Montevallo	1840–45	
30	McKibbon House	July 21, 1978	Montevallo	1884	NRHP
31	Meredith-McLaughlin House (McLaughlin Farm)	October 4, 1978	Maylene	c. 1820	
32	Mt. Calvary Baptist Church	April 16, 1985	Chelsea	1905	
33	Montevallo Coal Mine Company Store	August 5, 2010	Aldrich	1928	
34	Old Shelby Hotel (destroyed by fire in 2019)	September 14, 1977	Shelby	1900	
35	O'Neal Lime Works Kilns	June 27, 2019	Calera	1880 & 1895	
36	People's Hotel (Demolished)	March 25, 1976	Calera	1909	
37	Perry Hall (Shoal Creek Farm)	September 17, 1976	Montevallo	1834	
38	Railey House	November 26, 1978	Vincent	1890	
39	Rock House (Eastis House)	December 4, 1992	Harpersville	c. 1835	NRHP
40	Scott-Bradford Home	January 18, 1978	Harpersville vicinity	1824, 1830s	
41	Shoal Creek Mill Dam Site	May 22, 2008	Montevallo	c. 1890s	
42	Vincent Gin (Florey Gin)	January 22, 2009	Vincent		
43	Weldon General Store (demolished)	December 1, 2016	Chelsea	c. 1921	
44	Wilson-Albright Log Cabin	February 6, 1978	Montevallo	c. 1820	
45	Wilson-Lathem-Taff House	February 28, 1979	Montevallo	c. 1880	
46	Woods-Cleveland-Cooling House	November 16, 1978	Wilton	c. 1845	

== Sumter County ==
	Site name	Date listed	City or Town	Built or Established	NRHP/NHL
1	Bethel Chapel and Cemetery	March 24, 2005	Sumterville vicinity	Chapel 1908, Cemetery 1839	
2	Branch-Stuart Home	March 29, 1977	Livingston	1903	
3	Christian Lodge #217	March 8, 2023	Cuba	c. 1905	
4	Farview	March 25, 2004	Sumterville vicinity	c. 1837	
5	Gainesville Historic District	March 25, 1976	Gainesville	Early 19th century	NRHP
6	Geiger School	May 10, 2000	Geiger	1911–12	
7	Hawkins House	June 25, 1981	Epes	1848	
8	Inge-Moon House	February 19, 1988	Livingston	c. 1834	
9	Lakewood	February 12, 2015	Livingston	c. 1840–1930s	
10	Oakhurst	January 14, 1980	Emelle	Early 1850s	NRHP
11	Rural Training and Research Center	December 9, 2021	Epes	c. 1963; c. 1970	NRHP
12	Sumter County High School	September 16, 2021	York	c. 1912	
13	St. James Episcopal Church	April 11, 1984	Livingston	c. 1840	
14	Twin Magnolias	March 12, 1997	Coatopa	c. 1860	
15	Voss-Pate House	April 11, 1984	Livingston	c. 1850	
16	Ward-Ganguet-Gray House	November 17, 1995	Cuba	1860–70	NRHP
17	Zion Hill Methodist Church and Cemetery	May 6, 2020	Coatopa	c. 1870	

== Talladega County ==
	Site name	Date listed	City or Town	Built or Established	NRHP/NHL
1	Alpine Baptist Church	March 29, 2018	Alpine	c. 1871	
2	Alpine Plantation	October 25, 2018	Alpine	1858	
3	Bemiston Mill Village	December 1, 2008	Talladega	1927	
4	Brown House	March 24, 2005	Talladega	c. 1924	
5	Butler-Harris-Rainwater House	June 23, 1994	Childersburg	c. 1890s	NRHP
6	Cunningham Estates	April 28, 2023	Eastaboga	c. 1950s	
7	DeForest Chapel	June 9, 1977	Talladega	1904	
8	DeSoto Caverns	July 19, 1976	Childersburg	Prehistoric	
9	W.C. Dowdell House (Boxwood)	October 22, 1982	Talladega	1854	NRHP
10	East Highland High School	September 27, 2007	Sylacauga vicinity	c. 1952	
11	Fairfax Station	November 17, 1995	Alpine vicinity	1850	
12	Fort Williams Cemetery	May 12, 1976	Fayetteville vicinity	1813	
13	Gantts Quarry Post Office	November 16, 2024	Sylacauga	c. 1905	
14	Birdie Guy House	January 14, 1980	Sylacauga	Late 19th century	
15	Hendrick House	February 28, 1979	Talladega vicinity	1835–40	
16	Hightower Brothers Livery Stable	November 13, 1996	Sylacauga	1914–46	NRHP
17	Idlewild	March 19, 1993	Talladega vicinity	c. 1843	NRHP
18	Jemison-Turner House	December 15, 1989	Eastaboga vicinity	1836–37	NRHP
19	Lanning-Livingston Home	November 14, 1980	Sylacauga	1901	
20	Lawler-Whiting House (Orangevale)	October 8, 1981	Talladega vicinity	1852–54	NRHP
21	Marble City Cemetery	November 17, 1995	Sylacauga	1898	
22	Merkl House	June 24, 2004	Lincoln	1889–1940	
23	Mt. Canaan Baptist Church	April 11, 1984	Talladega		
24	Munford High School	September 26, 2007	Munford	c. 1910	
25	Ogletree House	March 22, 1991	Eastaboga vicinity	c. 1845	
26	Old Town Lincoln Commercial Historic District	March 7, 2002	Lincoln	1883–1959	
27	Ophelia S. Hill School	September 29, 2005	Munford	c. 1919	
28	Porch-Drake House	February 6, 1978	Sylacauga	1914–15	
29	Robinson House (Baker House)	August 6, 1976	Childersburg vicinity	c. 1885	
30	St. Peter's Episcopal Church	July 7, 1980	Talladega	1927	
31	Smith House (Towassa)	February 6, 1998	Sylacauga	1909	
32	Strozier Building	September 20, 2006	Childersburg	c. 1890	
33	Sugar Hill House	February 21, 2019	Sylacauga	1870	
34	Sylacauga Cemetery	September 15, 1975	Sylacauga	1832–1900	
35	Talladega Public Library	June 10, 1976	Talladega	1908	
36	Tallasahatchie First Baptist Church and Cemetery	October 9, 2014	Alpine	c. 1838	
37	The Cedars Plantation	August 5, 2010	Munford	1838	
38	The Community House	August 5, 2010	Talladega	1926	
39	The Oaks (Burns Home)	October 1, 1997	Lincoln	1898, 1906	
40	Truss-Law-Watson House	September 26, 2003	Lincoln	c. 1853	
41	Wallis House	January 31, 1978	Talladega vicinity	1832	
42	Westview Cemetery (Needmore Cemetery)	August 19, 1981	Talladega	1890	
43	Wren Manor	February 21, 2013	Talladega	c. 1934	

== Tallapoosa County ==
	Site name	Date listed	City or Town	Built or Established	NRHP/NHL
1	Browning House	February 27, 1978	Dadeville	1850s	
2	Camp Hill Historic District	July 15, 2021	Camp Hill	c. 1895-1965	
3	Coley-Joiner House	March 30, 1989	Alexander City	c. 1895	NRHP
4	Dadeville Historic District	June 21, 2012	Dadeville	c. 1850–1972	NRHP
5	Dillard's Cemetery	March 13, 1996	Hackneyville	1860	
6	First Universalist Church of Camp Hill	March 13, 1996	Camp Hill	1907	
7	Martin Dam (Shared with Elmore County)	January 5, 1976	Tallapoosa River		
8	McClendon-Mayfield House	July 29, 1977	Kellyton	1851	
9	New Adka Church and School	December 10, 2020	Dadeville	c. 1950	
10	Old Elkahatchee Creek Bridge	September 26, 2003	Alexander City vicinity	1931	
11	Patterson Log Cabin	March 8, 2023	Tallassee	c. 1845	
12	Pleasant Ridge Baptist Church	June 20, 1978	Dadeville vicinity	1882	
13	Smith Mountain Fire Tower	November 15, 2012	Dadeville	c. 1939	
14	Tallapoosa Hall at Lyman Ward Military Academy	January 24, 2008	Camp Hill	Early 20th century	
15	Fred Walker Young House	March 8, 1994	Alexander City	1900	

== Tuscaloosa County ==
	Site name	Date listed	City or Town	Built or Established	NRHP/NHL
1	2600 Block of Old Broad Street (University Boulevard)	June 20, 2013	Tuscaloosa	1890s–1940s	
2	Alabama Book Store (University of Alabama)	September 25, 2008	Tuscaloosa	c. 1939	NRHP
3	Alabama Great Southern Railroad Station	October 19, 1979	Tuscaloosa	1911	
4	Audubon Place Historic District	November 24, 1982	Tuscaloosa	1912	NRHP
5	Bama Theatre (City Hall)	June 30, 1983	Tuscaloosa	1938	NRHP
6	Big Creek Cemetery and Church Site	November 17, 1995	Coker vicinity	1833	
7	Brown House	July 31, 1975	Tuscaloosa	1870	
8	Bucksville Cemetery	September 30, 1999	McCalla vicinity	1832	
9	Caplewood Drive Historic District	April 11, 1984	Tuscaloosa		NRHP
10	Christ Episcopal Church	July 28, 1975	Tuscaloosa	c. 1830	
11	Clements House (Isaac Lee Home-Old Buckhouse Place)	July 28, 1975	Northport	1850s	
12	College Park Historic District	April 14, 1992	Tuscaloosa		
13	Dearing Place Historic District	April 14, 1992	Tuscaloosa		
14	Dorroh House (Jim Winn Place)	July 28, 1975	Romulus vicinity	c. 1830	
15	Drish House (Drish Mansion)	July 31, 1975	Tuscaloosa	1837	NRHP
16	Eighth Street Historic District	July 22, 1991	Tuscaloosa	1910–37	
17	Espy Bridge (North River Bridge) (dismantled, location unknown)	September 28, 204	Tuscaloosa	c. 1896	
18	First Baptist Church	August 6, 1993	Northport	1913	
19	Alston Fitts House	April 14, 1992	Tuscaloosa		
20	Gilgal Baptist Church	September 16, 2021	Duncanville	c. 1856-1965	
21	Greenwood Cemetery	July 26, 1983	Tuscaloosa	1821	
22	Anthony Hughes House (James Hughes Farm)	April 18, 2008	Buhl		
23	Hunter Chapel AME Zion Church	August 5, 2010	Tuscaloosa	1910	
24	Jemison-Borghese House	July 31, 1975	Tuscaloosa	1860–1862	NRHP
25	Kennedy-Foster House	July 31, 1975	Tuscaloosa	1870	NRHP
26	Kilgore House (demolished c. 2013)	February 19, 1988	Tuscaloosa	1869	
27	Martin-Gulliver House (demolished by 4/27/2011 tornado)	June 19, 1996	Tuscaloosa	1940	
28	Maxwell-Peters House	July 31, 1975	Northport	1865–70	
29	Maxwell-Richardson-Hellums House	July 28, 1975	Tuscaloosa	1906	
30	Will Murphy House (Murphy-Collins House)	April 14, 1992	Tuscaloosa	c. 1923	NRHP
31	North River Hunt Club (all buildings moved to different location)	October 12, 1976	Tuscaloosa vicinity	1970s	
32	Oakwood Court Historic District	September 25, 2005	Tuscaloosa	c. 1910–45	
33	Old Tuscaloosa County Jail (V.F.W. Club)	July 31, 1975	Tuscaloosa	c. 1835	NRHP
34	Phi Kappa Psi Fraternity House	June 1, 1982	Tuscaloosa	1931, 1936	
35	Pinehurst Historic District	April 11, 1984	Tuscaloosa	1908–35	NRHP
36	Saint John The Baptist Catholic Church	June 12, 1975	Tuscaloosa	1846	
37	Searcy House (Old Library)	July 28, 1975	Tuscaloosa	1904	NRHP
38	Seventh Street District	October 28, 1985	Tuscaloosa	Early 20th century	
39	Shirley Bridge (destroyed in traffic accident, 1998)	February 15, 1977	Echola	1882, 1922	
40	Smelson House	July 31, 1975	Tuscaloosa	c. 1830	
41	Stillman College Campus Historic District	June 23, 2016	Tuscaloosa	c. 1922–1976	NRHP
42	Thirteenth Street Residential Historic District	May 19, 1999	Tuscaloosa		
43	The House at Vance's Station	August 24, 2022	Vance	1873; c. 1927	
44	Tuscaloosa City Hall (Old Post Office)	September 15, 1975	Tuscaloosa	1910	
45	Union Chapel United Methodist Church & Cemetery	August 25, 2011	Northport	c. 1962	
46	University Circle	June 24, 2004	Tuscaloosa	1936–45	
47	Warren House	July 6, 1976	Samantha	c. 1820	
48	Watson-Jones House (The "Salt House")	July 31, 1975	Northport vicinity	1831–45	
49	White-Sullivan Log Cabin	August 3, 1990	Elrod	Mid 1840s	
50	Winn-Rice House	August 13, 1987	Northport	c. 1840, 1985	

== Walker County ==
	Site name	Date listed	City or Town	Built or Established	NRHP/NHL
1	Alabama Mining Museum	August 18, 1983	Dora	Early 1930s	
2	William B. Bankhead Home	February 21, 2013	Jasper	c. 1924	NRHP
3	Confederate Monument	May 19, 1999	Jasper	1907	
4	William Cook House	March 23, 1990	Nauvoo	c. 1900	
5	Davis Cemetery	November 13, 1996	Dora	1847	
6	William C. Davis House	September 29, 2005	Jasper	c. 1902	
7	Carl Elliott House	January 24, 2008	Jasper	c. 1913–64	
8	First Presbyterian Church	December 19, 1983	Jasper		
9	First United Methodist Church	January 31, 1983	Jasper	1914	NRHP
10	Fite-Taylor House	June 22, 1981	Jasper	1912	
11	Harbin Hotel	August 3, 1990	Nauvoo	1923	
12	Dr. C.B. Jackson House	August 6, 1993	Dora	1902	
13	Jasper Community Hospital (Walker County Hospital)	September 6, 1984	Jasper	1923	NRHP
14	Dr. Stephenson House	January 27, 1976	Oakman	c. 1890	
15	Tubbs Cemetery	December 4, 1992	Oakman vicinity	1840	
16	Wyatt School at the Alabama Mining Museum	June 12, 2014	Dora	1926	

== Washington County ==
	Site name	Date listed	City or Town	Built or Established	NRHP/NHL
1	Calvert United Methodist Church & Cemetery	December 16, 2010	Calvert	c. 1889	
2	Fruitdale Church of the Brethren	May 19, 1998	Fruitdale	1904	
3	Garris Hill	May 19, 1998	Leroy	1904, 1920	
4	Johnson House	March 18, 2021	Leroy	1927	
5	St. Stephens Methodist Church	March 25, 1976	St. Stephens	c. 1857	
6	St. Stephens Masonic Lodge	October 11, 1978	St. Stephens	1853	NRHP
7	Gibeon Jefferson Sullivan Cabin	August 5, 2010	Wagarville vicinity	1874	
8	Taylor House (Washington County State Bank)	April 16, 1985	Leroy	1843	
9	Tibbie Store (Tibbie Post Office)	May 19, 1999	Tibbie	c. 1920s	
10	Washington Baptist Church & Cemetery	December 16, 2010	Wagarville	c. 1916	
11	Williams-Turner House	July 7, 1980	Sunflower	1871	

== Wilcox County ==
	Site name	Date listed	City or Town	Built or Established	NRHP/NHL
1	Ackerville Baptist Church	July 22, 1991	Ackerville	1848	NRHP
2	Antioch Baptist Church	November 13, 1996	Camden	1870, 1924	
3	Beck-Creswell House	November 13, 1996	Camden	1855	
4	Beck-Darwin House	October 19, 1979	Camden vicinity	1845	NRHP
5	Camden African American Historic District	June 14, 2018	Camden	c. 1900–1971	
6	Camden Academy	June 27, 2019	Camden	c. 1873-1974	
7	Cathcart House	March 23, 1990	Alberta	c. 1840s	
8	Cedarcrest	April 21, 1981	Oak Hill	1840–46	
9	Cook Hill	October 19, 1979	Camden vicinity	c. 1839	
10	Creagh-Glover Family Cemetery	March 22, 1991	Catherine vicinity	1826	
11	Dulaney AME Church and Cemetery	April 18, 2007	Rosebud	c. 1914	
12	First Baptist Church "Colored"	December 19, 2019	Pine Apple	1969	
13	Gee's Bend Farms Community School	March 30, 1989	Gee's Bend	1937	
14	Griffin House	July 21, 1978	Arlington	c. 1838	
15	G.W. Watts High School	December 19, 2019	Pine Apple	1962	
16	Hawthorne House	November 9, 1992	Pine Apple	1854	NRHP
17	Hope Well Church	May 19, 1999	Furman	1864	
18	William S. Irby Sr. House	December 4, 1992	Lower Peach Tree	1900	
19	Kaster House (Demolished)	November 6, 1980	Camden	c. 1860	
20	Moore Academy School	June 30, 1995	Pine Apple	1923	
21	Bessie Munden Park	August 25, 2011	Camden	c. 1949	
22	New Virgin Baptist Church	December 19, 2019	Pine Apple	1936 & 1961	
23	Prairie Mission School	July 22, 1991	Catherine vicinity	c. 1894	NRHP
24	Primm-Rouse-Dunnam House	October 17, 1980	Camden	c. 1906	
25	Reeves Chapel Methodist Church and Cemetery	July 7, 1980	Camden vicinity	c. 1900	
26	Snow Hill Institute	July 14, 1981	Snow Hill	1893–1925	NRHP
27	Stanford House	September 28, 2004	Pine Apple	c. 1870	
28	Sterrett House	April 14, 1992	Camden	1851	
29	White Columns (Tait-Starr Plantation)	March 25, 1976	Camden vicinity	1860	

== Winston County ==
	Site name	Date listed	City or Town	Built or Established	NRHP/NHL
1	Haleyville City Hall (Home of the first 911 call)	July 12, 2013	Haleyville	c. 1950	
2	Feldman's Department Store	September 28, 2004	Haleyville	1914	NRHP
3	Ingle-Blake House (Demolished 1982)	February 6, 1981	Double Springs	1886	
4	Looney's Tavern Site	September 17, 1976	Addison vicinity	1861	
5	Palmer-Feldman House	September 20, 2006	Haleyville	c. 1902	

== See also ==
- Properties on the Alabama Register of Landmarks and Heritage by county (Autauga–Choctaw)
- Properties on the Alabama Register of Landmarks and Heritage by county (Clarke–Dallas)
- Properties on the Alabama Register of Landmarks and Heritage by county (DeKalb–Jackson)
- Properties on the Alabama Register of Landmarks and Heritage by county (Jefferson–Macon)
- Properties on the Alabama Register of Landmarks and Heritage by county (Madison–Perry)
