= National Register of Historic Places listings in St. Clair County, Alabama =

Location of St. Clair County in Alabama

This is a list of the National Register of Historic Places listings in St. Clair County, Alabama.

This is intended to be a complete list of the properties and districts on the National Register of Historic Places in St. Clair County, Alabama, United States. Latitude and longitude coordinates are provided for many National Register properties and districts; these locations may be seen together in a Google map.

There are 15 properties and districts listed on the National Register in the county.

This National Park Service list is complete through NPS recent listings posted October 23, 2026.

== Current listings ==
	Name on the Register	Image	Date listed	Location	City or town	Description
1	John Ash House	John Ash House	October 1, 1991 (#91001479)	U.S. Route 411 west of its junction with U.S. Route 231; 33°46′16″N 86°18′09″W	Ashville	
2	Ashville Historic District	Ashville Historic District	April 20, 2005 (#05000288)	Bounded by State Route 23, Greensport Rd., 8th Ave., Waldrop Dr., State Route 231, and 5th St. 33°50′08″N 86°15′12″W	Ashville	
3	Avondale Mill Historic District	Avondale Mill Historic District	August 31, 2000 (#00001030)	Roughly bounded by 25th St., N., 7th Ave., N., 30th St., N., and south of 4th Ave., N. 33°35′33″N 86°16′42″W	Pell City	
4	Dr. James J. Bothwell House	Dr. James J. Bothwell House	February 4, 1982 (#82004612)	Hartford Ave. 33°50′06″N 86°15′17″W	Ashville	
5	Fort Strother Site	Fort Strother Site	July 24, 1972 (#72001440)	Off Lock 3 Road along the Coosa River; 33°45′49″N 86°02′51″W	Ohatchee vicinity	
6	Jacob Green House		January 20, 1980 (#80004238)	East of Ashville on State Route 33; 33°53′09″N 86°07′03″W	Ashville	
7	Inzer House	Inzer House	December 4, 1973 (#73002127)	Hartford Ave. 33°50′08″N 86°15′19″W	Ashville	
8	Looney House	Looney House	December 31, 1974 (#74002179)	5 miles west of Ashville on Greenport Rd. 33°49′16″N 86°11′33″W	Ashville	
9	Rev. Thomas Newton House	Rev. Thomas Newton House	October 11, 1991 (#91001480)	South of U.S. Route 411, west of its junction with U.S. Route 231; 33°45′22″N 86°18′58″W	Ashville	
10	Old Pell City Historic District	Old Pell City Historic District	November 29, 2001 (#01001291)	Roughly bounded by 16th St., N., 1st Ave., N., 22nd St., N., and 4th Ave., N. 33°35′17″N 86°17′10″W	Pell City	
11	Pell City Downtown Historic District	Pell City Downtown Historic District	October 29, 2001 (#01001169)	1900-2111 Cogwell Ave, 2008 1st Ave., S., 8 N. 21st St., and 10 S. 20th St. 33°35′11″N 86°17′04″W	Pell City	
12	Presley Store	Presley Store	January 11, 1983 (#83002982)	601 Main St. 33°46′30″N 86°28′18″W	Springville	
13	Judge Elisha Robinson House	Judge Elisha Robinson House	May 13, 1991 (#91000595)	U.S. Route 231 south of its junction with State Route 23; 33°50′05″N 86°15′19″W	Ashville	
14	St. Clair Springs		April 26, 1976 (#76002140)	State Route 23; 33°45′51″N 86°24′17″W	St. Clair Springs	
15	Springville Historic District	Springville Historic District	July 3, 1997 (#97000653)	Roughly bounded by Academy, Wilson, and Cross Sts., the Norfolk Southern railroad tracks, Industrial Dr., and Sarusce St. 33°46′33″N 86°28′14″W	Springville	

== See also ==
- List of National Historic Landmarks in Alabama
- National Register of Historic Places listings in Alabama
