= Springville Historic District =

Springville Historic District may refer to:

- Springville Historic District (Springville, Alabama), listed on the National Register of Historic Places in St. Clair County, Alabama
- Springville Historic District (Springville, Utah), listed on the National Register of Historic Places in Utah County, Utah
