= John W. Inzer Museum =

- Inzer House
- U.S. National Register of Historic Places
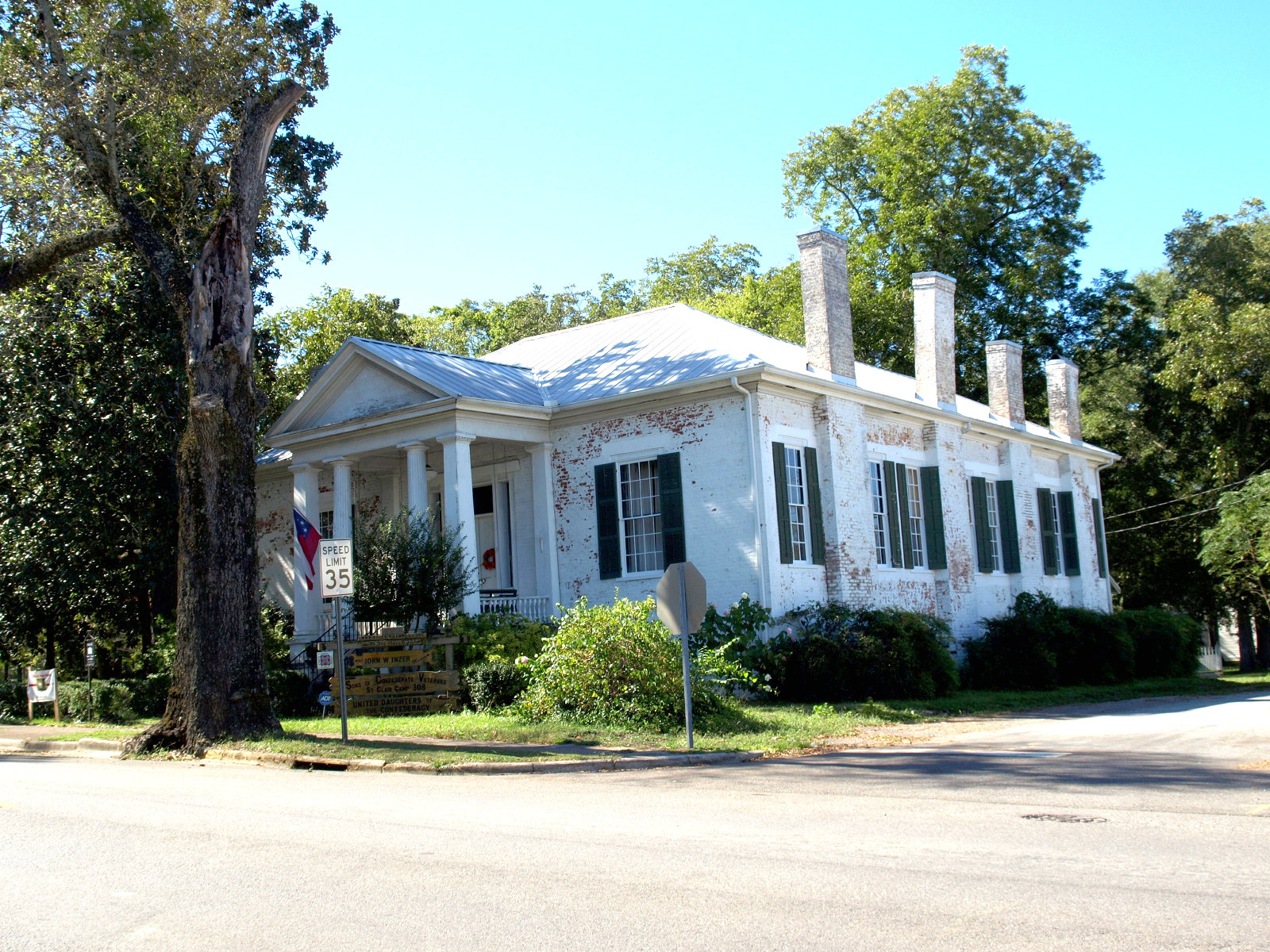
- The house in October 2014

- Location within Alabama Location within the United States
- Interactive map showing the location of John W. Inzer Museum
- Location: 229 5th St., Ashville, Alabama
- Coordinates: 33°50′08″N 86°15′19″W
- Built: 1852
- Part of: Ashville Historic District (ID05000288)
- NRHP reference No.: 73002127
- Added to NRHP: December 4, 1973

The John W. Inzer Museum (also known as the Inzer House and the Dean–Inzer House) is a historic residence and museum in Ashville, Alabama. The house was listed on the National Register of Historic Places in 1973.

== History ==
The house was built in 1852 for Moses Dean, one of the earliest landowners in Ashville who arrived in the area as early as 1825. In 1866, the house was purchased by John Washington Inzer. Inzer moved to Alabama from Georgia in 1854, and read law with John Tyler Morgan and A. J. Walker in Talladega. He moved to Ashville in 1856 to open a law office, and was appointed temporary probate judge of St. Clair County in 1859. Inzer was the county's delegate to Alabama's secession convention in January 1861, after which he served in the Confederate States Army. After the Civil War, he returned to Ashville and served several stints as judge and in the Alabama State Senate.

Following Inzer's death in 1928, the home remained as a family residence until 1987. The home was given to the local branch of the Sons of Confederate Veterans and opened as a museum the following year. The museum houses furniture and artifacts from Inzer's life, focusing on his role in Confederate history. The museum is open by appointment only, and receives public funding from the state, as much as $25,000 in each of 2022 and 2023.

== Architecture ==
The Greek Revival house sits on a 4-acre (1.6 ha) lot one block south of the St. Clair County Courthouse. The three-bay façade has a small portico with four columns, the center two are round with fluting and the outside two are square, all with Doric capitals and bases. Four chimneys lie along the north wall and two on the south wall, piercing the hipped roof. Windows on the façade are 12-over-12 sashes, while the side windows are 9-over-9. The interior has a double-pile center-hall plan, with a bedroom and parlor in front of two bedrooms flanking the hall. A stained glass arch separates the front and rear halls. A rear ell contains another bedroom and the dining room. The detached kitchen included servant living quarters.
