= Senator Ashe =

Senator Ashe may refer to:

- Samuel Ashe (North Carolina governor) (1725–1813), North Carolina State Senate
- Thomas Samuel Ashe (1812–1887), North Carolina State Senate and Confederate States Senate
- Tim Ashe (born 1976), Vermont State Senate
- Victor Ashe (born 1945), Tennessee State Senate
- William S. Ashe (1814–1862), North Carolina State Senate

== See also ==
- John Ash (American politician) (1783–1872), Alabama State Senate
