= Alabama State Route 23 =

State highway in Alabama, United States

State Route 23

Route information
- Maintained by ALDOT
- Length: 12.611 mi (20.295 km)
- Existed: 1953–present

Major junctions
- South end: US 11 at Springville
- I-59 near Springville
- North end: US 231 / US 411 at Ashville

Location
- Country: United States
- State: Alabama
- Counties: St. Clair

Highway system
- Alabama State Highway System; Interstate; US; State
← SR 22	→ SR 24

State Route 23 (SR 23) is a 12.611-mile-long (20.295 km) state highway in St. Clair County. The highway serves as a connector between U.S. Route 11 (US 11) in Springville and US 231/US 411 in Ashville. Although signed as a north–south route, the orientation of SR 23 is virtually east–west. Besides the intersections with US 11 and US 231/US 411, the only other route that SR 23 intersects is Interstate 59 (I-59) near Springville.

== History ==
Prior to 1953, SR 23 was concurrent with US 11 between Springville and Gadsden, and with US 411 between Gadsden and Centre. Northeast of Centre, SR 23 continued along the route of present-day SR 9. By 1956, the route assumed its current alignment.

== Major intersections ==
The entire route is in St. Clair County.

Location	mi	km	Destinations	Notes
Springville	0.000	0.000	US 11 (SR 7)	Southern terminus
	0.398	0.641	I-59 – Gadsden, Birmingham	I-59 exit 156
Ashville	12.611	20.295	US 231 / US 411 (5th Street / 6th Avenue / Court Street / SR 25 / SR 53)	Northern terminus
1.000 mi = 1.609 km; 1.000 km = 0.621 mi
