= Looney House =

Historic house in Alabama, United States

- U.S. National Register of Historic Places
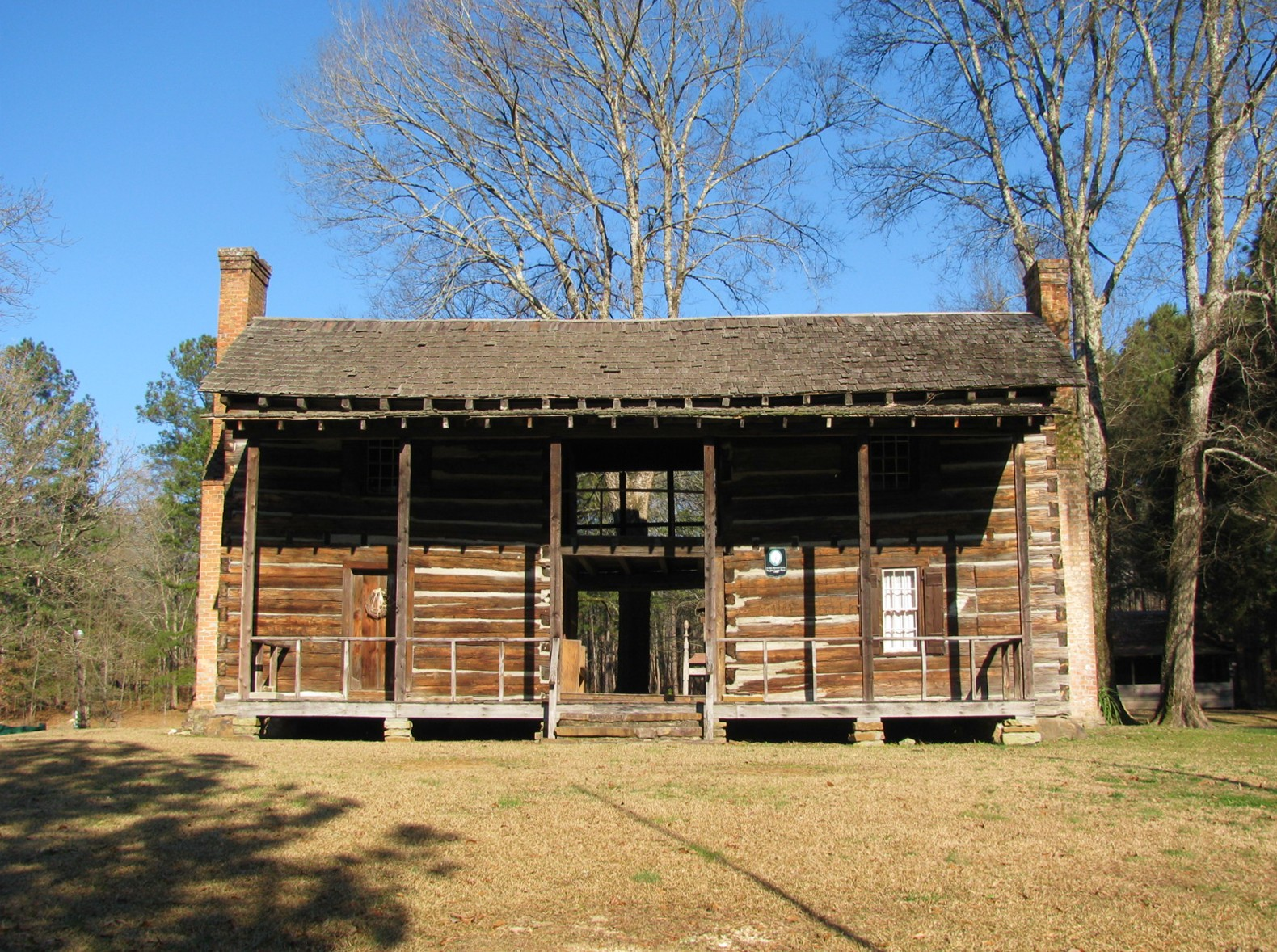
- The house in January 2010

- Location within Alabama Location within the United States
- Location: 5 miles west of Ashville, Alabama on Greenport Rd.
- Coordinates: 33°49′16″N 86°11′33″W
- Area: less than one acre
- Built: 1818
- NRHP reference No.: 74002179
- Added to NRHP: December 31, 1974

The Looney House is a historic residence near Ashville, Alabama. The dogtrot house was built in 1818 by Henry Looney and his father John. Henry Looney was a veteran of the War of 1812 and fought at the Battle of Horseshoe Bend and Fort Strother under the command of Andrew Jackson. The house was built near the creek 7 miles (11 km) from the city of Ashville. In 1820, it was moved further up the hill along the creek as a result of the large number of mosquitoes in the area during the summertime being an unbearable annoyance to the family. Jane Rutherford, daughter of John and Peggy Ash (for whom Ashville was named), married Henry Looney in 1838.

In 1892 the house was sold to brothers John L. and Sam Houston Lonnergan. The Lonnergan family sold the house to Joseph R. Creitz in 1947, who in turn sold it to the St. Clair County Historical Society for restoration as a museum.

The house was listed on the National Register of Historic Places in 1974.

On August 6, 2022, the house was "heavily damaged" by a fire.

On August 8, 2022, the St. Clair County Sheriff's Office released a statement saying that at that time the cause of the fire was believed to be arson. The rear of the home and roof of the 200-year-old home was destroyed.
