= Confederate Monument (Ashville, Alabama) =

Monument to the Confederacy in Ashville, Alabama

Confederate Soldiers Monument
- United States
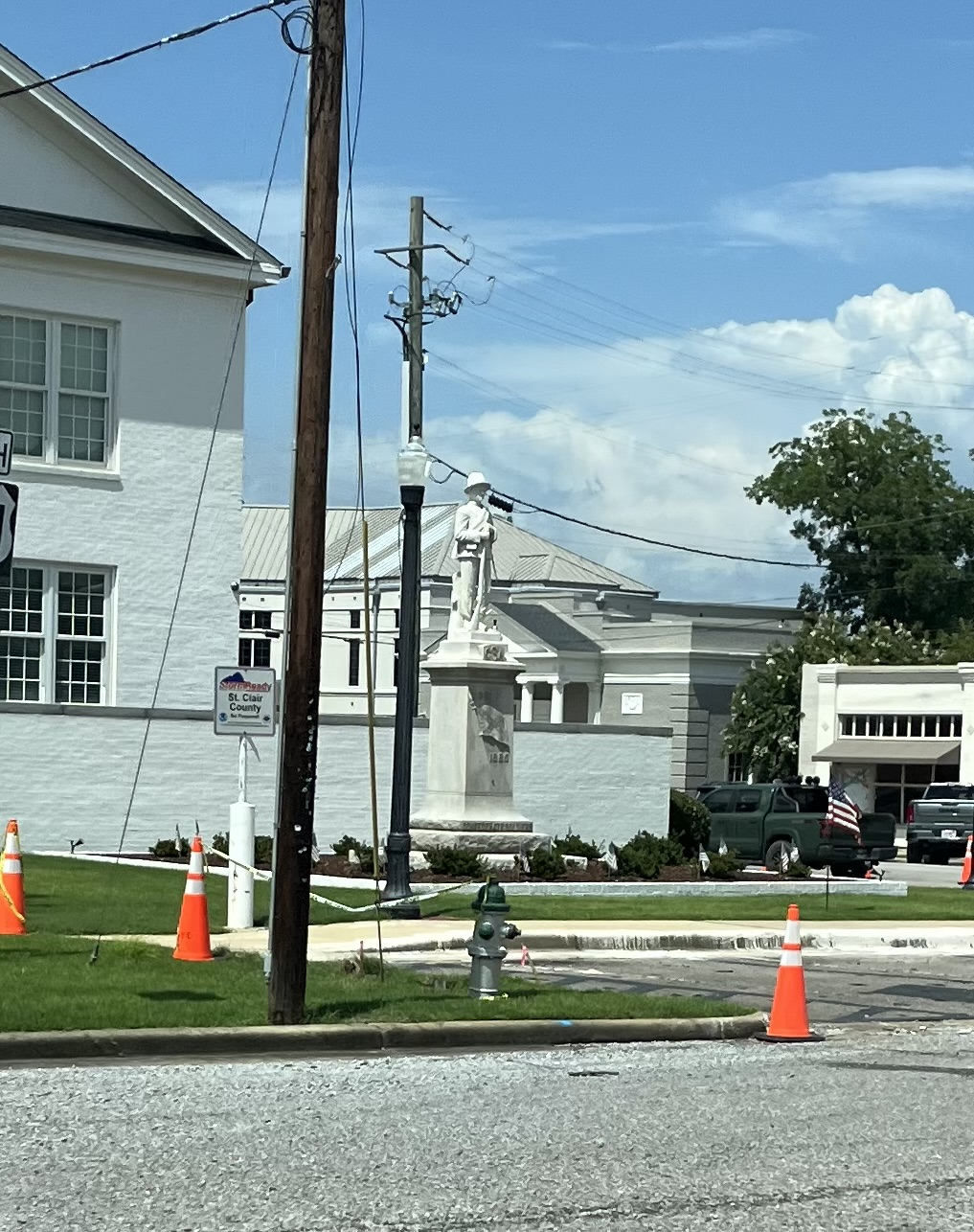
- Monument in beside the St. Clair County courthouse
- For Confederate Soldiers
- Established: 1923
- Location: 33.83671°N 86.25477°W; Ashville Historic District, Ashville, Alabama

The Confederate Soldiers Monument is a monument to the soldiers from St. Clair County, Alabama who fought for the Confederate States of America (CSA) during the American Civil War. It was funded by the United Daughters of the Confederacy (UDC) and was dedicated April 23, 1923, on the grounds of the St. Clair County courthouse in Ashville, Alabama.

The monument includes a larger than life-sized marble statue of a CSA soldier placed on top of a 10-foot-tall stone base. The soldier is standing at rest, holding a rifle, the stock of which is placed on the base by the soldier's foot. The rifle has been replaced at least once. The inscription on the base reads in part, "TO THE HONOR OF ST. CLAIR CO. CONFEDERATE SOLDIERS ERECTED BY THEIR DESCENDANTS, THROUGH ASHVILLE CHAPTER U.D.C. 1923".

A version of the CSA battle flag is carved on the front.
