= Judge Elisha Robinson House =

- U.S. National Register of Historic Places
- Alabama Register of Landmarks and Heritage
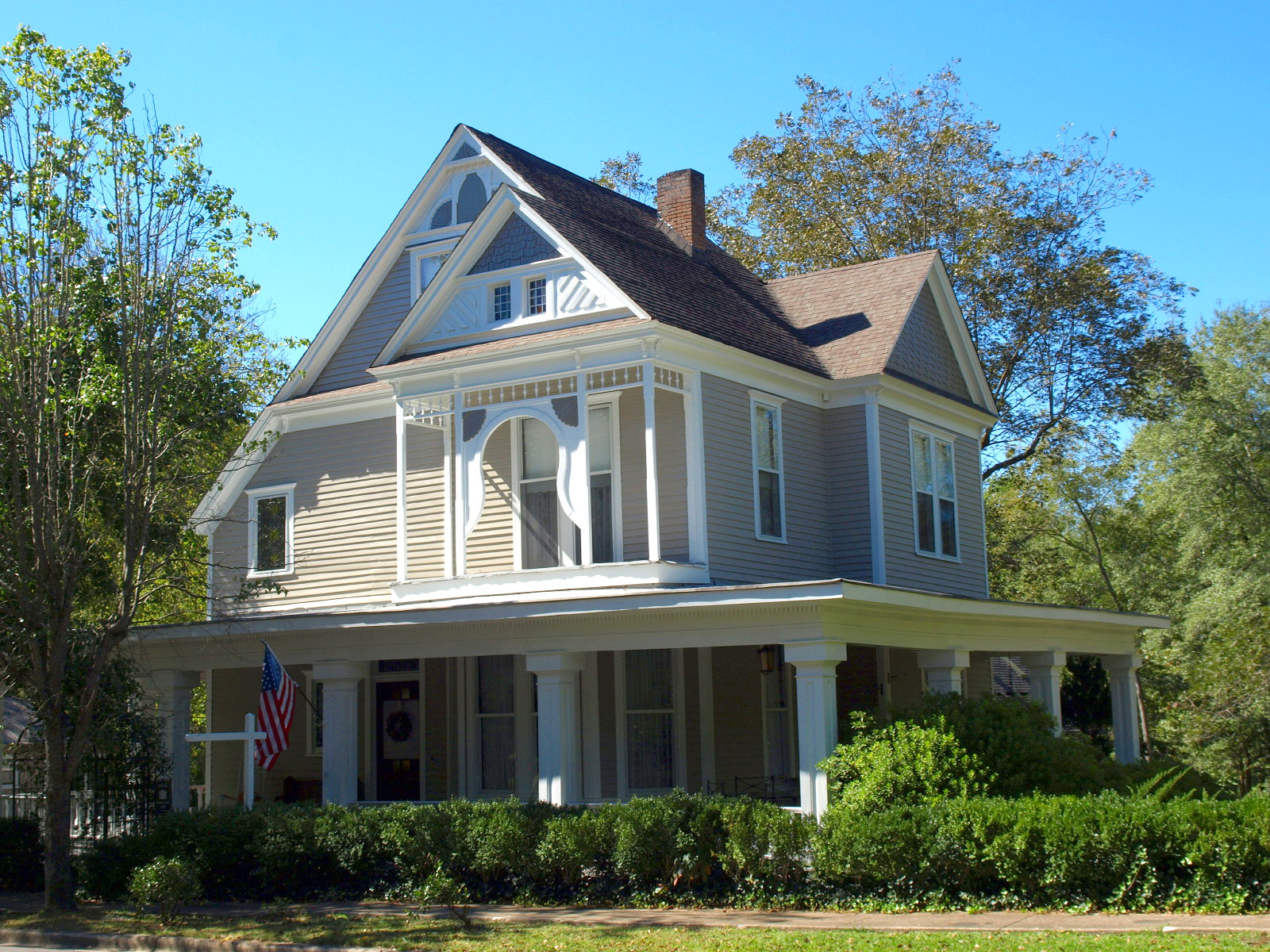

- Location within Alabama
- Location: US 231 s. of jct. with AL 23, Ashville, Alabama
- Coordinates: 33°50′05″N 86°15′19″W
- Area: 11 acres (4.5 ha)
- Built: c.1890
- Architectural style: Queen Anne
- NRHP reference No.: 91000595

Significant dates
- Added to NRHP: May 13, 1991
- Designated ARLH: November 4, 1987

The Judge Elisha Robinson House, in Ashville, Alabama, is a Queen Anne-style house built around 1890. It was listed on the National Register of Historic Places in 1991.

It is located on U.S. Route 231 south of its junction with Alabama State Route 23.

It is a two-story house upon a brick pier foundation.
