= John Ash (American politician) =

American politician (1783–1872)

Personal details
- Born: November 30, 1783 Athens, Georgia, U.S.
- Died: April 1, 1872 (aged 88) Odenville, Alabama, U.S.
- Spouse: Margaret McCurdy "Peggy" Newton (m. 1813–1855; he death)

John T. Ash (November 30, 1783 – April 1, 1872) was an American farmer-turned-politician. He served in the Alabama State Senate in the first half of the 19th century.

== Early life ==
Ash was born in 1783 in Athens, Georgia, to William Ash and Jane Fleming, the first of their seven known children.

== Career ==
Ash became a successful farmer, and served as a judge and member of the first Alabama State Senate. In 1821, Ash was one of five local leaders appointed to oversee the construction of a county courthouse and jail; the county seat was later named Ashville in his honor. Ash built a one-story dogtrot log house around 1820.

== Personal life ==
Ash married Margaret McCurdy "Peggy" Newton in 1813. They had at least fifteen children between 1814 and 1839. In 1817, he became the first white settler of what was then named St. Clairsville, Alabama, in 1817. Around this time, Ash's three-year-old daughter Betsy Ann died after falling from the wagon on which he was riding with his wife and her father, the Reverend Thomas Newton. St. Clairsville was later re-named Ashville in Ash's honor when it was incorporated in 1822.

In 1820, he built a home, now known as the John Ash House, in Ashville. It was listed on the National Register of Historic Places in 1991 and is now the oldest extant house in St. Clair County.

== Death ==
Ash died in 1872, aged 88. He had survived his wife by seventeen years and was interred alongside her in Liberty Cemetery in Odenville, Alabama.
