= Presley Store =

- U.S. National Register of Historic Places
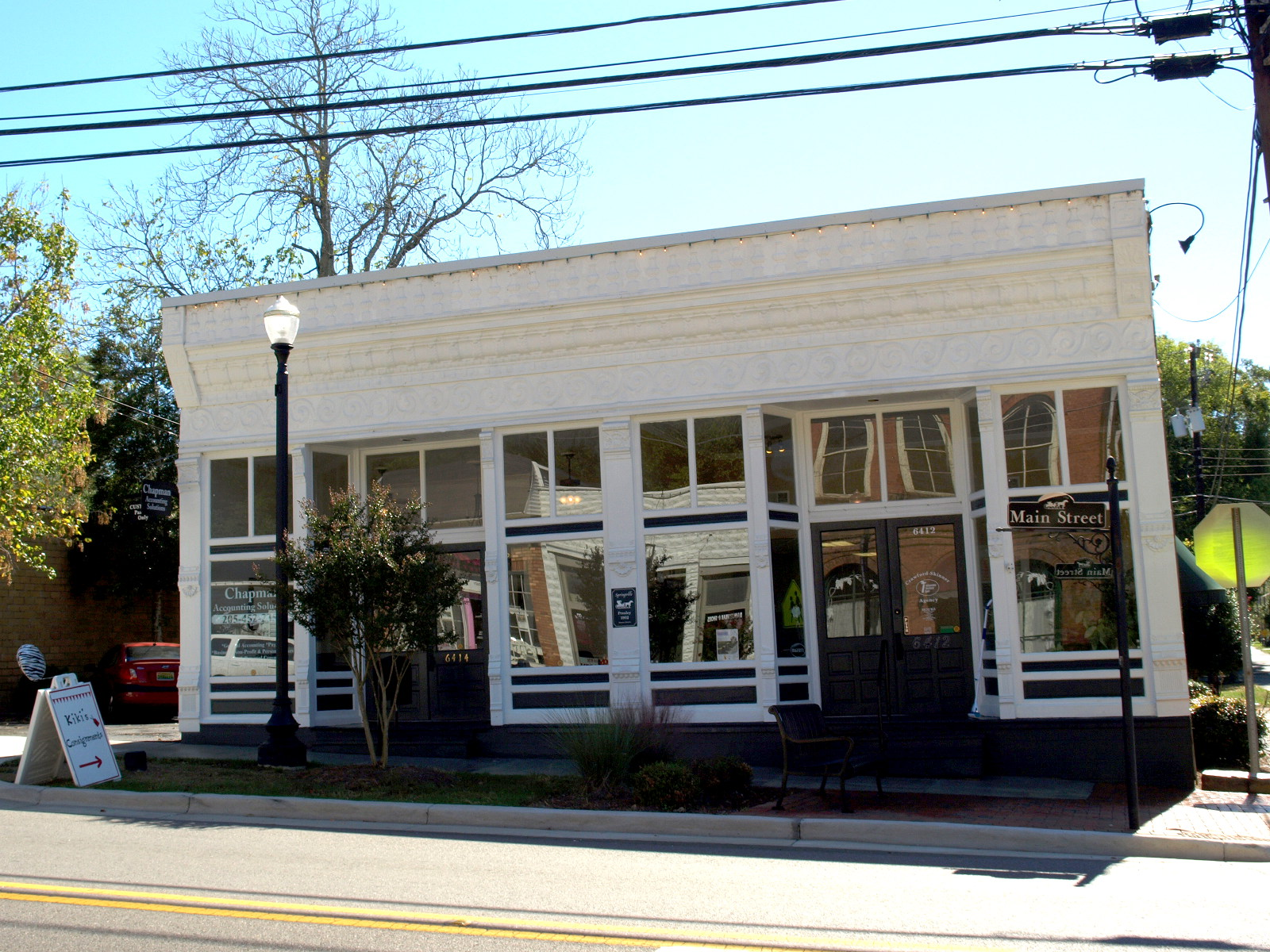
- The store in October 2014

- Location within Alabama Location within the United States
- Location: 601 Main St., Springville, Alabama
- Coordinates: 33°46′29″N 86°28′17″W
- Built: 1902
- NRHP reference No.: 83002982
- Added to NRHP: January 11, 1983

Presley Store (also known as the Webby Building) is a historic building in Springville, Alabama. It was built in 1902 for the general store of brothers Porter and John Presley. The one-story frame building has board-and-batten siding on the sides and rear. The cast iron storefront has two recessed entrances and a tall and ornate pressed metal cornice. At the time, it was one of the most elaborate commercial buildings in the small town. The interior was originally one large space with a storeroom behind, but has since been divided into two spaces.

The store was listed on the National Register of Historic Places in 1983.
