= Shelby Hotel =

Historic Hotel in Alabama

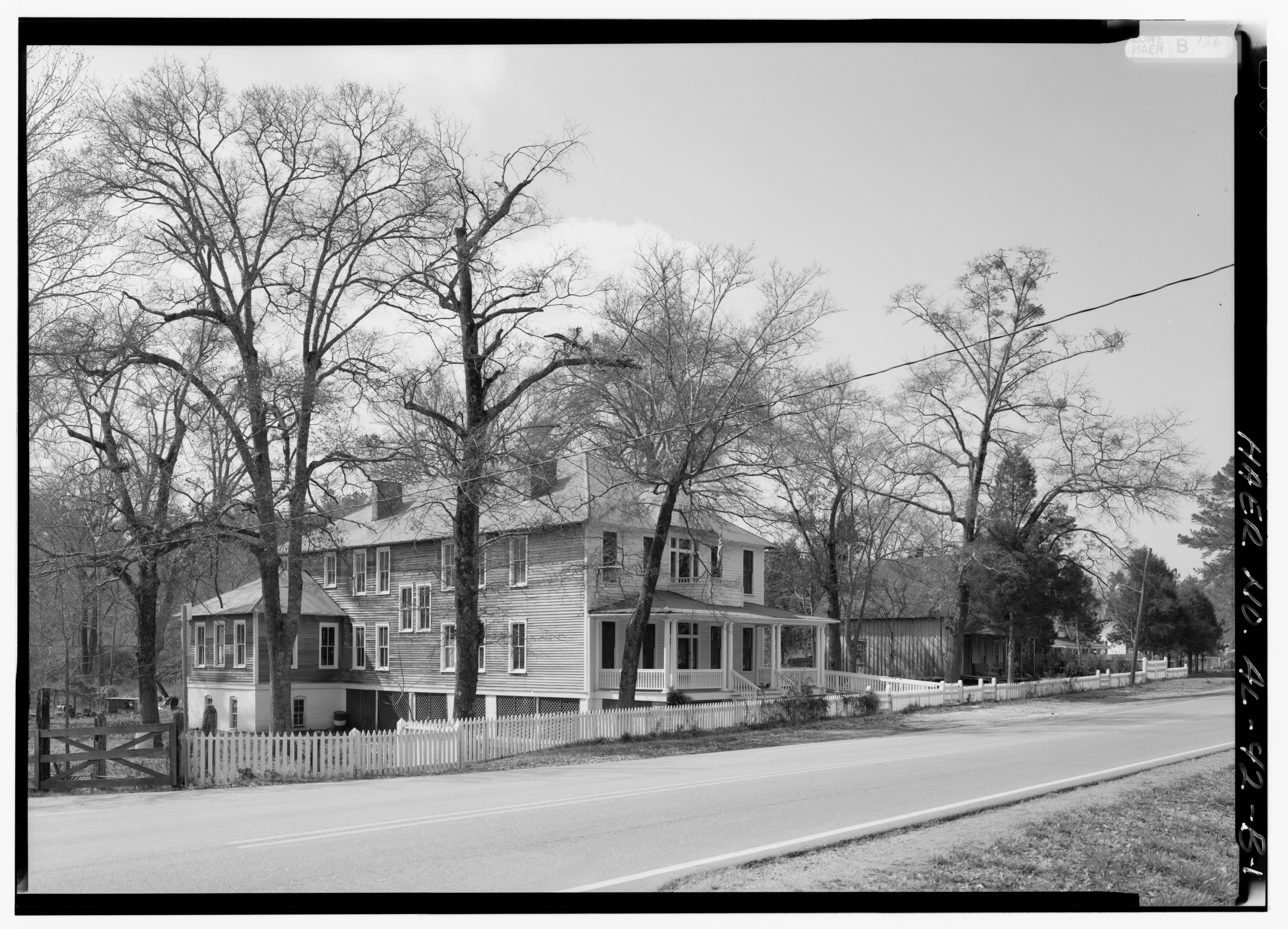
- Shelby Hotel in 1993
- Interactive map of the Shelby Hotel area

General information
- Status: Destroyed (Fire, 2019)
- Location: Shelby, Alabama, United States
- Coordinates: 33°6′46″N 86°35′46″W
- Opened: 1863
- Destroyed: 2019

Technical details
- Floor count: 2

Other information
- Number of rooms: 15 (45 until 1923)

Alabama Register of Landmarks and Heritage
- Official name: Old Shelby Hotel
- Designated: September 14, 1977

The Old Shelby Hotel was built in 1863 in Shelby, Alabama. The building was originally named the Dannemora Hotel and served as a popular tourist spot in the Southeast for many years. The building was built near the Shelby Iron Works and served as spot for Confederate Soldiers to stay during the American Civil War. The hotel was located near a natural spring that caused many tourists to be attracted to the spot, making it a thriving hotel in the southern United States.

The Shelby Hotel was the first hotel in the state of Alabama to have electricity and internal plumbing. The hotel used the advantage of being near a prominent iron works by tapping into the works' water source. The foundry was destroyed by the Union Army in 1865, but the hotel remained, and continued to serve the iron workers after the foundry was rebuilt.

The town of Shelby grew as the United States approached the turn of the century, so the hotel was forced to accommodate this growth. Soon, the 2-story small hotel became much larger, having fifteen bedrooms, offices, a kitchen, two bathrooms equipped with internal plumbing, a dining hall, as well as an additional rear addition that added on thirty more rooms. The extra addition was mostly used by the iron workers from the foundry next door and was considered to be "one of the best-kept places of the kind in the state" The rear wing costed around $10,000, which is the equivalence of $176,171.34 today. The wing was destroyed in 1923 after the iron works foundry closed down.

At its peak, hotel rooms within the hotel cost around $25 a day (approximately $400 in 2021), and this included 3 meals. By 1925, the hotel rooms included beds, bathrooms with sinks and dressers. There was no central heating at the time, so the hotel often remained cold due to the only heating element in the hotel being fireplaces.

The hotel operated from 1863 to 1976, serving guests such as Al Capone and Teddy Roosevelt during its 113-year tenure. Mr. Bernard Rummel and his wife purchased the hotel in 1956 and ran it until its closing. Mr. Rummel recalled that when President Roosevelt visited, he did not arrive by car or carriage, but was seen walking down the road, arriving on foot

The hotel was registered in the Alabama Historic Landmark database and remained vacant from 1976 until its destruction by fire in 2019. During the time of its vacancy, it was an attraction to history buffs, paranormal investigators and urban explorers.

== Fires ==
=== 1898 Fire ===
In 1898, a small fire erupted in a room in the east wing of the hotel and quickly began to spread across the hotel. It was quickly discovered, and with a combined effort, most of the furniture within the hotel was saved. The fire began to spread to neighboring homes as well as the local post office, but was eventually put out with the help of hydrants connected to the foundries water system. The hotel was completely burnt to the ground.

There was not much hesitation to rebuild though, as a new hotel was constructed and was operational in mid February 1900.

=== 1912 Fire ===
February 8, 1912, nearly brought the hotel to another fiery end. That evening, a fire was discovered on the roof of the hotel, and quickly began to engulf the structure. The fire nearly caused unfixable structural damage to the hotel. The fire had an unknown origin, but was quickly put out by the fireman who worked for the nearby Shelby Iron Works, who diligently worked from the roof of the hotel, battling the flames.

=== 2019 Arson ===
On May 26, 2019, the Shelby Hotel was set fire by unknown persons. The Shelby County Fire Department and surrounding city firemen did their best to battle the flames, but the structure was deemed a "total loss" by the Shelby Volunteer Fire District.

== Prominent Guests ==
- Two Alabama Governors
- Theodore Roosevelt - 26th President of the United States
- Woodrow Wilson - 28th President of the United States
- Al Capone - Prominent American Gangster and Businessman
