= Arkwright, Alabama =

- Unincorporated community
- Location within Alabama Location within the United States
- Coordinates: 33°22′17″N 86°24′09″W
- Country: United States
- State: Alabama
- County: Shelby
- Elevation: 459 ft (140 m)
- Time zone: UTC-6 (Central (CST))
  - Summer (DST): UTC-5 (CDT)
- Area codes: 205, 659
- GNIS feature ID: 156003

Alabama Register of Landmarks and Heritage
- Official name: Arkwright Heritage Area
- Designated: August 25, 2011

Arkwright was an unincorporated community in Shelby County, Alabama, United States. The community lies near the banks of the Coosa River and is now within the city limits of Vincent. Arkwright was founded in 1907 and was named for Preston Stanley Arkwright, who served as founder and president of Georgia Railway and Power Company and as an official with the Atlanta, Birmingham and Atlantic Railway. At one point, the community was home to a railroad station, post office, bank, cotton gin, gristmill, general store, furniture store, and school. The post office was in operation from 1909 to 1926. In 1924, the railroad company raised the railroad bed, eliminating the need for a depot. The population soon began to decline and the post office was closed shortly afterwards. The Arkwright Baptist Church and Arkwright Heritage Area, which includes multiple structures and cemeteries, were added to the Alabama Register of Landmarks and Heritage in 2011.

== Demographics ==
According to the returns from 1850-2010 for Alabama, it has never reported a population figure separately on the U.S. Census. It has since been annexed into the adjacent city of Vincent.
