= Springville Historic District (Springville, Alabama) =

Historic district in Alabama, United States

- U.S. National Register of Historic Places
- U.S. Historic district
- Alabama Register of Landmarks and Heritage
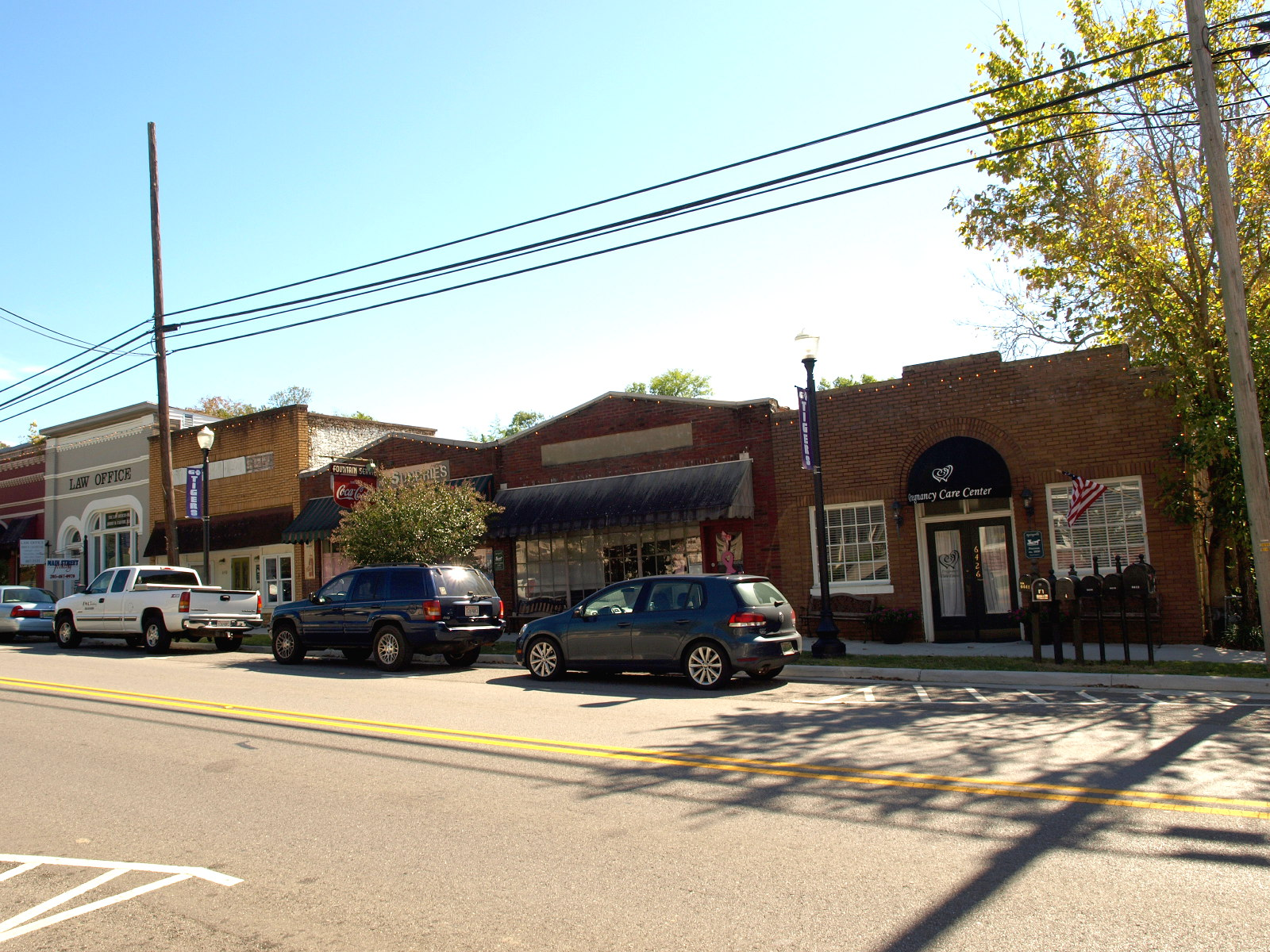
- Buildings on Main Street in October 2014

- Location within Alabama Location within the United States
- Location: Roughly bounded by Academy, Wilson, and Cross Sts., the Norfork-Southern RR tracks, Industrial Dr., and Sarusce St., Springville, Alabama
- Area: 250 acres (100 ha)
- Built: 1881
- Architectural style: Late Victorian, Queen Anne, Early Commercial
- NRHP reference No.: 97000653

Significant dates
- Added to NRHP: July 3, 1997
- Designated ARLH: March 8, 1994

The Springville Historic District is a historic district in Springville, Alabama. The area around the "Big Spring" remained sparsely populated from 1814, when the land was ceded to the United States by the Creek Nation, until after the Civil War. A post office was established in 1834, and a sawmill was founded in 1861, but development did not begin in earnest until the coming of the Alabama and Chattanooga Railroad in 1870. Now connected to Atlanta and Columbus, Mississippi, business and industry began to center in Springville, and the town was a center for moving ore from the surrounding hills to industrial centers in Birmingham and Tuscaloosa.

The town was incorporated in 1881, and it is from this period that the district's oldest buildings date. Several high-style Victorian houses, including some Queen Anne, are spread throughout the town, including the town's first school. Many commercial buildings from this time were destroyed in a fire in 1897. The commercial core was rebuilt and expanded over the next few decades, mostly in simple brick styles, but some (including the Presley Store built in 1902) with more elaborate details. Later houses were mostly bungalows and cottages with Victorian elements, although some Craftsman houses were built as well. In addition, several churches, a cotton mill, and a Masonic temple are still in existence.

The district was listed on the National Register of Historic Places in 1997.
