= John Ash House =

- U.S. National Register of Historic Places
- Alabama Register of Landmarks and Heritage
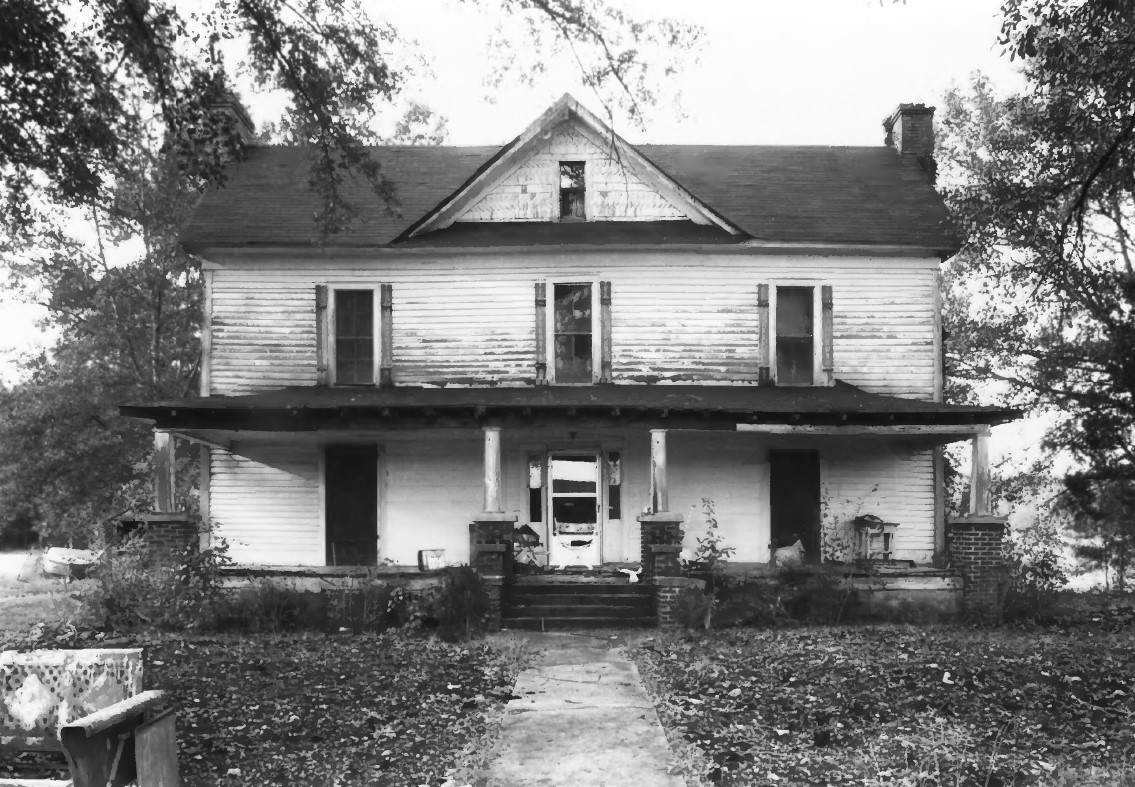
- John Ash House in 1991

- Location within Alabama Location within the United States
- Nearest city: Ashville, Alabama
- Coordinates: 33°46′16″N 86°18′9″W
- Area: less than one acre
- Built: 1820
- NRHP reference No.: 91001479

Significant dates
- Added to NRHP: October 1, 1991
- Designated ARLH: November 2, 1990

The John Ash House, also known as Rowan House, Coker House and Rickles House, is a historic residence near Ashville, Alabama. John Ash emigrated from York County, South Carolina, first to Georgia, later settling in what is today St. Clair County, Alabama in 1817. Ash built a one-story dogtrot log house around 1820. In the 1830s, the house was extensively modified: three rooms and a second story were added to the house, and the exterior was covered with frame siding. The central dogtrot was filled in, and the main portion now resembled an I-house. A triangular pedimented gable adorns the front of the house, and each side has a brick chimney. A porch was added to the front of the house in the early 1900s. The house was listed on the Alabama Register of Landmarks and Heritage in 1990 and the National Register of Historic Places in 1991.
