= Wagarville, Alabama =

- Unincorporated community
- Location of Wagarville in Alabama
- Coordinates: 31°26′11″N 88°1′42″W
- Country: United States
- State: Alabama
- County: Washington

Population (2010)
  - Total: 3,353
- Time zone: UTC-6 (Central (CST))
  - Summer (DST): UTC-5 (CDT)
- ZIP code: 36585
- Area code: 251
- GNIS feature ID: 128492

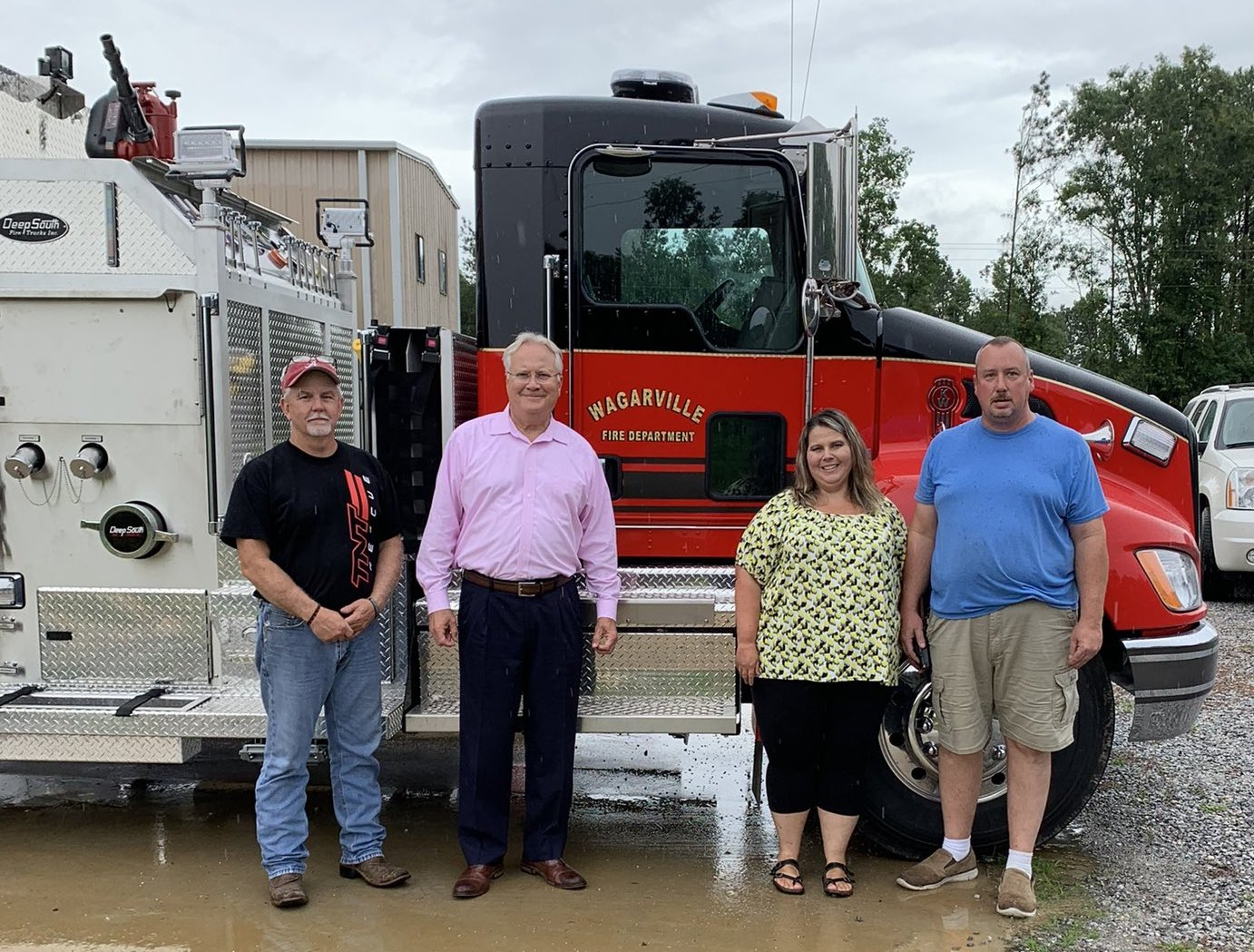
Jerry Carl with constituents in Wagarville in 2021.

Wagarville is an unincorporated community in Washington County, Alabama, United States. As of 2010, the population of the area was 3,353. Wagarville lost its status as a CDP sometime after the 2010 census, as it never appeared on the 2020 census data for Alabama CDPs.
