= Dr. James J. Bothwell House =

- U.S. National Register of Historic Places
- Alabama Register of Landmarks and Heritage
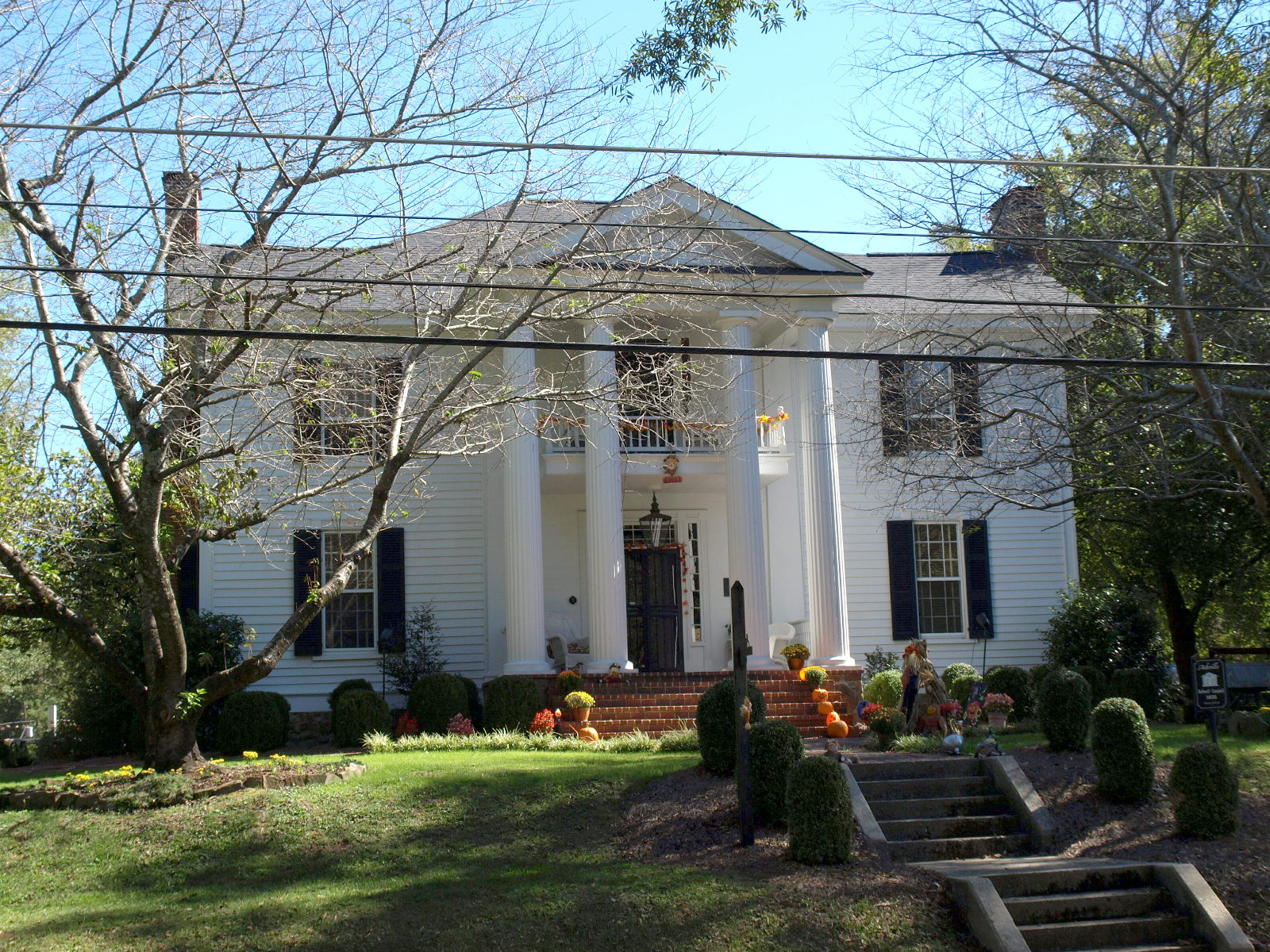
- The house in October 2014

- Location within Alabama Location within the United States
- Location: Hartford Ave., Ashville, Alabama
- Coordinates: 33°50′6″N 86°15′17″W
- Area: 0.8 acres (0.32 ha)
- Built: 1835
- Architectural style: Federal
- NRHP reference No.: 82004612

Significant dates
- Added to NRHP: February 4, 1982
- Designated ARLH: October 19, 1979

The Dr. James J. Bothwell House, also known as Bothwell-Embry House, is a historic residence in Ashville, Alabama. The house was built in 1835 for James Bothwell, the second doctor in Ashville, and also a clerk of the circuit court. It is a two-story Federal-style house, with a two-story pedimented portico supported by four Doric columns. In 1852 a wing was added to the rear of the house for a kitchen and dining room on the ground floor and a bedroom above. Another ground floor bedroom wing was added in 1882. Another bedroom was added above in 1917, and the area between the wings was enclosed. The house was listed on the Alabama Register of Landmarks and Heritage in 1979 and the National Register of Historic Places in 1982. It is to be sold at auction in May 2014.
