= Ashville Historic District (Ashville, Alabama) =

Historic district in Alabama, United States

- U.S. National Register of Historic Places
- U.S. Historic district
- Alabama Register of Landmarks and Heritage
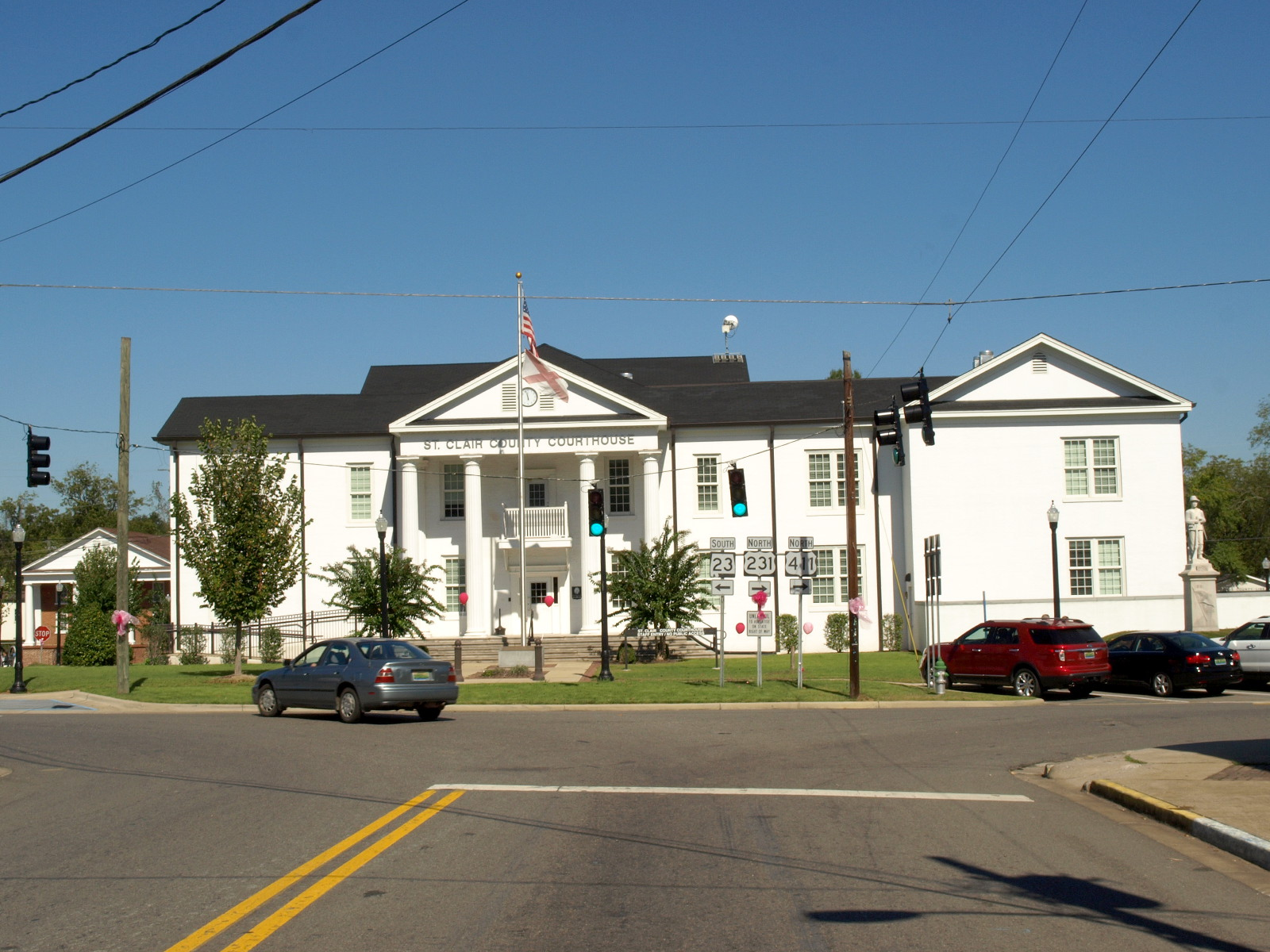
- The St. Clair County Courthouse in October 2014

- Location within Alabama Location within the United States
- Location: Bounded by AL 23, Greensport Rd., 8th Ave., Waldrop Dr., AL 231, and 5th St., Ashville, Alabama
- Coordinates: 33°50′8″N 86°15′12″W
- Area: 350 acres (140 ha)
- Architectural style: Federal, Greek Revival
- NRHP reference No.: 05000288

Significant dates
- Added to NRHP: April 20, 2005
- Designated ARLH: 1973

The Ashville Historic District in Ashville, Alabama is a historic district that was listed on the National Register of Historic Places in 2005. In 2005, it included 122 contributing buildings plus one other contributing site and one other contributing object.
