= Springville, Alabama =

City in Alabama, United States

- City
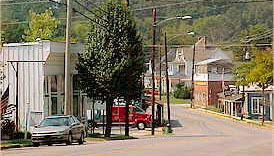
- Downtown Springville

- Location of Springville in St. Clair County, Alabama.
- Coordinates: 33°45′18″N 86°29′31″W
- Country: United States
- State: Alabama
- County: St. Clair
- Established as (Big Springs): c.Mid-1810's
- Renamed to (Pinkhill): c.1833
- Renamed to (Springville): December 1834
- Incorporated: December 1880

Government
  - Type: Mayor-Council
  - Mayor: Dave Thomas (R)

Area
  - Total: 9.66 sq mi (25.01 km^{2})
  - Land: 9.62 sq mi (24.91 km^{2})
  - Water: 0.039 sq mi (0.10 km^{2})
- Elevation: 735 ft (224 m)

Population (2020)
  - Total: 4,786
  - Density: 497.6/sq mi (192.12/km^{2})
- Time zone: UTC-6 (Central (CST))
  - Summer (DST): UTC-5 (CDT)
- ZIP code: 35146
- Area codes: 205, 659
- FIPS code: 01-72600
- GNIS feature ID: 2405516
- Website: https://www.cityofspringville.com/

Springville is a city in St. Clair County, Alabama, United States. It incorporated in December 1880. At the 2020 census the population was 4,786, up from 4,080 in 2010.

== Geography ==
According to the U.S. Census Bureau, the town has a total area of 9.66 square miles (25.0 km^{2}), of which 9.62 square miles (24.9 km^{2}) is land and 0.04 square miles (0.10 km^{2}) (0.31%) is water.

== Demographics ==
Historical population
Census	Pop.	Note	%±
1880	185		—
1900	496		—
1910	350		−29.4%
1920	450		28.6%
1930	437		−2.9%
1940	460		5.3%
1950	553		20.2%
1960	822		48.6%
1970	1,153		40.3%
1980	1,476		28.0%
1990	1,910		29.4%
2000	2,521		32.0%
2010	4,080		61.8%
2020	4,786		17.3%
2025 (est.)	5,597	▲	16.9%
U.S. Decennial Census; 2013 Estimate

=== 2020 census ===
As of the 2020 census, Springville had a population of 4,786. The median age was 42.9 years. 23.8% of residents were under the age of 18 and 19.5% of residents were 65 years of age or older. For every 100 females there were 97.0 males, and for every 100 females age 18 and over there were 92.1 males age 18 and over.

0.0% of residents lived in urban areas, while 100.0% lived in rural areas.

There were 1,809 households in Springville, of which 34.8% had children under the age of 18 living in them. Of all households, 64.7% were married-couple households, 10.7% were households with a male householder and no spouse or partner present, and 21.6% were households with a female householder and no spouse or partner present. About 20.5% of all households were made up of individuals and 11.8% had someone living alone who was 65 years of age or older. There were 1,180 families residing in the city.

There were 1,882 housing units, of which 3.9% were vacant. The homeowner vacancy rate was 0.4% and the rental vacancy rate was 0.0%.

Springville racial composition
Race	Num.	Perc.
White (non-Hispanic)	4,332	90.51%
Black or African American (non-Hispanic)	205	4.28%
Native American	5	0.1%
Asian	19	0.4%
Other/Mixed	149	3.11%
Hispanic or Latino	76	1.59%

=== 2010 census ===
At the 2010 census there were 4,080 people, 1,561 households, and 1,223 families living in the town. The population density was 637.5 inhabitants per square mile (246.1/km^{2}). There were 1,652 housing units at an average density of 258.1 per square mile (99.7/km^{2}). The racial makeup of the town was 93.6% White, 4.7% Black or African American, 0.3% Native American, 0.4% Asian, 0.1% Pacific Islander, and .9% from two or more races. 0.7% of the population were Hispanic or Latino of any race. Of the 1,561 households 31.5% had children under the age of 18 living with them, 66.0% were married couples living together, 9.5% had a female householder with no husband present, and 21.7% were non-families. 19.3% of households were one person and 8.1% were one person aged 65 or older. The average household size was 2.61 and the average family size was 2.98.

The age distribution was 23.8% under the age of 18, 6.7% from 18 to 24, 22.9% from 25 to 44, 32.3% from 45 to 64, and 14.3% 65 or older. The median age was 42.6 years. For every 100 females, there were 95.3 males. For every 100 females aged 18 and over, there were 95.7 males.

The median household income was $66,667 and the median family income was $75,679. Males had a median income of $60,893 versus $31,782 for females. The per capita income for the town was $27,526. About 7.9% of families and 9.2% of the population were below the poverty line, including 11.6% of those under age 18 and 9.9% of those age 65 or over.

=== 2000 census ===
At the 2000 census there were 2,521 people, 990 households, and 767 families living in the town. The population density was 393.8 inhabitants per square mile (152.0/km^{2}). There were 1,049 housing units at an average density of 163.8 per square mile (63.2/km^{2}). The racial makeup of the town was 90.56% White, 7.74% Black or African American, 0.16% Native American, 0.28% Asian, 0.16% Pacific Islander, and 1.11% from two or more races. 0.24% of the population were Hispanic or Latino of any race. Of the 990 households 34.4% had children under the age of 18 living with them, 62.8% were married couples living together, 11.5% had a female householder with no husband present, and 22.5% were non-families. 20.5% of households were one person and 8.3% were one person aged 65 or older. The average household size was 2.55 and the average family size was 2.93.

The age distribution was 24.9% under the age of 18, 6.9% from 18 to 24, 30.1% from 25 to 44, 26.2% from 45 to 64, and 11.9% 65 or older. The median age was 38 years. For every 100 females, there were 97.4 males. For every 100 females aged 18 and over, there were 88.5 males.

The median household income was $43,397 and the median family income was $53,859. Males had a median income of $35,977 versus $25,542 for females. The per capita income for the town was $20,518. About 8.0% of families and 10.8% of the population were below the poverty line, including 11.1% of those under age 45–55 and 23.4% of those age 65 or over.

== Movies ==
Although a small Alabama town, Springville has been the site of filming for two movies:

- 1987 – a gangster film called The Verne Miller Story (released on video entitled Gangland) starring Scott Glenn
- 2001 – Rustin (starring Meat Loaf and Zachary Ty Bryan)

== Notable people ==
- Howard Cruse, alternative cartoonist
- Casey Mize, MLB pitcher.
- Hank Patterson, who played Mr. Fred Ziffel, on Green Acres.
- Trinity the Tuck (Ryan Taylor), an American drag queen and recording artist
- Aubrey Willis Williams, head of the National Youth Administration during the New Deal.
- Artie Wilson, former Major League Baseball player.
