= Ashville, Alabama =

City in and county seat of St. Clair County, Alabama

- City
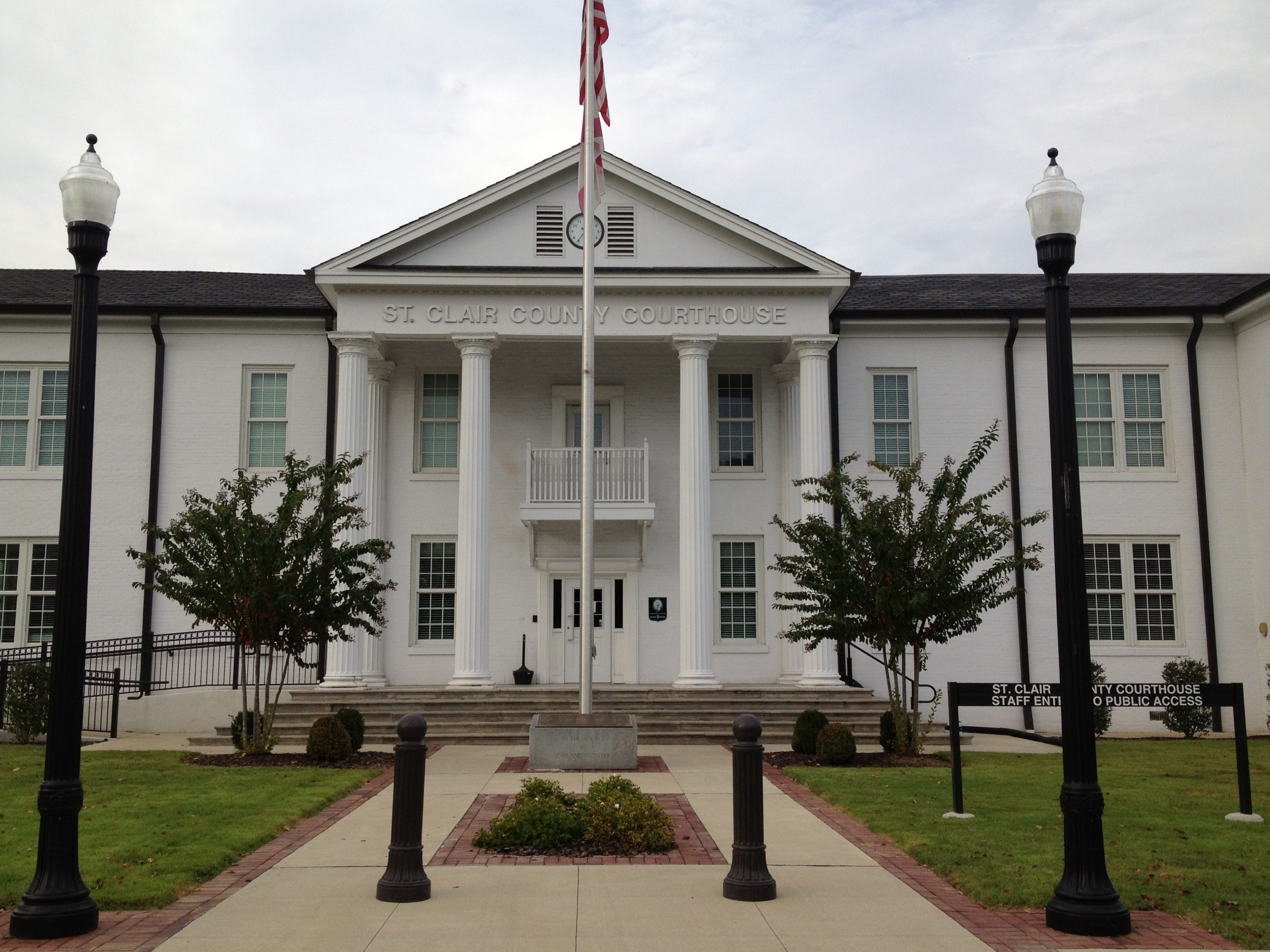
- St. Clair County Courthouse in Ashville

- Flag Seal

- Location of Ashville in St. Clair County, Alabama.
- Coordinates: 33°50′37″N 86°15′59″W
- Country: United States
- State: Alabama
- County: St. Clair

Government
  - Mayor: Derrick Mostella

Area
  - Total: 19.40 sq mi (50.25 km^{2})
  - Land: 19.21 sq mi (49.76 km^{2})
  - Water: 0.19 sq mi (0.49 km^{2})
- Elevation: 577 ft (176 m)

Population (2020)
  - Total: 2,346
  - Density: 122.1/sq mi (47.14/km^{2})
- Time zone: UTC-6 (Central (CST))
  - Summer (DST): UTC-5 (CDT)
- ZIP code: 35953
- Area codes: 205, 659
- FIPS code: 01-02908
- GNIS feature ID: 2403122
- Website: www.cityofashville.org

Ashville is a city in and one of the county seats of St. Clair County, Alabama, United States, other seat being Pell City. As of the 2020 census, Ashville had a population of 2,346. It incorporated in 1822.

== History ==
Ashville was initially founded as the community of St. Clairsville, but the name was changed to honor John Ash, the first white settler of the area who arrived in 1817. He became the first county judge and later state senator. His log cabin stands in the city center. Philip Coleman originally owned the land on which the town stands, but he sold 30 acres to the five county commissioners, which included Ash, who was appointed by Gov. Thomas Bibb to establish a new county seat for St. Clair. It was designated the county seat in 1821 and the village incorporated in 1822. The first courthouse, also a log structure, was built two years later. It was replaced in 1844 with the current courthouse building.

In 1890, a group of investors organized the Tennessee River, Ashville and Coosa Railroad Company, and planned to build a railroad line from Sheffield to Anniston via Ashville. It managed to build to Ashville from Whitney, connecting the town to the Alabama Great Southern Railroad. However, it went bankrupt during the mid-1890s, and the tracks were dismantled and sold for scrap.

Electric lights came to Ashville in 1891, and the first telephone company was chartered in the same year. Residents in the southern half of the county often complained of the difficulty of traveling to Ashville over Backbone Mountain, which divides the county, so the state legislature authorized a satellite county seat to be established in Pell City in 1907 on the southern side of the mountain.

== Geography ==
According to the United States Census Bureau, the town had a total area of 19.4 square miles (50 km^{2}), of which 19.3 square miles (50 km^{2}) is land and 0.1 square mile (0.26 km^{2}) (0.46%) is water.

=== Climate ===
The climate in this area is characterized by hot, humid summers and generally mild to cool winters. According to the Köppen climate classification system, Ashville has a humid subtropical climate, abbreviated "Cfa" on climate maps.

Climate data for Ashville, Alabama
Month	Jan	Feb	Mar	Apr	May	Jun	Jul	Aug	Sep	Oct	Nov	Dec	Year
Mean daily maximum °C (°F)	13 (55)	13 (55)	19 (66)	23 (73)	28 (83)	32 (89)	32 (90)	32 (90)	30 (86)	24 (76)	18 (64)	12 (53)	23 (73)
Mean daily minimum °C (°F)	1 (33)	1 (33)	6 (43)	9 (48)	13 (56)	18 (65)	20 (68)	19 (67)	16 (60)	9 (49)	3 (38)	1 (33)	9 (49)
Average precipitation mm (inches)	130 (5.3)	140 (5.4)	160 (6.4)	120 (4.6)	91 (3.6)	94 (3.7)	130 (5)	99 (3.9)	91 (3.6)	66 (2.6)	86 (3.4)	130 (5.1)	1,330 (52.5)
Source: Weatherbase

== Demographics ==
=== Ashville ===
Historical population
Census	Pop.	Note	%±
1860	117		—
1900	362		—
1910	278		−23.2%
1920	349		25.5%
1930	369		5.7%
1940	385		4.3%
1950	494		28.3%
1960	973		97.0%
1970	986		1.3%
1980	1,489		51.0%
1990	1,494		0.3%
2000	2,260		51.3%
2010	2,212		−2.1%
2020	2,346		6.1%
U.S. Decennial Census; 2013 Estimate

Ashville first appeared on the 1860 U.S. Census as an incorporated town. It would not appear again on the census as a town until 1900. See also precinct below.

=== Racial and ethnic composition ===
Ashville city, Alabama – Racial and ethnic composition Note: the US Census treats Hispanic/Latino as an ethnic category. This table excludes Latinos from the racial categories and assigns them to a separate category. Hispanics/Latinos may be of any race. Race and ethnicity were not surveyed for populations under 2,500 in 1980 and under 1,000 in 1990.
Race / Ethnicity (NH = Non-Hispanic)	Pop 1990	Pop 2000	Pop 2010	Pop 2020	% 1990	% 2000	% 2010	% 2020
White alone (NH)	1,062	1,550	1,632	1,654	71.08%	68.58%	73.78%	70.50%
Black or African American alone (NH)	427	599	446	405	28.58%	26.50%	20.16%	17.26%
Native American or Alaska Native alone (NH)	0	4	4	20	0.00%	0.18%	0.18%	0.85%
Asian alone (NH)	0	4	5	19	0.00%	0.18%	0.23%	0.81%
Native Hawaiian or Pacific Islander alone (NH)	x	7	0	4	x	0.31%	0.00%	0.17%
Other race alone (NH)	0	1	1	9	0.00%	0.04%	0.05%	0.38%
Mixed race or Multiracial (NH)	x	30	39	111	x	1.33%	1.76%	4.73%
Hispanic or Latino (any race)	5	65	85	124	0.33%	2.88%	3.84%	5.29%
Total	1,494	2,260	2,212	2,346	100.00%	100.00%	100.00%	100.00%

=== 2020 census ===
As of the 2020 census, Ashville had a population of 2,346. The median age was 40.8 years. 22.7% of residents were under the age of 18 and 18.9% of residents were 65 years of age or older. For every 100 females there were 101.2 males, and for every 100 females age 18 and over there were 96.2 males age 18 and over.

0.0% of residents lived in urban areas, while 100.0% lived in rural areas.

There were 845 households and 584 families in Ashville; 33.5% had children under the age of 18 living in them. Of all households, 46.4% were married-couple households, 18.2% were households with a male householder and no spouse or partner present, and 31.1% were households with a female householder and no spouse or partner present. About 25.8% of all households were made up of individuals and 11.9% had someone living alone who was 65 years of age or older.

There were 950 housing units, of which 11.1% were vacant. The homeowner vacancy rate was 1.1% and the rental vacancy rate was 9.7%.

=== 2010 census ===
As of the census of 2010, there were 2,212 people, 793 households, and 597 families residing in the town. The population density was 114.6 inhabitants per square mile (44.2/km^{2}). There were 888 housing units at an average density of 46.0 per square mile (17.8/km^{2}). The racial makeup of the town was 75.8% White, 20.3% Black or African American, 0.2% Native American, 03% Asian, 0% Pacific Islander, 1.4% from other races, and 2.0% from two or more races. 3.8% of the population were Hispanic or Latino of any race.

There were 793 households, out of which 29.6% had children under the age of 18 living with them, 54.9% were married couples living together, 16.6% had a female householder with no husband present, and 24.7% were non-families. 21.8% of all households were made up of individuals, and 9.0% had someone living alone who was 65 years of age or older. The average household size was 2.68 and the average family size was 3.12.

In the town the population was spread out, with 24.0% under the age of 18, 10.0% from 18 to 24, 25.9% from 25 to 44, 26.9% from 45 to 64, and 13.3% who were 65 years of age or older. The median age was 37.3 years. For every 100 females, there were 99.6 males. For every 100 females age 18 and over, there were 100.3 males.

The median income for a household in the town was $33,321, and the median income for a family was $34,607. Males had a median income of $32,026 versus $30,033 for females. The per capita income for the town was $16,419. About 14.2% of families and 19.9% of the population were below the poverty line, including 32.0% of those under age 18 and 6.2% of those age 65 or over.

=== 2000 census ===
As of the census of 2000, there were 2,260 people, 814 households, and 608 families residing in the town. The population density was 116.9 inhabitants per square mile (45.1/km^{2}). There were 905 housing units at an average density of 46.8 per square mile (18.1/km^{2}). The racial makeup of the town was 69.42% White, 26.55% Black or African American, 0.18% Native American, 0.18% Asian, 0.31% Pacific Islander, 1.81% from other races, and 1.55% from two or more races. 2.88% of the population were Hispanic or Latino of any race.

There were 814 households, out of which 37.0% had children under the age of 18 living with them, 56.6% were married couples living together, 14.1% had a female householder with no husband present, and 25.2% were non-families. 22.7% of all households were made up of individuals, and 11.2% had someone living alone who was 65 years of age or older. The average household size was 2.64 and the average family size was 3.10.

In the town the population was spread out, with 25.7% under the age of 18, 8.9% from 18 to 24, 28.2% from 25 to 44, 23.2% from 45 to 64, and 14.0% who were 65 years of age or older. The median age was 36 years. For every 100 females, there were 102.3 males. For every 100 females age 18 and over, there were 100.1 males.

The median income for a household in the town was $31,509, and the median income for a family was $38,355. Males had a median income of $31,081 versus $21,914 for females. The per capita income for the town was $15,867. About 11.4% of families and 15.1% of the population were below the poverty line, including 14.1% of those under age 18 and 18.3% of those age 65 or over.

== Ashville Precinct/Division ==
Historical population
Census	Pop.	Note	%±
1870	922		—
1880	1,443		56.5%
1890	2,017		39.8%
1900	2,446		21.3%
1910	2,067		−15.5%
1920	2,289		10.7%
1930	2,379		3.9%
1940	2,494		4.8%
1950	2,423		−2.8%
1960	4,402		81.7%
1970	4,895		11.2%
1980	6,347		29.7%
1990	6,742		6.2%
2000	8,208		21.7%
2010	8,449		2.9%
U.S. Decennial Census

The Ashville Beat (St. Clair County 1st Beat) first appeared on the 1870 U.S. Census. In 1890, "beat" was changed to "precinct." In 1960, the precinct was changed to "census division" as part of a general reorganization of counties.

== April 27, 2011, tornado ==
On the evening of April 27, 2011, an EF-4 tornado ripped through the Shoal Creek Valley community south of Ashville, killing 13 people. The tornado also destroyed hundreds of thousands of dollars' worth of property including homes, livestock, timberland, and farm equipment. Rescuers from neighboring communities immediately responded after the twister swept through the valley; however, due to the abundance of fallen timber blocking the roads and the remoteness of the community, many victims were forced to wait hours before aid could arrive. Following the devastation, then-Governor Robert Bentley visited the community along with officials from the Alabama Emergency Management Agency and the Federal Emergency Management Agency. The community received both federal and state disaster aid for several weeks following the destructive tornado.

== Education ==
- St. Clair County School District
  - Ashville Elementary School
    - Principal: Shane Parker
      - Guidance Counselor: Summer Burke
  - Ashville Middle School
    - Principal: Rusty St. John
      - Assistant Principal: TBA
      - Guidance Counselor: Kerry Montgomery
  - Ashville High School
    - Principal: Janet Johnson
      - Assistant Principal: TBA
      - Guidance Counselor: TBA
    - Mascot: Bulldogs - School Colors: Kelly Green, White, and Orange

== Notable people ==
- Rufus W. Cobb, Governor of Alabama from 1878 to 1882
- John Grass, Ashville High School: c/o 1985, head football coach for Jacksonville State University
- Howard Hill, Hollywood archer, called "The World's Greatest Archer," winning 196 field archery competitions.

== Photo Gallery ==
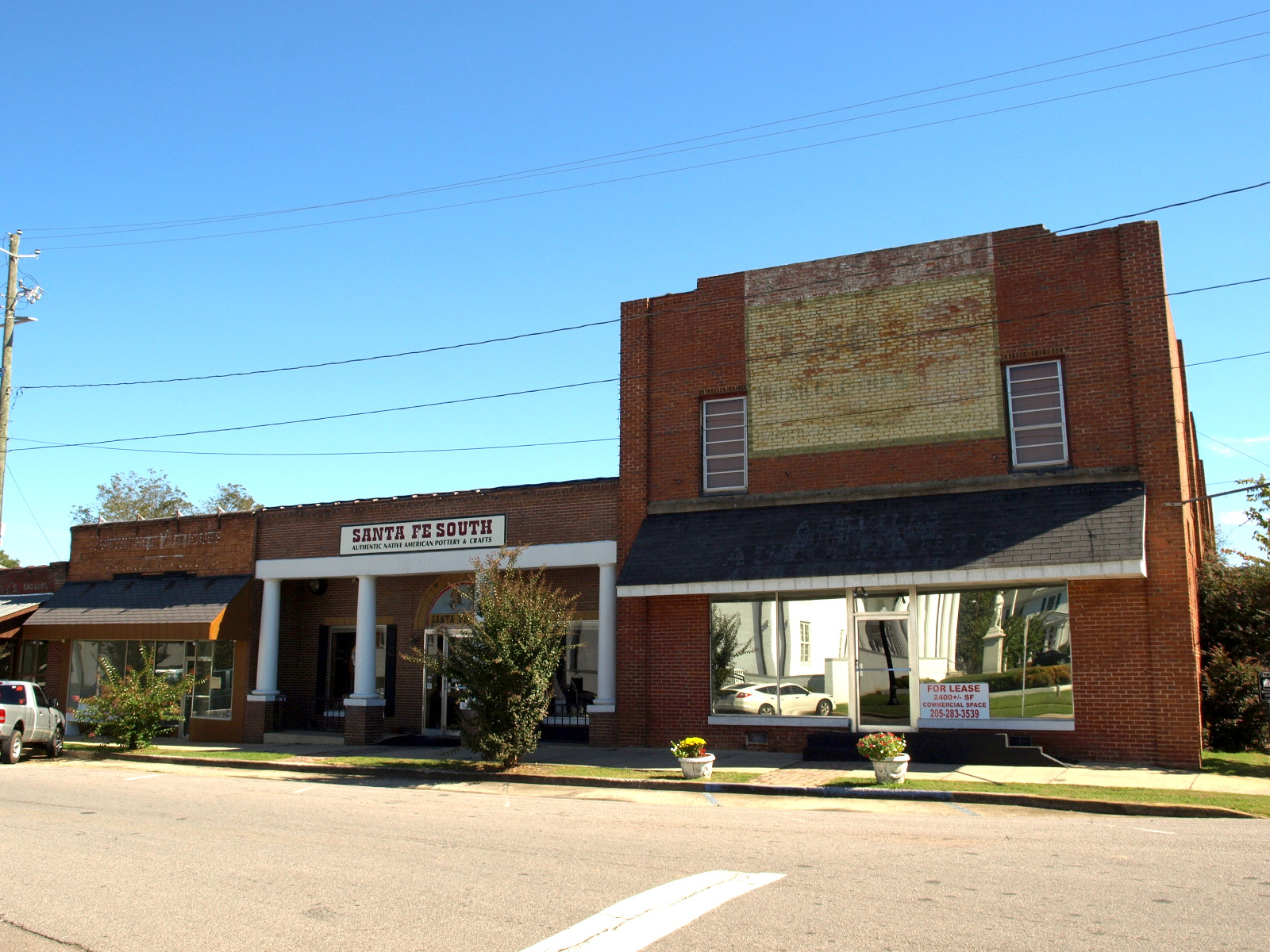
Court Street, Ashville

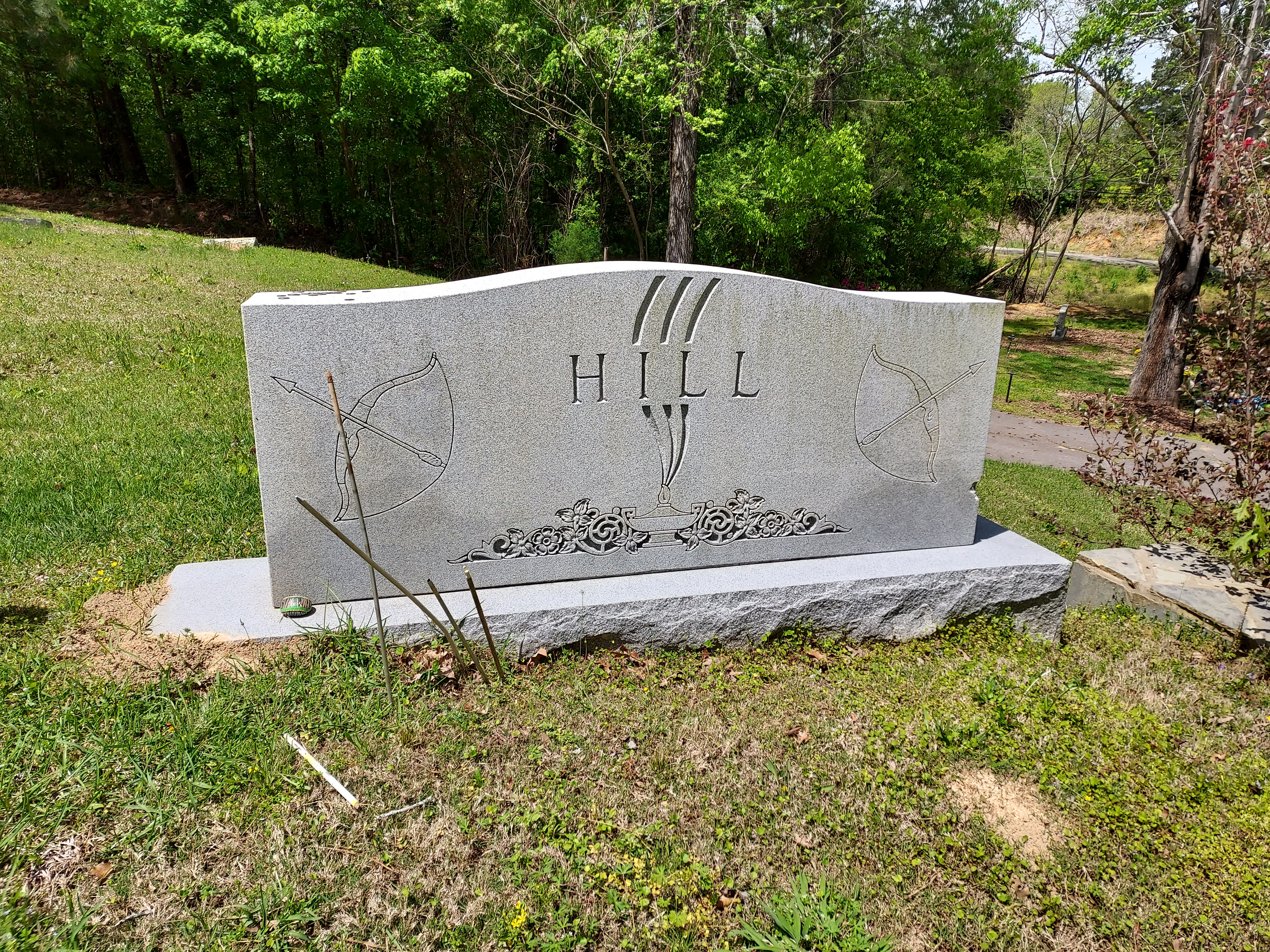
Howard Hill gravesite

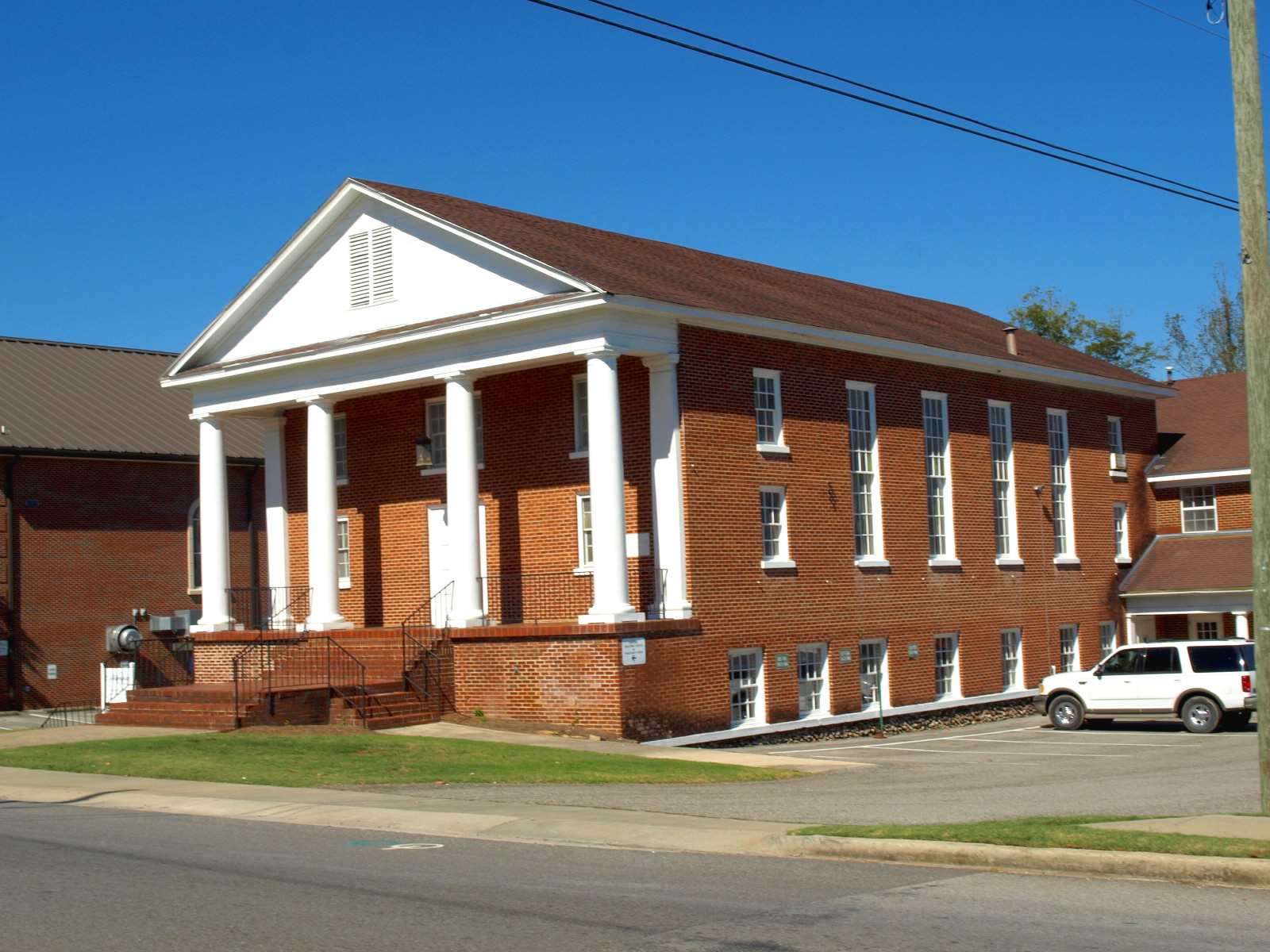
First Baptist Church, Ashville

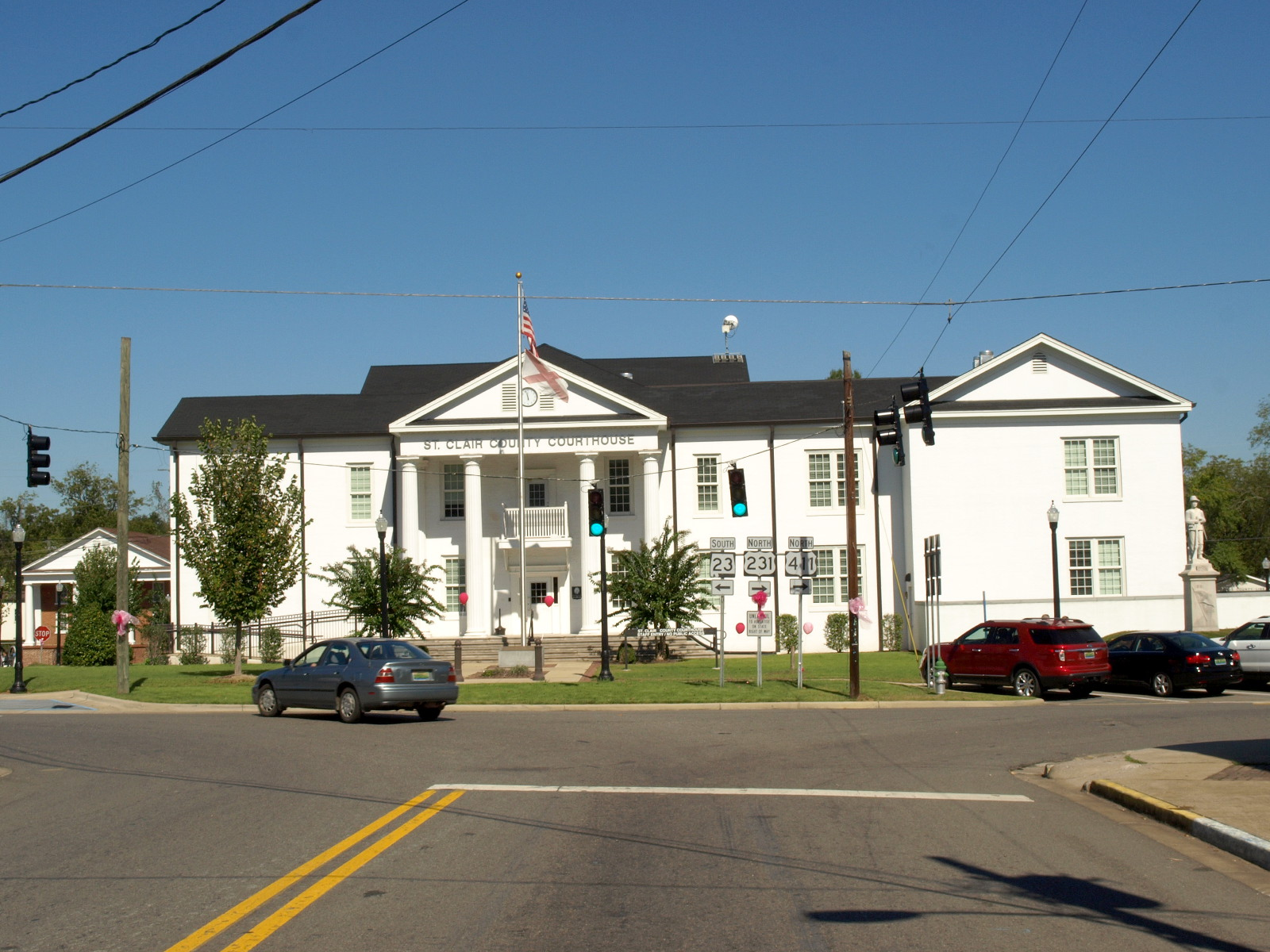
St. Clair County Courthouse, Ashville

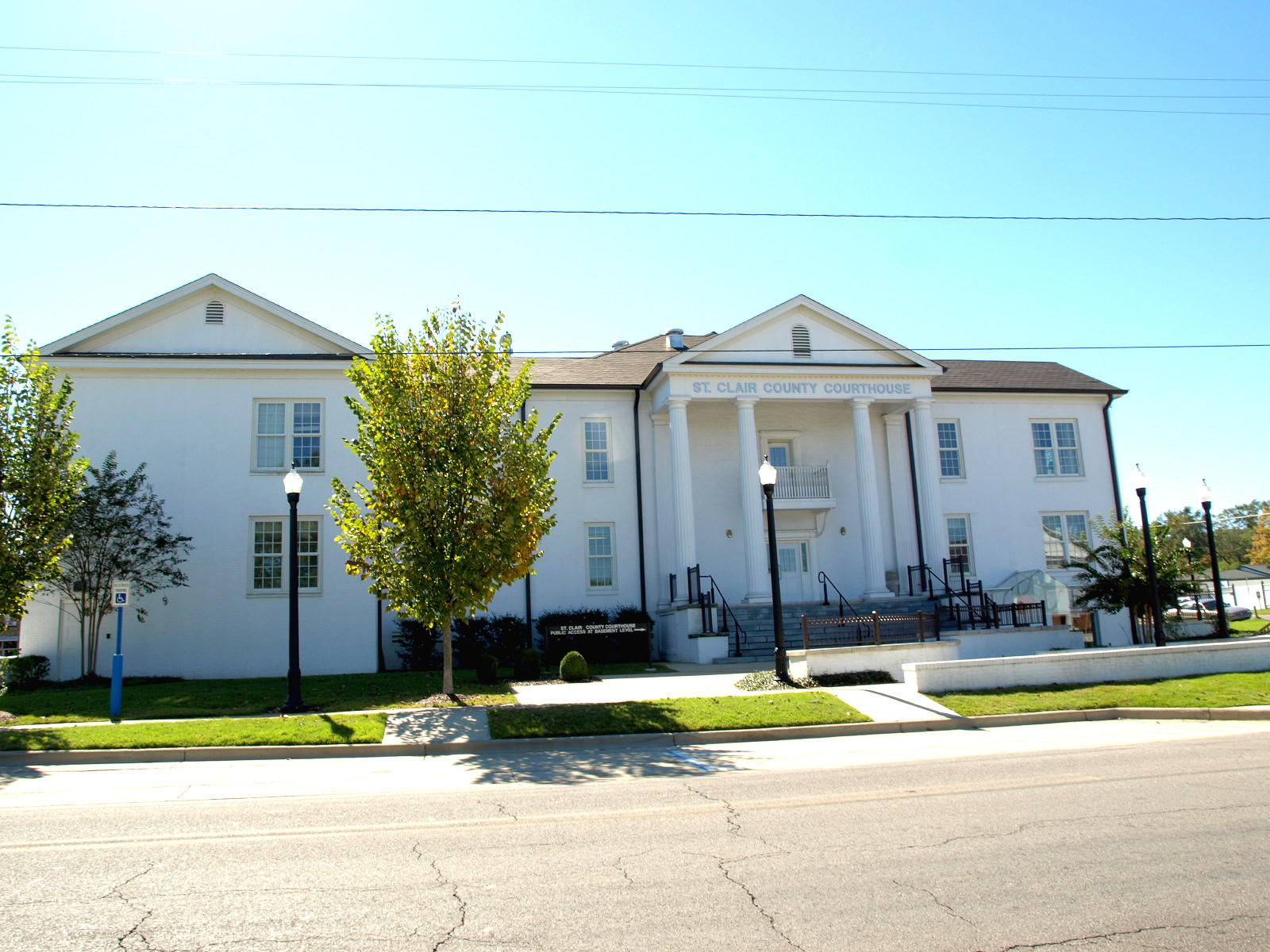
St. Clair County Courthouse, Ashville

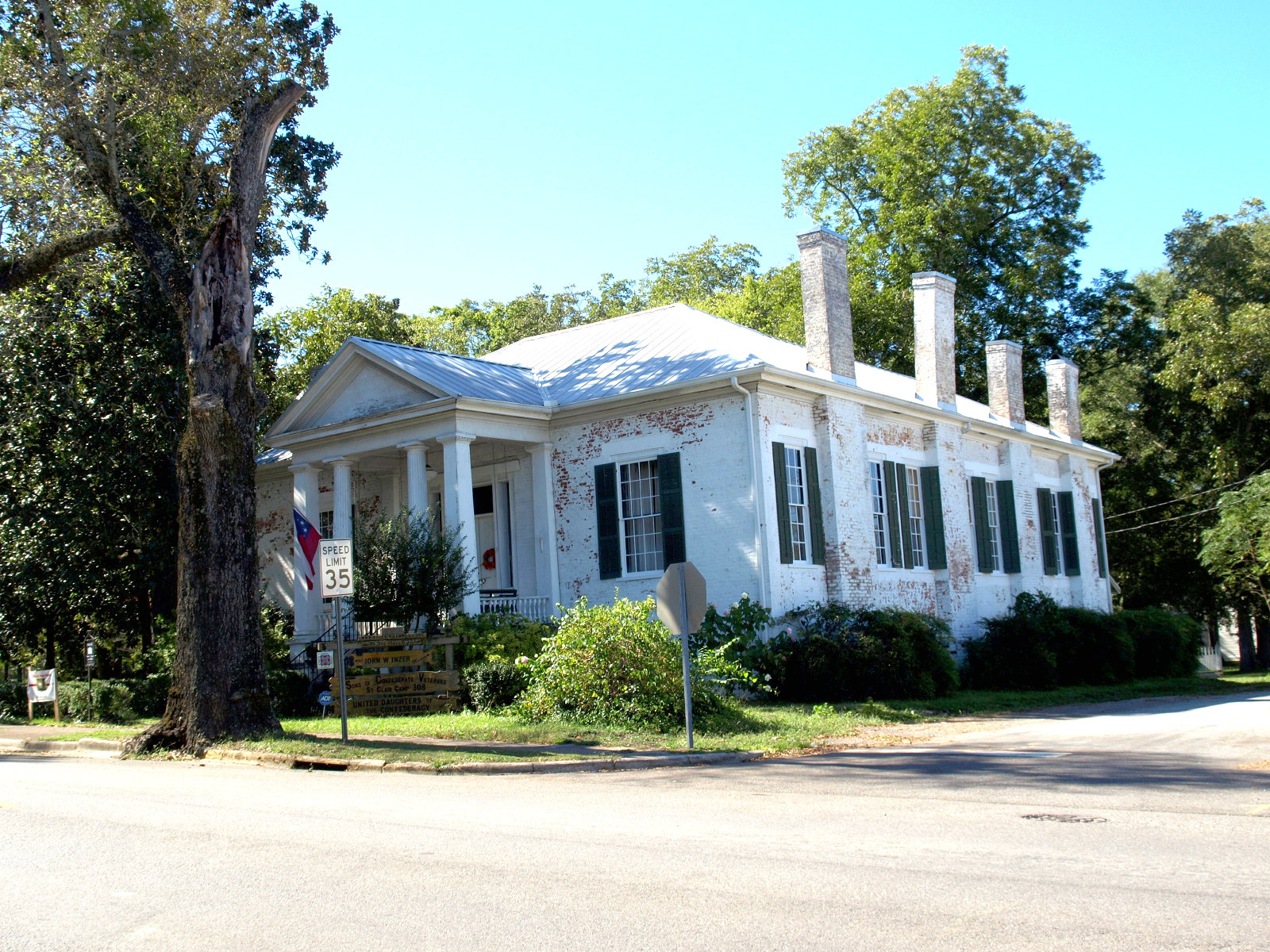
Inzer House, Ashville

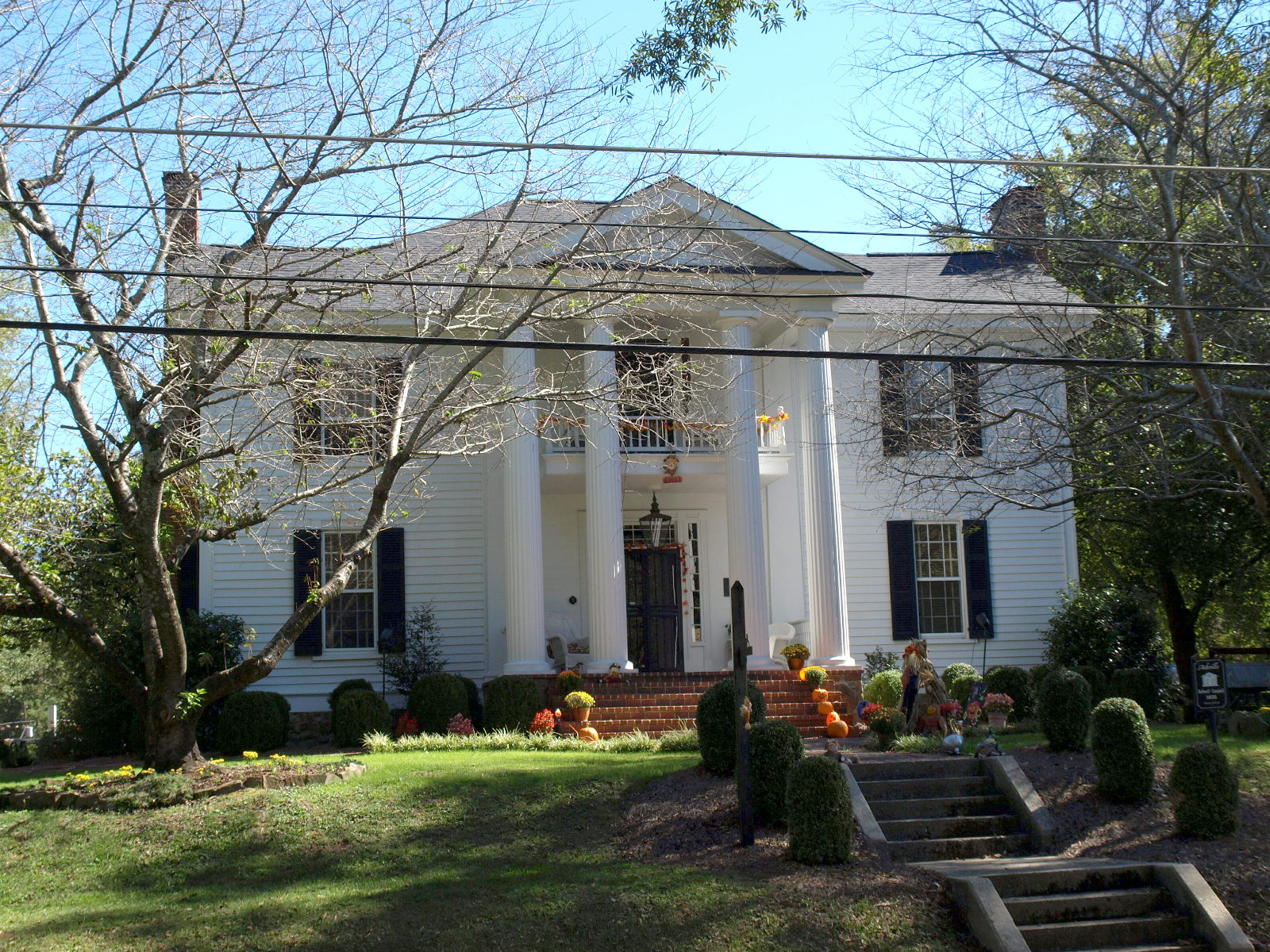
Dr. James J. Bothwell House, Ashville

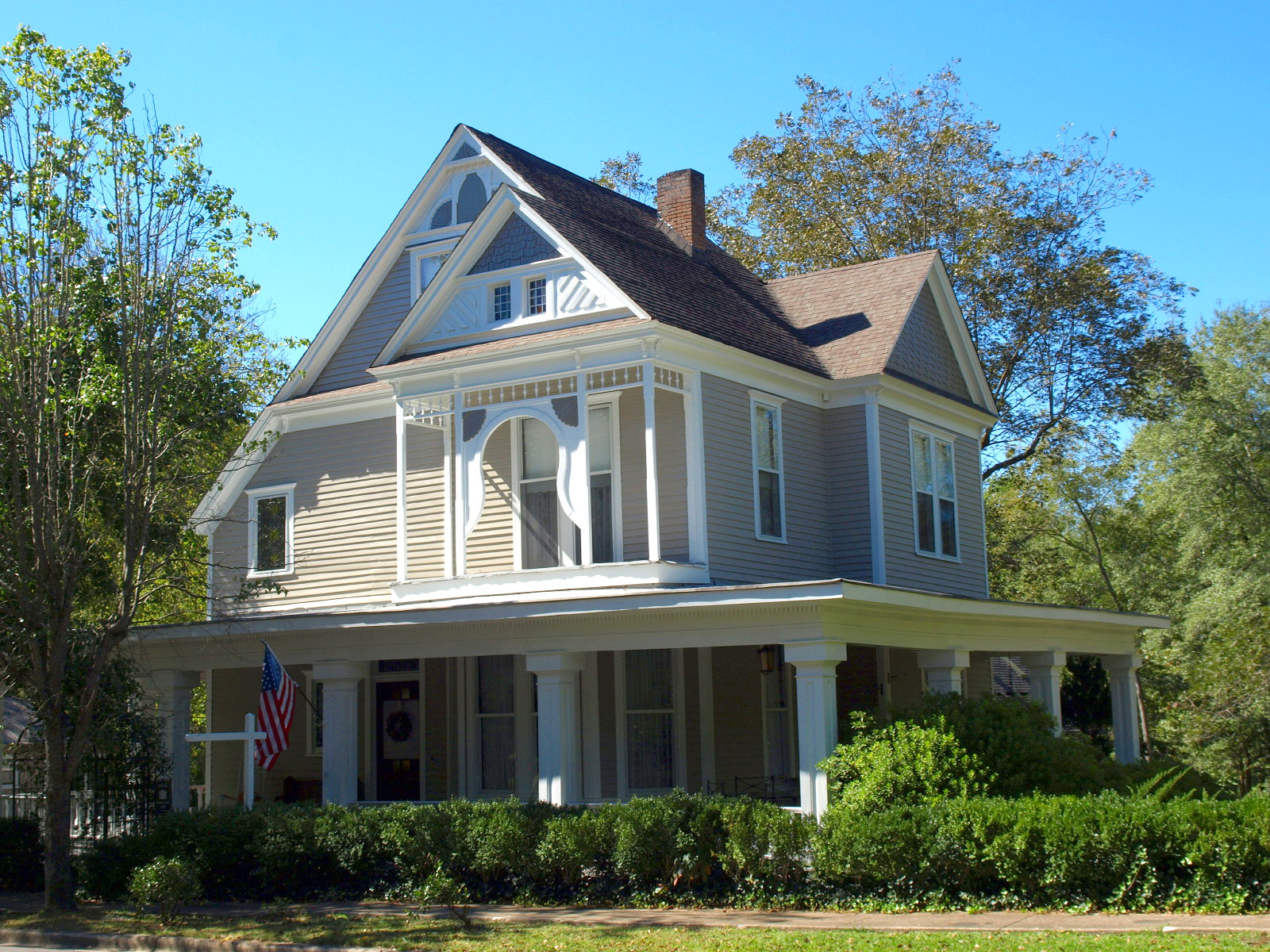
Judge Elisha Robinson House, Ashville

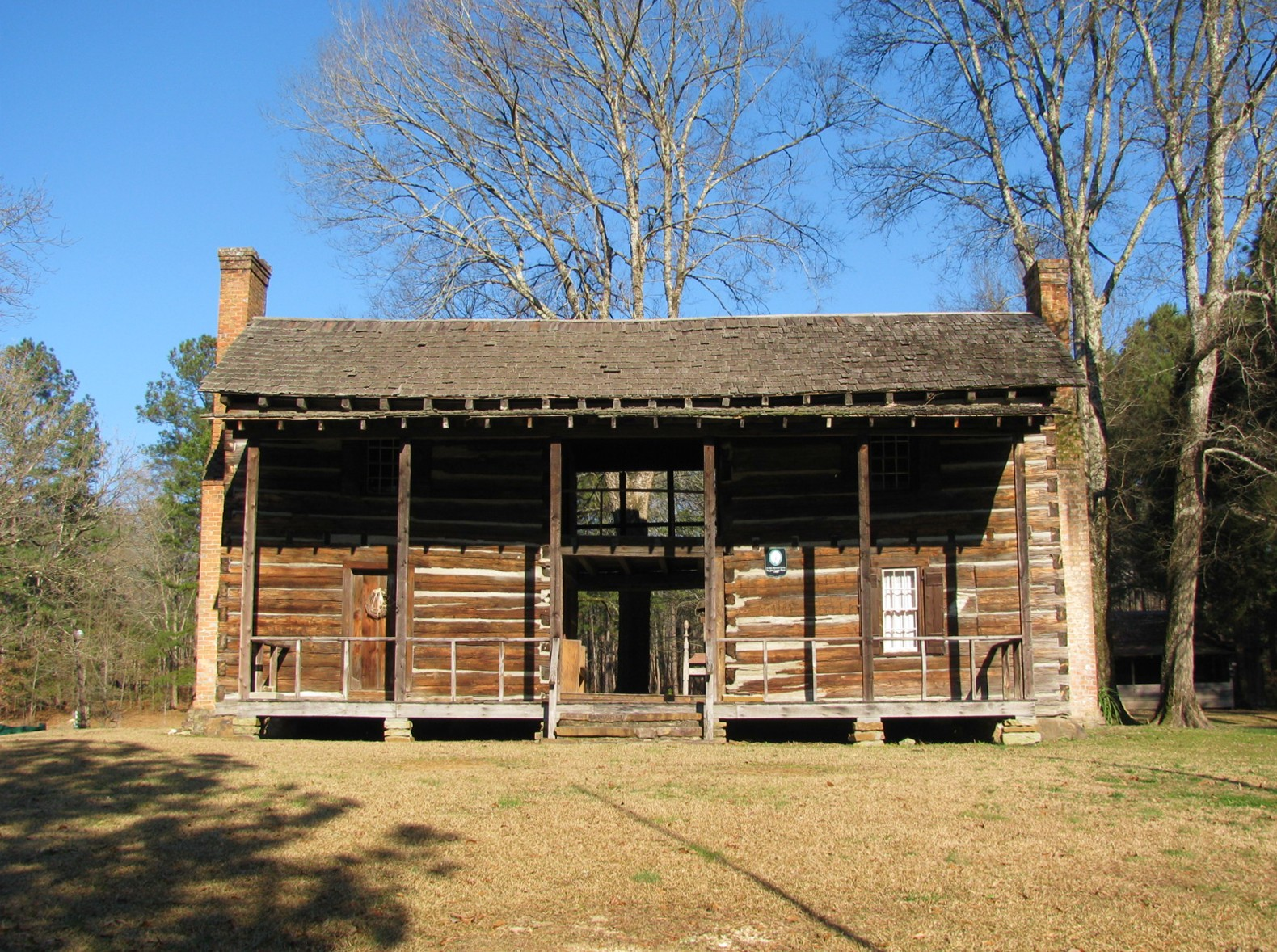
John Looney House, Ashville

== See also ==
- Confederate Monument (Ashville, Alabama)
