= WYLS (FM) =

- York, Alabama; United States
- Broadcast area: Meridian, Mississippi
- Frequency: 104.9 MHz (HD Radio)

Programming
- Format: Sports
- Subchannels: HD2: Classic hip hop; HD3: Classic hits

Ownership
- Owner: Sarah Grant and William Grant; (Grantell Broadcasting, LLC)

History
- First air date: November 22, 1976
- Former call signs: WSLY (1974–2025)
- Call sign meaning: York, Livingston, Sumter

Technical information
- Licensing authority: FCC
- Facility ID: 24820
- Class: C2
- ERP: 50,000 watts
- HAAT: 150 meters (490 ft)
- Transmitter coordinates: 32°16′54.5″N 88°15′23″W
- Translators: HD2: 100.1 W261CS (Meridian); HD3: 100.9 W265BO (Meridian)

Links
- Public license information: Public file; LMS

WYLS (104.9 FM) is a radio station broadcasting a sports format. Licensed to York, Alabama, United States, the station is currently owned by Sarah and William Grant, through licensee Grantell Broadcasting, LLC. It features ESPN Radio and The Paul Finebaum Radio Network.

Previously the station had a mixed urban contemporary format (hip hop, R&B, blues, and gospel), then transitioned over to a full-time gospel format. The station also broadcast with the Jack FM music variety format.

On September 4, 2020, WSLY changed its format from sports to mainstream rock, branded as "Sly 104.9". In December 2023 WSLY changed its format from mainstream rock back to sports talk. On April 22, 2025, the station swapped call signs with AM sister station WYLS.
