= Cordarro Law =

American football player (born 1988)

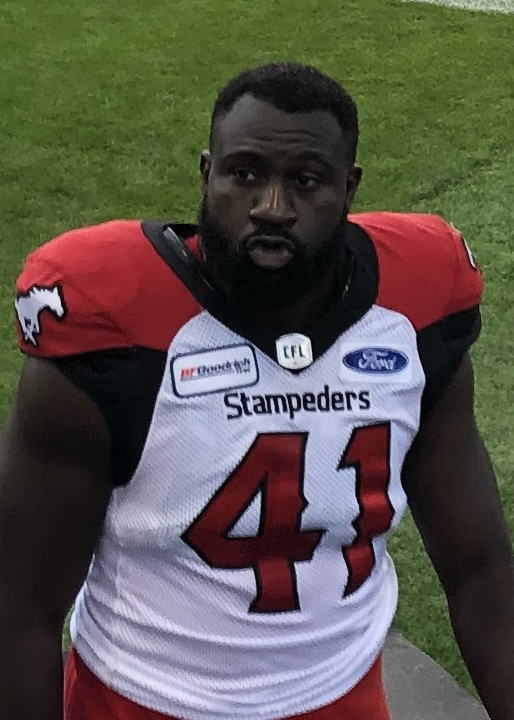
- Law with the Calgary Stampeders in 2019

No. 99, 32
- Position: Defensive end

Personal information
- Born: October 15, 1988 (age 38); Whitfield, Alabama, U.S.
- Listed height: 6 ft 2 in (1.88 m)
- Listed weight: 262 lb (119 kg)

Career information
- High school: Sumter County (AL)
- College: Southern Mississippi
- NFL draft: 2012: undrafted

Career history
- Seattle Seahawks (2012)*; Calgary Stampeders (2012–2013); San Diego Chargers (2014–2015); Calgary Stampeders (2016–2020); Toronto Argonauts (2021)
- * Offseason or practice squad member only

Awards and highlights
- Grey Cup champion (2018); First-team All-C-USA (2011); Second-team All-C-USA (2010)

Career NFL statistics
- Total tackles: 21
- Sacks: 1
- Pass deflections: 1
- Stats at Pro Football Reference
- Stats at CFL.ca

Cordarro Law (born October 15, 1988) is an American former professional football player who was a defensive lineman in the National Football League (NFL) and Canadian Football League (CFL). He played college football for the Southern Miss Golden Eagles. He was signed by the Seattle Seahawks as an undrafted free agent in 2012. He was also a member of the Calgary Stampeders, San Diego Chargers, and Toronto Argonauts.

== Early life ==
Cordarro Law was born on October 15, 1988, in Whitfield, Alabama. He attended Sumter County High School in York, Alabama.

== College career ==
Law played four seasons with the Southern Mississippi Golden Eagles. For his career, he recorded 191 tackles, including 54 tackles for loss, and 27.5 sacks. Law set a school record with 14 career forced fumbles. He was a first-team all-Conference USA selection in 2011 and a second-team selection in 2010.

=== College statistics ===
Year	School	Conf	Class	Pos	G	Solo	Ast	Tot	Loss	Sk	PD	FR	FF
2008	Southern Miss	CUSA	FR	DB	13	17	4	21	6.0	5.0	0	0	2
2009	Southern Miss	CUSA	SO	DL	13	29	30	59	14.5	7.5	2	0	4
2010	Southern Miss	CUSA	JR	DL	13	28	20	48	11.5	6.0	0	2	4
2011	Southern Miss	CUSA	SR	DL	14	36	28	64	22.0	9.5	4	0	4
Career	Southern Miss				53	110	82	192	54.0	28.0	6	2	14

== Professional career ==
=== Seattle Seahawks ===
After going undrafted in the 2012 NFL draft, Law signed as a free agent by the Seattle Seahawks but was later released prior to the start of the regular season.

=== Calgary Stampeders (first stint) ===
Law signed with the Calgary Stampeders of the Canadian Football League (CFL) on October 1, 2012; nearing the end of the 2012 CFL season. He played in 3 games that season and recorded 2 quarterback sacks. The following year proved to be a breakout season for Law, as he played in 16 of the 18 regular season games, tallying 41 tackles and 14 sacks.

As a pending free agent, Law had a workout with the Baltimore Ravens (NFL) in December 2014.

=== San Diego Chargers ===
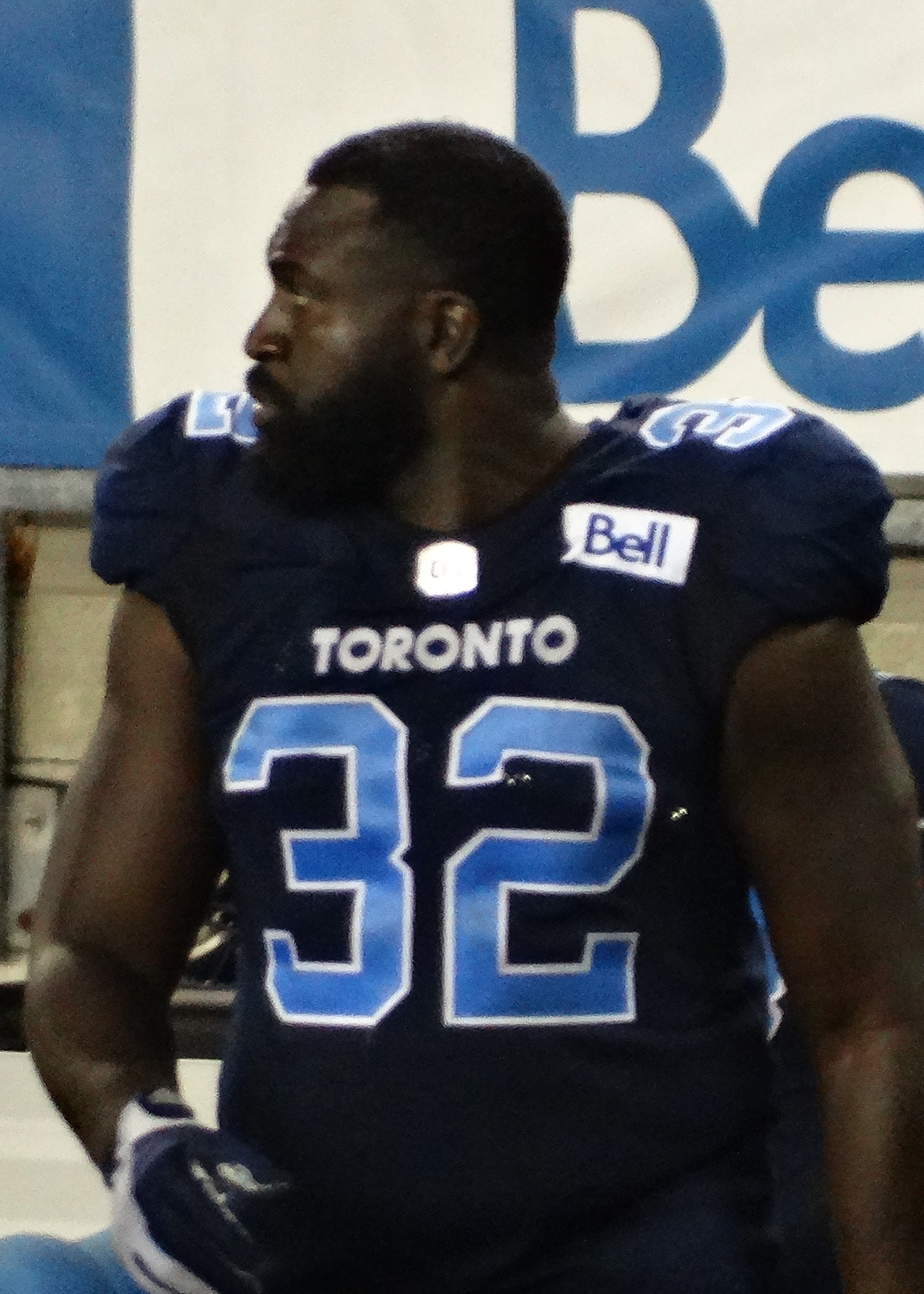
Law with the Toronto Argonauts in 2021

He signed with the San Diego Chargers on February 14, 2014. He was released on August 30, 2014, but signed to the Chargers' practice squad a day later. On September 23, 2014, Cordarro Law was promoted to the active roster due to injuries at the outside linebacker position. Law debuted against the Jacksonville Jaguars recording a sack, a pass defense, and 2 tackles. Cordarro Law ended his first NFL season with the Chargers with 9 tackles, 1 sack, and a pass defense. During his first preseason game in the 2015 season against the Dallas Cowboys, he had a sack and 2 tackle for losses. He played in 14 games in 2015 and recorded 12 tackles.

=== Calgary Stampeders (second stint) ===
Signed as a free agent with the Stampeders on September 28, 2016. During his first season back in the CFL Law played four games and had nine tackles including a tackle for a loss and three sacks and added one fumble recovery. He started in the Western Final and had two sacks and also started in the Grey Cup recorded one tackle and one knockdown. Following the season he was re-signed by be the Stampeders to a contract extension, preventing him from becoming a free agent in February 2017. Law sustained a lower-body injury in the Stamps second preseason game of 2017. On June 13, 2017, it was announced that an MRI had revealed Law sustained a broken ankle and ligament damage. He missed the entire 2017 season as a result of the injury. He played in nine regular season games in 2018 and both post-season games as he became a Grey Cup champion following the Stampeders' 106th Grey Cup win.

=== Toronto Argonauts ===
As a pending free agent entering the 2021 CFL season, Law's playing rights were traded to the Toronto Argonauts on January 31, 2021. On February 4, 2021, the Argonauts announced that they had signed Law. He became a free agent after the 2021 season.
