= Panola, Sumter County, Alabama =

Unincorporated community in Alabama, US

Panola, Alabama
- Unincorporated community Census designated place
- Location within Alabama
- Coordinates: 32°56′52″N 88°16′02″W
- Country: United States
- State: Alabama
- County: Sumter

Area
  - Total: 0.72 sq mi (1.86 km^{2})
  - Land: 0.72 sq mi (1.86 km^{2})
  - Water: 0 sq mi (0.00 km^{2})
- Elevation: 180 ft (55 m)

Population (2020)
  - Total: 71
  - Density: 99/sq mi (38.2/km^{2})
- Time zone: UTC−6 (Central (CST))
  - Summer (DST): UTC−5 (CDT)
- ZIP code: 35477
- Area codes: 205, 659
- GNIS feature ID: 2628601

Panola is an unincorporated community and census-designated place (CDP) in Sumter County, Alabama, United States. As of the 2010 census, its population was 144. Panola is 6 miles (9.7 km) north-northeast of Geiger. Panola has a post office with ZIP code 35477. The community's name comes from the Choctaw word ponola, which means "cotton".

== Demographics ==
Historical population
Census	Pop.	Note	%±
2010	144		—
2020	71		−50.7%
U.S. Decennial Census

Panola was first listed as a census designated place in the 2010 U.S. census.

=== 2020 census ===
Panola, Sumter County, Alabama – Racial and ethnic composition Note: the US Census treats Hispanic/Latino as an ethnic category. This table excludes Latinos from the racial categories and assigns them to a separate category. Hispanics/Latinos may be of any race.
Race / Ethnicity (NH = Non-Hispanic)	Pop 2010	Pop 2020	% 2010	% 2020
White alone (NH)	3	2	2.08%	2.82%
Black or African American alone (NH)	141	65	97.92%	91.55%
Native American or Alaska Native alone (NH)	0	0	0.00%	0.00%
Asian alone (NH)	0	0	0.00%	0.00%
Native Hawaiian or Pacific Islander alone (NH)	0	0	0.00%	0.00%
Other race alone (NH)	0	0	0.00%	0.00%
Mixed race or Multiracial (NH)	0	3	0.00%	4.23%
Hispanic or Latino (any race)	0	1	0.00%	1.41%
Total	144	71	100.00%	100.00%

As of the 2020 United States Census, there were 71 people living in the CDP.

== Education ==
Sumter County School District operates public schools, including Sumter Central High School.

North Sumter Junior High School was previously in operation near, but not in, the Panola CDP. The Sumter County school board voted to close the school in 2018.

== Notable people ==
- Boston Blackie (1943 – 1993), Chicago blues musician
- Bill Bruton (1925 – 1995), Major League Baseball center fielder
