= WYLS =

WYLS may refer to:

- WYLS (FM), a radio station (104.9 FM) licensed to York, New Alabama, United States
- WYLS (AM), a defunct radio station (670 AM) licensed to York, New York, which held the call sign WYLS from 1970 to 2025
