= Addison Gillespie Smith =

Alabama lawyer and politician

Addison Gillespie Smith (October 1, 1851 – May 16, 1933) was a lawyer, prosecutor, mayor, and state legislator in Alabama. He served in the Alabama Senate from 1880 to 1884. He was a member of Beta Theta Pi and studied law in Birmingham.

He was born in Livingston, Alabama. His father Edward W. Smith (died February 25, 1874) served in the state legislature. A Democrat, he represented Sumter County, Alabama.

Addison Smith graduated from the law department at Cumberland University in Tennessee in 1873. He served as mayor of Livingston. He later moved to Birmingham.

He married Florence Devereux Hopkins December 1, 1875. He had three sons and a daughter. Edward Devereux Smith was one of their sons. He became a lawyer and wrote about the Smith family's history.

Smith was a Democrat and represented Jefferson County, Alabama.

== See also ==
- University of West Alabama
