= WYLS (AM) =

Radio station in York, Alabama

- York, Alabama; United States
- Broadcast area: Livingston, Alabama
- Frequency: 670 kHz
- Branding: Rejoice WYLS

Programming
- Format: Black gospel

Ownership
- Owner: Sarah Grant and William Grant; (Grantell Broadcasting, LLC)
- Sister stations: WSLY

History
- First air date: November 1970
- Last air date: February 15, 2025
- Former call signs: WYLS (1970–2025); WSLY (2025)
- Former frequencies: 1350 kHz (1970–1988)
- Call sign meaning: York, Livingston, Sumter

Technical information
- Licensing authority: FCC
- Facility ID: 24819
- Class: D
- Power: 4,800 watts (day only)
- Transmitter coordinates: 32°31′24.5″N 88°15′28.1″W
- Translator: 102.3 W272EL (York)

Links
- Public license information: Public file; LMS
- Webcast: Listen live
- Website: Official website

WYLS (670 AM, "Rejoice 670") was a radio station licensed to serve York, Alabama, United States. The station, which operated from 1970 to 2025, was owned by Sarah and William Grant, through licensee Grantell Broadcasting, LLC. WYLS was a Class D station broadcasting on the clear-channel frequency of 670 kHz. WYLS broadcast a black gospel music format. Its license was canceled in 2025 as WSLY.

== History ==
This station began licensed operation on 1350 kHz with 5,000 watts of power in November 1970. Owned by William P. Grant d/b/a Grantell Broadcasting Company, the new station was assigned the WYLS call letters by the Federal Communications Commission.

WYLS made national headlines when the Associated Press reported that the station's soft drink machine still dispensed bottles of soda for just a nickel. The article made humorous reference to the commodity price ceilings and wage controls in the United States imposed by President Richard Nixon from 1971 to late 1973.

In July 1987, the station applied for a construction permit that would allow a change in broadcast frequency to 670 kHz. The permit was granted on October 20, 1987, and the station began licensed operation on the new frequency on January 28, 1988.

In 2003, William P. Grant died and, per the terms of his will, control of the station and the broadcast license passed to his wife, current owner Sarah P. Grant.

On February 15, 2025, severe weather in York caused the WYLS tower to collapse. The station continued to stream online. The call sign was changed to WSLY on April 22, 2025, in a swap with its FM sister station. The license was cancelled on September 18, 2025.
