= Cuba, Alabama =

Cuba
- Town
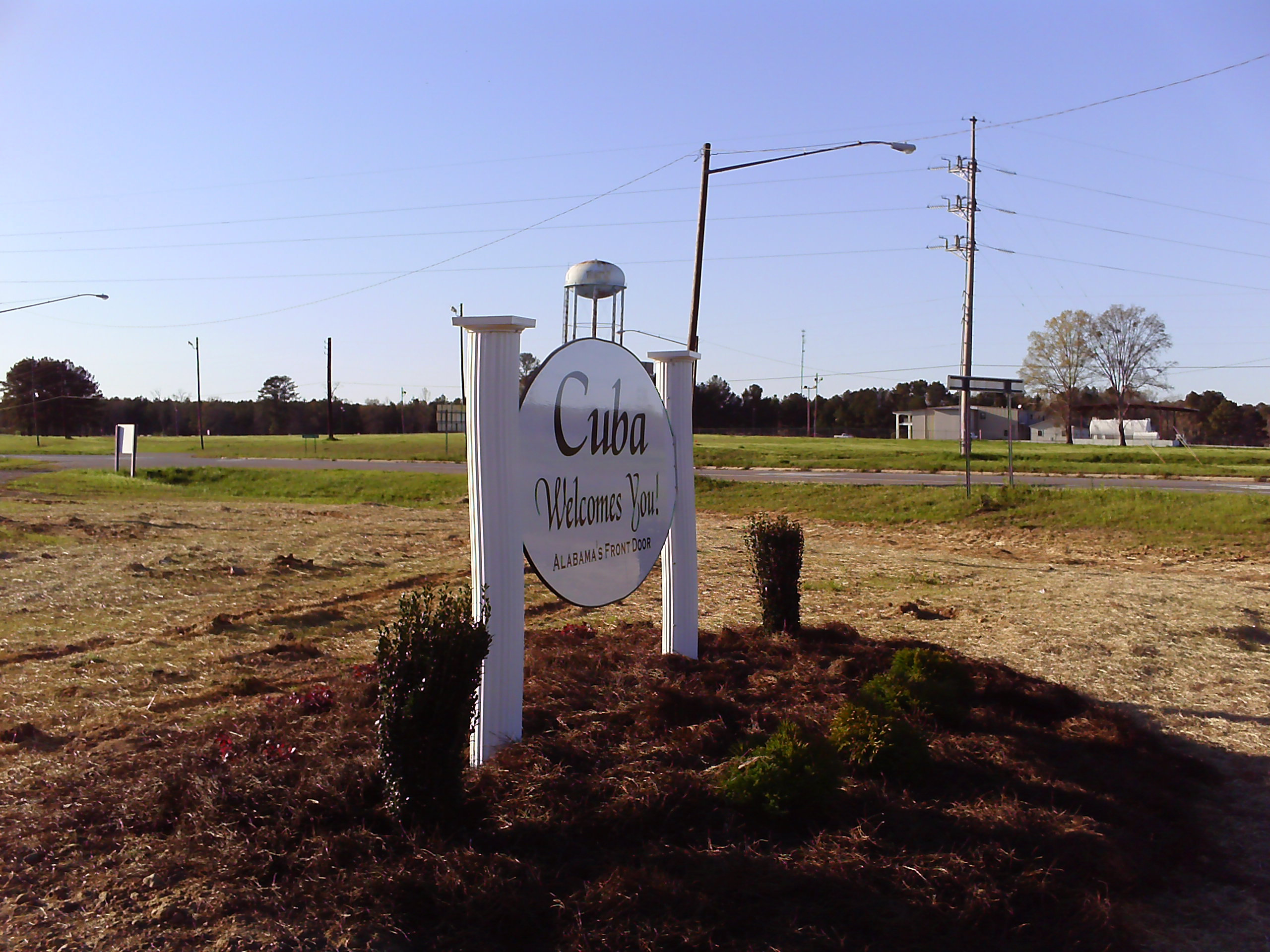
- Welcome sign to Cuba

- Location of Cuba in Sumter County, Alabama.
- Coordinates: 32°26′29″N 88°22′17″W
- Country: United States
- State: Alabama
- County: Sumter

Area
  - Total: 4.07 sq mi (10.54 km^{2})
  - Land: 4.06 sq mi (10.52 km^{2})
  - Water: 0.0077 sq mi (0.02 km^{2})
- Elevation: 240 ft (73 m)

Population (2020)
  - Total: 306
  - Density: 75.3/sq mi (29.08/km^{2})
- Time zone: UTC-6 (Central (CST))
  - Summer (DST): UTC-5 (CDT)
- ZIP code: 36907
- Area codes: 205, 659
- FIPS code: 01-18952
- GNIS feature ID: 2406344

Cuba is a town in Sumter County, Alabama, United States. At the 2020 census the population was 306, down from 346 in 2010.

== History ==
The Cuba post office existed prior to 1850, with nothing in the present-day area of the town of Cuba but wilderness. The first people to live in this site were a slaveowner named Mr. R.A. Clay, who moved from Autauga County with his family and approximately 100 slaves in 1852, and purchased all the land which later made up the town of Cuba. By 1861, the town was a thriving farming industry and had a sizable truck-crop enterprise. Also during this time, the Northeast and Southwest Railroad (later the Alabama Great Southern Railroad, Southern Railway and now Norfolk Southern) was being built. Clay donated land for the railroad right-of-way, built mainly by the people he enslaved. As the town was settled, the post office became known as Cuba Station. The Town of Cuba was incorporated in 1890 with Dr. A.L. Vaughan as its first mayor.

In 1870, Mr. Clay sold to Mr. Warner Lewis half of the town and divided it into lots, with two set aside for the building of the Baptist and Methodist churches. Cuba Baptist Church was organized in 1879; the original building still stands on the spot where it was first built. The Methodist Church was organized about 1884. This church membership dissolved many years ago. The Holiness Church was organized about 1886, the Presbyterian Church about 1906, and the Independent Holiness Church about 1925.

Mrs. Curtis Vaughan was the first person to be buried in Cuba, in 1888. Mr. R.A. Clay, the morning after her death, donated the land for the Cuba Cemetery, which later became Clay Memorial Cemetery in his honor.

== Geography ==
According to the U.S. Census Bureau, the town has a total area of 4.1 square miles (11 km^{2}), of which 4.1 square miles (11 km^{2}) is land and 0.25% is water.

=== Climate ===
The climate in this area is characterized by hot, humid summers and generally mild to cool winters. According to the Köppen Climate Classification system, Cuba has a humid subtropical climate, abbreviated "Cfa" on climate maps.

== Demographics ==
Historical population
Census	Pop.	Note	%±
1880	232		—
1890	265		14.2%
1900	384		44.9%
1910	650		69.3%
1920	719		10.6%
1930	542		−24.6%
1940	557		2.8%
1950	525		−5.7%
1960	390		−25.7%
1970	386		−1.0%
1980	486		25.9%
1990	390		−19.8%
2000	363		−6.9%
2010	346		−4.7%
2020	306		−11.6%
U.S. Decennial Census; 2013 Estimate

=== 2020 census ===
Cuba Racial Composition
Race	Num.	Perc.
White	265	86.6%
Black or African American	34	11.11%
Asian	1	0.33%
Other/Mixed	4	1.31%
Hispanic or Latino	2	0.65%

As of the 2020 United States census, there were 306 people, 206 households, and 129 families residing in the town.

=== 2010 census ===
As of the 2010 United States census, there were 346 people living in the town. The racial makeup of the town was 85.0% White, 13.0% Black, 0.6% Native American and 1.2% from two or more races. 0.3% were Hispanic or Latino of any race.

=== 2000 census ===
As of the census of 2000, there were 363 people, 162 households, and 113 families living in the town. The population density was 89.3 inhabitants per square mile (34.5/km^{2}). There were 186 housing units at an average density of 45.8 per square mile (17.7/km^{2}). The racial makeup of the town was 91.74% White, 7.71% Black or African American, 0.28% Pacific Islander, and 0.28% from two or more races. 0.28% of the population were Hispanic or Latino of any race.

There were 162 households, out of which 23.5% had children under the age of 18 living with them, 61.1% were married couples living together, 7.4% had a female householder with no husband present, and 30.2% were non-families. 29.0% of all households were made up of individuals, and 21.0% had someone living alone who was 65 years of age or older. The average household size was 2.24 and the average family size was 2.75.

In the town, the population was spread out, with 18.5% under the age of 18, 8.0% from 18 to 24, 24.2% from 25 to 44, 30.3% from 45 to 64, and 19.0% who were 65 years of age or older. The median age was 44 years. For every 100 females, there were 82.4 males. For every 100 females age 18 and over, there were 80.5 males.

The median income for a household in the town was $50,795, and the median income for a family was $57,500. Males had a median income of $36,500 versus $20,179 for females. The per capita income for the town was $21,130. About 3.3% of families and 6.0% of the population were below the poverty line, including 10.1% of those under age 18 and 13.9% of those age 65 or over.

== Notable people ==
- Clay Shaw (politician), US House of Representatives.
- J. P. Shelton, former member of the Alabama House of Representatives.

== Education ==
Sumter County School District operates area public schools, including Kinterbish Junior High School is in an unincorporated area near Cuba; and Sumter Central High School.

Cuba previously housed Cuba State Secondary Agricultural High School and Cuba Institute.

== Gallery ==
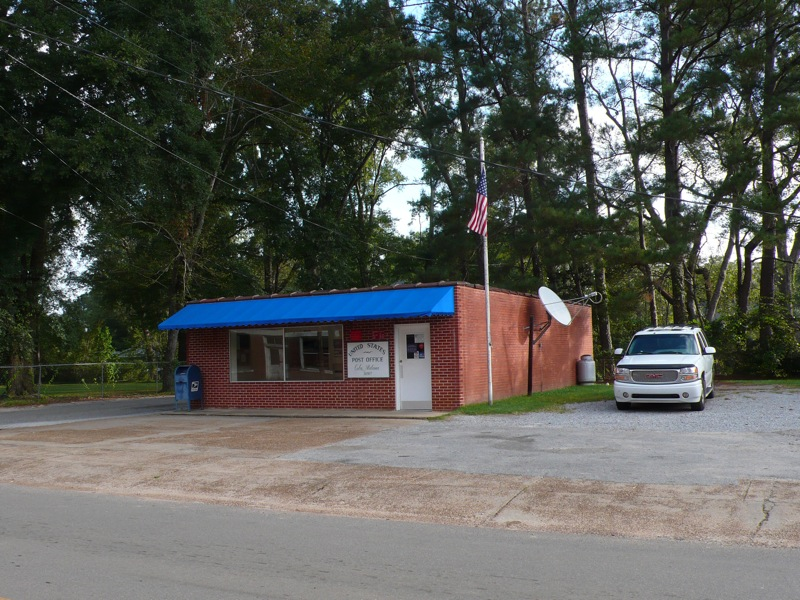
The U.S. Post Office in Cuba, Alabama

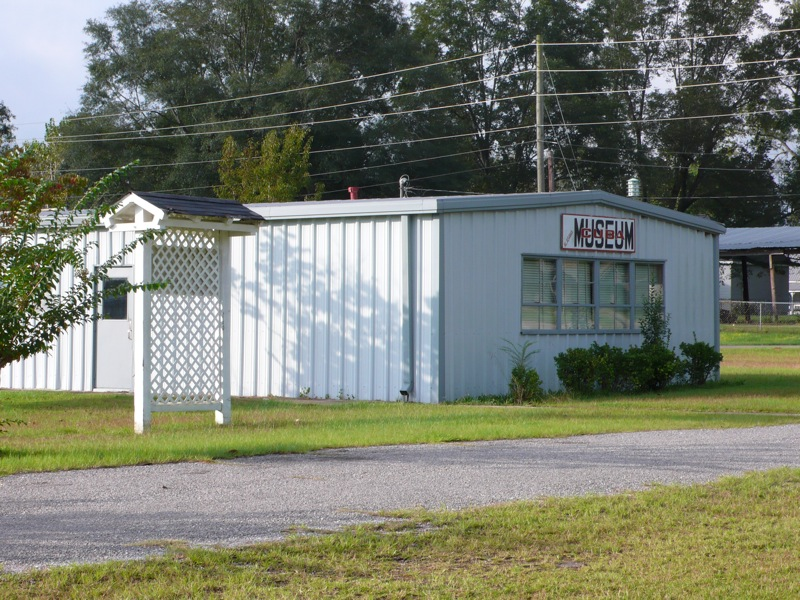
The local museum in Cuba, Alabama
