= Eleanor Churchill Gibbs =

American educator (1840–1925)

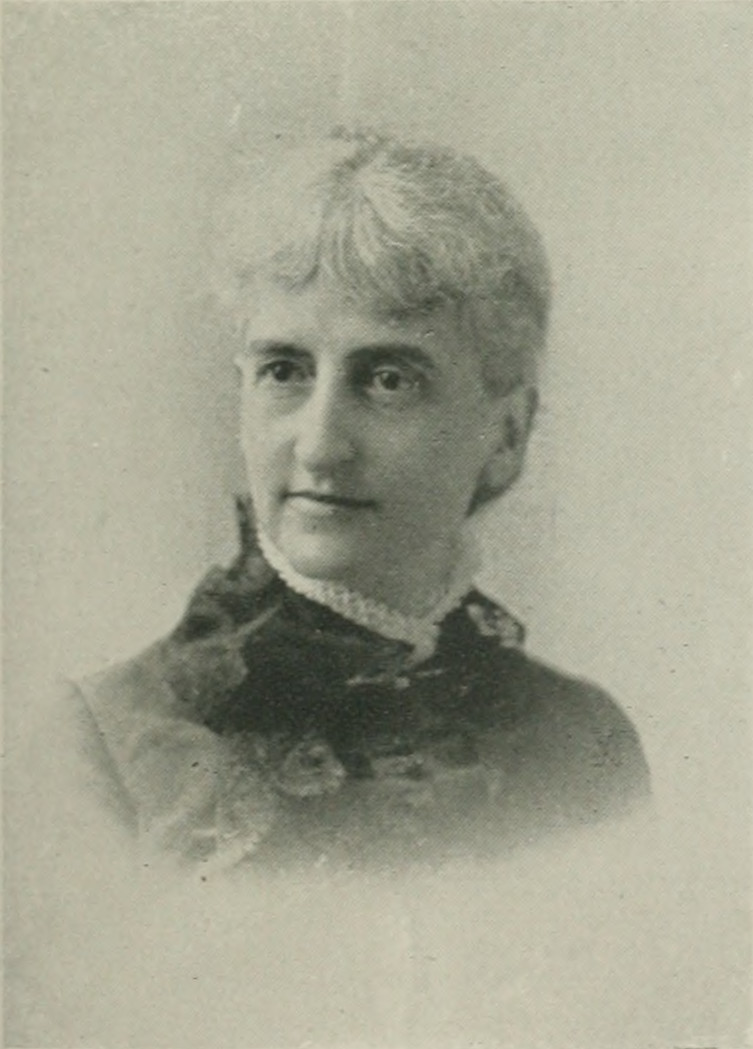
- Portrait from A Woman of the Century
- Born: October 3, 1840; Livingston, Alabama, U.S.
- Died: July 13, 1925 (aged 84); Memphis, Tennessee, U.S.
- Occupations: educator; writer

Eleanor Churchill Gibbs (October 3, 1840 – July 13, 1925) was an educator from the state of Alabama, who taught in Livingston, Selma, Rome, and Anniston. A writer of the American South, she was also a paid contributor to various periodicals.

== Early life and education ==
Eleanor (nickname, "Nellie") Churchill Gibbs was born in the plantation home of her parents, "Oak Shade," near Livingston, Sumter County, Alabama, October 3, 1840.

Her father was Charles Richardson Gibbs. He was born in July 8, 1786, at Orange Court House, Orange County, Virginia. He lived until 1835 in Virginia. Charles was an officer in the War of 1812, a merchant and planter. He removed to Sumter County, where he married his third wife, Eleanor Stuart Thornton (1806-1888), who was a descendant of Mildred Washington, the aunt of General George Washington. She was a granddaughter of Churchill and Judith (Richardson) Gibbs, who lived at Orange County, Virginia, the former an officer in the Revolutionary war, being at Stony Point and Brandywine, and in other battles, with Gen. Washington during the winter at Valley Forge, and continuing in service to the close of the war, and of William and Eleanor (Brown) Thornton, who lived in Culpeper, Virginia; great-granddaughter of Rev. John and Mrs. Ann (Butler) Spotswood Thompson, the latter previously the wife of Governor Alexander Spotswood, of Virginia.

In the seventeenth century, the Gibbs family emigrated from Kent, England, to Barbados, from which three brothers came to the Thirteen Colonies. The name was "Gibbes". Zachary, one of the three, was a Tory and went to England; as a consequence, Churchill Gibbs changed the spelling to "Gibbs". Descendants in South Carolina of the third brother, retained the "e".

Eleanor's siblings were Charlotte, Susan, and Martha.

Eleanor received her early education largely at home, being taught by her mother and a private tutor. She completed the course at Livingston Female Academy (now University of West Alabama), in Livingston, Alabama. There, she was a charter member of the Primrose Club, the club having been formed after a group of young women had been studying literary work under Gibbs for several months. She continued her studies in higher mathematics and science under Dr. Henry Tutwiler, at Green Springs, Alabama, and pursued courses in literature, history and ethnology in the University of Chicago.

== Career ==
In 1865, she accepted the position of assistant teacher in Livingston Female Academy; in the middle of the year, in 1870, she was elected principal of the institution. In 1875, she resigned that position in order to take charge of high school work at the Dallas Academy in Selma, Alabama. During the 12 years from 1887, she was head of the department of English in Shorter College, Rome, Georgia. In the two years following, she held a similar position in Anniston College for Young Ladies; in 1901 became head of department of English in Alabama normal college, Livingston (now, University of West Alabama).

Gibbs was also a paid contributor to different periodicals in Boston, Philadelphia, Chicago, and elsewhere, including the New England Journal of Education and The Atlantic Monthly. Character drawings of African Americans in her plantation sketches were by Jules Maurice Gaspard.

== Death ==
Eleanor Churchill Gibbs died in Memphis, Tennessee, July 13, 1925. Interment was in Anniston, Alabama.

== Selected works ==
- "Under the China Tree", Blue and Gray, 1893
- "In a Cotton Field", Fetter's Southern Magazine, 1894
- "Aunt Vilet", Herald and Review, 1916
- "The Solcer's Fun'ral (Granny Ann's Cuyous Tales)", Our Southern Home, 1924
