= Joel Campbell Du Bose =

American educator and politician (1855–1917)

Sketches of Alabama History, readable pdf

Joel Campbell DuBose (December 17, 1855 - March 7, 1917), also written Joel Campbell Du Bose, was an educator, author, and state legislator in Alabama from 1903 to 1907.

== Early life and education ==
DuBose was born December 17, 1855, in Sumter County, Alabama, the son of Benjamin, a school teacher, and his wife Sarah. DuBose attended the University of Alabama, earning his bachelor's degree in 1878, then his master's of art in 1882.

== Career ==
The Ideal University, readable pdf

He founded the Gulf States Historical Magazine, a bi-monthly journal publishing on the history of the Gulf Coast of the United States, with Alabama historian Thomas F. Owen in 1902. Owen was the magazine's first editor, while DuBose was the business manager. He took over as editor the second year, but lacking financial or institutional support the magazine folded.

== Publications ==
- Notable men of Alabama : personal and genealogical, with portraits
- Sketches of Alabama History (1901)
- The Ideal University (1904)
- Alabama History, textbook used in Alabama schools for decades

== Personal life ==
DuBose married Alice Vivian Horn in August 1883 and had seven children together. DuBose died March 7, 1917.
