= Lakewood (Livingston, Alabama) =

Antebellum mansion in Livingston, Alabama

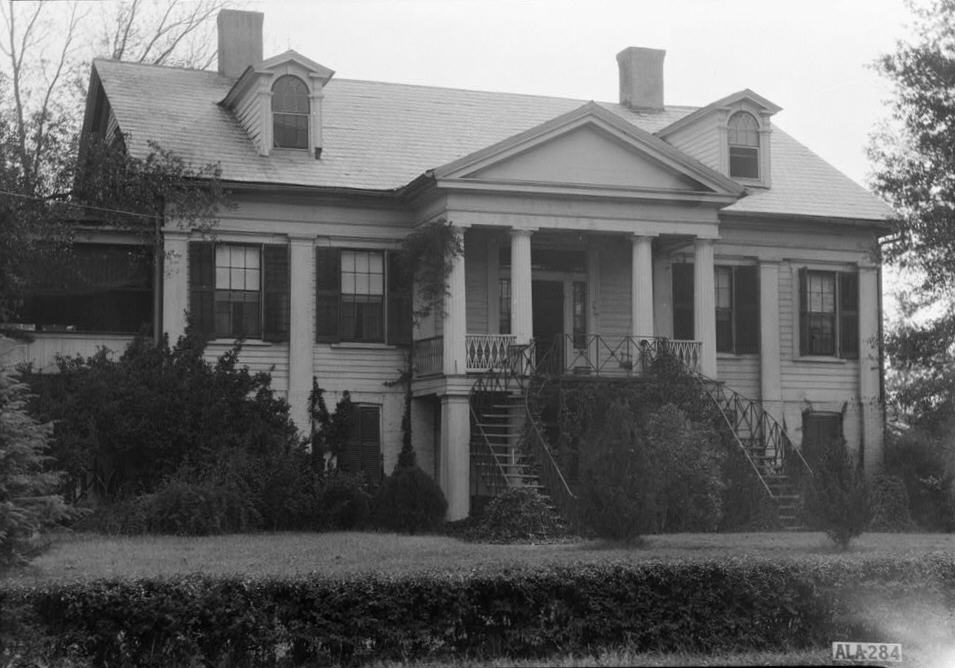
- Lakewood as recorded by the HABS in 1936

- Location within Alabama
- 32.58749°N 88.18372°W
- Location: Livingston, Alabama

History
- Built: 1840

Site notes
- Architectural style: Greek Revival
- Governing body: Private

Lakewood is a historic antebellum mansion in Livingston, Alabama, United States. The two-and-a-half-story Greek Revival-style house was completed in 1840. The house was recorded by the Historic American Buildings Survey in 1936. It was added to Alabama's Places in Peril in 2012, a listing that highlights significantly endangered properties in the state.

== History ==
Lakewood was built for Joseph Lake, a native of North Carolina, by Hiram W. Bardwell, a master builder. Construction was completed in 1840. Located adjacent to the University of West Alabama, Julia Strudwick Tutwiler, a Lake relative, periodically resided in the house from 1881 to 1910 while she served as president of the university. It was then known as Livingston Normal College. The house was extensively photographed by Alex Bush for the Historic American Buildings Survey in November and December 1936.

Lakewood has continued to be owned by descendants of the Lake family to the current day. The house and its surviving 10 acres (4.0 ha) of grounds were listed on the Places in Peril in 2012 due to the immediate threat of its acquisition by developers.

== Architecture ==
The house has a plan that is relatively rare in early Alabama architecture. The plan features a brick ground floor that is topped by one and a half stories of wood-frame construction. The ground floor originally contained domestic spaces, with the formal rooms on the principal floor and bedrooms on the upper floor. A central hallway is present on all levels.

The facade is five bays wide, with central entrance doors on the ground and principal floors. The bays are divided by two-story Doric pilasters, with the middle third of the facade occupied by a two-tiered tetrastyle Doric portico. Two curved wrought iron staircases ascend from ground level to the front center of the upper portico, leading to the formal entrance.
