= University Charter School =

Charter school in Livingston, Alabama

Coordinates: 32.586124°N 88.189018°W

Information
- Established: 2018; 8 years ago
- Grades: Pre-Kindergarten - Grade 12
- Enrollment: c.300

University Charter School (UCS) is a charter school in Lyon Hall, on the campus of the University of West Alabama in Livingston, Alabama.

== Background ==
It opened in 2018, with grades PreK-8, with plans to add one more grade each year until it reaches the 12th grade. It opened with 300 students. More than half of the students were black and fewer than half were white. Therefore, media outlets described the school as the first de facto racially integrated school in Sumter County.

In an opinion article Wanda Jackson, a Washington, DC resident who originated from Sumter County, stated that there were earlier integrated schools. She cited the Rosenwald schools, which had some white students, and a group of black students who integrated Livingston High School in the 1960s.

Initial plans called for the school to be in the former Livingston High School. In 2018 the Sumter County district board attempted to get an injunction against the opening of UCS.

== Background ==
Prior to 1970s schools in Sumter County were by law, and later de facto, racially segregated. Even though the Sumter County School District was ordered to de facto desegregate by the federal courts system in 1970, white families had immediately moved their children to Sumter Academy, a segregation academy, leaving the public schools majority black. Joe Nettles, the American football coach at Sumter Academy, stated that chatter about a proposed charter school convinced some prospective families that Sumter Academy was bound to decline and close anyway, so they chose not to enroll their children. Sumter Academy closed in 2017.
