= Marko Mitchell =

American football player (born 1985)

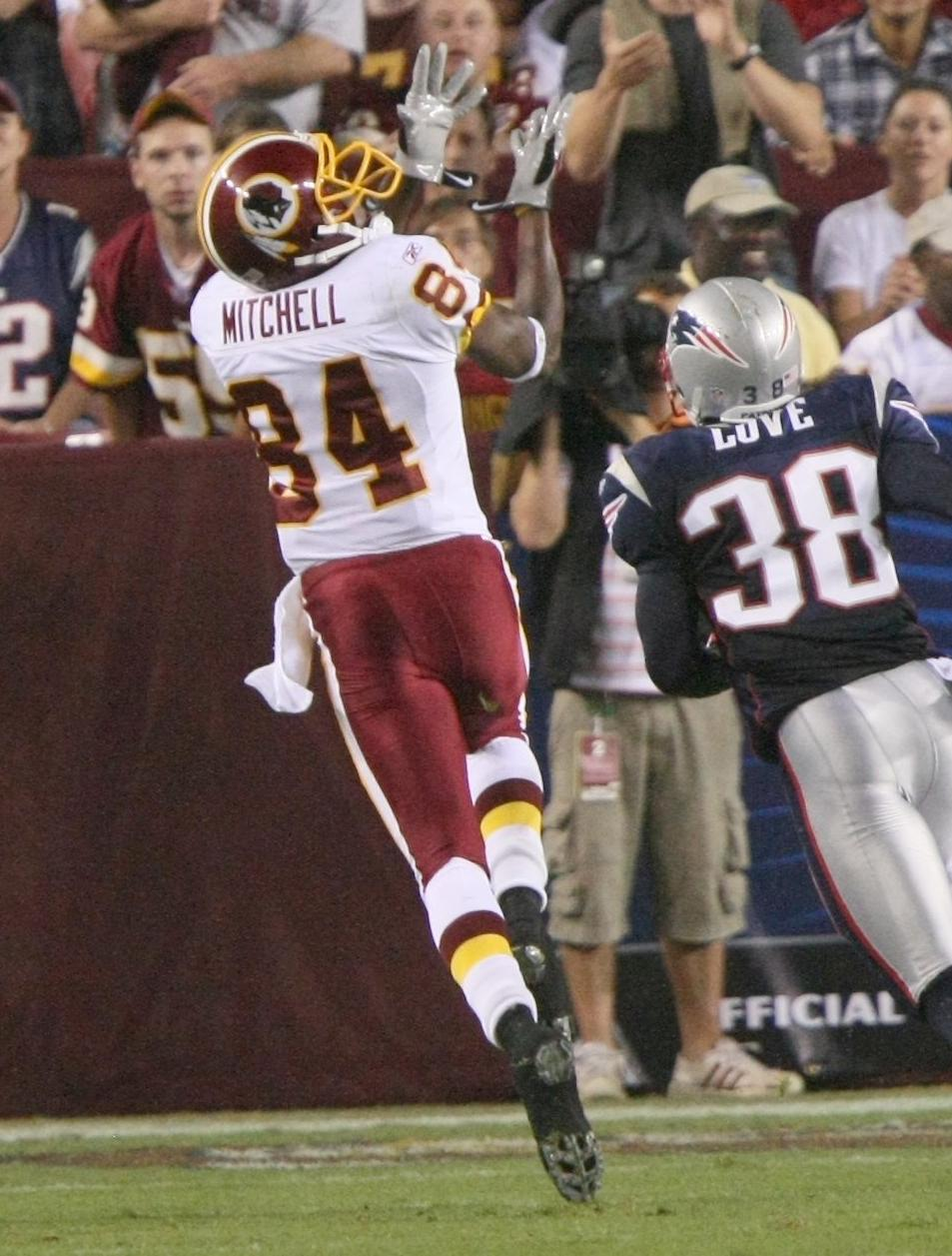
- Mitchell catching a touchdown pass against New England on August 28, 2009

No. 84
- Position: Wide receiver

Personal information
- Born: March 11, 1985 (age 41); Port Huron, Michigan, U.S.
- Listed height: 6 ft 4 in (1.93 m)
- Listed weight: 218 lb (99 kg)

Career information
- High school: Sumter County (York, Alabama)
- College: Nevada
- NFL draft: 2009: 7th round, 243rd overall pick

Career history
- Washington Redskins (2009); Detroit Lions (2010)*; Minnesota Vikings (2010)*; Edmonton Eskimos (2010); Calgary Stampeders (2011)*
- * Offseason or practice squad member only

Awards and highlights
- 2008 first-team All-WAC

Career NFL statistics
- Receptions: 4
- Receiving yards: 32
- Stats at Pro Football Reference

Marko Terrell Mitchell (born March 11, 1985) is an American former professional football player who was a wide receiver in the National Football League (NFL) and Canadian Football League (CFL). He was selected by the Washington Redskins in the seventh round of the 2009 NFL draft. He played college football for the Nevada Wolf Pack.

Mitchell was also a member of the Detroit Lions and Minnesota Vikings.

== Early life ==
Mitchell was born on March 11, 1985, in Port Huron, Michigan, to mother Geneva Mitchell. He attended Sumter County High School in York, Alabama, where he was a standout basketball player. He began playing football during his junior year. Alabama recruiters showed interest in Mitchell, but he did not score high enough on the SAT.

== College career ==
He initially attended Itawamba Community College in Fulton, Mississippi, but did not play on the football team. Mitchell said the school promised him an athletic scholarship, but gave it to someone else. The following year, he transferred to Mesa Community College in Mesa, Arizona, where he played football. He recorded 34 receptions for 719 yards and eight touchdowns for an average of 21.1 yards per catch.

He transferred to the University of Nevada, Reno, and played for the Wolf Pack starting in the 2006 season. That year, he saw action in all 13 games including seven starts. Against Northwestern, he recorded a season-high of six catches. He compiled two receptions for 72 yards against Utah State. He also scored against Arizona State, Idaho, and Louisiana Tech. In the 2006 MPC Computers Bowl against Miami, Mitchell recorded the Wolf Pack's only touchdown with one reception for 27 yards.

In 2007, he recorded 53 receptions for 1,129 yards and eight touchdowns, and led the team in each category. His 21.3 yards per catch ranked the second-highest average in the nation after Brennan Marion of Tulsa. Mitchell's 86.8 receiving yards per game ranked the sixth-best in the Western Athletic Conference (WAC) and 23rd in the nation. He also ranked tenth in the WAC with 4.08 receptions per game. Against San Jose State, he recorded 144 yards and a career-first two touchdowns. He also recorded at least 100 receiving yards against Fresno State, Boise State, New Mexico State.

Going into the 2008 season, he was named a Phil Steele's preseason first-team All-WAC, Athlon Sports preseason second-team All-WAC, and Lindy's preseason second-team All-WAC. Mitchell saw action in all 13 games and compiled 61 receptions for 1,141 yards and ten touchdowns. He recorded 100-yard games against Texas Tech, Idaho, Utah State, Louisiana Tech, and against Maryland in the 2008 Humanitarian Bowl. After the season, he was named to the All-WAC first-team.

== Professional career ==
=== Washington Redskins ===
Mitchell was selected in the seventh round of the 2009 NFL draft (243rd overall) by the Washington Redskins. At the 2009 NFL Combine, he ran the 40-yard dash in 4.49 seconds, and his size and speed had impressed the Redskins staff. He was expected to compete with 12-year NFL veteran James Thrash for the fifth wide receiver position on the Washington roster, but Thrash was released in June after failing a physical. On June 13, the Washington Redskins signed Marko Mitchell to a 4-year, $1.793 million contract.

On May 3, 2010, Mitchell was waived by the Redskins.

=== Detroit Lions ===
Mitchell was claimed off waivers by the Detroit Lions on May 5, 2010. He was waived on June 25.

=== Minnesota Vikings ===
Mitchell was claimed off waivers by the Minnesota Vikings on June 28, 2010. After playing in three pre-season exhibition games Mitchell was waived by the Vikings on August 31, 2010.

=== Edmonton Eskimos ===
The Edmonton Eskimos of the Canadian Football League signed Mitchell on September 7, 2010. He was later released.

=== Calgary Stampeeders ===
On June 3, 2011, the Calgary Stampeders signed Mitchell to an undisclosed contract. He was waived during final cuts before the start of the 2011 CFL season.
