= Warsaw, Alabama =

Unincorporated community in Alabama, United States

- Unincorporated community
- Location within the state of Alabama Warsaw, Alabama (the United States)
- Coordinates: 32°56′15″N 88°12′11″W
- Country: United States
- State: Alabama
- County: Sumter
- Elevation: 121 ft (37 m)
- Time zone: UTC-6 (Central (CST))
  - Summer (DST): UTC-5 (CDT)
- Area codes: 205, 659
- GNIS feature ID: 153894

Warsaw, also known as Jamestown, is an unincorporated community and former town in Sumter County, Alabama, United States.

== History ==
The community was originally called Jamestown, in honor of Jamestown, Virginia. The name was then changed to Warsaw, likely in honor of Warsaw, Virginia, where some of the earlier settlers of the area arrived from, and the Virginia town was named after Warsaw, Poland. Warsaw was incorporated by the Alabama Legislature in February 1839. A post office operated under the name Jamestown from 1832 to 1842, and under the name Warsaw from 1842 to 1910. Since the community was unincorporated after the 1910 census, Warsaw has kept its name the same. Warsaw is also one of the oldest communities in Sumter county having incorporated in early February 1839.

== Warsaw Precinct Demographics ==
Historical population
Census	Pop.	Note	%±
1870	2,080		—
1880	2,159		3.8%
1890	1,811		−16.1%
1900	2,059		13.7%
1910	1,624		−21.1%
