= Belmont, Alabama =

Unincorporated community in Alabama, United States

- Unincorporated community
- Location within the state of Alabama Belmont, Alabama (the United States)
- Coordinates: 32°33′31″N 87°56′33″W
- Country: United States
- State: Alabama
- County: Sumter
- Elevation: 256 ft (78 m)
- Time zone: UTC-6 (Central (CST))
  - Summer (DST): UTC-5 (CDT)
- Area codes: 205, 659
- GNIS feature ID: 113897

Belmont, also spelled Belmonte, is an unincorporated community in Sumter County, Alabama, United States.

== History ==
Belmont was originally known as Belmonte, which is derived from the Italian words bel, meaning "beautiful" and monte, meaning "mountain." Belmont was founded in 1832 by David Blacksher, Joseph Gillespie, Sr., M. Martiere (one of the French settlers of Demopolis, and the Rushing family. A post office operated under the name Belmont from 1835 to 1914.
