= Intercourse, Alabama =

Unincorporated community in Alabama, United States

- Unincorporated community
- Location within the state of Alabama Intercourse, Alabama (the United States)
- Coordinates: 32°24′59″N 88°14′25″W
- Country: United States
- State: Alabama
- County: Sumter
- Elevation: 351 ft (107 m)
- Time zone: UTC-6 (Central (CST))
  - Summer (DST): UTC-5 (CDT)
- Area codes: 205, 659

Intercourse is an unincorporated community located at a crossroads in Sumter County, Alabama, United States. A post office called Intercourse was established in 1840, and remained in operation until it was discontinued in 1913. It is named for the traffic intersection of the town's crossroads (called "intercourse" at that time). Although a share of the residents want the unusual name changed to Siloam, state maps still identify the place as Intercourse.
