= Coatopa, Alabama =

Unincorporated community in Alabama, United States

- Unincorporated community
- Location within the state of Alabama Coatopa, Alabama (the United States)
- Coordinates: 32°29′06″N 88°04′10″W
- Country: United States
- State: Alabama
- County: Sumter
- Elevation: 154 ft (47 m)
- Time zone: UTC-6 (Central (CST))
  - Summer (DST): UTC-5 (CDT)
- Area codes: 205, 659
- GNIS feature ID: 116316

Coatopa is an unincorporated community in Sumter County, Alabama, United States.

== History ==
Coatopa was founded in 1847 by J. R. Larkins and was located on the East Tennessee, Virginia and Georgia Railway. The name Coatopa is derived from the Choctaw words koi meaning "panther," a meaning "there," and hotupa meaning "wounded." A post office operated under the name Coatopa from 1866 to 1986.

== Notable person ==
- Kelly Mitchell, Queen of the Gypsy Nation, died in Coatopa in 1915
