= Kelly Mitchell, Queen of the Gypsy Nation =

American Romani leader

(undated)

Kelly Mitchell, Queen of the Gypsy Nation (c. 1868 – 1915) was an American woman who was celebrated as a leader of the Romani people in the US state of Mississippi. Her grave continues to be visited by thousands of people each year, and is one of the most important landmarks in Meridian.

== Biography ==
Kelly Mitchell was born around 1868. She is said to be the descendant of a group of Romani people who, expelled from Europe, had migrated to South America and from there made their way into the United States. A document found in the Lauderdale County Department of Archives and History says she was born in Brazil, and that her mother was a native Brazilian who married into a Romani family. Kelly then left for America and married Emil Mitchell, who in 1909 became King of the Gypsies after the death of his father. The Interment records for Rose Hill Cemetery also lists her place of birth as Brazil.

== Death and legacy ==
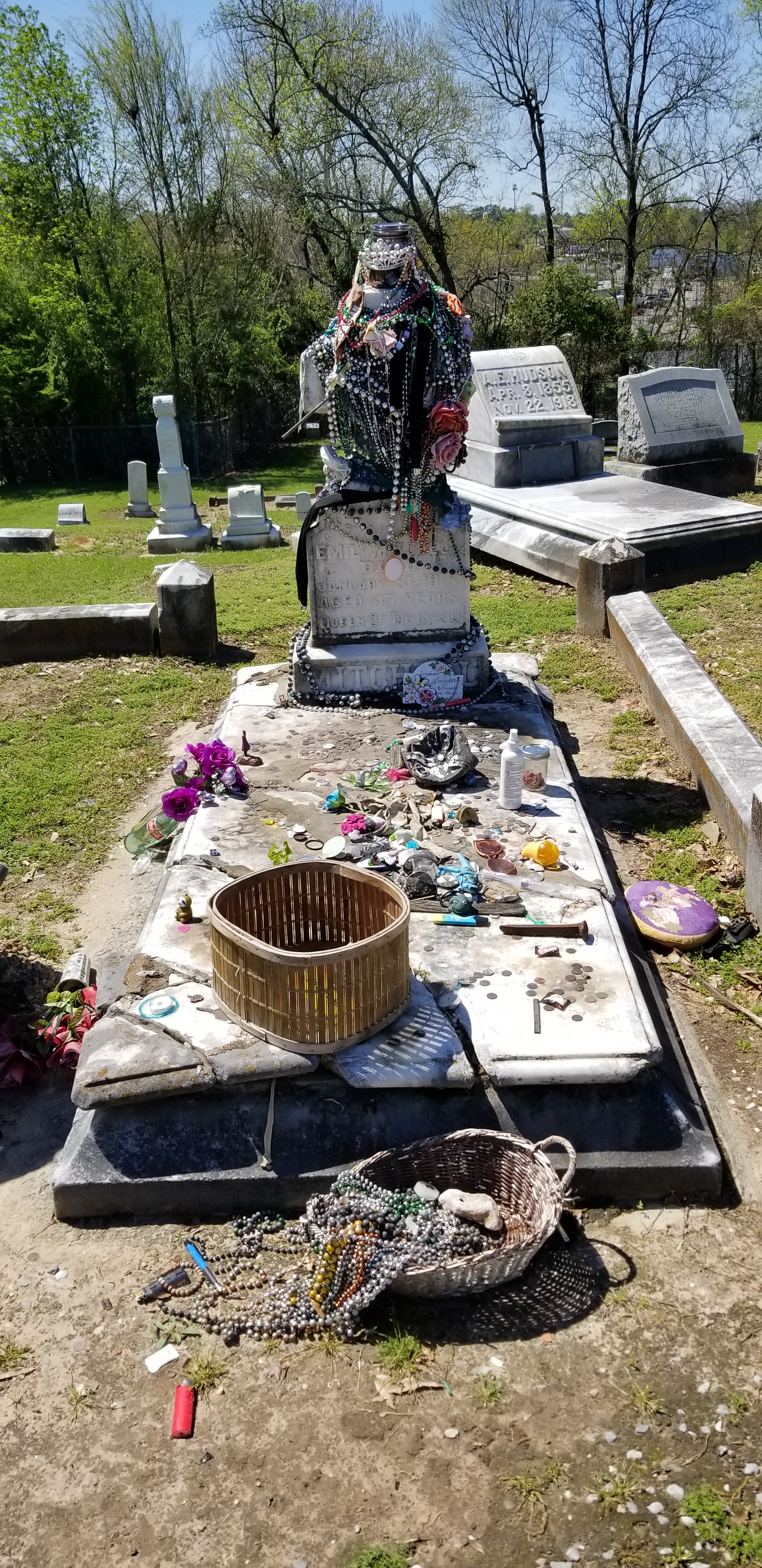
Grave of Mrs. Callie (Kelly) Mitchell, Queen of the Gypsies in America, Died 1915

She died in labor, during the birth of her 14th or 15th child, in Coatopa, Alabama, but was buried in Meridian. Her body was kept on ice for about six weeks, to allow for the news to be disseminated to various groups of Romani in the Southeast and give them time to come to Meridian. A service was held in St. Paul's Episcopal Church; 20,000 people attended her funeral. She is buried with her husband, Emil, who died in 1942. The cemetery later became the final resting place for many other Roma, including her successor, Flora.

Tens of thousands of people visit her grave each year. Various myths have been spread about her and her grave--that the coffin was made out of gold, that a huge sum of money would have been buried with her, and multiple attempts have been made to rob her grave.

Roma people were often stereotyped as fortunetellers, and some of Mitchell's relatives who live in Meridian practice the profession, though it is illegal to do so within Meridian city limits. Sandy Mitchell, who claims to be a relative of Kelly Mitchell, and his family members have practiced tarot and palm reading for decades, just outside city limits. In 2011, Jennifer Jacob Brown from the Meridian Star reported that the ACLU had started a case against the city; the ordinance was lifted in August 2011.
