= Austin Armstrong =

American football coach (born 1993)

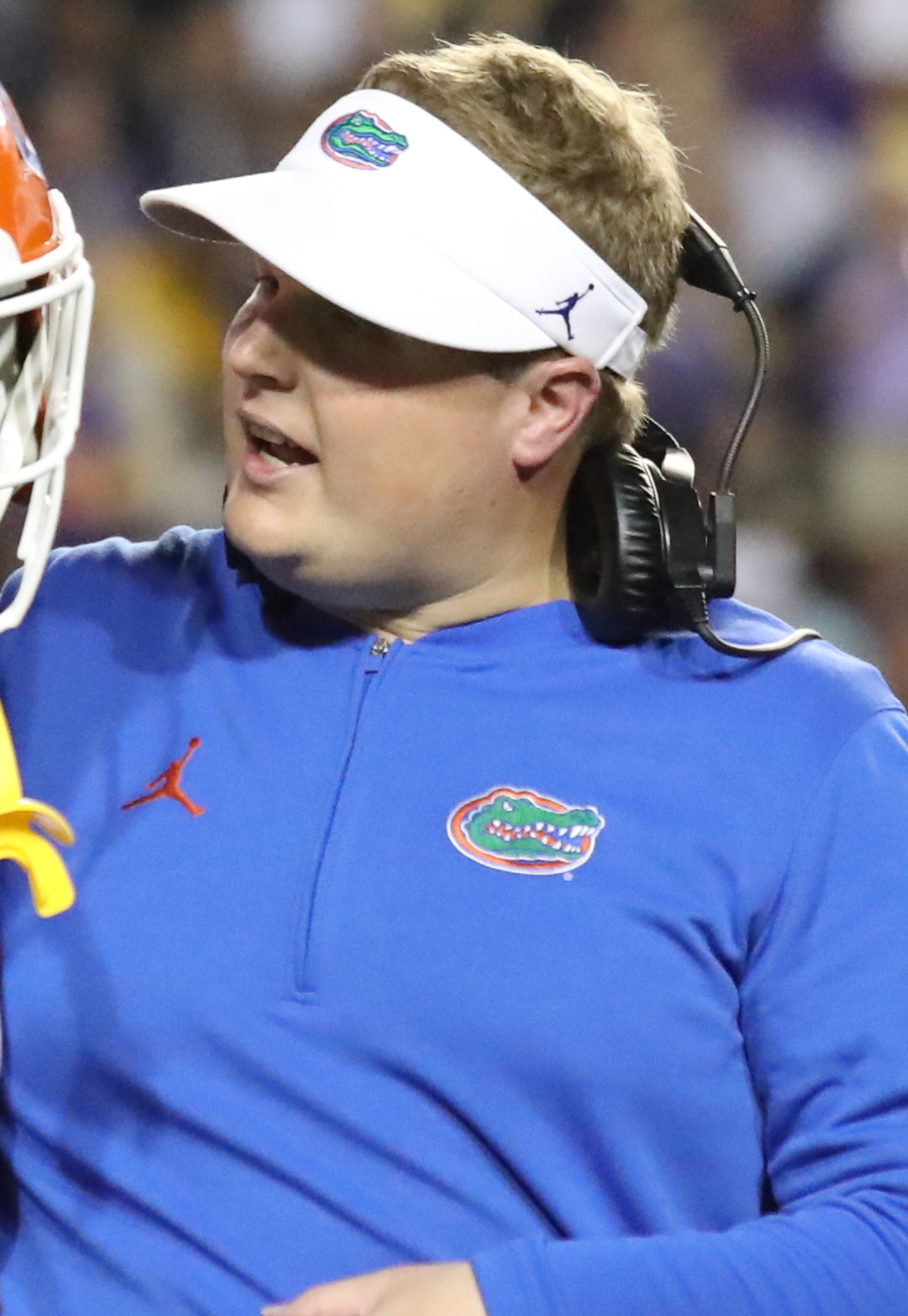
- Armstrong in 2023

Current position
- Title: Defensive coordinator
- Team: Houston
- Conference: Big 12

Biographical details
- Born: c. 1993 (age 32–33); York, Alabama, U.S.

Playing career
- 2010–2013: Huntingdon
- Position: Linebacker

Coaching career (HC unless noted)
- 2016: West Georgia (GA)
- 2017–2018: Louisiana (GA)
- 2019: Georgia (QC)
- 2020: Louisiana (LB)
- 2021–2022: Southern Miss (DC/LB)
- 2023–2024: Florida (DC)
- 2025–present: Houston (DC)

Robert Austin Armstrong (born c. 1993) is an American football coach. He is currently the defensive coordinator for the Houston Cougars. He previously served as the defensive coordinator for the Florida Gators.

== Early life ==
Armstrong was born and raised in York, Alabama, one of three children to David and Ruth Armstrong. Growing up less than an hour from Tuscaloosa, he dreamt of coaching football at Alabama from the age of ten, idolizing Nick Saban. When Armstrong was in the 3rd grade he dressed as Florida head coach Steve Spurrier for Halloween, his mother's favorite coach, and has stated that Spurrier is the reason he wears a visor when coaching. Armstrong attended Sumter Academy for high school where he was a team captain in football and baseball before attending Division III Huntingdon College in Montgomery where he played linebacker on the football team and graduated in 2014.

== Coaching career ==
Following his graduation from college, Armstrong determined to break into coaching, drove to every university in Alabama with a football team and passed out his resume to coaches. Armstrong would eventually be hired in 2016 by West Georgia as an assistant defensive line coach.

Armstrong would serve as an assistant defensive line coach for Louisiana-Lafayette under Billy Napier for the 2017 and 2018 seasons. In 2019, Armstrong served under Kirby Smart as a defensive quality control coach at Georgia and has stated that he tried to mold himself in the image of Smart. In 2020, Armstrong would return to Louisiana this time serving as the inside linebackers coach for the Ragin' Cajuns. In 2021, Armstrong was hired by Southern Miss as their defensive coordinator and inside linebackers coach, making him the youngest defensive coordinator in FBS football. In January 2023, Armstrong was hired by his idol Nick Saban as the inside linebackers coach at Alabama. A month later Napier would hire him as the defensive coordinator at Florida following the departure of Patrick Toney.
