= Sumter County School District (Alabama) =

School district in Alabama, United States

Address
- 716 Country Club Road Livingston, Alabama, 35470; United States

District information
- Type: Public
- Grades: PreK–12
- NCES District ID: 0103090

Students and staff
- Students: 1,194
- Teachers: 74.5
- Staff: 99.5
- Student–teacher ratio: 16.03

Other information
- Website: sumter.k12.al.us

Sumter County School District is a school district operating public schools in Sumter County, Alabama; its headquarters are in Livingston.

== History ==
In 1968 the district's student body was 16.4% white. At the time the county had fourteen public schools, three of which were majority white. White people reacted to the Lee v. Macon County Board of Education case. By 1970, Sumter County Schools had been ordered to de facto desegregate through the courts. White families had immediately moved their children to Sumter Academy, a segregation academy, leaving the public schools majority black. A former chairperson of the school board stated that a successful boycott at Livingston Junior High School in 1978 motivated African-Americans to run for the school board, and in 1980 African-Americans gained three of five school board seats, giving them a majority of the school board. That year the student enrollment was 2% white.

In the 2007-2008 school year it had 2,300 students. In 2009 it had 838 high school students, a factor that resulted in it merging its two high schools into one. In 2017 the total enrollment was now 1,500. Eleanor Robinson James, who had retired from being a teacher at Sumter County schools, reported that many parents had placed their children in other counties.

In 2018 the district board attempted to get an injunction against the opening of University Charter School (UCS).

== Schools ==
- Sumter Central High School (unincorporated area)
  - Formed in 2011 by the merger of Sumter County High School and Livingston High School.
- Kinterbish Junior High School - unincorporated area, near Cuba
- Livingston Junior High School (Livingston)
  - In 1978 its student body was majority black. When the school board put a white principal in charge, the black community boycotted the school until a new principal was put in charge six weeks later. It had 580 students in 2016. A 2016 article by Dan Carsen from WBHM described the school as being in poor repair; that year it had a metal detector.
- York West End Junior High School (York)

Former schools:

- Livingston High School
- Sumter County High School - York
- North Sumter Junior High School - near, but not in, the Panola CDP
  - In 2003 there were concerns among parents that the board might close the school. Circa 2018 the State of Alabama education authorities gave the school an "F" rating, making it one of six in the Black Belt region to get this rating. In its final year, the state of Alabama had provided funding for five teachers. In 2018 the Sumter county school board voted to close the school. It had 90 students at the time.
- Bell-Brown Career Tech (Livingston)
- Livingston Lab School - In 1968 all of the teachers were white, and 98.5% of the students were white. It closed by 1970.

== Academic performance ==
Statewide testing ranks the schools in Alabama. Those in the bottom six percent are listed as "failing." As of early 2018, both York West End Junior High School and Sumter Central High School were included in this category.

== Extracurricular activities ==
As of 2016 the district lacked extracurricular programs and did not have any baseball or soccer teams.
