= Livingston High School (Alabama) =

High school in Livingston, Alabama

Coordinates: 32°35′08″N 88°11′14″W

Livingston High School was a senior high school in Livingston, Alabama. It was a part of the Sumter County School District.

The first African-American students were admitted in 1966. In 1968 97.8% of the students were white and 84.3% of the teachers were white. Due to white flight, the percentage of white students dropped to .3% by 1970, as only four white students were enrolled, and about 33% of the teachers were white. Many white students had been placed in Sumter Academy.

The football team had a rivalry with Sumter County High School. The impetus to merge came because of a declining population - the county had a total of 838 students divided between the two high schools in 2009 - as well as the condition of Sumter County High and budget issues. It merged with Sumter County High and became Sumter Central High School in 2011.

== Notable alumni ==
- Bill Oliver, football player, coach
