= Carlos Green Smith =

American academic

Carlos Green Smith (December 18, 1813 – October 14, 1892) was an American educator who served as president of the University of Alabama from 1874 to 1878.

Carlos Green Smith was born on December 18, 1813, to parents James and Elizabeth Julia Green, née Green. He was raised near Lexington, Georgia, and attended the University of Tennessee. Smith joined the faculty upon graduation and taught mathematics. After two years, Smith left Tennessee to enroll at the University of Louisville School of Medicine. Smith ended his medical studies at Louisville to teach at La Grange College in Alabama. At La Grange, Smith taught ancient languages for four years. He then returned to the study of medicine at the University of Pennsylvania, earning his degree in 1847. Smith then taught at the Greene Spring School before moving to the Greene Academy in Huntsville, where he was named headmaster. Smith moved to Courtland, Alabama in 1959 and established his own school. After the Civil War ended, Smith returned to the Greene Academy. Smith assumed the presidency at the University of Alabama in 1874, stepping down in 1878 to lead the predecessor institution to the University of West Alabama, the Livingston Female Academy, as it became the Livingston Normal College. Smith's niece Julia Tutwiler joined the faculty in 1881 and the pair were named co-principals, but Smith later resigned for health reasons. He died on October 14, 1892, in Palatka, Florida.
