= Geiger, Alabama =

- Town
- Location of Geiger in Sumter County, Alabama.
- Coordinates: 32°52′6″N 88°18′21″W
- Country: United States
- State: Alabama
- County: Sumter

Area
  - Total: 0.95 sq mi (2.46 km^{2})
  - Land: 0.95 sq mi (2.45 km^{2})
  - Water: 0.0039 sq mi (0.01 km^{2})
- Elevation: 167 ft (51 m)

Population (2020)
  - Total: 155
  - Density: 164.0/sq mi (63.32/km^{2})
- Time zone: UTC-6 (Central (CST))
  - Summer (DST): UTC-5 (CDT)
- ZIP code: 35459
- Area codes: 205, 659
- FIPS code: 01-29392
- GNIS feature ID: 2406556

Geiger is a town in Sumter County, Alabama, United States. It incorporated in 1912. As of the 2020 census, Geiger had a population of 155.

== Geography ==
According to the U.S. Census Bureau, the town has a total area of 1.0 square mile (2.6 km^{2}), all land.

== Demographics ==
Historical population
Census	Pop.	Note	%±
1920	116		—
1930	121		4.3%
1940	192		58.7%
1950	133		−30.7%
1960	104		−21.8%
1970	120		15.4%
1980	200		66.7%
1990	270		35.0%
2000	161		−40.4%
2010	170		5.6%
2020	155		−8.8%
U.S. Decennial Census; 2013 Estimate

=== 2020 census ===
Geiger town, Alabama – Racial and ethnic composition Note: the US Census treats Hispanic/Latino as an ethnic category. This table excludes Latinos from the racial categories and assigns them to a separate category. Hispanics/Latinos may be of any race.
Race / Ethnicity (NH = Non-Hispanic)	Pop 2010	Pop 2020	% 2010	% 2020
White alone (NH)	42	24	24.71%	15.48%
Black or African American alone (NH)	123	110	72.35%	70.97%
Native American or Alaska Native alone (NH)	0	0	0.00%	0.00%
Asian alone (NH)	0	1	0.00%	0.65%
Pacific Islander alone (NH)	0	0	0.00%	0.00%
Some Other Race alone (NH)	0	0	0.00%	0.00%
Mixed Race or Multi-Racial (NH)	0	5	0.00%	3.23%
Hispanic or Latino (any race)	5	15	2.94%	9.68%
Total	170	155	100.00%	100.00%

As of the 2010 United States census, there were 170 people living in the town. The racial makeup of the town was 72.4% Black and 24.7% White. 2.9% were Hispanic or Latino of any race.

As of the census of 2000, there were 161 people, 56 households, and 40 families residing in 70 housing units in the town. The racial makeup of the town was 29.8% White and 70.2% Black or African American.

There were 56 households, out of which 32% had children under the age of 18 living with them, 45% were married couples living together, 18% had a female householder with no husband present, and 27% were non-families. 23% of all households were made up of individuals, and 14% had someone living alone who was 65 years of age or older. The average household size was 2.9 and the average family size was 3.5.

In the town, the population was spread out, with 30% under the age of 18, 11% from 18 to 24, 23% from 25 to 44, 22% from 45 to 64, and 14% who were 65 years of age or older. The median age was 36 years. For every 100 females, there were approximately 83 males. For every 100 females age 18 and over, there were approximately 90 males.

The median income for a household in the town was $17,917, and the median income for a family was $23,750. Males had a median income of $30,625 versus $10,417 for females. The per capita income for the town was $8,585. About 33% of families and 41% of the population were below the poverty line, including 60% of those under the age of 18 and 33% of those 65 or over.

== Notable people ==
- Jimmie Rodgers, country singer in the early 20th century, known most widely for his rhythmic yodeling
- Bobby Williams, former American football player in the National Football League.
