= Sumter County High School =

Former high school in Sumter County, Alabama

Location
- 902 4th Avenue; York, Alabama 36925; United States
- Coordinates: 32°29′24″N 88°17′38″W

Information
- Type: Public high school
- Established: 1912
- Closed: 2011
- Grades: 9–12
- Colors: Red and white
- Mascot: Wildcats

Alabama Register of Landmarks and Heritage
- Official name: Sumter County High School
- Designated: September 16, 2021

Sumter County High School was a senior high school in York, Alabama. It was a part of the Sumter County School District.

In 1968 the student body was 99.1% white and 90.1% of the teachers were white. Due to white flight, no white students remained by 1970, and about 33% of the teachers were white. Many white students had been placed in Sumter Academy.

The football team had a rivalry with that of Livingston High School. The impetus to merge came because of a declining population - the county had a total of 838 students divided between the two high schools in 2009 - as well as the condition of Sumter County High and budget issues. It merged with Livingston High and became Sumter Central High School in 2011.
