= Sumter Central High School =

High school in Sumter County, Alabama

Coordinates: 32°33′00″N 88°13′44″W

Location
- 13878 U.S. Highway 11; York, (Sumter County), Alabama 36925; United States

Information
- Type: Public high school
- Established: 2011
- Principal: Shannon Miller
- Staff: 18.00 (on an FTE basis)
- Enrollment: 283 (2023-24)
- Student to teacher ratio: 15.72
- Colors: Red, white and black
- Nickname: Jaguars
- Website: Sumter Central High School

Sumter Central High School is a senior high school in an unincorporated area of Sumter County, Alabama, between Livingston and York. It has 85,000 square feet (7,900 m^{2}) of space. It is a part of the Sumter County School District.

The school opened in 2011 as a merger of Livingston High School and Sumter County High School. It initially had 760 students. The impetus to merge came because of a declining population - the county had a total of 838 high school students divided between the two schools in 2009 - as well as the condition of Sumter County High and budget issues.

Sumter Central High School has a predominantly African American student body and most are from economically disadvantaged families.
