= York, Alabama =

City in Alabama, United States

- City
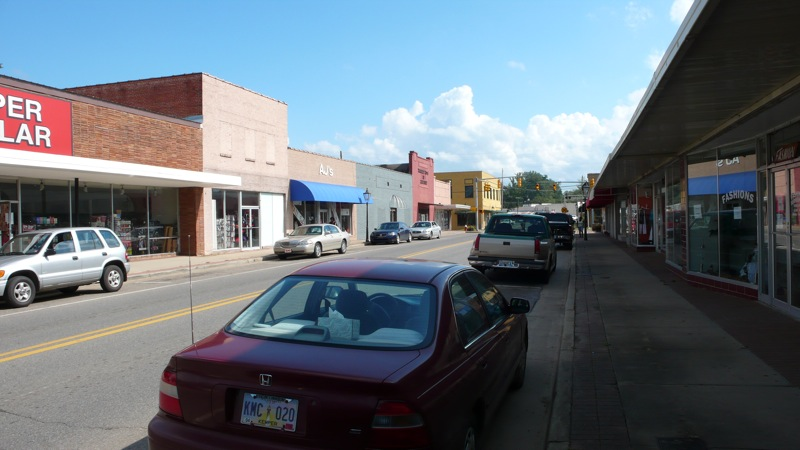
- Downtown York, Alabama

- Flag Seal

- Location of York in Sumter County, Alabama.
- Coordinates: 32°30′16″N 88°17′52″W
- Country: United States
- State: Alabama
- County: Sumter

Area
  - Total: 6.88 sq mi (17.83 km^{2})
  - Land: 6.86 sq mi (17.78 km^{2})
  - Water: 0.019 sq mi (0.05 km^{2})
- Elevation: 207 ft (63 m)

Population (2020)
  - Total: 2,414
  - Density: 351.6/sq mi (135.77/km^{2})
- Time zone: UTC-6 (Central (CST))
  - Summer (DST): UTC-5 (CDT)
- ZIP code: 36925
- Area codes: 205, 659
- FIPS code: 01-84096
- GNIS feature ID: 2405800
- Website: www.cityofyorkal.org

York is a city in Sumter County, Alabama, United States. As of the 2020 census, York had a population of 2,414. From 1920 to 1980, it was the largest town in the county. Since 1990, it has been the second largest city behind the county seat of Livingston.

== History ==
Founded around 1838 after the merging of two communities, Old Anvil and New York Station, the latter a station on a stagecoach line. The rail came through in the 1850s and later, the "New" was dropped from York Station in 1861. With the discovery that another community in Alabama bore that name, the "Station" was dropped and York was formally incorporated on April 6, 1881.

== Geography ==
According to the U.S. Census Bureau, the city has a total area of 7.1 square miles (18 km^{2}), of which 7.1 square miles (18 km^{2}) is land and 0.04 square miles (0.10 km^{2}) (0.28%) is water.

== Demographics ==
Historical population
Census	Pop.	Note	%±
1880	232		—
1890	415		78.9%
1900	528		27.2%
1910	710		34.5%
1920	1,651		132.5%
1930	1,796		8.8%
1940	1,783		−0.7%
1950	1,774		−0.5%
1960	2,932		65.3%
1970	3,044		3.8%
1980	3,392		11.4%
1990	3,160		−6.8%
2000	2,854		−9.7%
2010	2,538		−11.1%
2020	2,414		−4.9%
U.S. Decennial Census; 2013 Estimate

=== 2020 census ===
As of the 2020 census, York had a population of 2,414. The median age was 41.4 years. 24.3% of residents were under the age of 18 and 17.7% of residents were 65 years of age or older. For every 100 females there were 81.5 males, and for every 100 females age 18 and over there were 76.0 males age 18 and over.

0.0% of residents lived in urban areas, while 100.0% lived in rural areas.

There were 1,007 households in York, of which 30.3% had children under the age of 18 living in them. Of all households, 21.6% were married-couple households, 21.2% were households with a male householder and no spouse or partner present, and 51.7% were households with a female householder and no spouse or partner present. About 38.1% of all households were made up of individuals and 14.1% had someone living alone who was 65 years of age or older.

There were 1,202 housing units, of which 16.2% were vacant. The homeowner vacancy rate was 1.7% and the rental vacancy rate was 12.0%.

Racial composition as of the 2020 census
Race	Number	Percent
White	209	8.7%
Black or African American	2,163	89.6%
American Indian and Alaska Native	1	0.0%
Asian	3	0.1%
Native Hawaiian and Other Pacific Islander	0	0.0%
Some other race	1	0.0%
Two or more races	37	1.5%
Hispanic or Latino (of any race)	4	0.2%

=== 2010 census ===
At the 2010 census there were 2,538 people in 1,023 households, including 611 families, in the city. The population density was 357.5 inhabitants per square mile (138.0/km^{2}). There were 1,228 housing units at an average density of 173.0 per square mile (66.8/km^{2}). The racial makeup of the city was 85.3% Black or African American, 13.3% White, 0.2% Native American, <0.1% Asian and 0.2% from two or more races. 1.0% of the population were Hispanic or Latino of any race. Of the 1,023 households 26.5% had children under the age of 18 living with them, 23.8% were married couples living together, 31.1% had a female householder with no husband present, and 40.3% were non-families. 36.9% of households were one person and 14.3% were one person aged 65 or older. The average household size was 2.35 and the average family size was 3.11.

The age distribution was 26.6% under the age of 18, 8.9% from 18 to 24, 21.0% from 25 to 44, 26.1% from 45 to 64, and 17.4% 65 or older. The median age was 38.5 years. For every 100 females, there were 76.9 males. For every 100 females age 18 and over, there were 74.0 males.

The median household income was $19,000 and the median family income was $19,152. Males had a median income of $38,654 versus $22,007 for females. The per capita income for the city was $13,577. About 41.5% of families and 42.7% of the population were below the poverty line, including 63.1% of those under age 18 and 17.4% of those age 65 or over.

=== 2000 census ===
At the 2000 census there were 2,854 people in 1,046 households, including 689 families, in the city. The population density was 403.2 inhabitants per square mile (155.7/km^{2}). There were 1,209 housing units at an average density of 170.8 per square mile (65.9/km^{2}). The racial makeup of the city was 20.71% White, 78.31% Black or African American, 0.07% Native American, 0.07% Asian, 0.04% Pacific Islander, 0.04% from other races, and 0.77% from two or more races. 1.09% of the population were Hispanic or Latino of any race. Of the 1,046 households 33.2% had children under the age of 18 living with them, 33.4% were married couples living together, 28.8% had a female householder with no husband present, and 34.1% were non-families. 31.6% of households were one person and 13.9% were one person aged 65 or older. The average household size was 2.61 and the average family size was 3.34.

The age distribution was 30.4% under the age of 18, 9.1% from 18 to 24, 24.8% from 25 to 44, 18.3% from 45 to 64, and 17.4% 65 or older. The median age was 34 years. For every 100 females, there were 75.6 males. For every 100 females age 18 and over, there were 66.4 males.

The median household income was $19,153 and the median family income was $23,417. Males had a median income of $28,362 versus $15,438 for females. The per capita income for the city was $11,792. About 34.6% of families and 38.1% of the population were below the poverty line, including 50.6% of those under age 18 and 27.5% of those age 65 or over.

== Culture ==
York is home to the Coleman Center for Arts and Culture. The center is known for its artist in residency program, where prominent artists are invited to reside in the town and produce work specific to the town. In 2013, artist Matthew Mazzotta created Open House on a neglected property in the center of York. Open House appears as a small pink house that transforms into a 100-person open-air theatre for public venues.

== Education ==
Sumter County School District operates public schools serving York: York West End Junior High School and Sumter Central High School. It was previously served by Sumter County High School in York until it merged into Sumter Central High in 2011.

Sumter Academy, a private school, was in an unincorporated area near York. It closed in 2017.

== Notable people ==
- Austin Armstrong, American football coach
- Bobby Collins, former NFL player.
- Marko Mitchell, American football wide receiver
- Dale Steele, former American football coach
- Davey Williams, experimental guitarist and improviser
