= University of West Alabama =

Public university in Livingston, Alabama, US

The University of West Alabama
- Former name: List: Livingston Female Academy (1835–1878); Livingston Normal College (1878–1929); Livingston State Teachers College (1929–1957); Livingston State College (1957–1967); Livingston University (1967–1995)
- Motto: "There's something about this place."
- Type: Public university
- Established: 1835; 191 years ago
- Academic affiliations: ACHE, SACS
- President: Todd Fritch
- Provost: Tina Jones
- Faculty: 97
- Students: 5,157
- Location: Livingston, Alabama, U.S. 32.590°N 88.186°W
- Campus: Rural, 600 acres (243 ha)
- Colors: Red & White
- Nickname: Tigers
- Sporting affiliations: NCAA Division II – Gulf South
- Mascot: LUie the Tiger
- Website: uwa.edu
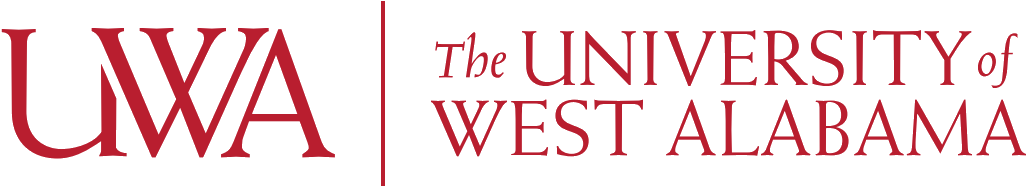

The University of West Alabama (UWA) is a public university in Livingston, Alabama, United States. Founded in 1835, the school began as a church-supported school for young women called "Livingston Female Academy".

The university serves students in several academic colleges and divisions on a 600-acre (2.4 km^{2}) campus in west-central Alabama. UWA offers various degree programs including associate, bachelor's, master's, educational specialist, and educational doctorate degrees.

Its athletics teams, known as the West Alabama Tigers, are members of the Gulf South Conference and compete in NCAA Division II in all sports except the men's and women's rodeo teams who compete in the Ozark Region of the National Intercollegiate Rodeo Association.

== History ==
=== Early history ===
The University of West Alabama began as Livingston Female Academy in 1835. As a church-related female academy, it admitted its first students in 1839. The school was established by Scots-Irish Presbyterians, who controlled the majority of seats on the first board of trustees selected in 1836. The original purpose of the school was to educate future teachers, while also offering course work in art, music, languages, and home economics. Tuition at this time was $20 annually with an additional $25 charged for piano lessons and $10 for French language and embroidery. Jones Hall was the first building constructed on the campus in 1837, and was located near what is now Brock Hall. (The building was lost to fire in the 1890s). On January 15, 1840, state lawmakers incorporated Livingston Female Academy, granted it tax-exempt status, and gave the board the authority to establish rules and regulations.

Livingston Female Academy awarded its first diploma in 1843 to Elizabeth Houston, the daughter of M. L. Houston, a prominent local businessman and a school trustee. The first principal of the school was A. A. Kimbrell, followed by Margaret McShan. In 1853, Robert Dickens Webb arrived in Sumter County and served as a trustee for more than 40 years. He led the school during the American Civil War and Reconstruction through the 1870s, helping to keep the institution open. The main administration building that sits in the middle of campus today is named in his honor.

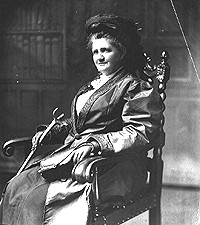
Julia Tutwiler joined the faculty in 1881 as co-principal

In 1878, the institution changed its name to Livingston Normal College. Education reformer Julia Strudwick Tutwiler joined the faculty in 1881 as co-principal with her uncle, Carlos Green Smith, former president of the University of Alabama. In 1882–1883, state lawmakers provided $2,500 for tuition and supplies; Alabama was the first southern state to fund the education of women. Tutwiler and state legislator Addison Gillespie Smith helped secure this appropriation.

In 1883, the school was renamed the Alabama Normal College for Girls and Livingston Female Academy, to better reflect the new mission of the institution, providing students with choices of either two- or four-year programs. "Normal training" was the term used at that time to describe teacher education that represented high school plus two years of college education. The Normal College presented its first diplomas at the 1886 commencement exercises.

In 1890, Tutwiler was named president of the college. She is the only woman to have been president. During her tenure, Tutwiler aided in establishing the Alabama Girls' Industrial Institute (now the University of Montevallo) and in having the first women admitted to the University of Alabama in 1893.

In the early 20th century new leadership brought a new name to the college as well. George William Brock was hired by the trustees in 1907 to oversee the institution's financial affairs. Following Tutwiler's retirement in 1910, Brock assumed the presidency. Alumni began meeting in honor of Tutwiler in 1910 and formed the first alumni association. Men were admitted to the institution as regular students in 1915. Foust Hall was built in 1922 as a lab school where college professors taught, and students observed and participated in classroom instruction. The building's open-air plan with a central courtyard became a building design familiar to many Alabamians. In 1928, both Bibb Graves Hall and Brock Hall were added to the physical plant under this plan.

=== State university ===
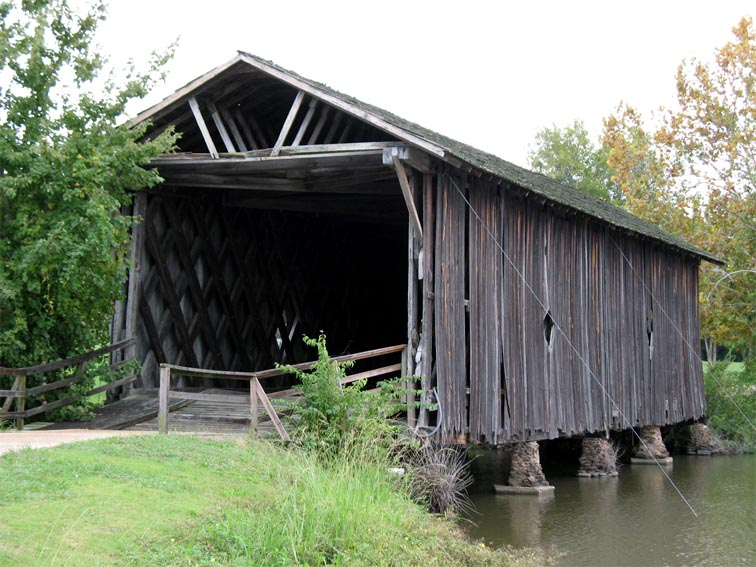
The Alamuchee-Bellamy Covered Bridge on campus

In 1929, the Alabama State Board of Education took over supervision and renamed the facility the Livingston State Teachers College. Under George William Brock, in 1929 the school founded a student newspaper called Campus Lights (now called The Muse).

A football team was added in 1931. With striped uniforms, the college took the tiger as its mascot, and the sports teams continue to be known as the UWA Tigers; red and white are the school colors. After president Brock retired in 1936, Noble Franklin Greenhill took over and served until 1944. Under Greenhill, campus life flourished as social sororities and intercollegiate sports in baseball, basketball, and football were added. The first homecoming celebration was held in 1939.

World War II brought such a decline in enrollment that the college nearly closed. When William Wilson Hill assumed the presidency in 1944 after Greenhill left, he commissioned studies to determine if the institution should continue as a four-year college. Hill began with only 92 students, so he set out to recruit veterans. With more men on campus, the interest in sports was revived, and servicemen were aided financially in going to college by the GI Bill, which increased the educational level of a generation of men. Tiger Stadium was built in 1952. The first campus fraternities were established during Wilson's presidency.

The college gained a reputation for teacher education in the region and state through the 1940s, 1950s, and 1960s. The mission of the institution was broadened in 1957 when, under the leadership of Delos Culp (1954–1963), the school's name was changed to Livingston State College. Graduate-level classes were added, and the state board of education began awarding master's degrees in professional education under a new graduate division. Kelly Hester Land was awarded the first master's degree, and a writing scholarship competition and building are named for her.

Under John E. Deloney (1963–1973), the college had substantial growth, so it expanded its campus, to more than 540 acres (2.2 km^{2}) with a 54-acre (220,000 m^{2}) lake surrounded by nature trails, open to the community as well as college population. In 1967, the U.S. Office of Education approved a grant for the institution to receive campus renovations and updates. During the same year, an act of the Legislature created Livingston University with its own board of trustees. In 1969, a longtime historic landmark in Sumter County, the Alamuchee-Bellamy Covered Bridge (built 1861), was restored and moved on campus by the Sumter County Historical Society. It spans the northeast corner of Duck Pond behind Reed Hall. The number of faculty was increased during Deloney's presidency as well, and the school's colleges and divisions started taking shape.

In 1973, Asa N. Green (1973–1994) became president; he oversaw the establishment of the Ira D. Pruitt School of Nursing and dual-degree programs with Auburn University and the University of Alabama at Birmingham. He worked to establish a consortium of 13 schools to create a marine biology program and the Dauphin Island Sea Lab. More buildings were added and renovated across campus. During the late 1970s, an area was reserved on campus for the construction of Lake LU.

Pre-professional programs were established, and the first Ira D. Pruitt Division of Nursing class earned associate degrees in 1976. Overall, 153 degrees were awarded during commencement exercises in May that same year. In 1977, Ralph M. Lyon, university educator and administrator, retired from his position and was honored for his tenure. His wife presented the university with a handcrafted ceremonial mace in his dedication. The mace is used at yearly commencement exercises. Not long after the 1977 commencement, history professor William E. Gilbert was found dead off campus.

In the early 1980s, a new computer system was installed on campus to support the university's computer information processing systems major. During the 1985–1986 academic year, the university observed its 150th anniversary. After Green resigned, Don C. Hines (1994–1998) became president and brought additional change. The rodeo complex on campus is named in his honor. Among students, Hines is remembered for bringing collegiate rodeo to campus. UWA competes in the Ozark Region and has won regional championships in both the men and women's divisions. In addition, individual competitors have placed nationally in bull riding and barrel racing.

Hines expanded the university’s academic offerings by introducing new programs in psychology and forestry and increasing access to technology by bringing more computers to campus. In 1995, although there was limited support for a name change, the institution opted to adopt a new name—The University of West Alabama—to better reflect its regional educational mission and to dispel the misconception that it was a private school. Ed Roach (1998–2002) assumed the presidency in 1998 and set about integrating technology into every aspect of UWA life. He established the Technology 2000 campaign and helped establish UWA as one of the first Wireless institutions in the region. Women's sports received a boost under his leadership. During this period, the UWA Softball Complex was completed. In February 2002, he stepped down from his position as president. The board of trustees met to choose a replacement on an interim basis from university employees David Taylor, Richard Holland, Roy Underwood, and Clemit Spruiell.

=== Present day ===
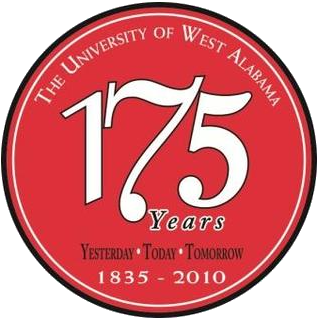
Logo representing the university's 175th anniversary, launched in 2010

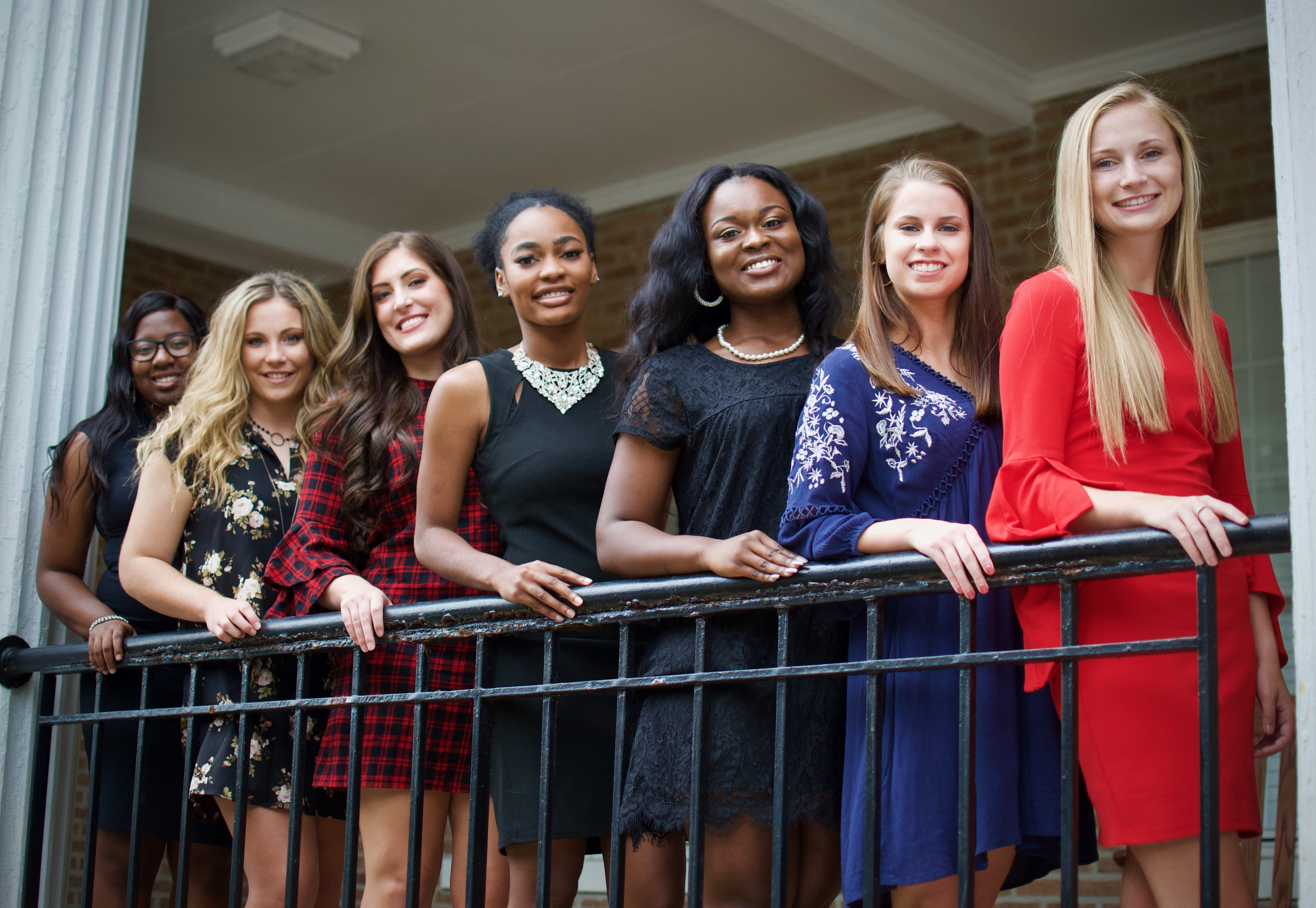
The 2019 Homecoming Court

Richard Holland, an alumnus of the institution and former dean of the College of Natural Sciences and Mathematics, was selected by trustees to take over the position. Six months later, he was named the next university president by a unanimous vote. Holland was the first UWA graduate to serve as president. However, UWA's board of trustees placed him on paid leave and voted to not renew his contract in March 2014 after he challenged the board's review of his performance.

After enrollment hovering around the 2,000 mark for a few years, that number was exceeded in the fall of 2002. In 2005, enrollment reached the 3,000 mark for the first time with a combined 3,090 students on campus and online. That number continued to rise the following year to 3,633 and topped 4,000 in 2007 when 4,186 students were enrolled. When the fall semester rolled around, the university was just shy of the 5,000 mark at 4,888. In 2009, a higher education center was added in neighboring Demopolis. Hines died in 2009.

UWA was temporarily on probation with the Southern Association of Colleges and Schools accreditation body in 2011. It was removed from probation on December 5, 2011.

== Academics ==
UWA offers more than 60 undergraduate programs and 10 graduate programs through its academic colleges and divisions at the bachelor's, master's, educational specialist, and educational doctorate levels. These colleges and divisions include:

- College of Business
- Julia Tutwiler College of Education
- College of Liberal Arts
- College of Natural Sciences and Mathematics
- Division of Online Programs
- Division of Technology
- Ira D. Pruitt School of Nursing
- School of Graduate Studies

Degrees in each academic college and division are awarded at the Bachelor of Arts, Bachelor of Science, Bachelor of Business Administration, Master's degree and Educational specialist levels. Students are awarded an Associate degree from the Ira D. Pruitt School of Nursing. Upon graduation from the University of West Alabama, students may choose to earn a Bachelor's degree in nursing through a partnership with the University of Alabama.

== Campus ==
The University of West Alabama is a single-campus university located in the heart of downtown Livingston on U.S. Highway 11. The campus is on the western border of Alabama. Larger cities close by include Meridian, Tuscaloosa, and Birmingham. The small population in the city of Livingston and Southern hospitality give UWA its small-town atmosphere that many students come to appreciate. The 600-acre (2.4 km^{2}) UWA campus includes nature trails, a 54-acre (220,000 m^{2}) lake, and sculptures. Recent campus beautification projects have enhanced the natural beauty that can be found on campus.

=== Facilities ===
Bibb Graves Hall on the campus of the University of West Alabama

The University of West Alabama campus includes many buildings. Some are used for academic purposes, while others serve different needs. These facilities include the following:

- Math and Science Building, formerly Bibb Graves Hall, houses the College of Natural Sciences and Mathematics, School of Graduate Studies, and Division of Online Programs. In addition to the university's main auditorium, classrooms, laboratories, and faculty offices are located inside.
- Brock Hall contains the Ira D. Pruitt Division of Nursing as well as the Housing Office and Upward Bound Program.
- Lyon Hall hosts the Julia Tutwiler College of Education.
  - University Charter School - Located in Lyon Hall
- Lucille Foust Hall is made up of offices and classrooms for the art department and band hall. Offices for the Athletic Department and Student Success Center also reside in this building.
- Pruitt Hall is the location of the Physical Education and Athletic Training Department. There are a number of classrooms, practice and dressing rooms, and studios.
- The Guy Hunt Technical Education Complex and Hunt Annex is used for the Division of Technology. Both contain instructional spaces and shop facilities as well as classrooms and laboratories. The Early Intervention Center can be found at this building.
- The Julia Tutwiler Library holds the university's books and periodicals in addition to many other resources. Conference rooms and a computer laboratory exist on the first floor. The second floor contains a large collection of books as well as lounge areas and study areas for students.
- Lurleen Burns Wallace Hall provides instruction for a number of subject areas on campus. These range from English and foreign languages, history, and social sciences to speech and theatre. The College of Business and College of Liberal Arts call this building their home.

Other buildings located on campus are listed below:

- The Bell Conference Center can be found in the middle of campus and is host to convocations, luncheons, and special events.
- Kelly Hester Land Hall contains the Division of Educational Research and Department of Continuing Education. The Center for the Study of the Black Belt is located inside this building as well.
- Moon Hall holds a warehouse area for the Physical Plant Department.
- The President's Home is a residence for the university President and his family.
- The George C. Wallace Student Union Building (known as the SUB) provides a number of student activities and recreation. A student weight room is located downstairs next to the campus pool and racketball courts. There is a lounge area, computer lab, conference room, and activity area upstairs. Also located in the building are the university bookstore and campus post office.
- Webb Hall is the primary home of the central administrative offices on campus.
- Young Hall (affectionately referred to as the CAF) houses the campus dining facility and kitchens. A private dining room is used for campus-sponsored special events.
- Alfa Environmental Hall contains the Alabama Onsite Wastewater Training Center.
- The Armory, a retired part of a local army base, contains the university's campus police and UWA campus school. The school offers classrooms and a play area for three- and four-year-olds. Recently, a kindergarten program was added for school-age children.

== Student life ==
Undergraduate demographics as of Fall 2023
Race and ethnicity	Total
White	47%
Black	38%
Unknown	5%
Hispanic	3%
Two or more races	3%
International student	2%
American Indian/Alaska Native	1%
Economic diversity
Low-income (Note: The percentage of students who received an income-based federal Pell grant intended for low-income students.)	50%
Affluent (Note: The percentage of students who are a part of the American middle class at the bare minimum.)	50%

=== Housing life ===
Although the university does not require students to live on campus, UWA strongly encourages students to live in a residence hall their freshman and sophomore years. Research has shown that students who live on campus are much more likely to graduate from college than students who live off-campus. Students who receive a Trustee Scholarship from the university or participate in certain activities such as varsity-level athletics may be required to live on campus.

=== Media and entertainment ===
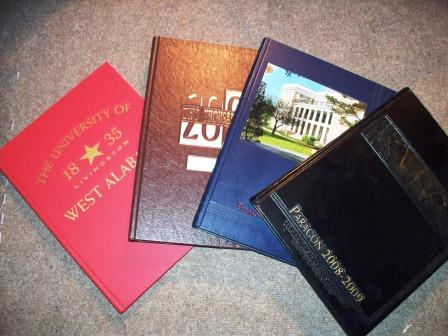
The Paragon 2006–2009 copies

The official student newspaper is Muse. It is published weekly by students and advised by members of the UWA faculty. First published in 1940, the newspaper was called Livingston Life until 1995 when it changed to The Life. This lasted until 2010, when The Life was rebranded into Muse. Students also produce the official University of West Alabama yearbook called The Paragon. Much like the campus newspaper, the yearbook is published by a student staff with a faculty advisor. The Sucarnochee Review is a creative-writing and art journal published by the university's Department of Languages and Literature. The journal got its start on campus in the 1970s. Students serve as staff members for the journal under a faculty advisor and faculty advisory board. Also on campus, the university's theatre program presents two full-length plays each year. These are performed by members of the student body with an advisor during the fall and spring semesters. Finally, the University of West Alabama provides educational video services to the community through Studio 96. The students produce a weekly local news broadcast named TIGER PAUSE which is broadcast on YouTube.

== Student organizations ==
=== Student organizations ===
The University of West Alabama has multiple student organizations and honor societies on its campus for students to join. With over 50 of these on campus, students can choose from a variety to become a member of. There are athletic support groups, governing and programming organizations, musical, religious, and special interest organizations just to name a few. UWA also has quite a number of honor societies in addition to these social organizations.

=== Greek life ===
The University of West Alabama's Greek system comprises 6 fraternities and 7 sororities. Fraternities and sororities take part in a number of philanthropic programs and provide social opportunities for students. Formal rush takes place at the start of every fall semester.

=== IFC fraternities ===
- Delta Chi
- Sigma Pi

=== Panhellenic sororities ===
- Alpha Sigma Alpha
- Alpha Sigma Tau
- Phi Mu

=== National Pan–Hellenic Organizations ===
==== Sororities ====
- Alpha Kappa Alpha
- Delta Sigma Theta
- Zeta Phi Beta
- Sigma Gamma Rho

==== Fraternities ====
- Alpha Phi Alpha
- Kappa Alpha Psi
- Phi Beta Sigma
- Omega Psi Phi

== Athletics and traditions ==
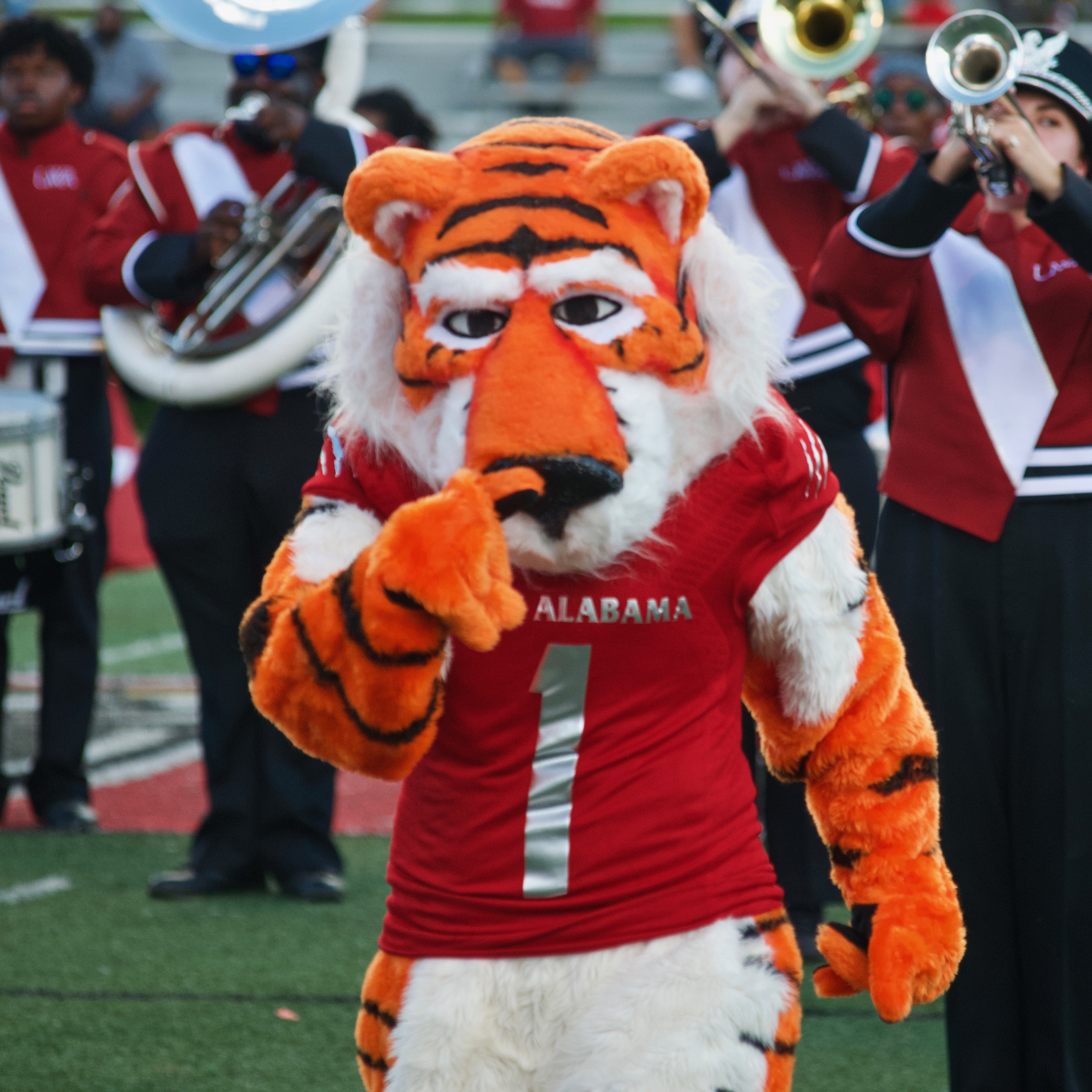
Luie the Tiger

The University of West Alabama has 12 sports teams (13 beginning in 2011–2012 with the addition of women's soccer). Both the male and female athletic teams are called the West Alabama Tigers. Ten of the twelve teams participate in the NCAA's Division II as a member of the Gulf South Conference East Division. Men's and women's rodeo compete in the Ozark Region of the National Intercollegiate Rodeo Association. The NCAA's Division II sports at the University of West Alabama include baseball, basketball, cross country, football, golf, outdoor track, soccer, and tennis for men; basketball, cross country, golf, soccer, softball, tennis, outdoor track, and volleyball for women. The university's official mascot is Luie the Tiger.

As an NAIA member in 1971, the football team won the school's first of two national championships. The other came in 2023 when the school won the women's rodeo national championship. In 1992, the baseball team made history, advancing to their only Division II College World Series. Their chances for the school's first baseball national championship ended in tough luck as they dropped two of three games. In 1997, the Tiger softball program made its only trip to the national tournament and posted a 1–2 record on the campus of Barry University. The men's and women's basketball teams have each made two appearances in the NCAA Tournament. The football team made its first trip to the NCAA Division II Championship since 1975 during the 2009 season. They upset Albany State in the first round before ultimately falling to Carson-Newman in the second round. The 2012 team went undefeated in Gulf South play (5-0) to claim the conference title. UWA defeated Miles College in round one of the playoffs but lost at eventual national champion Valdosta State in the second round. The 2017 Football Team went 9–1 on the season, earning the #1 seed in Super Region 2. They defeated Delta State in the second round before losing to eventual National Runner Up West Florida in the National Quarterfinals. In 2017, the men's soccer team advanced to the Sweet 16 of the NCAA Division II tournament losing to Lynn University.

In addition to varsity sports, the university offers a wide variety of intramural sports programs. Recently, an 18-hole disc golf course was added to the university campus.

== Notable people ==
- Mickey Andrews, college football coach
- Jeff Branson, professional baseball player
- Malcolm Butler, professional football player
- Otha Foster, professional football player
- Jonathan Solofa Fatu Jr and Joshua Samuel Fatu, professional wrestlers
- Eleanor Churchill Gibbs, educator and writer
- Ken Hutcherson, professional football player and pastor
- Deon Lacey, professional football player
- Tyreek Hill, professional football player
- Andrew Killgore, ambassador
- Charles Martin, professional football player
- Buddy Nix, professional football manager
- Kendrick Office, professional football player
- Tanner Rainey, professional baseball player
- Kirsten Reilly, professional soccer player
- Seth Roberts, professional football player
- Stelio Savante, actor
- Johnny Shepherd, professional football player
- Lois Wilson, actress and beauty pageant contestant
