= Sumter Academy =

Segregation academy in Alabama

Location
- York, Alabama; 32°31′56″N 88°15′14″W

Information
- Founded: 1970
- Closed: June 2017
- Faculty: 20
- Enrollment: 170 (2016)
- Website: sumteracademy.org at the Wayback Machine (archive index)

Sumter Academy was a private segregation academy PK-12 school for white students in unincorporated Sumter County, Alabama, near York. It closed in 2017.

== History ==
Sumter was founded in 1970 as a segregation academy. Five hundred students enrolled the first year. White students had been pulled out of public schools of the Sumter County School District.

Sumter attracted the attention of the United States Commission on Civil Rights, prompting an inspection tour in 1982, along with eight other schools in Alabama

In the early 1980s, headmaster Allyn Watts attributed the schools declining enrollment to a decline in anger about the racial desegregation of public schools. Watts wanted to seek nonprofit status to boost fundraising, but Sumter academy board was unwilling to fulfill IRS requirements and recruit minority students.

In the 1990s it had about 400 students. As Sumter County experienced an overall population decline, the school's population also declined. Circa 2015 it had 172 students. In 2016, the school had one Asian student and no Black students enrolled.

As of 2004, Sumter academy had no black faculty, although the headmaster had sought to hire a black teacher to serve as a role model to minority students.

The school board decided to close the school in 2017. Headmaster Glenn Sanders stated that the school closed since it had fewer than 50 students and the school had budgeted for an enrollment of about 110. Joe Nettles, the leader of the football team, stated that chatter about a proposed charter school convinced some prospective families that Sumter Academy was bound to decline and close anyway, so they chose not to enroll their children. Nettles also cited the decision to end the football team, made earlier that month, as it made some prospective families disinterested in the school. University Charter School opened on the campus of the University of West Alabama in 2018.

== Athletics ==
The school had a football team. In 2016 it had 17 members, with most of them being in the junior high school level. The team won one game in the 2016-2017 season. The school decided to end the team in July 2017, shortly before the decision to close the school occurred.

== Culture ==
The mascot was the bald eagle. The alma mater was designed by a committee, and the lyrics and music of the fight song were created by the class of 1985 and its advisor.

Before it closed, Sumter sold an annual subscription to a weekly gun lottery. Each Wednesday, a gun would be given away.
