= Livingston, Alabama =

City in Alabama, United States

- City
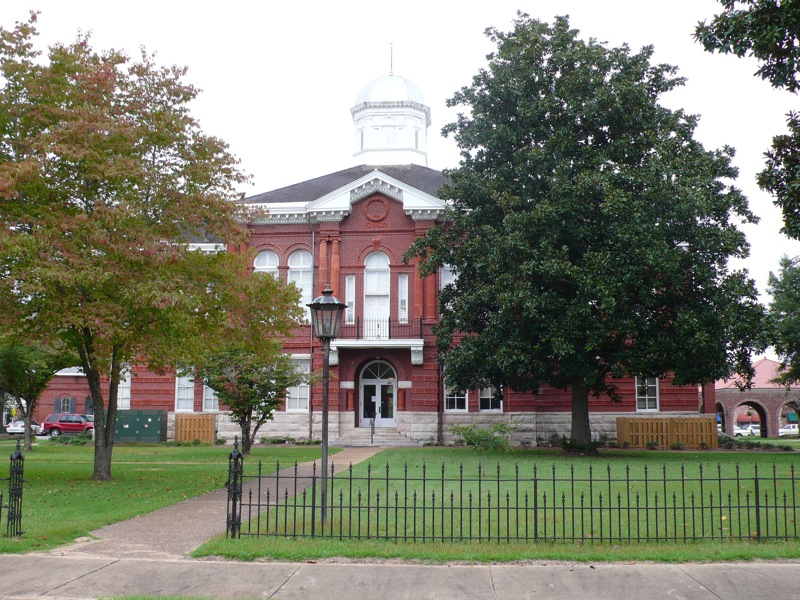
- The Sumter County Courthouse in Livingston, Alabama

- Logo

- Location of Livingston in Sumter County, Alabama.
- Coordinates: 32°36′50″N 88°11′47″W
- Country: United States
- State: Alabama
- County: Sumter

Area
  - Total: 7.21 sq mi (18.68 km^{2})
  - Land: 7.13 sq mi (18.47 km^{2})
  - Water: 0.085 sq mi (0.22 km^{2})
- Elevation: 171 ft (52 m)

Population (2020)
  - Total: 3,436
  - Density: 481.9/sq mi (186.07/km^{2})
- Time zone: UTC-6 (Central (CST))
  - Summer (DST): UTC-5 (CDT)
- ZIP code: 35470
- Area codes: 205, 659
- FIPS code: 01-43720
- GNIS feature ID: 2404942
- Website: cityoflivingstonal.com

Livingston is a city in and the county seat of Sumter County, Alabama, United States and the home of the University of West Alabama. By an act of the state legislature, it was incorporated on January 10, 1835. As of the 2020 census, Livingston had a population of 3,436. It was named in honor of Edward Livingston, of the Livingston family of New York.

== Geography ==
According to the U.S. Census Bureau, the city has a total area of 7.2 square miles (19 km^{2}), of which 7.1 square miles (18 km^{2}) is land and 0.1 square miles (0.26 km^{2}) (1.11%) is water.

=== Climate ===
Climate data for Livingston, Alabama, 1991–2020 normals, extremes 1891–2014
Month	Jan	Feb	Mar	Apr	May	Jun	Jul	Aug	Sep	Oct	Nov	Dec	Year
Record high °F (°C)	91 (33)	89 (32)	90 (32)	95 (35)	99 (37)	105 (41)	106 (41)	106 (41)	103 (39)	99 (37)	88 (31)	90 (32)	106 (41)
Mean maximum °F (°C)	74.5 (23.6)	78.6 (25.9)	84.0 (28.9)	86.9 (30.5)	91.3 (32.9)	96.0 (35.6)	98.1 (36.7)	97.6 (36.4)	94.4 (34.7)	89.0 (31.7)	82.1 (27.8)	76.2 (24.6)	99.7 (37.6)
Mean daily maximum °F (°C)	57.4 (14.1)	62.7 (17.1)	70.3 (21.3)	77.0 (25.0)	83.6 (28.7)	89.3 (31.8)	91.5 (33.1)	92.0 (33.3)	86.9 (30.5)	78.2 (25.7)	66.7 (19.3)	59.4 (15.2)	76.3 (24.6)
Daily mean °F (°C)	45.5 (7.5)	49.4 (9.7)	56.8 (13.8)	63.6 (17.6)	71.5 (21.9)	78.7 (25.9)	81.0 (27.2)	81.0 (27.2)	75.4 (24.1)	64.9 (18.3)	53.6 (12.0)	47.1 (8.4)	64.0 (17.8)
Mean daily minimum °F (°C)	33.7 (0.9)	36.0 (2.2)	43.3 (6.3)	50.2 (10.1)	59.3 (15.2)	68.1 (20.1)	70.5 (21.4)	70.0 (21.1)	63.8 (17.7)	51.7 (10.9)	40.5 (4.7)	34.9 (1.6)	51.8 (11.0)
Mean minimum °F (°C)	15.9 (−8.9)	20.1 (−6.6)	25.9 (−3.4)	33.8 (1.0)	43.5 (6.4)	56.2 (13.4)	63.4 (17.4)	61.6 (16.4)	48.8 (9.3)	34.0 (1.1)	25.4 (−3.7)	18.4 (−7.6)	12.5 (−10.8)
Record low °F (°C)	−5 (−21)	5 (−15)	14 (−10)	24 (−4)	31 (−1)	42 (6)	51 (11)	52 (11)	35 (2)	24 (−4)	13 (−11)	2 (−17)	−5 (−21)
Average precipitation inches (mm)	5.24 (133)	5.32 (135)	5.00 (127)	4.52 (115)	4.92 (125)	4.48 (114)	5.43 (138)	4.51 (115)	3.24 (82)	3.73 (95)	4.83 (123)	4.86 (123)	56.08 (1,425)
Average snowfall inches (cm)	0.1 (0.25)	0.0 (0.0)	0.2 (0.51)	0.1 (0.25)	0.0 (0.0)	0.0 (0.0)	0.0 (0.0)	0.0 (0.0)	0.0 (0.0)	0.0 (0.0)	0.0 (0.0)	0.0 (0.0)	0.4 (1.01)
Average precipitation days (≥ 0.01 in)	7.7	6.7	7.3	6.4	6.3	7.5	8.4	6.8	5.4	4.8	5.9	7.5	80.7
Average snowy days (≥ 0.1 in)	0.1	0.0	0.0	0.1	0.0	0.0	0.0	0.0	0.0	0.0	0.0	0.0	0.2
Source 1: NOAA (precip/precip days, snow/snow days 1981–2010)
Source 2: National Weather Service (mean maxima/minima 1981–2010)

== Demographics ==
Historical population
Census	Pop.	Note	%±
1870	500		—
1880	738		47.6%
1890	850		15.2%
1900	851		0.1%
1910	877		3.1%
1920	968		10.4%
1930	1,072		10.7%
1940	1,170		9.1%
1950	1,681		43.7%
1960	1,544		−8.1%
1970	2,358		52.7%
1980	3,187		35.2%
1990	3,530		10.8%
2000	3,297		−6.6%
2010	3,485		5.7%
2020	3,436		−1.4%
U.S. Decennial Census; 2013 Estimate

=== 2020 census ===
As of the 2020 census, Livingston had a population of 3,436. The median age was 23.1 years. 16.3% of residents were under the age of 18 and 11.5% of residents were 65 years of age or older. For every 100 females there were 80.1 males, and for every 100 females age 18 and over there were 76.6 males age 18 and over.

0.0% of residents lived in urban areas, while 100.0% lived in rural areas.

There were 1,117 households and 592 families in Livingston, of which 31.7% had children under the age of 18 living in them. Of all households, 27.2% were married-couple households, 21.5% were households with a male householder and no spouse or partner present, and 46.6% were households with a female householder and no spouse or partner present. About 36.6% of all households were made up of individuals and 13.3% had someone living alone who was 65 years of age or older.

There were 1,350 housing units, of which 17.3% were vacant. The homeowner vacancy rate was 2.0% and the rental vacancy rate was 17.8%.

Racial composition as of the 2020 census
Race	Number	Percent
White	1,202	35.0%
Black or African American	2,034	59.2%
American Indian and Alaska Native	20	0.6%
Asian	96	2.8%
Native Hawaiian and Other Pacific Islander	1	0.0%
Some other race	15	0.4%
Two or more races	68	2.0%
Hispanic or Latino (of any race)	78	2.3%

=== 2010 census ===
As of the 2010 United States census, there were 3,485 people living in the city. 63.8% were African American, 34.4% White, 0.1% Native American, 0.3% Asian, <0.1% Pacific Islander and 0.6% of two more races. 0.7% were Hispanic or Latino of any race.

=== 2000 census ===
As of the census of 2000, there were 3,297 people, 1,368 households, and 731 families living in the city. The population density was 463.1 inhabitants per square mile (178.8/km^{2}). There were 1,586 housing units at an average density of 222.8 per square mile (86.0/km^{2}). The racial makeup of the city was 60.78% Black or African American, 37.82% White or Caucasian, 0.18% Asian, 0.15% Native American, 0.30% from other races, and 0.76% from two or more races. 1.43% of the population were Hispanic or Latino of any race.

Of the 1,368 households, 29.4% had children under the age of 18 living with them, 30.0% were married couples living together, 20.2% had a female householder with no husband present, and 46.5% were non-families. 35.5% of all households were made up of individuals, and 10.8% had someone living alone who was 65 years of age or older. The average household size was 2.31 and the average family size was 3.14.

In the city, the population was spread out, with 26.2% under the age of 18, 23.7% from 18 to 24, 24.2% from 25 to 44, 16.5% from 45 to 64, and 9.4% over the age of 65. The median age was 25 years. For every 100 females, there were 85.9 males. For every 100 females aged 18 and higher, there were 78.0 males.

The median income for a household in the city was $13,516, and the median income for a family was $22,500. Males had a median income of $31,838 as opposed to $20,833 for females. The per capita income for the city was $11,640. About 39.4% of families and 46.1% of the population were below the poverty line, including 53.4% of those under age 18 and 26.0% of those aged 65 years or more.

== History ==
The area now known as Livingston was part of the traditional territory of the nation of Choctaw Indians until the Treaty of Dancing Rabbit Creek in 1830. The federal government removed most of the Choctaw to Indian Territory in present-day Oklahoma. At that time, settlers from the Carolinas, Georgia, Tennessee, and Virginia established the first European-American community about two blocks from the current Courthouse Square, near the corner of Madison and Spring Streets.

In 1833, a commission was formed to organize Sumter County. Livingston was named after a well-known statesman and jurist of the day, Edward Livingston. Livingston was chosen as the county seat. Soon followed the first newspaper, The Voice of Sumter; four schools (including Livingston Female Academy, now The University of West Alabama), the courthouse, and the Bored Well.

The first courthouse was built of logs. It was replaced by a frame courthouse in 1839, which burned in 1901. The Probate Judge's office, built at the same time, survived the fire. It now houses the county commission office.

In the latter part of the nineteenth century, Livingston became widely known as a health spa because of the water from its Bored Well, one of many that made extensive settlement possible in the Black Belt. This well was bored by an old blind mule that pulled an auger around until an artesian aquifer was reached in 1857. Promoters built a Chinese-styled pagoda over the well. In 1924 the pagoda was replaced by the predecessor to the present pavilion.

During the early part of the twentieth century, Livingston continued to be known as a health resort. It was also the site of the Alabama Normal School, which developed from the Livingston Female Academy and was established to train teachers for the public school system founded during the Reconstruction era. Reflecting its expanding programs and level of curriculum, the name of the college was later changed to the State Teachers College, then to Livingston State College, Livingston University and finally to The University of West Alabama.

Livingston continued as the sleepy county seat of a mainly rural county, with a declining population. In the early 1960s, citizens made an effort to revitalize the town, building on their historic heritage and main street. The results were a near doubling in population in ten years, and corresponding increase in industry and businesses. In 1972 Livingston was named a finalist in the "All American Cities Competition", sponsored by The Saturday Evening Post.

=== Historic sites ===
Livingston has a number of historic sites and properties. Lakewood (1840) is a historic antebellum mansion occupied by Julia Tutwiler while she was president of Livingston Normal College. The Sumter County Courthouse (1902) is listed on the National Register of Historic Places. Additionally, the Branch-Stuart Home (1903), Inge-Moon House (1834), St. James Episcopal Church (1840), and Voss-Pate House (1850) are all listed on the Alabama Register of Landmarks and Heritage.

== Education ==
University of West Alabama is in Livingston.

Sumter County School District operates public schools serving Livingston: Livingston Junior High School and Sumter Central High School. It was previously served by Livingston High School until it merged into Sumter Central High in 2011. In addition there is a charter school on the campus of the University of West Alabama in Livingston, University Charter School.

Sumter Academy, a private school, was in an unincorporated area near York. It closed in 2017.

== Notable people ==
- Richard Arrington, Jr., first African American mayor of Birmingham, Alabama
- Mario Austin, professional basketball player
- Willis Brewer, former U.S. Representative from Alabama
- Nathan Elams Cockrell, a founder of Sigma Alpha Epsilon fraternity
- Eleanor Churchill Gibbs, educator
- Vera Hall, folk singer
- Ken Hutcherson, NFL player for four teams
- Samuel Williams Inge, former U.S. Congressman for the 4th District of Alabama and former Chairman of the Committee on the District of Columbia
- Bob Simmons, head coach at Oklahoma State from 1995 to 2000
- Willie Williams, African American USMC general, born in Livingston
