= Sumter County, Alabama =

County in Alabama, United States

- County
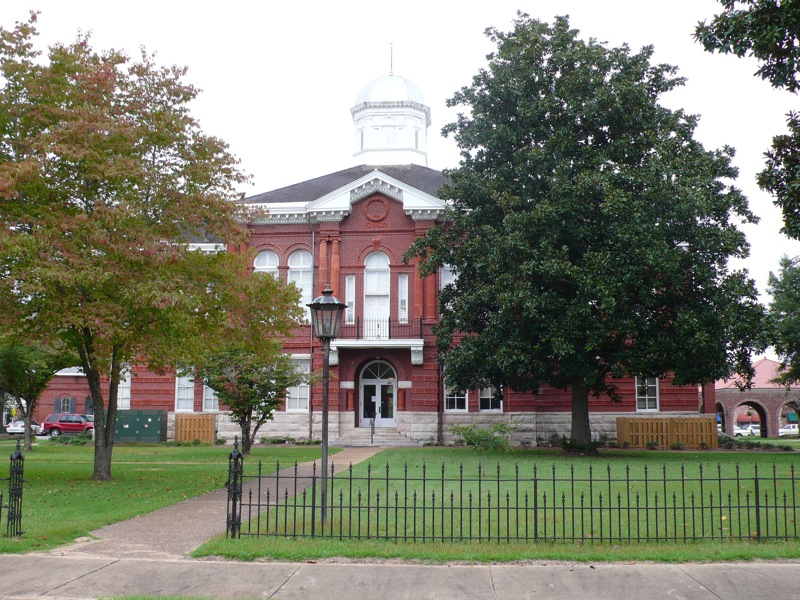
- Sumter County Courthouse in Livingston

- Seal

- Location within the U.S. state of Alabama
- Coordinates: 32°35′30″N 88°12′15″W
- Country: United States
- State: Alabama
- Founded: December 18, 1832
- Named for: Thomas Sumter
- Seat: Livingston
- Largest city: Livingston

Area
  - Total: 913 sq mi (2,360 km^{2})
  - Land: 904 sq mi (2,340 km^{2})
  - Water: 9.4 sq mi (24 km^{2}) 1.0%

Population (2020)
  - Total: 12,345
  - Estimate (2025): 11,588 ▼
  - Density: 13.7/sq mi (5.27/km^{2})
- Time zone: UTC−6 (Central)
  - Summer (DST): UTC−5 (CDT)
- Congressional district: 7th
- Website: sumtercountyal.com
- County Number 60 on Alabama License Plates

Sumter County is a county located in the west central portion of Alabama. At the 2020 census, the population was 12,345. Its county seat is Livingston. Its name is in honor of General Thomas Sumter of South Carolina. The University of West Alabama is in Livingston.

== History ==
Sumter County was established on December 18, 1832. From 1797 to 1832, Sumter County was part of the Choctaw Nation, which was made up of four main villages. The first settlers in Sumter County were French explorers who had come north from Mobile. They built and settled at Fort Tombecbee, near the modern-day town of Epes. In 1830, with the Treaty of Dancing Rabbit Creek, the Choctaw Indians ceded the land that is now Sumter County to the government.

== Geography ==
According to the United States Census Bureau, the county has a total area of 913 square miles (2,360 km^{2}), of which 904 square miles (2,340 km^{2}) is land and 9.4 square miles (24 km^{2}) (1.0%) is covered by water. It is intersected by the Noxubee River.

=== Major highways ===
- Interstate 20 / Interstate 59
- U.S. Route 11 / State Route 7 (unsigned)
- U.S. Route 80 / State Route 8 (unsigned)
- State Route 17
- State Route 28
- State Route 39
- State Route 116

=== Adjacent counties ===
- Pickens County (north)
- Greene County (northeast)
- Marengo County (southeast)
- Choctaw County (south)
- Lauderdale County, Mississippi (southwest)
- Kemper County, Mississippi (west)
- Noxubee County, Mississippi (northwest)

== Demographics ==
Historical population
Census	Pop.	Note	%±
1840	29,937		—
1850	22,250		−25.7%
1860	24,035		8.0%
1870	24,109		0.3%
1880	28,728		19.2%
1890	29,574		2.9%
1900	32,710		10.6%
1910	28,699		−12.3%
1920	25,569		−10.9%
1930	26,929		5.3%
1940	27,321		1.5%
1950	23,610		−13.6%
1960	20,041		−15.1%
1970	16,974		−15.3%
1980	16,908		−0.4%
1990	16,174		−4.3%
2000	14,798		−8.5%
2010	13,763		−7.0%
2020	12,345		−10.3%
2025 (est.)	11,588	▼	−6.1%
U.S. Decennial Census; 1790–1960 1900–1990; 1990–2000 2010–2020

=== 2020 census ===
As of the 2020 census, the county had a population of 12,345. The median age was 39.3 years. 19.7% of residents were under the age of 18 and 18.8% of residents were 65 years of age or older. For every 100 females there were 85.0 males, and for every 100 females age 18 and over there were 81.1 males age 18 and over.

The racial makeup of the county was 24.1% White, 72.9% Black or African American, 0.2% American Indian and Alaska Native, 0.8% Asian, 0.0% Native Hawaiian and Pacific Islander, 0.2% from some other race, and 1.7% from two or more races. Hispanic or Latino residents of any race comprised 1.1% of the population.

0.0% of residents lived in urban areas, while 100.0% lived in rural areas.

There were 5,020 households in the county, of which 27.1% had children under the age of 18 living with them and 44.1% had a female householder with no spouse or partner present. About 37.3% of all households were made up of individuals and 15.2% had someone living alone who was 65 years of age or older.

There were 6,279 housing units, of which 20.1% were vacant. Among occupied housing units, 67.6% were owner-occupied and 32.4% were renter-occupied. The homeowner vacancy rate was 1.1% and the rental vacancy rate was 15.0%.

=== Racial and ethnic composition ===
Sumter County, Alabama – Racial and ethnic composition Note: the US Census treats Hispanic/Latino as an ethnic category. This table excludes Latinos from the racial categories and assigns them to a separate category. Hispanics/Latinos may be of any race.
Race / Ethnicity (NH = Non-Hispanic)	Pop 2000	Pop 2010	Pop 2020	% 2000	% 2010	% 2020
White alone (NH)	3,813	3,304	2,937	25.77%	24.01%	23.79%
Black or African American alone (NH)	10,718	10,283	8,955	72.43%	74.71%	72.54%
Native American or Alaska Native alone (NH)	14	11	26	0.09%	0.08%	0.21%
Asian alone (NH)	15	33	102	0.10%	0.24%	0.83%
Pacific Islander alone (NH)	2	1	3	0.01%	0.01%	0.02%
Other race alone (NH)	1	0	9	0.01%	0.00%	0.07%
Mixed race or Multiracial (NH)	70	45	182	0.47%	0.33%	1.47%
Hispanic or Latino (any race)	165	86	131	1.12%	0.62%	1.06%
Total	14,798	13,763	12,345	100.00%	100.00%	100.00%

=== 2010 census ===
As of the census of 2010, 13,763 people resided in the county. About 75.0% were Black or African American, 24.2% White, 0.2% Asian, 0.1% Native American, 0.2% of some other race, and 0.3% of two or more races; 0.6% were Hispanic or Latino (of any race).

=== 2000 census ===
As of the census of 2000, 14,798 people, 5,708 households and 3,664 families resided there. The population density was 16 people per square mile (6.2 people/km^{2}). The 6,953 housing units averaged 8 units per square mile (3.1 units/km^{2}). The racial make-up was 25.92% White, 73.17% Black or African American, 0.09% Native American, 0.10% Asian, 0.01% Pacific Islander, 0.18% from other races and 0.52% from two or more races. Nearly 1.12% of the population was Hispanic or Latino.

Of the 5,708 households, 31.90% had children under the age of 18 living with them, 36.70% were married couples living together, 23.50% had a female householder with no husband present, and 35.80% were not families. About 31.20% of all households were made up of individuals, and 12.30% had someone living alone who was 65 years of age or older. The average household size was 2.55, and the average family size was 3.26.

29.10% of the population were under the age of 18, 12.20% from 18 to 24, 25.30% from 25 to 44, 19.50% from 45 to 64, and 13.90% who were 65 years of age or older. The median age was 32 years. For every 100 females, there were 84.90 males. For every 100 females age 18 and over, there were 78.20 males.

The median household income was $18,911 and the median family income was $23,176. Males had a median income of $28,059 and females $17,574. The per capita income was $11,491. About 32.90% of families and 38.70% of the population were below the poverty line, including 47.40% of those under age 18 and 36.10% of those age 65 or over.

== Economy ==
Sumter County is part of the Black Belt region of central Alabama. The region has suffered significant economic depression in recent years, but in April 2008, United States Steel announced plans to build at $150 million alloy plant near the community of Epes about 50 miles (80 km) southwest of Tuscaloosa, Alabama.

The plant would require 250 workers to construct in a town of only 206. Up to 235 full-time jobs would be created when completed, with jobs paying about $50,000 annually. The state of Alabama offered $28 million in incentives to get the plant located in Sumter County. The plant would make use of a new technology that produces a carbon alloy for use in steel making at the U.S. Steel plant in Fairfield, Alabama near Birmingham. At the time of the announcement, the unemployment rate in Sumter County was 6.1%.

In November 2008, U.S. Steel spokesman D. John Armstrong announced that plans to build the Epes facility had been placed on hold. “We’ve adjusted the timing of it, and we don’t know what the new timeline will be,” he said. “We’ve delayed construction, but we have not cancelled it.“

To date, the Epes facility has not been built.

From 2009 to 2013, the county had a median household income of $22,186 compared to a state figure of $45,253, making it the poorest county in the state. By 2015, Sumter County remained the poorest county in Alabama, with a median household income of $19,501 in comparison to the state median household income of $43,623.

== Education ==
=== Colleges and universities ===
The University of West Alabama is in Livingston.

=== Primary and secondary schools ===
The school district serving the county is Sumter County School District. In addition, a charter school is located on the campus of the University of West Alabama, University Charter School.

Until 2017, all schools in Sumter County were in practice entirely racially segregated, as white parents sent their children to Sumter Academy, a private segregation academy set up in 1970 in the wake of a federal court ruling ordering the school district to desegregate. During the 2015–16 school year, 98% of the 1,593 students in county's public schools were black, while none of the 170 students at Sumter Academy were black. However, Sumter Academy closed in June 2017, while in August 2018, University Charter School opened, with a half-black, half-white enrollment, making it the county's first practically desegregated school.

== Government ==
United States presidential election results for Sumter County, Alabama
Year	Republican		Democratic		Third party(ies)	
Year	No.	%	No.	%	No.	%
1836	789	55.56%	631	44.44%	0	0.00%
1840	1,308	52.57%	1,180	47.43%	0	0.00%
1844	927	46.63%	1,061	53.37%	0	0.00%
1848	820	51.54%	771	48.46%	0	0.00%
1852	482	49.03%	497	50.56%	4	0.41%
1856	0	0.00%	703	56.92%	532	43.08%
1860	0	0.00%	136	10.53%	1,155	89.47%
1868	2,516	63.14%	1,469	36.86%	0	0.00%
1872	2,491	60.15%	1,650	39.85%	0	0.00%
1876	1,370	38.01%	2,234	61.99%	0	0.00%
1880	1,337	42.80%	1,787	57.20%	0	0.00%
1884	963	38.61%	1,525	61.15%	6	0.24%
1888	819	28.34%	2,060	71.28%	11	0.38%
1892	781	19.40%	3,185	79.11%	60	1.49%
1896	1,459	41.72%	1,834	52.44%	204	5.83%
1900	204	15.93%	1,053	82.20%	24	1.87%
1904	16	1.77%	883	97.46%	7	0.77%
1908	3	0.41%	719	98.76%	6	0.82%
1912	9	1.25%	701	97.09%	12	1.66%
1916	8	1.02%	770	98.21%	6	0.77%
1920	15	1.36%	1,088	98.37%	3	0.27%
1924	28	3.17%	837	94.68%	19	2.15%
1928	191	15.84%	1,015	84.16%	0	0.00%
1932	26	1.97%	1,293	98.03%	0	0.00%
1936	24	1.72%	1,369	98.28%	0	0.00%
1940	46	3.17%	1,404	96.76%	1	0.07%
1944	53	4.69%	1,075	95.05%	3	0.27%
1948	52	4.67%	0	0.00%	1,061	95.33%
1952	702	43.90%	894	55.91%	3	0.19%
1956	578	34.59%	981	58.71%	112	6.70%
1960	623	42.61%	765	52.33%	74	5.06%
1964	1,653	80.32%	0	0.00%	405	19.68%
1968	303	6.30%	2,336	48.60%	2,168	45.10%
1972	2,686	49.19%	2,737	50.12%	38	0.70%
1976	2,191	38.51%	3,457	60.77%	41	0.72%
1980	2,104	29.23%	5,015	69.66%	80	1.11%
1984	2,493	35.65%	4,478	64.04%	22	0.31%
1988	2,212	33.36%	4,390	66.21%	28	0.42%
1992	1,807	25.72%	4,810	68.47%	408	5.81%
1996	1,561	24.18%	4,706	72.89%	189	2.93%
2000	1,629	26.76%	4,415	72.52%	44	0.72%
2004	1,880	29.22%	4,527	70.37%	26	0.40%
2008	1,731	24.66%	5,264	74.99%	25	0.36%
2012	1,586	22.56%	5,421	77.11%	23	0.33%
2016	1,581	24.66%	4,746	74.03%	84	1.31%
2020	1,598	25.40%	4,648	73.88%	45	0.72%
2024	1,542	29.06%	3,725	70.19%	40	0.75%

United States Senate election results for Sumter County, Alabama2
Year	Republican		Democratic		Third party(ies)	
Year	No.	%	No.	%	No.	%
2020	1,550	24.77%	4,705	75.18%	3	0.05%

United States Senate election results for Sumter County, Alabama3
Year	Republican		Democratic		Third party(ies)	
Year	No.	%	No.	%	No.	%
2022	1,163	30.01%	2,684	69.25%	29	0.75%

Alabama Gubernatorial election results for Sumter County
Year	Republican		Democratic		Third party(ies)	
Year	No.	%	No.	%	No.	%
2022	1,176	30.28%	2,656	68.38%	52	1.34%

Sumter County has a high African American population and has been solidly Democratic since 1872. The only exception to this was when it voted for Barry Goldwater in 1964. In the 21st Century, Democrats have won the county with over 70% in every presidential election.

== Communities ==
=== Cities ===
- Livingston (county seat)
- York

=== Towns ===
- Cuba
- Emelle
- Epes
- Gainesville
- Geiger

=== Census-designated places ===
- Bellamy
- Panola

=== Unincorporated communities ===
- Belmont
- Coatopa
- Intercourse
- Payneville
- Sumterville
- Ward
- Warsaw

== Places of interest ==
Sumter County is home to the University of West Alabama Outdoor Sculpture Exhibition in Livingston and the Coleman Center for the Arts in York, Alabama. The historic Alamuchee-Bellamy Covered Bridge is also located on the University of West Alabama campus.

== Notable residents ==
- Austin Armstrong (born 1993), football coach, born and raised in York, Alabama
- Jaybird Coleman (1896–1950), country blues harmonica player, vocalist, and guitarist
- Mentor Dotson (c. 1837–?), Black state legislator who represented Sumter County, Alabama in the Alabama House of Representatives from 1872–1874
- Maria Fearing (1838–1937), Black educator and Presbyterian missionary to Congo, who was born on Winston's Oak Hill Plantation in Sumter County
- Carol Forman (1919–1997), actress
- Amelia Greenwald, International nurse, and first female driver in Poland
- Lena King Lee (1906–2006), Black educator, attorney, and politician; the first Black women elected to the Maryland General Assembly

== See also ==
- National Register of Historic Places listings in Sumter County, Alabama
- Properties on the Alabama Register of Landmarks and Heritage in Sumter County, Alabama
