= National Register of Historic Places listings in Tallapoosa County, Alabama =

Location of Tallapoosa County in Alabama

This is a list of the National Register of Historic Places listings in Tallapoosa County, Alabama.

This is intended to be a complete list of the properties and districts on the National Register of Historic Places in Tallapoosa County, Alabama, United States. Latitude and longitude coordinates are provided for many National Register properties and districts; these locations may be seen together in a Google map.

There are nine properties and districts listed on the National Register in the county.

This National Park Service list is complete through NPS recent listings posted January 30, 2026.

	Name on the Register	Image	Date listed	Location	City or town	Description
1	Alexander City Commercial Historic District	Alexander City Commercial Historic District	June 22, 2000 (#00000711)	Portions of Broad, Main, Green, Alabama, and Jefferson Sts., and Courthouse Sq. 32°56′44″N 85°57′14″W	Alexander City	
2	Avondale Historic District	Avondale Historic District	August 9, 2005 (#05000837)	Between Rose Ave. and Scott St., and Hillabee St. and 7th St. 32°56′24″N 85°56′28″W	Alexander City	Avondale Mills closed in 2006 and is now known as Parkdale Mills.
3	A.J. and Emma E. Thomas Coley House	A.J. and Emma E. Thomas Coley House	January 3, 1991 (#90002109)	455 Hillabee St. 32°56′51″N 85°56′55″W	Alexander City	
4	Dadeville Historic District	Dadeville Historic District	July 10, 2013 (#13000471)	Lafayette, East, South, S. Tallassee & West Sts. 32°49′53″N 85°45′49″W	Dadeville	
5	Reuben Herzfeld House	Reuben Herzfeld House	August 22, 1995 (#95001023)	497 Hillabee St. 32°56′51″N 85°56′53″W	Alexander City	Built in 1890, the house is also known as the Mistletoe Bough Bed & Breakfast.
6	Horseshoe Bend National Military Park	Horseshoe Bend National Military Park	October 15, 1966 (#66000060)	Tallapoosa River, 12 miles north of Dadeville on State Route 49; 32°58′15″N 85°44′18″W	Dadeville	
7	North Central Historic District	North Central Historic District	August 11, 2005 (#05000833)	Between Hall and Summer, Warren and Hillabee, Warren and Ridgeway, and MLK and Hillabee; 32°57′31″N 85°57′32″W	Alexander City	800 acres (3.2 km^{2}) historic district including 349 contributing buildings
8	Russell Family Historic District	Russell Family Historic District	March 21, 2006 (#05000839)	35, 65, and 85 N. Central, 228 and 334 Robin Hill, and 101 Russwood; 32°56′36″N 85°57′43″W	Alexander City	
9	South Central Historic District	South Central Historic District	August 9, 2005 (#05000840)	Bounded by Broad St., Tallpoosa St., Cherokee Rd., Bishop St., Franklin St., and Willow St. 32°56′07″N 85°57′03″W	Alexander City	About 200 acres (0.81 km^{2}) area with 137 contributing resources, just south of Alexander City's downtown core.

== See also ==
- List of National Historic Landmarks in Alabama
- National Register of Historic Places listings in Alabama
