= Malcolm Simmons =

Malcolm Simmons may refer to:

- Malcolm Simmons (speedway rider), (1946–2014) English motorcycle speedway racer
- Malcolm Simmons (soccer), (born 2003) Canadian soccer player
- Malcolm Simmons (American football), college football player
