= Benjamin Russell High School =

Location
- 747 Barbara H. Young Drive; Alexander City, Alabama, Tallapoosa 35010; 32.9378°N 85.9508°W

Information
- School type: Public
- Established: 1950
- School district: Alexander City Schools
- NCES District ID: 0100030
- Superintendent: Jose Reyes Jr.
- NCES School ID: 010003000003
- Principal: Shannon Benefield
- Staff: 82
- Teaching staff: 51
- Grades: 9-12
- Enrollment: 843 (2023-2024)
- Student to teacher ratio: 16.53
- Colors: Maroon and Grey
- Mascot: Wildcat
- Website: https://brhs.alexcityschools.net/

Benjamin Russell High School is in Alexander City, Alabama. It is part of Alexander City Schools. It is at 747 Barbara H. Young Drive. In 2025, a new high school building was constructed. The school is named for an entrepreneur whose businesses include Russell Athletic.

In 2025 it had 813 students in grades 9 to 12. It had 16 sports teams and 19 clubs. Wildcats are the school's mascot.

The student body is about 40 percent white and black and 11 percent hispanic.

== History ==
The school was first established in 1950. In 1960, a $285,000 auditorium was built as part of a $100 million school construction bond issue. Black students attended Laurel High School until it merged with Russell in 1971.

In 1971, the school received national attention after students created an informal business called "spook insurance." Homeowners would pay the students a fee of $1.00 for free cleanup services if their houses were vandalized on Halloween. The school was racially integrated following the merger of two other high schools that same year.

== Athletics ==
Kirk Johnson is the football team's coach since 2025. Danny Horn coached the team from 2009 to 2018 before moving on to Clay County High School where he won six state championships. Steve Savareae also coached the team.

== Alumni ==
- Eric Brock, football defensive back
- Eltoro Freeman, football linebacker
- Kendall Graveman, baseball pitcher
- Marquies Gunn, football defensive end
- Robert Howard, swimmer
- Willie Martin, football player in the CFL and football coach
- Cederian Morgan, football wide receiver
- Terrell Owens, football wide receiver
- Robert Parker, football running back
- Nathan Poole, football running back
- Red Phillips, football player
- Malcolm Simmons, football player
- Scottie Vines, football wide receiver
- Jim Whatley, baseball player
- Sharon Yates, judge of the Alabama Court of Civil Appeals
- Martevious Young, football quarterback
