= Herzfeld (surname) =

Herzfeld is a German and Ashkenazi surname. Notable people with the surname include:

- Avraham Herzfeld (1891–1973), Zionist activist and Israeli politician
- Charles M. Herzfeld (1925–2017), American scientist
- Ernst Herzfeld (1879–1948), German archaeologist and Iranologist
- Estella Herzfeld (1837–1881), Dutch poet
- Guido Herzfeld (1851–1923), German actor
- Helmut Herzfeld or John Heartfield (1891–1968), German photomontage artist
- Ida of Herzfeld (c. 788 – c. 813), widow of a Saxon duke who devoted her life to the poor following the death of her husband in 811
- Jacob Herzfeld (1762–1826), German actor and theatre director
- Jim Herzfeld, American film and television screenwriter
- John Herzfeld (born 1948), American motion picture and television director, screenwriter, actor and producer
- Judith Herzfeld (b. 1948), American biophysical chemist
- Karl Herzfeld (1892–1978), Austrian-American physicist
- Levi Herzfeld (1810–1884), German rabbi and historian.
- Shmuel Herzfeld (b. 1974), American Modern Orthodox rabbi who heads the National Synagogue of Washington DC
- Thomas J. Herzfeld (b. 1945), American businessman
- Victor von Herzfeld (1856–1919), Hungarian violinist and composer.

== See also ==
- Wieland Herzfelde (1896–1988), German publisher and writer
- Reuben Herzfeld House, historic house in Alexander City, Alabama named after German immigrant Reuben Herzfeld
