= Avondale Historic District =

Avondale Historic District may refer to:

- Avondale Historic District (Alexander City, Alabama), listed on the National Register of Historic Places in Tallapoosa County, Alabama
- Avondale Historic District (Jacksonville, Florida), listed on the National Register of Historic Places in Duval County, Florida
