= Cederian Morgan =

American football player (born 2007)

No. 8 – Alabama Crimson Tide
- Position: Wide receiver
- Class: RS. Freshman

Personal information
- Born: September 12, 2007 (age 19)
- Listed height: 6 ft 4 in (1.93 m)
- Listed weight: 210 lb (95 kg)

Career information
- High school: Benjamin Russell (Alexander City, Alabama)

Cederian Morgan (born September 12, 2007) is an American college football wide receiver. He is committed to play college football for the Alabama Crimson Tide.

== Early life ==
Morgan attended Benjamin Russell High School in Alexander City, Alabama. As a sophomore in 2023, he had 36 receptions for 622 yards and four touchdowns. As a junior in 2024, he recorded 70 receptions for 1,162 yards and 14 touchdowns. Morgan was selected to play in the 2026 Navy All-American Bowl.

A five-star recruit, Morgan is rated among the best receivers in the 2026 class. He committed to the University of Alabama to play college football.
