= Scottie Vines =

American football player (born 1979)

No. 10
- Position: Wide receiver

Personal information
- Born: April 17, 1979 (age 47); Alexander City, Alabama, U.S.
- Listed height: 6 ft 1 in (1.85 m)
- Listed weight: 220 lb (100 kg)

Career information
- High school: Benjamin Russell (Alexander City)
- College: Wyoming
- NFL draft: 2003: undrafted

Career history
- Detroit Lions (2003)*; Green Bay Packers (2003–2004)*; Detroit Lions (2004–2006); Philadelphia Soul (2007)
- * Offseason or practice squad member only

Career NFL statistics
- Receptions: 43
- Receiving yards: 468
- Stats at Pro Football Reference

Career AFL statistics
- Receptions: 1
- Receiving yards: 12
- Stats at ArenaFan.com

Scottie Vines (born April 17, 1979) is an American former professional football player who was a wide receiver for the Detroit Lions of the National Football League (NFL). He played college football for the Wyoming Cowboys.

== Early life ==
Vines attended Benjamin Russell High School in Alexander City, Alabama, and was a letterman in football, basketball, and track&field. In basketball, he was named the Regional M.V.P. In track&field, he won the Class 6A State Title on the high jump. Scottie Vines graduated from Benjamin Russell High School in 1998.

== Personal life ==
As of 2014 he is living back in his home town of Alexander City, Alabama working at Madix Store Fixtures Incorporated in Goodwater, AL as a spot welder.

His son Scottie Vines Jnr. won the World U20 Championships in the high jump in 2024.
