= Malcolm Simmons (American football) =

American football player (born 2006)

No. 11 – Texas Tech Red Raiders
- Position: Wide receiver
- Class: Junior

Personal information
- Born: March 27, 2006 (age 20)
- Listed height: 6 ft 0 in (1.83 m)
- Listed weight: 180 lb (82 kg)

Career information
- High school: Benjamin Russell (Alexander City, Alabama)
- College: Auburn (2024–2025); Texas Tech (2026–present)
- Stats at ESPN

Malcolm Simmons is an American college football wide receiver for the Texas Tech Red Raiders. He previously played for the Auburn Tigers.

== Early life ==
Simmons attended Benjamin Russell High School in Alexander City, Alabama. As a senior, he recorded 60 receptions for 1,279 yards and 21 touchdowns. Simmons also participated in track and field, where he was a three-time state long jump champion and two-time state high jump champion, while also setting the Alabama state record for indoor high jump and outdoor long jump. A four-star recruit, he committed to play college football at Auburn University.

== College career ==
Entering his freshman season, Simmons was named Auburn's starting kick returner. In his collegiate debut against Alabama A&M, he tallied two touchdowns, returning a blocked punt for a touchdown and receiving a 57-yard pass from Hank Brown.

=== Statistics ===
| Year | Team | Games | Receiving | | | | Rushing | | | |
| Year | Team | GP | Rec | Yards | Avg | TD | Att | Yards | Avg | TD |
|---|---|---|---|---|---|---|---|---|---|---|
| 2024 | Auburn | 12 | 40 | 451 | 11.3 | 3 | 4 | 13 | 3.3 | 0 |
| Career | | 12 | 40 | 451 | 11.3 | 3 | 4 | 13 | 3.3 | 0 |
