= North Central Historic District (Alexander City, Alabama) =

- U.S. National Register of Historic Places
- U.S. Historic district
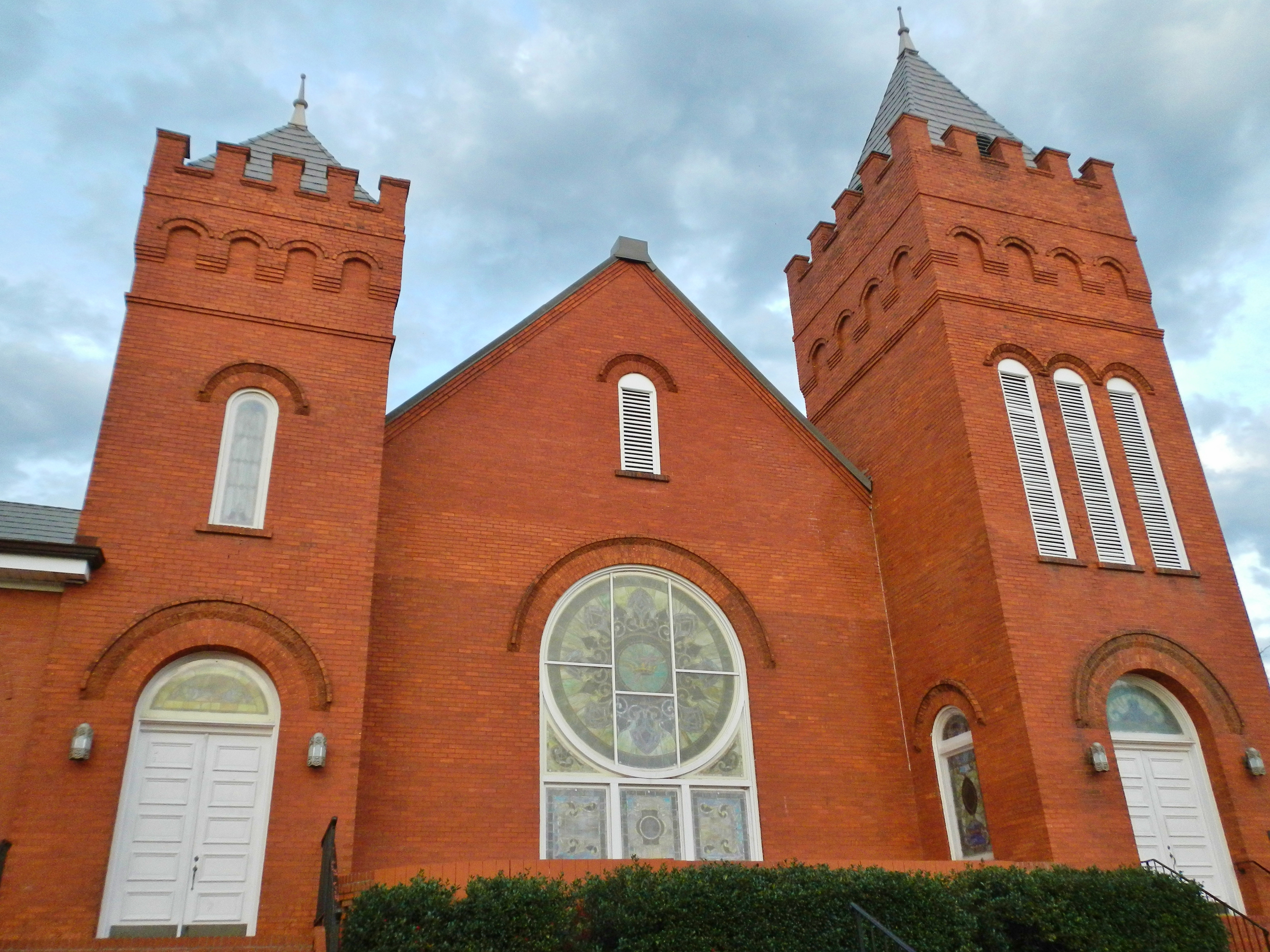
- Alexander City First Methodist Church

- Location within Alabama
- Location: Bet. Hall and Summer, Warren and Hillabee, Warren and Ridgeway, MLK and Hillabee, Alexander City, Alabama
- Coordinates: 32.9586°N 85.9589°W
- Area: 850 acres (3.4 km^{2})
- Architect: E. Walter Burkhardt; Buddy Elliott
- Architectural style: Queen Anne, Romanesque, et al.
- NRHP reference No.: 05000833
- Added to NRHP: August 11, 2005

The North Central Historic District in Alexander City, Alabama, was listed on the National Register of Historic Places in 2005.

The district included 349 buildings deemed contributing and one contributing site, as well as 67 non-contributing buildings, in a 850 acres (3.4 km^{2}) area roughly spanning between Hall and Summer, Warren and Hillabee, Warren and Ridgeway, MLK and Hillabee streets/avenues.

The area mainly developed from the 1880s to 1954 (50 years before NRHP nomination), with the City Cemetery (founded 1875) and the Bethel Baptist church cemetery (c.1875) preceding.

Architectural styles represented in the district include Queen Anne and Romanesque Revival. The district includes several significant ranch-style houses designed by Auburn University professor E. Walter Burkhardt and local architect Buddy Elliott.
