= Russell Family Historic District =

Historic district in Alabama, United States

- U.S. National Register of Historic Places
- U.S. Historic district
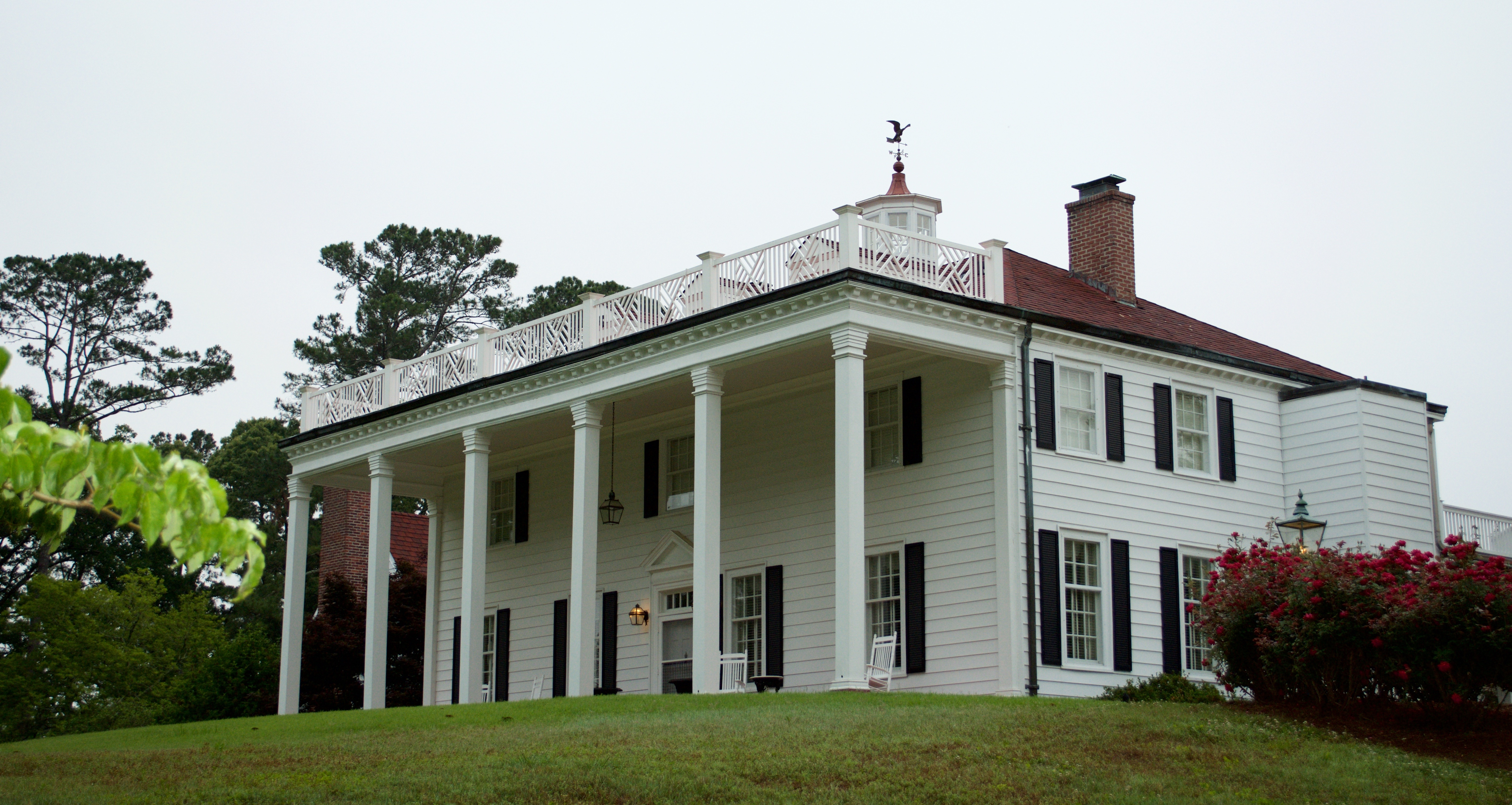

- Location within Alabama Location within the United States
- Location: 35, 65, 85 N. Central, 228, 334 Robin Hill, 101 Russwood, Alexander City, Alabama
- Coordinates: 32°56′36″N 85°57′43″W
- Area: 50 acres (20 ha)
- Built: 1913
- Architectural style: Colonial Revival, Classical Revival
- NRHP reference No.: 05000839
- Added to NRHP: March 21, 2006

Russell Family Historic District is a historic district in Alexander City, Alabama. The district is a collection of houses built by the family of Benjamin Russell. Russell and his children founded the Citizens' Bank of Alexander City in 1900, followed by the Russell Manufacturing Company in 1902. The company, along with B. B. Comer's Avondale Mills, turned Alex City into one of the textile centers of the South.

In 1913, the family built several houses on a hillside overlooking the mills. Benjamin's youngest son, Ben, built a Classical Revival house with a hip roof and façade dominated by four columns with Corinthian capitals. Benjamin's sister, Sally, built a brick, Classical Revival residence with doubled Ionic columns. Thomas Commander Russell, Benjamin's brother who served as Alex City's mayor from 1907 until 1947, built a tan brick Craftsman-style house.

In 1937, the second generation of the family began to build on the family land. Elisabeth, Benjamin's daughter, built a Classical Revival house inspired by the "Tara House" from the film Gone with the Wind. The next year, Thomas Russell built a Colonial Revival near-replica of George Washington's Mount Vernon. In 1946 Robert Russell built a house with decorative, wrought iron railings evocative of houses in New Orleans and Monterrey, Mexico.

The district was listed on the National Register of Historic Places in 2006.
