= Eltoro Freeman =

American gridiron football player (born 1989)

No. 21
- Position: Linebacker

Personal information
- Born: May 7, 1989 (age 37); Alexander City, Alabama, U.S.
- Listed height: 5 ft 11 in (1.80 m)
- Listed weight: 225 lb (102 kg)

Career information
- High school: Alexander City (AL) Russell
- College: Auburn
- NFL draft: 2012: undrafted

Career history
- Baltimore Ravens (2012)*; Saskatchewan Roughriders (2015)*
- * Offseason or practice squad member only

Awards and highlights
- BCS national champion (2011)

Eltoro Freeman (born May 7, 1989) is an American former football linebacker.

== Early life ==
Freeman attended Benjamin Russell High School, where he was an All-State performer and recorded 140 tackles and 10 sacks at linebacker his senior year, while taking 15 carries for 223 yards and three scores at running back. As a junior, he registered 100 tackles, including 52 for losses. Considered a four-star recruit by Rivals.com, Freeman ranked No. 22 nationally at outside linebacker and the No. 8 overall recruit in Alabama.

He originally committed to Auburn in 2007 but did not qualify academically.

== College career ==
=== Mississippi Gulf Coast ===
For one-and-a-half years, Freeman attended Mississippi Gulf Coast Community College in Perkinston, Mississippi, where he teamed up with All-American nose tackle Terrence Cody. As a true freshman in 2007, he compiled 65 tackles, 17 tackles-for-loss, five sacks and two forced fumbles. Mississippi Gulf Coast finished the season 12–0 and was named 2007 NJCAA Co-National Champions, their first national title in 23 years.

Freeman earned Juco All-American and MACJC South first team honors in 2007. He redshirted the 2008 season to keep three years of eligibility.

=== Auburn ===
Freeman enrolled early at Auburn to participate in spring practice. After spring drill, he became an instant starter at outside linebacker. He played on the 2010 BCS National Champions Auburn Tigers.

Freeman graduated from Auburn in 2011.

== Professional career ==
=== Baltimore Ravens ===
Freeman went undrafted in the 2012 NFL draft. He was signed by the Baltimore Ravens in May 2012, but released only five days later.

=== Saskatchewan Roughriders ===
After not being signed by any football club for multiple years, Freeman had a chance to tryout with the Saskatchewan Roughriders of the Canadian Football League in late January 2015. About one month later Freeman and the Riders agreed to a contract. Freeman was released by the Roughriders on June 15, 2015, after appearing in the first pre-season game.
