= South Central Historic District (Alexander City, Alabama) =

Historic district in the state of Alabama, United States of America

- U.S. National Register of Historic Places
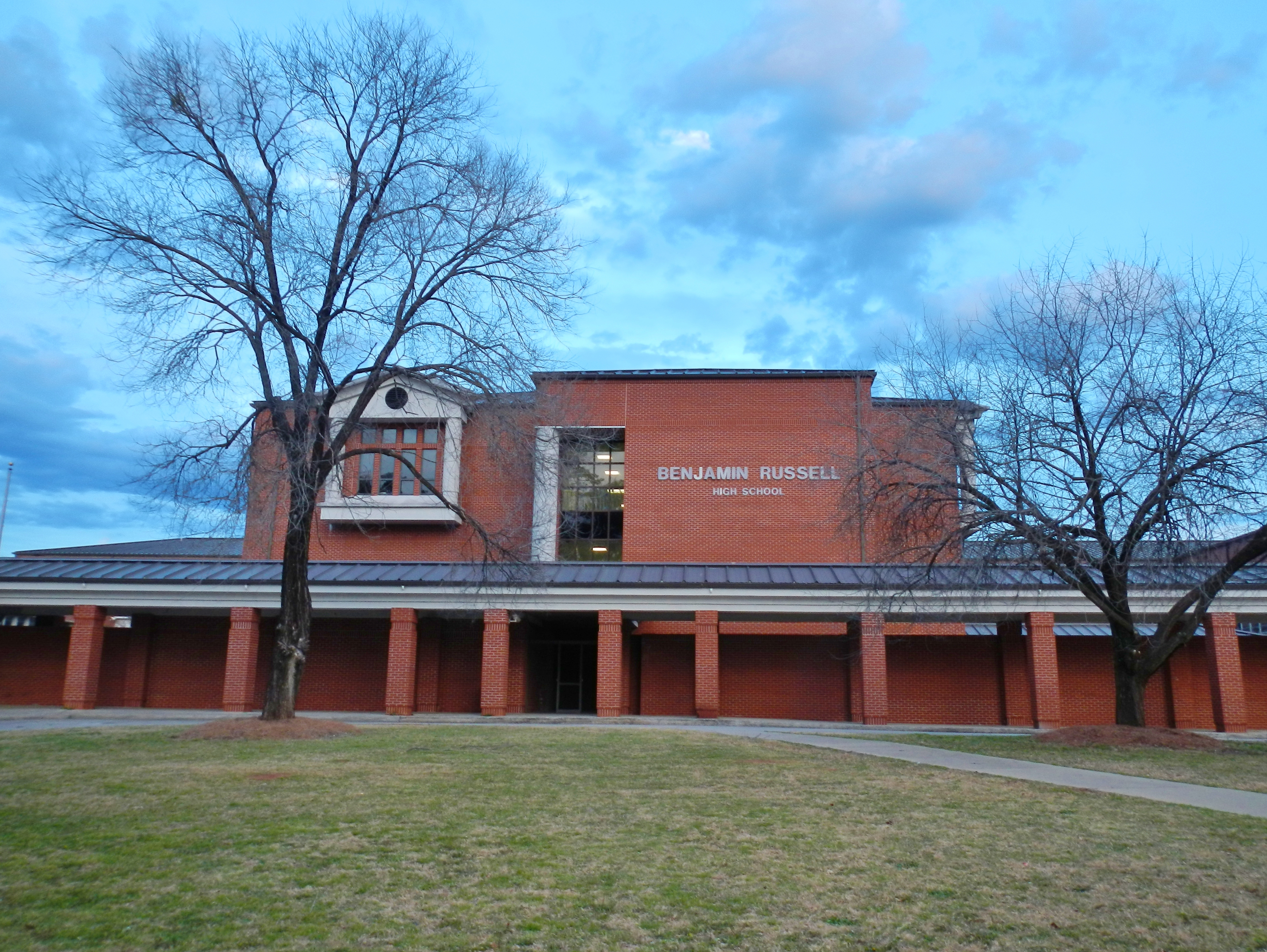
- Benjamin Russell High School

- Location within Alabama
- Location: Bounded by Broad St., Tallpoosa St., Cherokee Rd., Bishop St., Franklin St., Willow St., Alexander City, Alabama
- Coordinates: 32.935278°N 85.950833°W
- Area: 200 acres (0.81 km^{2})
- Architectural style: Queen Anne, Greek Revival, et al.
- NRHP reference No.: 05000840
- Added to NRHP: August 9, 2005

The South Central Historic District in Alexander City, Alabama is a historic district that was listed on the National Register of Historic Places in 2005.

It consists of an area of about 200 acres (0.81 km^{2}) with 137 contributing buildings, just south of Alexander City's downtown core. The district is roughly bounded by Broad St., Tallpoosa St., Cherokee Rd., Bishop St., Franklin St., and Willow St.

Besides the Jackson House on Cherokee Road, which was built in the 1860s, all contributing resources in the district were built during 1890 to 1950, and the Jackson House was itself remodelled extensively around 1910.

Architectural styles represented include Queen Anne and Greek Revival. It includes two "well-articulated" Queen Anne houses, and 12 shotgun houses.

The Benjamin Russell School, built in 1950 with a 1980 three-story front addition, and 24 other buildings in the district were deemed non-contributing.
