= A.J. and Emma E. Thomas Coley House =

Historic house in Alabama, United States

- A. J. and Emma E. Thomas Coley House
- U.S. National Register of Historic Places
- Alabama Register of Landmarks and Heritage
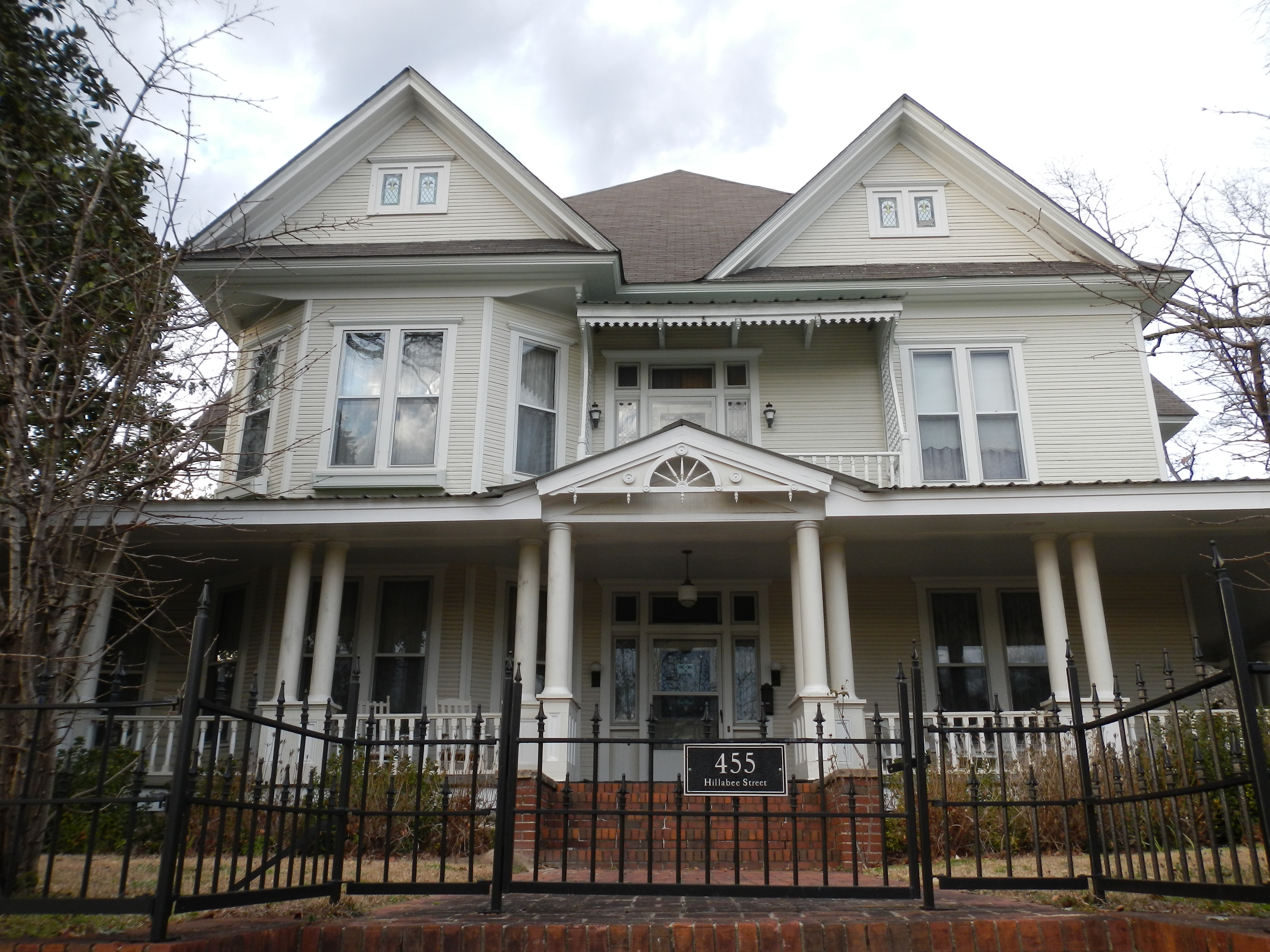
- The house in February 2012

- Location within Alabama Location within the United States
- Location: 416 Hillabee St., Alexander City, Alabama
- Coordinates: 32°56′51″N 85°56′55″W
- Area: less than one acre
- Built: 1895
- Architectural style: Queen Anne
- NRHP reference No.: 90002109

Significant dates
- Added to NRHP: January 3, 1991
- Designated ARLH: March 30, 1989

The A. J. and Emma E. Thomas Coley House (also known as the Coley-Joiner House) is a historic residence in Alexander City, Alabama. The house was built by A. J. Coley, a physician who was born near Alex City in 1858. After studying medicine in Philadelphia and New York City, Coley returned to Alabama and married Emma E. Thomas. In 1895, the couple built their house in Queen Anne style, a popular style for houses in the late 19th century. Coley served as mayor of Alex City from 1902 to 1903. In 1909 Coley sold the house to another physician, James Adrian Googan, who used it as his residence and an infirmary. Except during World War II, when it was subdivided into apartments, it has been maintained as a single-family home since Googan's death in 1920.

A shed roofed porch stretches across the first floor of the façade, and wraps part way around each side. The porch is supported by pairs of round columns, and has a decorative pediment over the entryway. Pairs of one-over-one sash windows flank the front door, which is surrounded by a transom and sidelights. Two pedimented gables dominate the second floor of the façade, with similar gables on the rear of the house and a single gable on each side. The interior is laid out in a traditional center-hall plan, with four large rooms on each floor in the front of the house, and smaller rooms towards the rear.

The house was listed on the Alabama Register of Landmarks and Heritage in 1989 and the National Register of Historic Places in 1991.
