= Alexander City Schools =

School district in Alabama

Address
- 375 Lee St Alexander City, Tallapoosa County, Alabama, 35010; United States

District information
- Type: Public
- Motto: Inspiring hope and creating pathways to success
- Grades: PK-12
- Established: 1879; 147 years ago
- Superintendent: Beverly Price
- Schools: 5
- NCES District ID: 0100030

Students and staff
- Students: 2,948 ('20-'21)
- Teachers: 170.39 ('20-'21)
- Staff: 67.01 ('20-'21)
- Student–teacher ratio: 17.30 ('20-'21)

Other information
- Website: Official website

Alexander City Schools is the public school district of Alexander City, Alabama, established in 1879. Alexander City Schools serves 2,948 students and employs 170 teachers and 67 staff as of the 2020–2021 school year. The district includes two elementary schools, two middle schools, and one high school.

== History ==
The Alexander City schools were affected historically by desegregation efforts within Alabama. By the fall of 1970, the 31% minority student total of the public school system was distributed within the then-existing schools as follows:

- Jim Pearson Elementary (Grades 1-2) total enrollment of 704 numbered 235 black and 469 other students. At the same time, the school had 9 black teachers and 21 other teachers on its 30-member faculty.
- Laurel Elementary (Grades 3-4) total enrollment of 652 numbered 213 black and 439 other students. At the same time, the school had 9 black teachers and 19 other teachers on its 28-member faculty.
- Russell Elementary (Grades 5-6) total enrollment of 662 numbered 200 black and 462 other students. At the same time, the school had 9 black teachers and 15 other teachers on its 24-member faculty.
- Alexander City Junior High (Grades 7-9) total enrollment of 1,102 numbered 369 black and 733 other students. At the same time, the school had 13 black teachers and 32 other teachers on its 45-member faculty.
- Benjamin Russell High (Grades 10-12) total enrollment of 806 numbered 204 black and 602 other students. At the same time, the school had 9 black teachers and 35 other teachers on its 44-member faculty.

In 2005 the Alexander City Schools system was awarded district accreditation by the Southern Association of Colleges and Schools (SACS). All graduates of Benjamin Russell High School gain two years of tuition-free education through the Central Alabama Community College under the Gateway to Education Scholarship Program, which was awarded the National Civic Star Award by the American Association of School Administrators in 2007.

== School Board ==
Name	Position
Brett Pritchard	President
Michael Ransaw	Vice-President
Chantè Ruffin	Member
Kevin Speaks	Member
Adam Wade	Member

== Schools ==
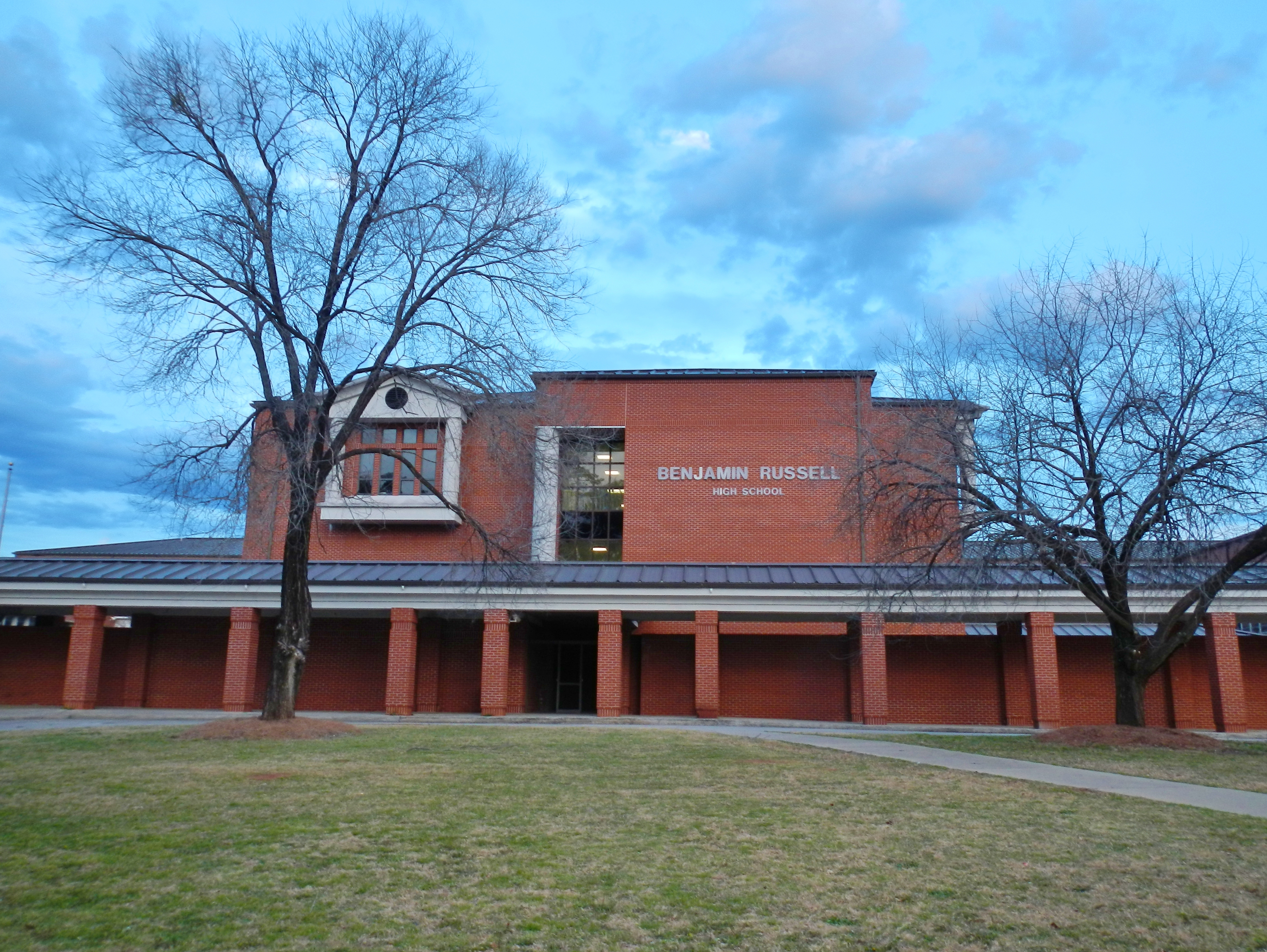
Benjamin Russell High School

Alexander City Schools consists of five schools:

- Jim Pearson Elementary School (PK-2)
- Nathaniel H. Stephens Elementary School (3-4)
- Alexander City Middle School (7-8)
- Benjamin Russell High School (9-12)

== Facilities ==
In partnership with the College of Engineering of Auburn University, Benjamin Russell High School has included an Engineering Academy since 2007.

The High School also has a "Success Center", a learning lab for students who have not passed one or more sections of the High School Graduation Exam, giving them an opportunity to retake the test.

== Governance ==
Its interim superintendent is Beverly Price, appointed in April 2022. The High School Principal is Shannon Benefield.

== Strategic Plan ==
The district's Strategic Plan for 2008–2013 includes targets for dental screening, physical activity for all students, responsible eating and nutritional information, safety codes, behavior monitoring, richer student experiences and problem solving, after-school programs, mentorship program, parental involvement, greater professional development for teachers, and art and foreign-language teaching.

== Policies ==
The district's dress code requires students to be neatly dressed, clean and well groomed. Boys' shirts must be tucked in, and shorts and skirts must be no shorter than 2 inches above the kneecap. Pants must cover the hips, and shoes must be worn.

Penalties for student misconduct include detention, in-school suspension, out-of-school suspension, Saturday school, alternative education program, and corporal punishment. The latter consists of a maximum of three licks administered in private to the student's buttocks with a wooden paddle. Parents who object to paddling may request an alternative punishment. No student is forced to submit to a paddling. Students may choose a spanking in lieu of suspension.

== Notable alumni ==
- Eltoro Freeman, National Football League linebacker
- Kendall Graveman, Major League Baseball player
- Terrell Owens, National Football League wide receiver
- Bill White, Major League Baseball player
- Martevious Young, Indoor Football League, quarterback
