= Avondale Historic District (Alexander City, Alabama) =

Historic district in Alabama, United States

- U.S. National Register of Historic Places
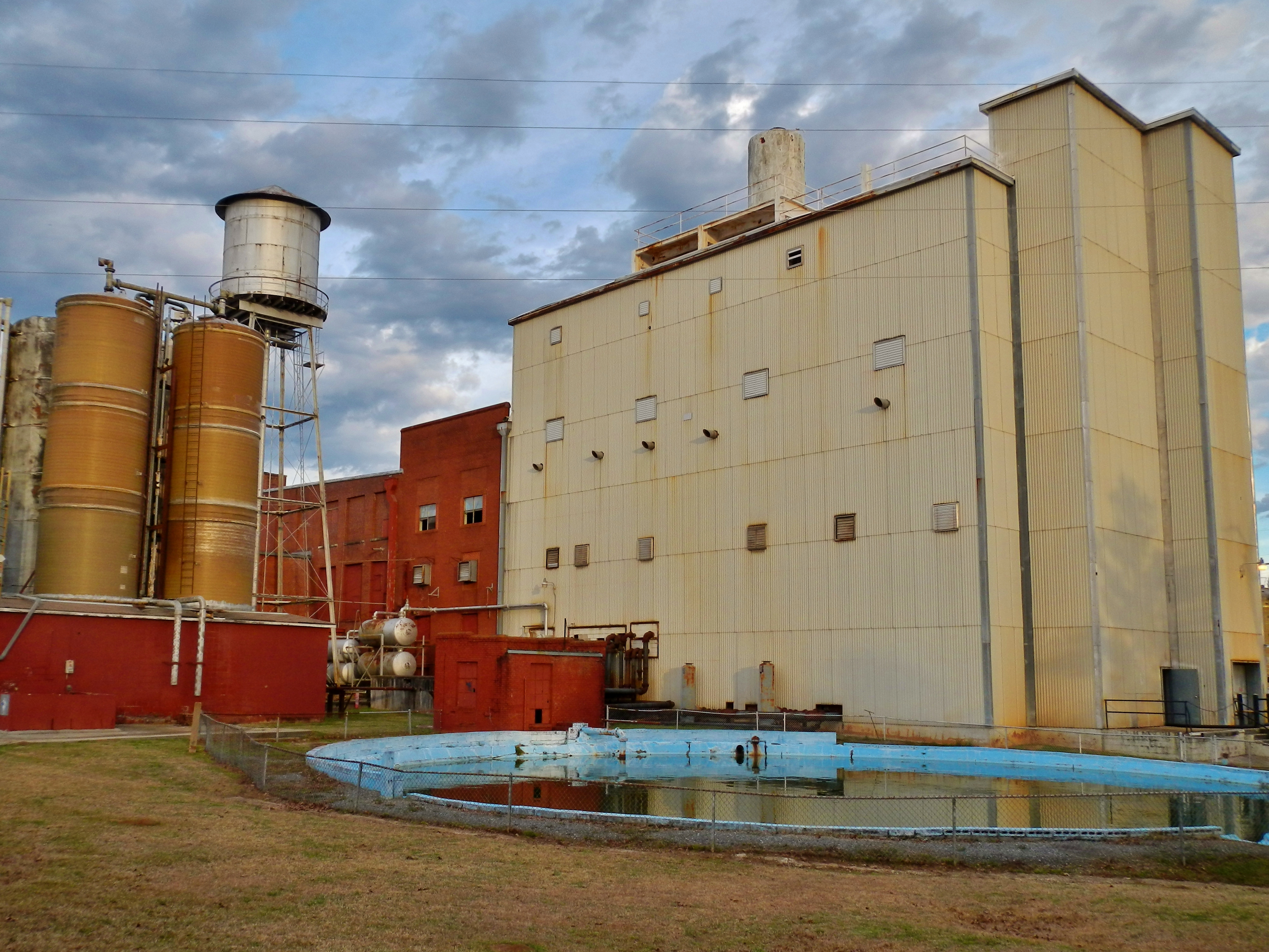
- This is a photograph of the Parkdale Mills (formerly Avondale Mills) in the Avondale Historic District in Alexander City, Alabama.

- Location within Alabama
- Location: Bet. Rose Ave. and Scott St., Hillabee St. and 7th St., Alexander City, Alabama
- Coordinates: 32°56′24″N 85°56′28″W
- Area: 750 acres (3.0 km^{2})
- Architectural style: Bungalow/craftsman, Tudor Revival, et al.
- NRHP reference No.: 05000837
- Added to NRHP: August 9, 2005

The Avondale Historic District in Alexander City, Alabama, is a 750 acres (3.0 km^{2}) historic district which was listed on the National Register of Historic Places in 2005.

The district includes a textile mill building, formerly the Avondale Mills, which closed in 2006 and is now known as Parkdale Mills.

It includes a total of 428 contributing buildings and a contributing site, as well as 79 non-contributing buildings or structures, in an area roughly between Rose Ave. and Scott St., Hillabee St. and 7th St. in Alexander City.

It includes two sections that were developed at the same time: the Avondale Mill Village which was built and operated by the Avondale Mill Company, and the adjacent Oak Lawn neighborhood, whose residents also worked for the mill. The mill village includes a textile mile, workers' houses, a superintendent's house, and two churches. The Oak Lawn neighborhood includes a row of commercial block buildings on 8th Avenue, a store on 6th Avenue, four brick or brick veneer commercial buildings on Hillabee St., a warehouse, two more churches, and many residences (mostly one-story wood houses, but some duplexes and one triplex). The two areas are divided by Central of Georgia railroad tracks.

Residences in the district include many Craftsman style bungalows, some Tudor Revival architecture, and other styles, as well as vernacular buildings.
