= Dadeville Historic District =

Historic district in Alabama, United States

- U.S. National Register of Historic Places
- U.S. Historic district
- Alabama Register of Landmarks and Heritage
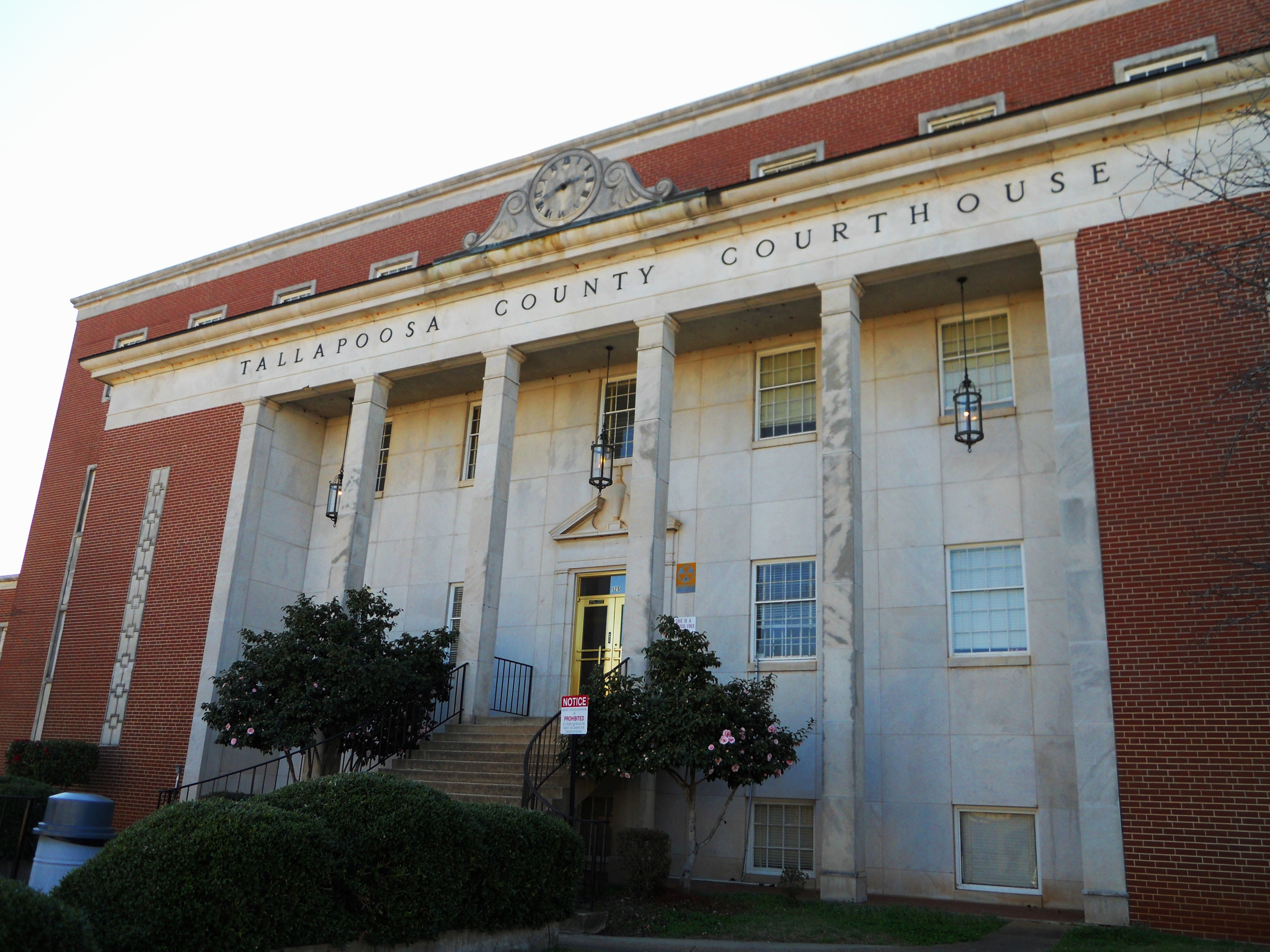
- Tallapoosa County Courthouse

- Location within Alabama Location within the United States
- Location: Downtown Dadeville, Alabama
- Coordinates: 32°49′53″N 85°45′49″W
- NRHP reference No.: 13000471

Significant dates
- Added to NRHP: July 10, 2013
- Designated ARLH: June 21, 2012

The Dadeville Historic District is a historic district that comprises the central portion of Dadeville, Alabama. The period of significance extends from 1842, when the district's oldest building was built, to 1970, when commercial development began to move to the outskirts of town.

The Dadeville Historic District was placed on the Alabama Register of Landmarks and Heritage in 2012 and the National Register of Historic Places on July 10, 2013.
