= Malcolm Simmons (soccer) =

Canadian soccer player (born 2003)

Personal information
- Full name: Malcolm Michael Simmons
- Date of birth: February 17, 2003 (age 23)
- Place of birth: Trois-Rivières, Quebec, Canada
- Height: 6 ft 4 in (1.93 m)
- Position: Midfielder

Youth career
- CS Panellinios
- 2021–2023: S.C. Lusitânia
- 2022–2023: → Benfica (loan)

Senior career*
Years	Team	Apps	(Gls)
2021–2023	S.C. Lusitânia	16	(0)
2022–2023	→ Benfica U23 (loan)	–	(–)
2023–2024	Whitecaps FC 2	29	(0)
2024	→ Vancouver Whitecaps FC (loan)	0	(0)
- * Club domestic league appearances and goals as of October 21, 2024

Malcolm Michael Simmons (born February 17, 2003) is a Canadian soccer player.

== Club career ==
In 2021, he joined Portuguese club S.C. Lusitânia, splitting time between the U19 and senior sides.

In August 2022, he joined Benfica U23 on loan. He played with the side in the U23 Liga Revelação, and helped the side reach the final of the Torneio Abertura.

In August 2023, he returned to Canada and signed with Whitecaps FC 2 in MLS Next Pro. In July 2024, he signed a short-term loan with the first team, ahead of a friendly against Wrexham. After the 2024 season, the club declined his option for 2025.

== Career statistics ==
As of October 21, 2024

Club	Season	League			Playoffs		Cup		Continental		Total	
Club	Season	Division	Apps	Goals	Apps	Goals	Apps	Goals	Apps	Goals	Apps	Goals
S.C. Lusitânia	2021-22	Liga Meo Azores	16	0	—		0	0	—		16	0
Whitecaps FC 2	2023	MLS Next Pro	5	0	—		—		—		5	0
Whitecaps FC 2	2024	MLS Next Pro	24	0	1	0	—		—		25	0
Whitecaps FC 2	Total		29	0	1	0	0	0	0	0	30	0
Career total			45	0	1	0	0	0	0	0	46	0
