= Reuben Herzfeld House =

Historic house in Alabama, United States

- U.S. National Register of Historic Places
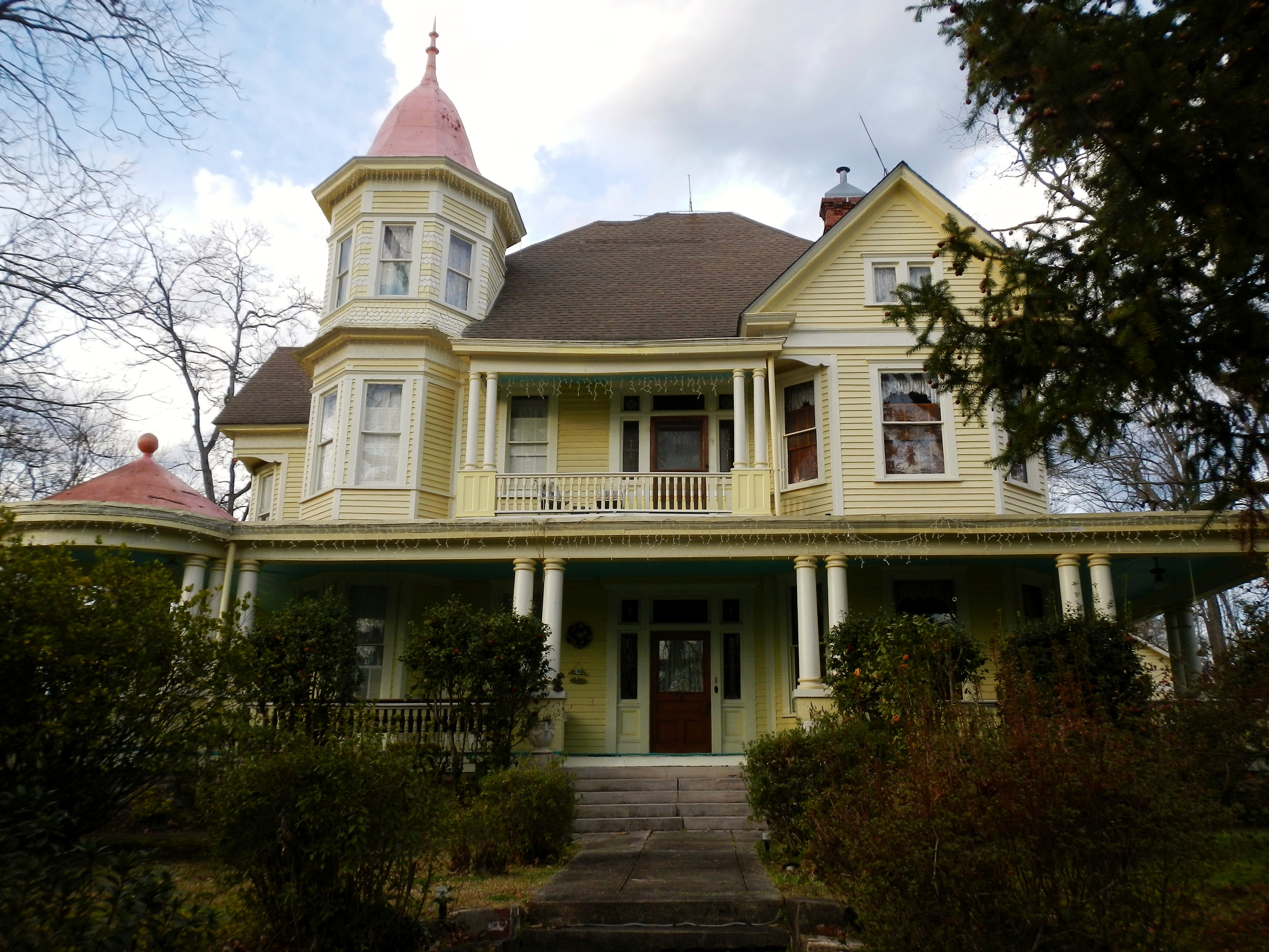
- The Reuben Herzfeld House in 2012

- Location within Alabama
- Location: 497 Hillabee Street, Alexander City, Alabama
- Coordinates: 32°56′51″N 85°56′53″W
- Area: 2 acres (0.81 ha)
- Built: 1890
- Architectural style: Queen Anne
- NRHP reference No.: 95001023
- Added to NRHP: August 22, 1995

The Reuben Herzfeld House, also known as Herzfeld-Harpst-Payne House and Mistletoe Bough, is a historic mansion in Alexander City, Alabama, U.S. It was built from 1890 to 1895 for Reuben Herzfeld, a German-born immigrant, and it was designed in the Queen Anne architectural style. It has been listed on the National Register of Historic Places since August 22, 1995.
