= Alexander City, Alabama =

City in Alabama, United States

- City
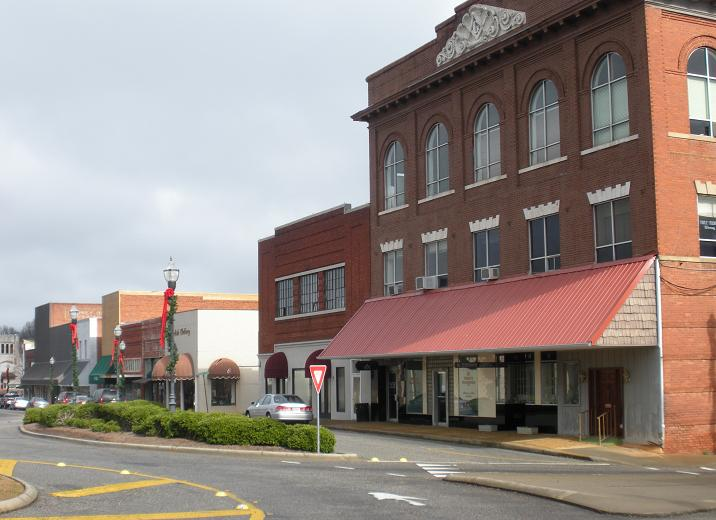
- The Alexander City Commercial Historic District was added to the National Register of Historic Places on June 22, 2000.

- Seal Logo
- Nickname: Alex City
- Motto: Hope. Courage. Pride.
- Location of Alexander City in Tallapoosa County, Alabama.
- Coordinates: 32°53′19″N 85°55′50″W
- Country: United States
- State: Alabama
- County: Tallapoosa
- Founded: 1872
- Named for: Edward Porter Alexander

Government
  - Mayor: Mike Densmore
  - Executive Administrative Assistant: Dana Fuller

Area
  - Total: 43.99 sq mi (113.94 km^{2})
  - Land: 43.70 sq mi (113.19 km^{2})
  - Water: 0.29 sq mi (0.75 km^{2})
- Elevation: 682 ft (208 m)

Population (2020)
  - Total: 14,843
  - Density: 339.7/sq mi (131.14/km^{2})
- Time zone: UTC-6 (CST)
  - Summer (DST): UTC-5 (CDT)
- ZIP code: 35010-35011
- Area code: 256
- FIPS code: 01-01132
- GNIS feature ID: 2403077
- Website: Official website

Alexander City, known to locals as "Alex City", is the largest city in Tallapoosa County, Alabama, United States, with a population of 14,843 as of the 2020 census. It has been the largest community in Tallapoosa County since 1910. It is known for Lake Martin with its 750 miles (1,210 km) of wooded shoreline and 44,000 acres (18,000 ha) of water. Lake Martin stands on the Tallapoosa River and offers boating, swimming, fishing, golfing, and camping. Many neighborhoods and luxury homes are located on the lake.

The city's economy was traditionally based on the textile industry, but in recent times its economic base has become more diversified as textile jobs have gone to India.

== History ==
Alexander City was incorporated in 1872 as Youngsville, after its founder James Young. In 1873, the Savannah and Memphis Railroad came to the city. The city was renamed in honor of the railroad's President Edward Porter Alexander, who had been a brigadier general in the Confederate army during the U.S. Civil War.

On June 13, 1902, at 1 pm, a fire broke out in the Alexander City Machine shop and destroyed much of the town. At the time, Alexander City did not have a water system and all buildings, including the telegraph office, post office and three banks were burned.

In 2015, plaintiffs represented by the Southern Poverty Law Center sued the City of Alexander and Police Chief Willie Robinson in federal court, alleging that they had from 2013 to 2015 operated "a modern-day debtors' prison" that unconstitutionally used its police force to arrest and detain at least 190 poor defendants who were unable to pay Municipal Court-imposed fines and costs. In 2017, the city reached a settlement, in which the city and its insurer agreed to pay $680,000 to persons illegally jailed.

== Geography ==
According to the U.S. Census Bureau, the city has a total area of 39.0 square miles (101.0 km^{2}), of which 38.8 square miles (100.5 km^{2}) is land and 0.2 square miles (0.5 km^{2}) (0.44%) is water.

Alexander City is located on U.S. Route 280. Birmingham is 60 miles (97 km) to the north, Auburn is 40 miles (64 km) southeast and Montgomery is 50 miles (80 km) south-southwest of Alexander City.

=== Climate ===
The climate in this area is characterized by hot, humid summers and generally mild to cool winters. According to the Köppen Climate Classification system, Alexander City has a humid subtropical climate, abbreviated "Cfa" on climate maps.

Climate data for Alexander City, Alabama, 1991–2020 normals, extremes 1969–present
Month	Jan	Feb	Mar	Apr	May	Jun	Jul	Aug	Sep	Oct	Nov	Dec	Year
Record high °F (°C)	80 (27)	82 (28)	89 (32)	92 (33)	96 (36)	102 (39)	104 (40)	105 (41)	101 (38)	100 (38)	94 (34)	81 (27)	105 (41)
Mean maximum °F (°C)	71.4 (21.9)	75.0 (23.9)	81.9 (27.7)	85.4 (29.7)	90.9 (32.7)	95.3 (35.2)	97.3 (36.3)	96.8 (36.0)	93.4 (34.1)	87.5 (30.8)	79.8 (26.6)	73.3 (22.9)	98.5 (36.9)
Mean daily maximum °F (°C)	56.0 (13.3)	60.1 (15.6)	68.1 (20.1)	75.3 (24.1)	82.3 (27.9)	88.2 (31.2)	91.2 (32.9)	90.2 (32.3)	85.7 (29.8)	76.7 (24.8)	66.4 (19.1)	58.4 (14.7)	74.9 (23.8)
Daily mean °F (°C)	44.1 (6.7)	47.7 (8.7)	54.8 (12.7)	61.8 (16.6)	70.1 (21.2)	77.1 (25.1)	80.5 (26.9)	79.4 (26.3)	74.2 (23.4)	63.7 (17.6)	53.4 (11.9)	46.6 (8.1)	62.8 (17.1)
Mean daily minimum °F (°C)	32.1 (0.1)	35.2 (1.8)	41.5 (5.3)	48.4 (9.1)	57.8 (14.3)	66.1 (18.9)	69.7 (20.9)	68.6 (20.3)	62.7 (17.1)	50.8 (10.4)	40.3 (4.6)	34.9 (1.6)	50.7 (10.4)
Mean minimum °F (°C)	16.5 (−8.6)	21.1 (−6.1)	25.9 (−3.4)	34.2 (1.2)	43.8 (6.6)	57.2 (14.0)	63.7 (17.6)	61.6 (16.4)	50.5 (10.3)	35.8 (2.1)	26.3 (−3.2)	21.4 (−5.9)	14.3 (−9.8)
Record low °F (°C)	−6 (−21)	5 (−15)	12 (−11)	25 (−4)	35 (2)	42 (6)	55 (13)	53 (12)	38 (3)	26 (−3)	14 (−10)	−1 (−18)	−6 (−21)
Average precipitation inches (mm)	5.72 (145)	5.49 (139)	5.64 (143)	4.64 (118)	4.46 (113)	4.76 (121)	5.21 (132)	4.70 (119)	3.64 (92)	2.86 (73)	4.40 (112)	5.47 (139)	56.99 (1,446)
Average snowfall inches (cm)	0.5 (1.3)	0.0 (0.0)	0.0 (0.0)	0.0 (0.0)	0.0 (0.0)	0.0 (0.0)	0.0 (0.0)	0.0 (0.0)	0.0 (0.0)	0.0 (0.0)	0.0 (0.0)	0.2 (0.51)	0.7 (1.8)
Average precipitation days (≥ 0.01 in)	10.6	10.3	9.6	8.6	8.5	10.5	11.2	10.5	7.1	6.5	7.7	10.5	111.6
Average snowy days (≥ 0.1 in)	0.2	0.0	0.0	0.0	0.0	0.0	0.0	0.0	0.0	0.0	0.0	0.1	0.3
Source: NOAA

== Demographics ==
Historical population
Census	Pop.	Note	%±
1880	796		—
1890	679		−14.7%
1900	1,061		56.3%
1910	1,710		61.2%
1920	2,293		34.1%
1930	4,519		97.1%
1940	6,640		46.9%
1950	6,430		−3.2%
1960	13,140		104.4%
1970	12,358		−6.0%
1980	13,807		11.7%
1990	14,917		8.0%
2000	15,008		0.6%
2010	14,875		−0.9%
2020	14,843		−0.2%
U.S. Decennial Census

Alexander City first appeared on the 1880 U.S. Census as an incorporated city. At that time, it was the largest community in the county (though would lose the distinction to Dadeville for 1890–1900, reclaiming the title and holding it since 1910).

Alexander City was the principal city of the former Alexander City Micropolitan Statistical Area, a micropolitan area that covered Coosa and Tallapoosa counties and had a combined population of 53,677 at the 2000 census. The micropolitan statistical area was removed in 2013 by the United States Office of Management and Budget.

=== Racial and ethnic composition ===
Alexander City city, Alabama – Racial and ethnic composition Note: the US Census treats Hispanic/Latino as an ethnic category. This table excludes Latinos from the racial categories and assigns them to a separate category. Hispanics/Latinos may be of any race.
Race / Ethnicity (NH = Non-Hispanic)	Pop 1980	Pop 1990	Pop 2000	Pop 2010	Pop 2020	% 1980	% 1990	% 2000	% 2010	% 2020
White alone (NH)	9,930	10,678	10,553	9,131	8,587	71.92%	71.58%	70.32%	61.38%	57.85%
Black or African American alone (NH)	3,723	4,175	4,251	4,746	4,886	26.96%	27.99%	28.32%	31.91%	32.92%
Native American or Alaska Native alone (NH)	22	16	19	35	25	0.16%	0.11%	0.13%	0.24%	0.17%
Asian alone (NH)	83	27	42	139	156	0.60%	0.18%	0.28%	0.93%	1.05%
Native Hawaiian or Pacific Islander alone (NH)	x	x	3	2	0	x	x	0.02%	0.01%	0.00%
Other race alone (NH)	5	3	3	4	35	0.04%	0.02%	0.02%	0.03%	0.24%
Mixed race or Multiracial (NH)	x	x	70	110	411	x	x	0.47%	0.74%	2.77%
Hispanic or Latino (any race)	44	18	67	708	743	0.32%	0.12%	0.45%	4.76%	5.01%
Total	13,807	14,917	15,008	14,875	14,843	100.00%	100.00%	100.00%	100.00%	100.00%

=== 2020 census ===
As of the 2020 census, Alexander City had a population of 14,843. The median age was 43.0 years. 22.3% of residents were under the age of 18 and 21.4% of residents were 65 years of age or older. For every 100 females there were 89.7 males, and for every 100 females age 18 and over there were 85.1 males age 18 and over.

59.7% of residents lived in urban areas, while 40.3% lived in rural areas.

There were 6,194 households in Alexander City, of which 29.4% had children under the age of 18 living in them and 3,872 were family households. Of all households, 38.6% were married-couple households, 18.4% were households with a male householder and no spouse or partner present, and 37.6% were households with a female householder and no spouse or partner present. About 31.8% of all households were made up of individuals and 15.3% had someone living alone who was 65 years of age or older.

There were 7,236 housing units, of which 14.4% were vacant. The homeowner vacancy rate was 1.9% and the rental vacancy rate was 8.3%.

=== 2010 census ===
At the 2010 census there were 14,875 people in 6,064 households, including 4,050 families, in the city. The population density was 383.4 inhabitants per square mile (148.0/km^{2}). There were 6,834 housing units at an average density of 176.1 per square mile (68/km^{2}). The racial makeup of the city was 62.2% White, 32.0% Black or African American, 0.2% Native American, 0.9% Asian, 0.0% Pacific Islander, 3.8% from other races, and 0.9% from two or more races. 4.8% of the population were Hispanic or Latino of any race. Of the 6,064 households 27.5% had children under the age of 18 living with them, 42.2% were married couples living together, 20.1% had a female householder with no husband present, and 33.2% were non-families. 29.7% of households were one person and 13.2% were one person aged 65 or older. The average household size was 2.40 and the average family size was 2.95.

The age distribution was 23.5% under the age of 18, 8.7% from 18 to 24, 24.2% from 25 to 44, 26.0% from 45 to 64, and 17.5% 65 or older. The median age was 39.8 years. For every 100 females, there were 89.8 males. For every 100 women age 18 and over, there were 90.9 men.

The median household income was $34,782 and the median family income was $44,455. Males had a median income of $34,515 versus $31,250 for females. The per capita income for the city was $20,097. About 17.0% of families and 20.5% of the population were below the poverty line, including 30.7% of those under age 18 and 14.3% of those age 65 or over.

== Youngville/Alexander City Precinct/Division (1870–) ==
Historical population
Census	Pop.	Note	%±
1870	1,680		—
1880	4,184		149.0%
1890	3,146		−24.8%
1900	3,822		21.5%
1910	4,550		19.0%
1920	5,498		20.8%
1930	8,077		46.9%
1940	11,617		43.8%
1950	13,291		14.4%
1960	13,208		−0.6%
1970	12,546		−5.0%
1980	18,637		48.5%
1990	19,000		1.9%
2000	19,249		1.3%
2010	19,342		0.5%
U.S. Decennial Census

The beat (precinct) containing Alexander City first appeared on the 1870 U.S. Census as "Youngville" (2nd beat of Tallapoosa County), which was the prior name of Alexander City. In 1880, the 2nd beat of Youngville and the 1st beat of Gold Branch reported a combined population, as neither was returned separately. Beginning in 1890, the name was changed to the Alexander (2nd) Precinct (not "Alexander City"). The precinct name would not change until 1950 when it reported as Alexander City. In 1960, Alexander City precinct was changed to census division as part of a general reorganization of counties.

== Government ==
Alexander City uses a mayor-council government. The government consists of a mayor who is elected at large. The city council consists of six members who are elected from one of six districts.

The city has a police department.

In 2016, Mayor Charles Shaw and his wife were charged with assault following a council meeting brawl with a member of the city council. Following a bench trial, the mayor was convicted of misdemeanor third-degree assault, but his wife was acquitted. The mayor was given a suspended sentence of 30 days in jail and one year of unsupervised probation.

District	Name	Position
1	Mr. Bobby Tapley	Member
2	Ms. Audrey "Buffy" Colvin	President
3	Mr. Scott Hardy	President Pro Tempore
4	Mr. John "Eric" Brown	Member
5	Mr. Chris Brown	Member
6	Mr. Brett Phillips	Member

== Education ==
Alexander City Public Schools are part of the Alexander City Schools district. Schools in the district include Jim Pearson Elementary School, Nathaniel H. Stephens Intermediate School, Alexander City Middle School and Benjamin Russell High School.

Jose Reyes is the Superintendent of Schools.

== Economy ==
Russell Corporation, maker of Russell Athletic, Cross Creek, Jerzees, and Country Cottons apparel, was founded in 1902 and was the largest employer in the city until around 2012. On April 17, 2006, the Russell Corporation was bought by Berkshire Hathaway for an estimated $600 million and merged into Fruit of the Loom. The number of workers employed by Russell Corporation in Alexander City has steadily declined since its peak of 7,000 in 1996; by 2012, most of the manufacturing had been closed in Alexander City and management is now headquartered in Bowling Green, Kentucky.

== Transportation ==
T.C. Russell Field Airport (KALX), off U.S. Highway 280 adjacent to the Airport Industrial Park, is owned and maintained by the City of Alexander City. KALX does not provide scheduled passenger services. The nearest major airports are Birmingham and Montgomery.

Alexander City has no railway station. The nearest rail passenger services are provided at Anniston, which is served daily by Amtrak's The Crescent to Washington DC, Baltimore, Philadelphia and New York.

Alexander City has no scheduled intercity bus service. There is a service provided by Arise Transportation that schedules one stop rides with a 24-hour advance notice.

== Gallery ==
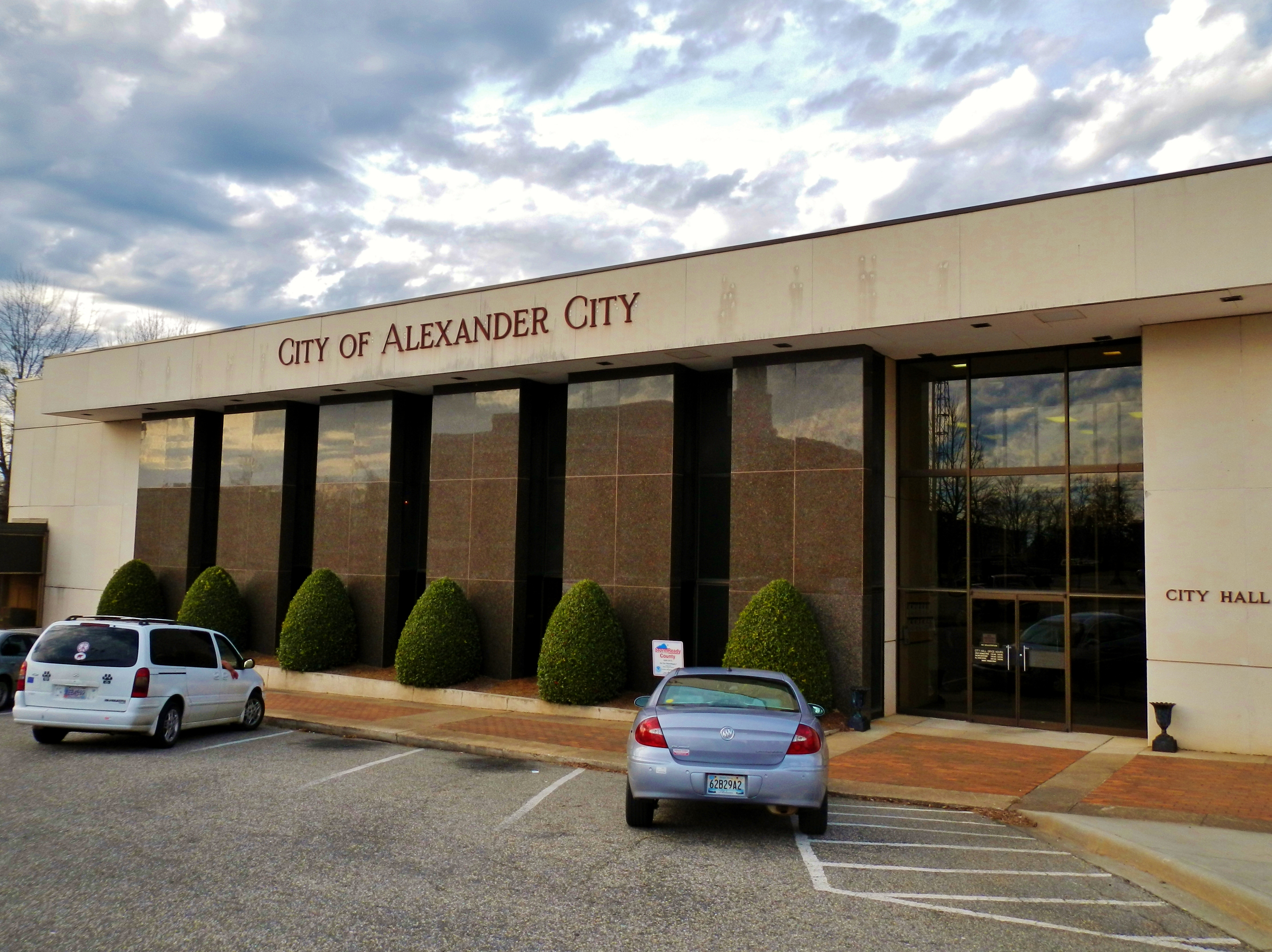
City Hall in Alexander City

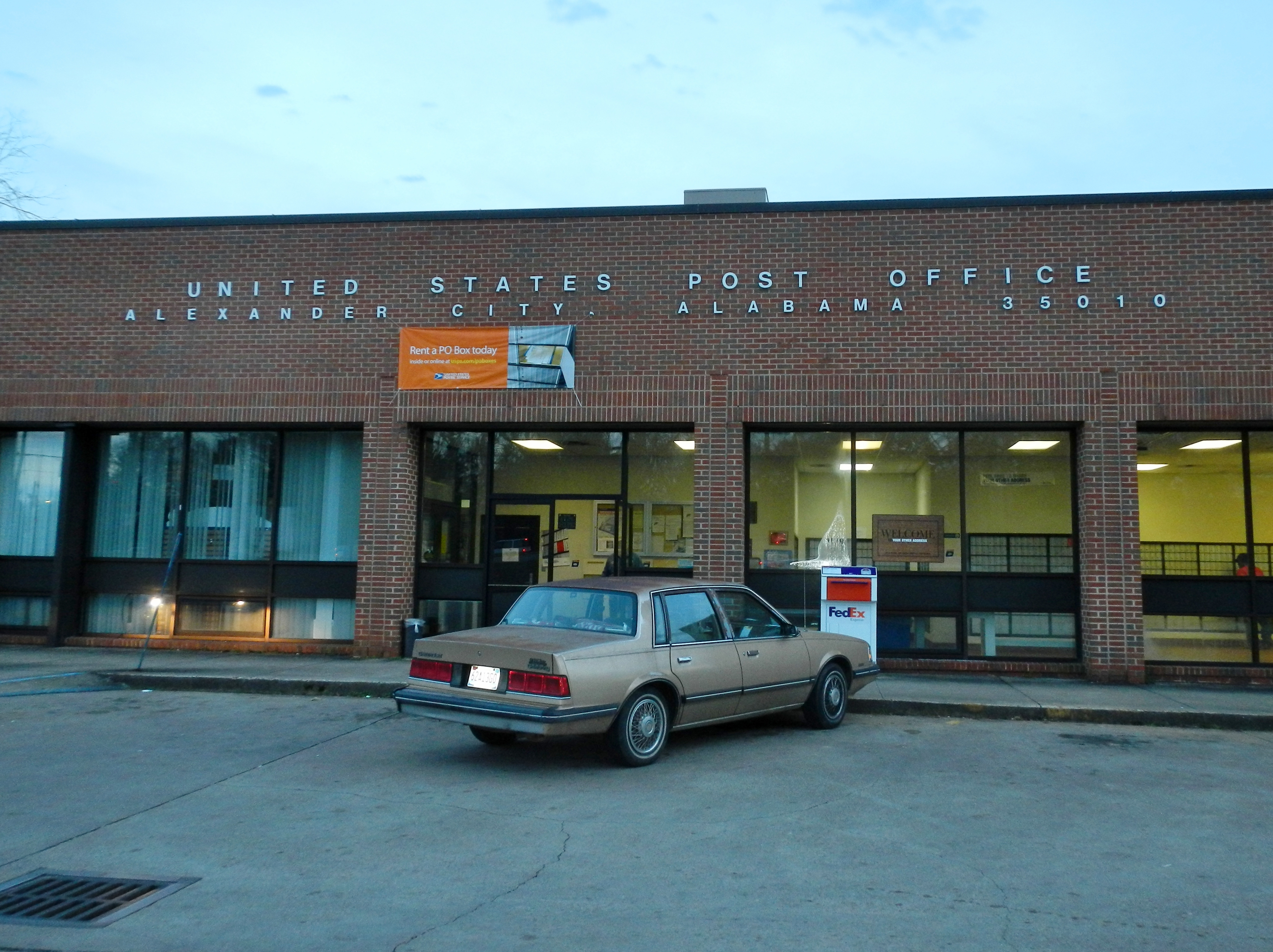
Alexander City Post Office (ZIP code: 35010)

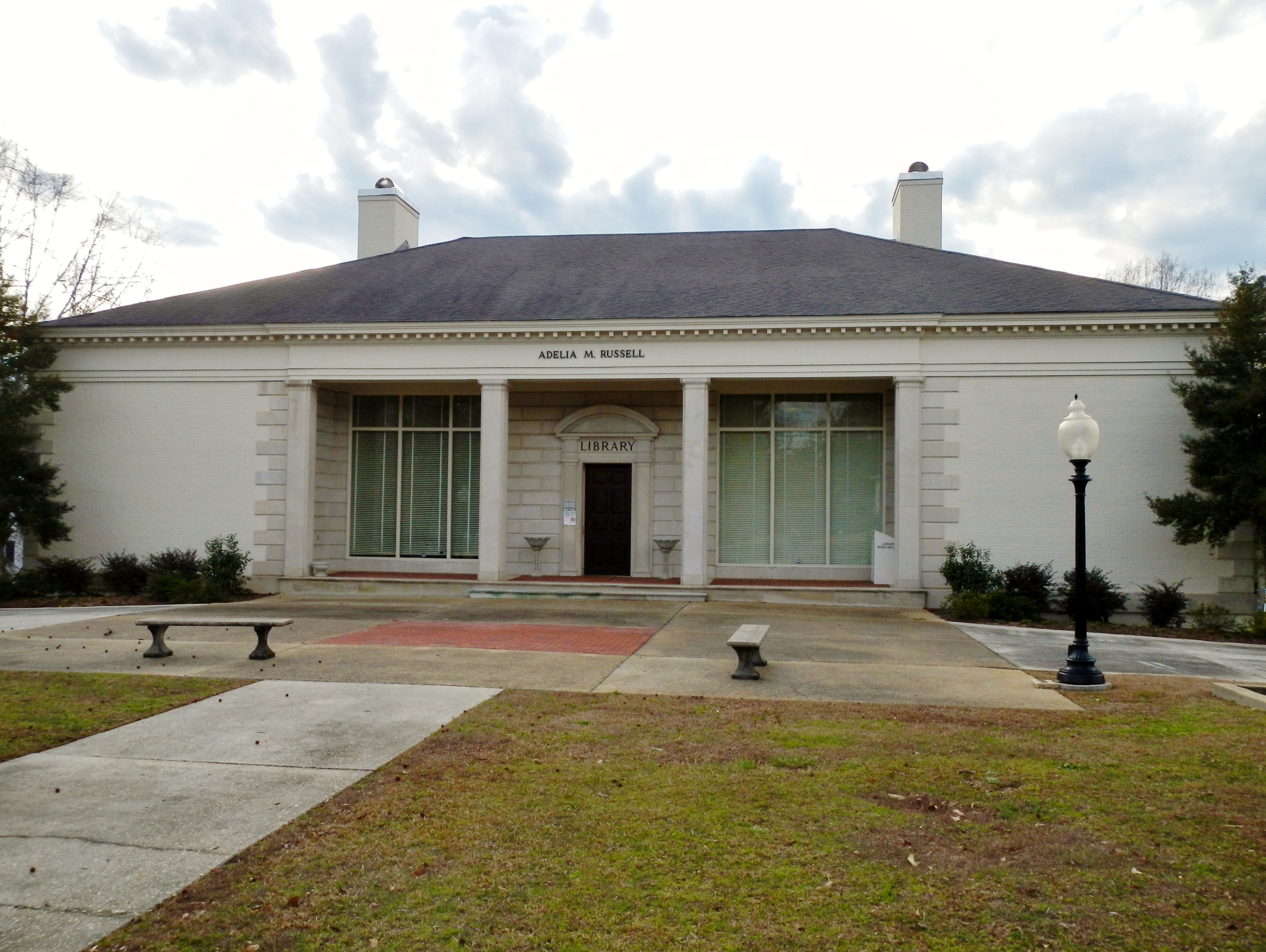
Adelia M. Russell Library

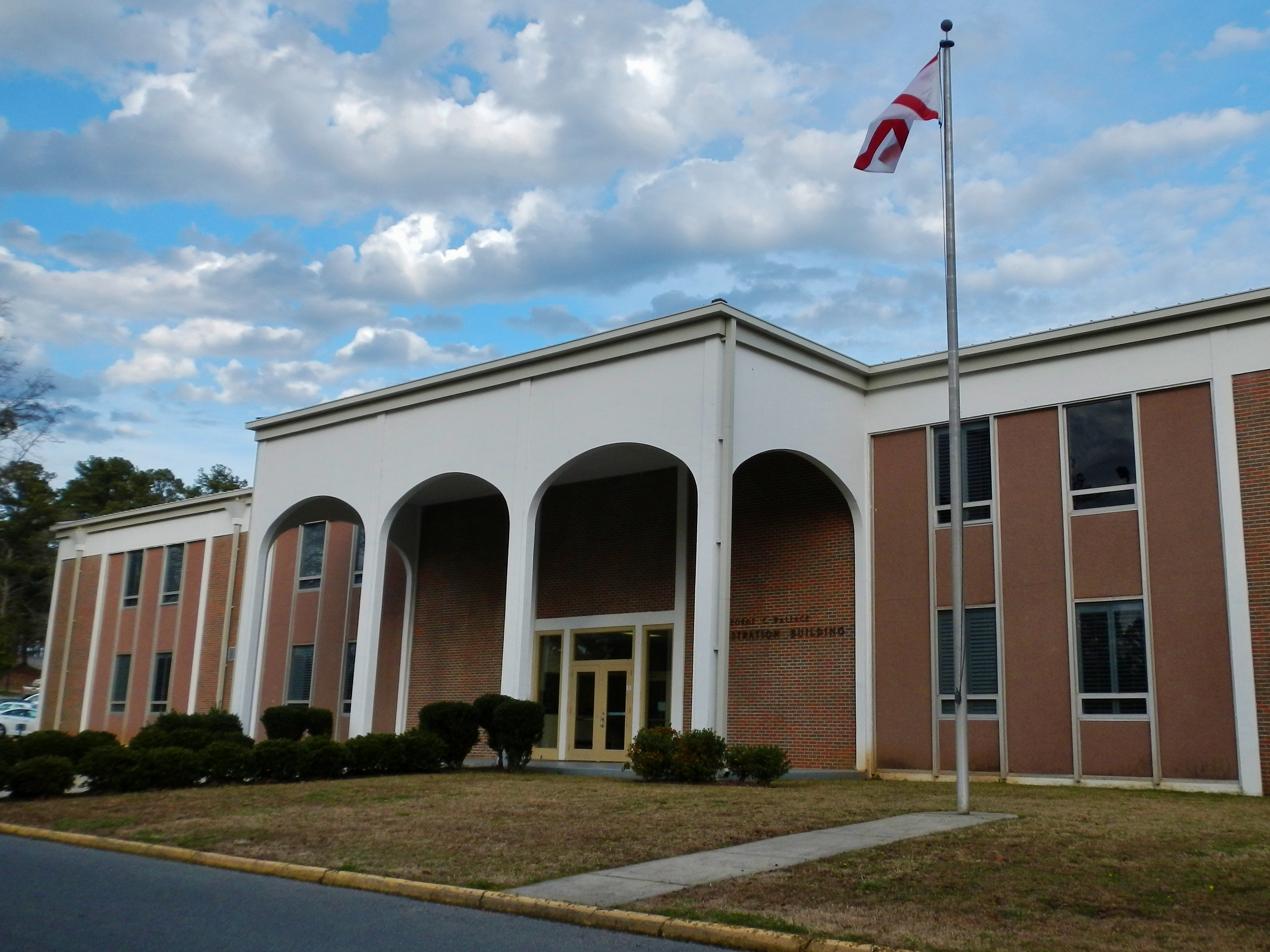
The George C. Wallace Administration Building located on the campus of Central Alabama Community College.

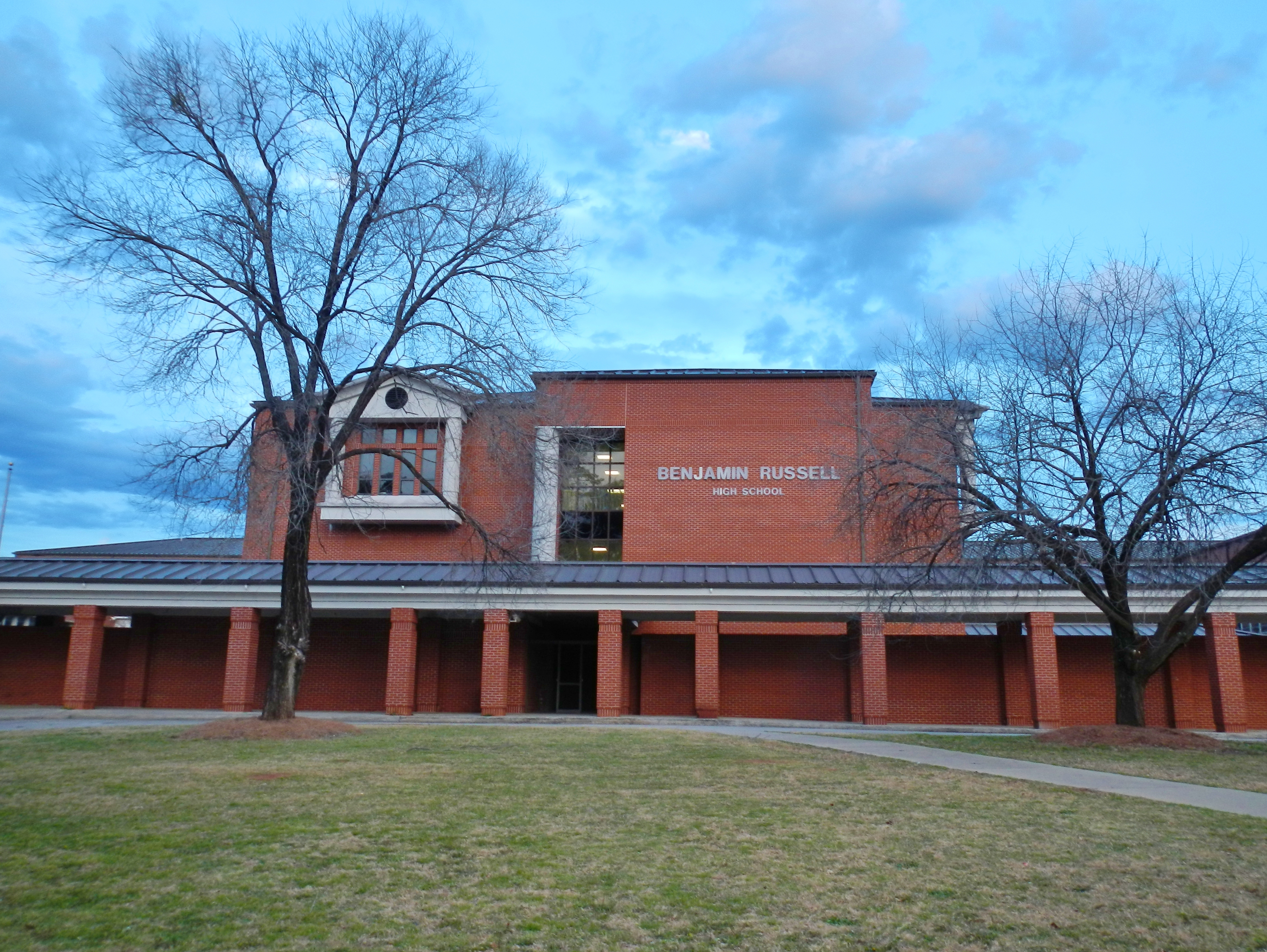
Benjamin Russell High School

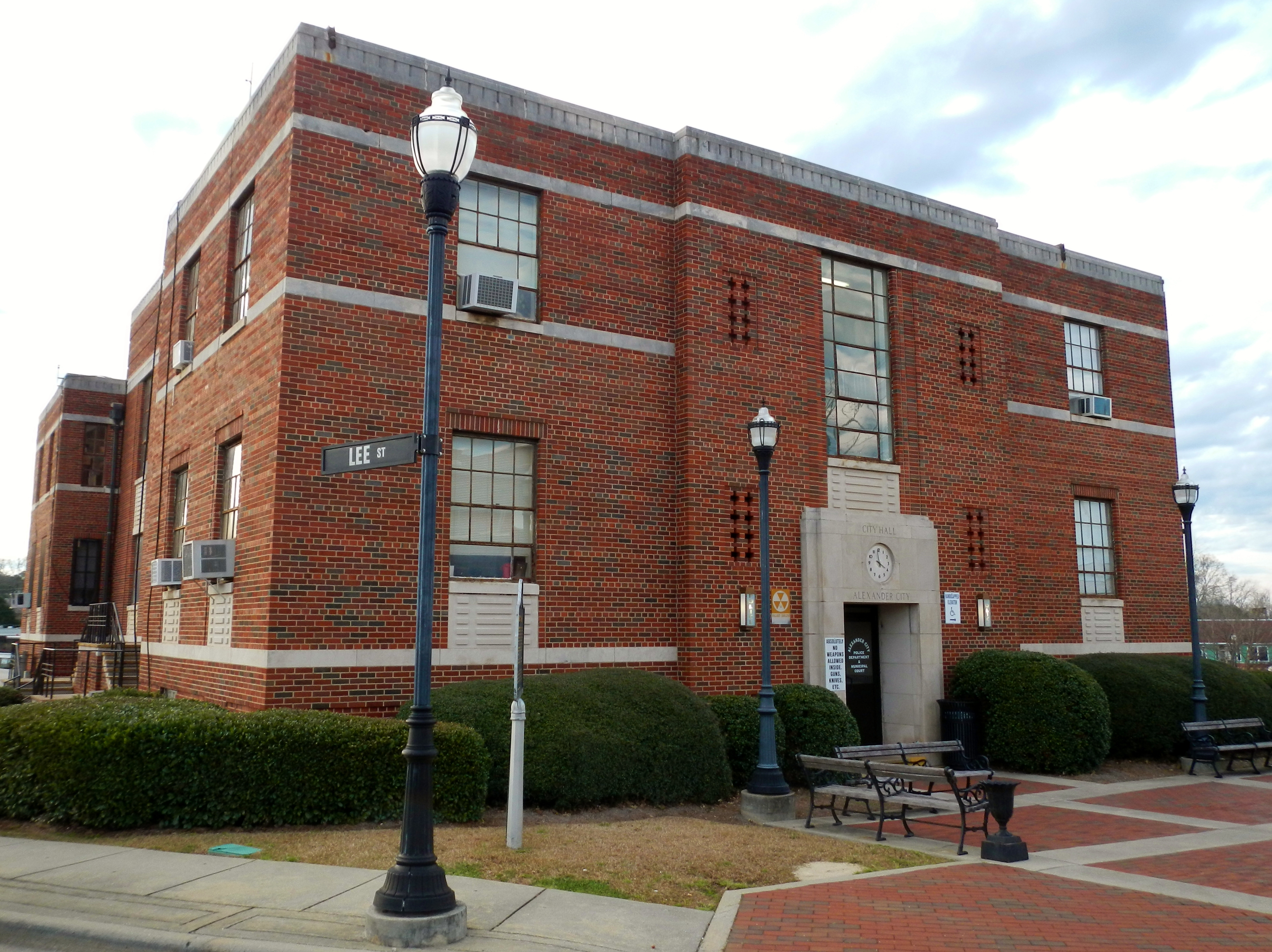
The old city hall building is now used as the Police Department and Municipal Court.

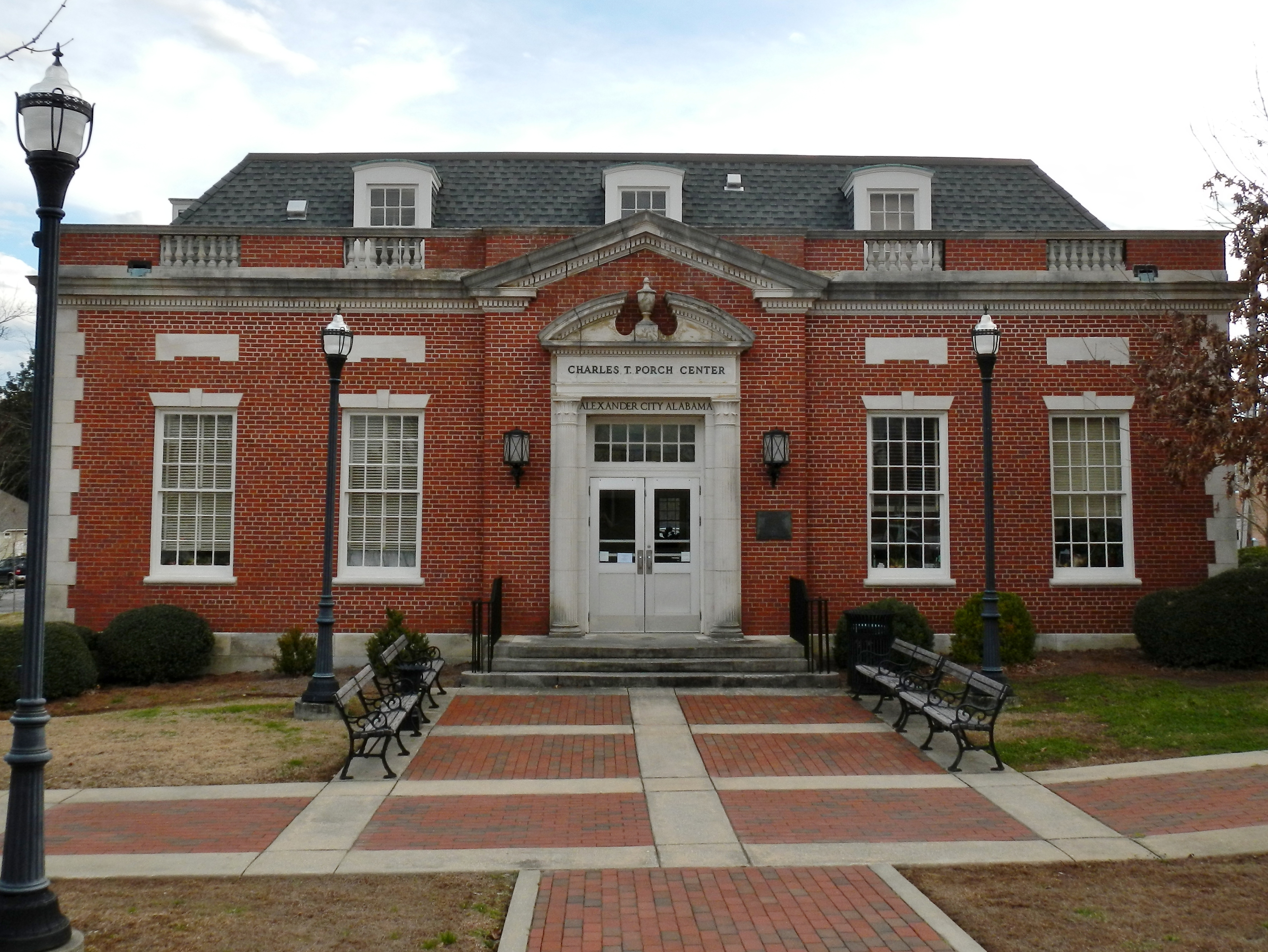
Originally built as the city post office, the Charles T. Porch Center is now used as a city community center.

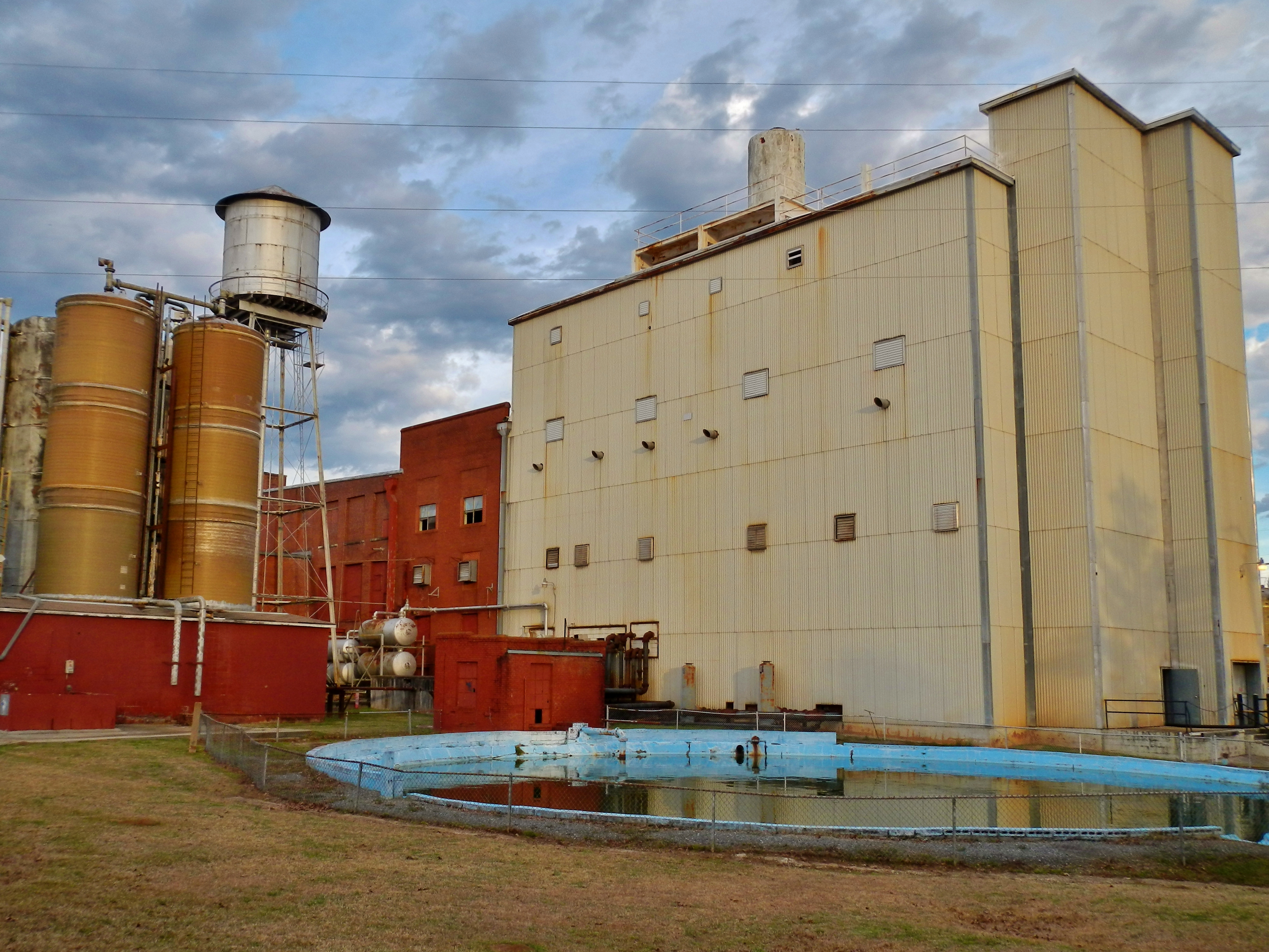
The Avondale Historic District was added to the National Register of Historic Places on August 9, 2005.

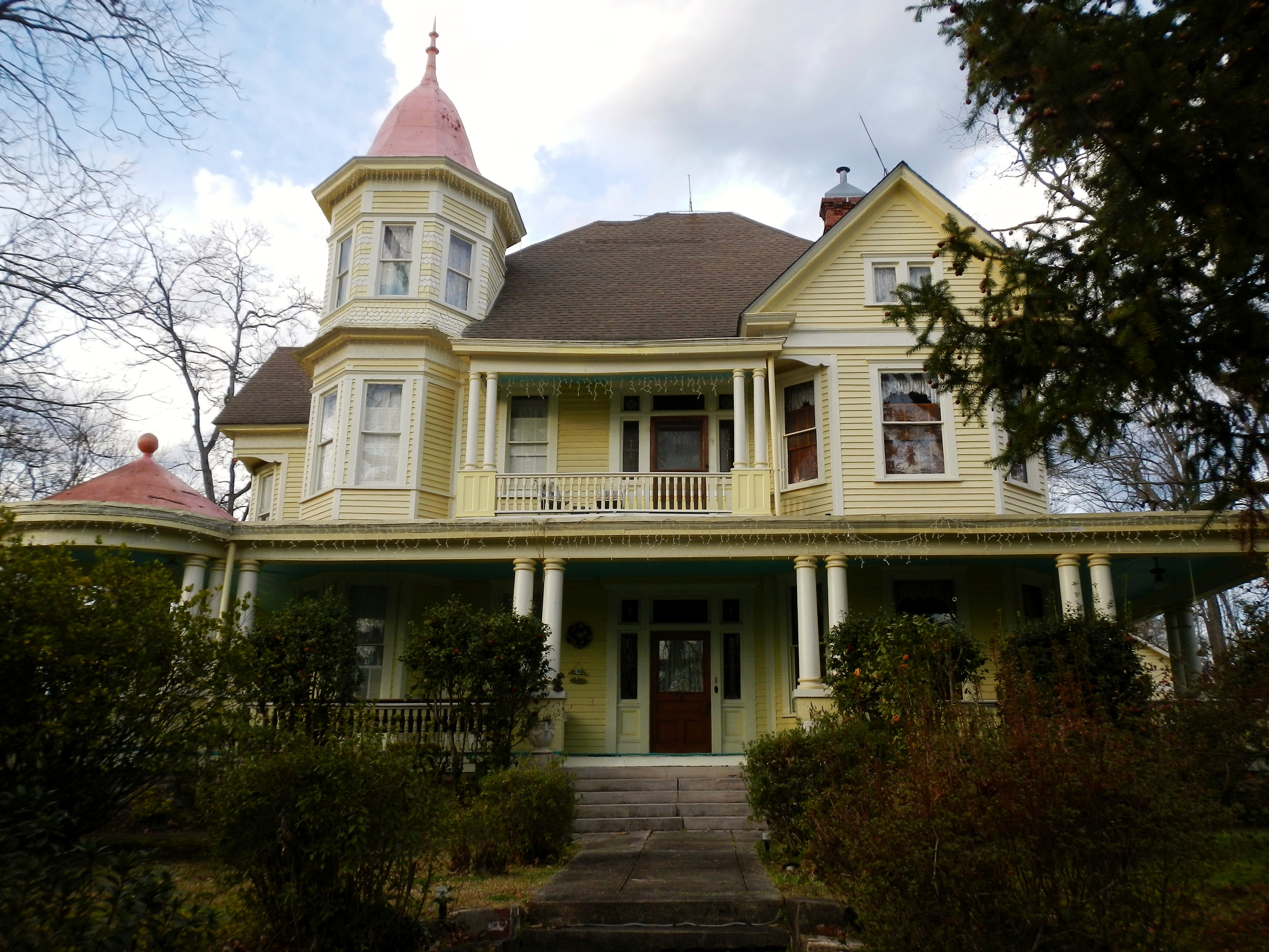
Built in 1890, the Reuben Herzfeld House was added to the National Register of Historic Places on August 22, 1995.

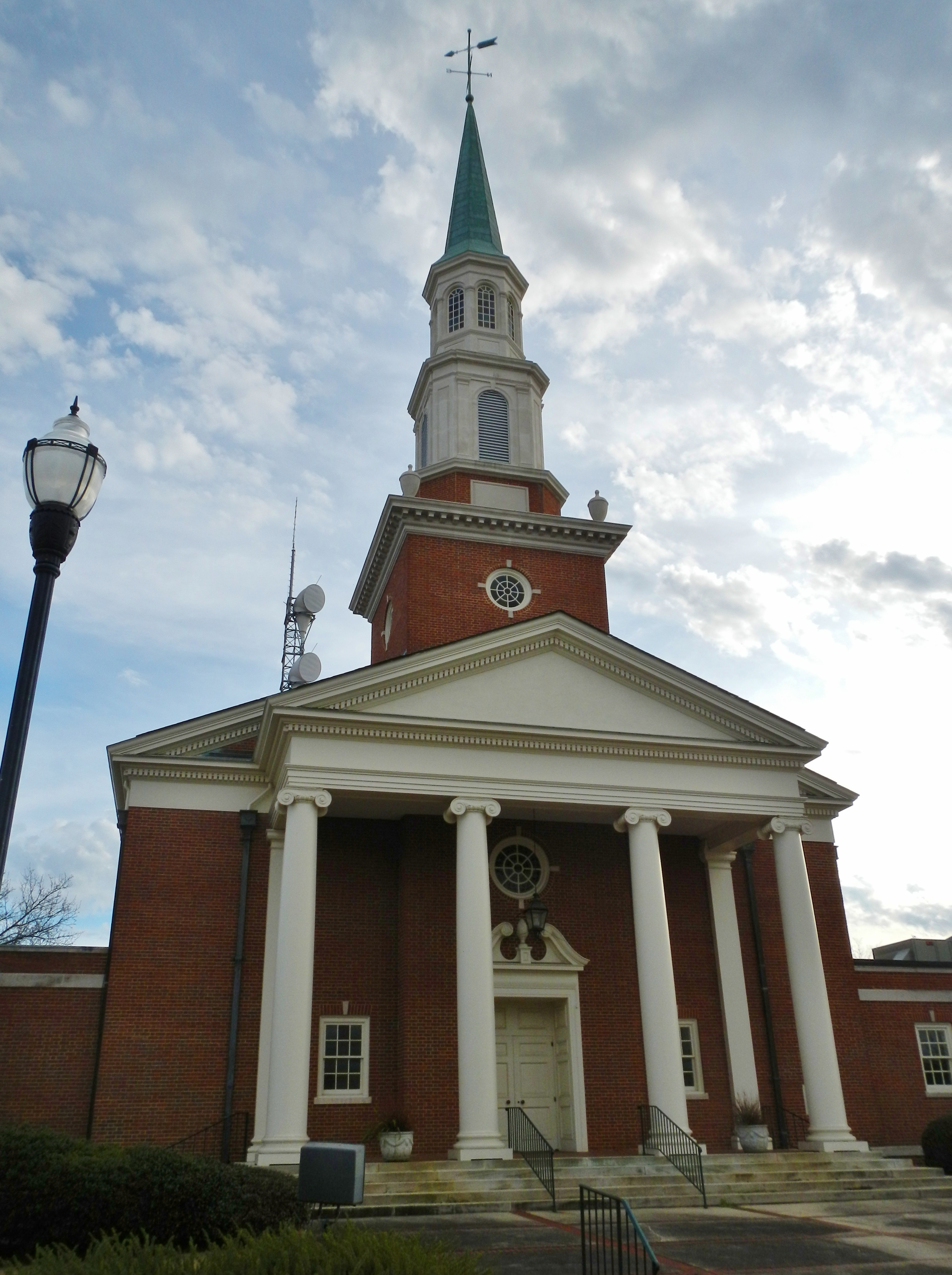
Alexander City First Baptist Church (Established in 1872)

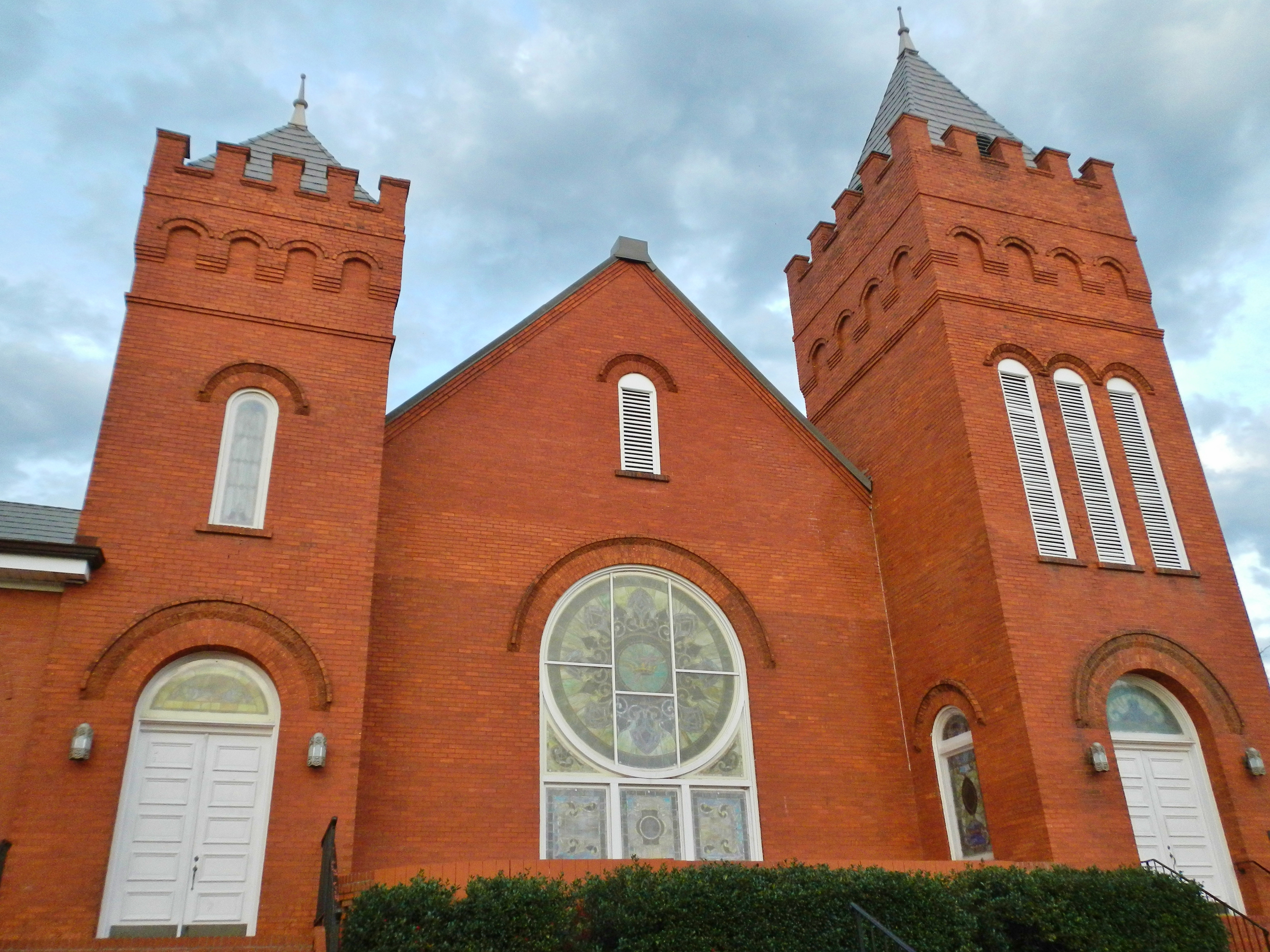
Alexander City First United Methodist Church (Established in 1872)

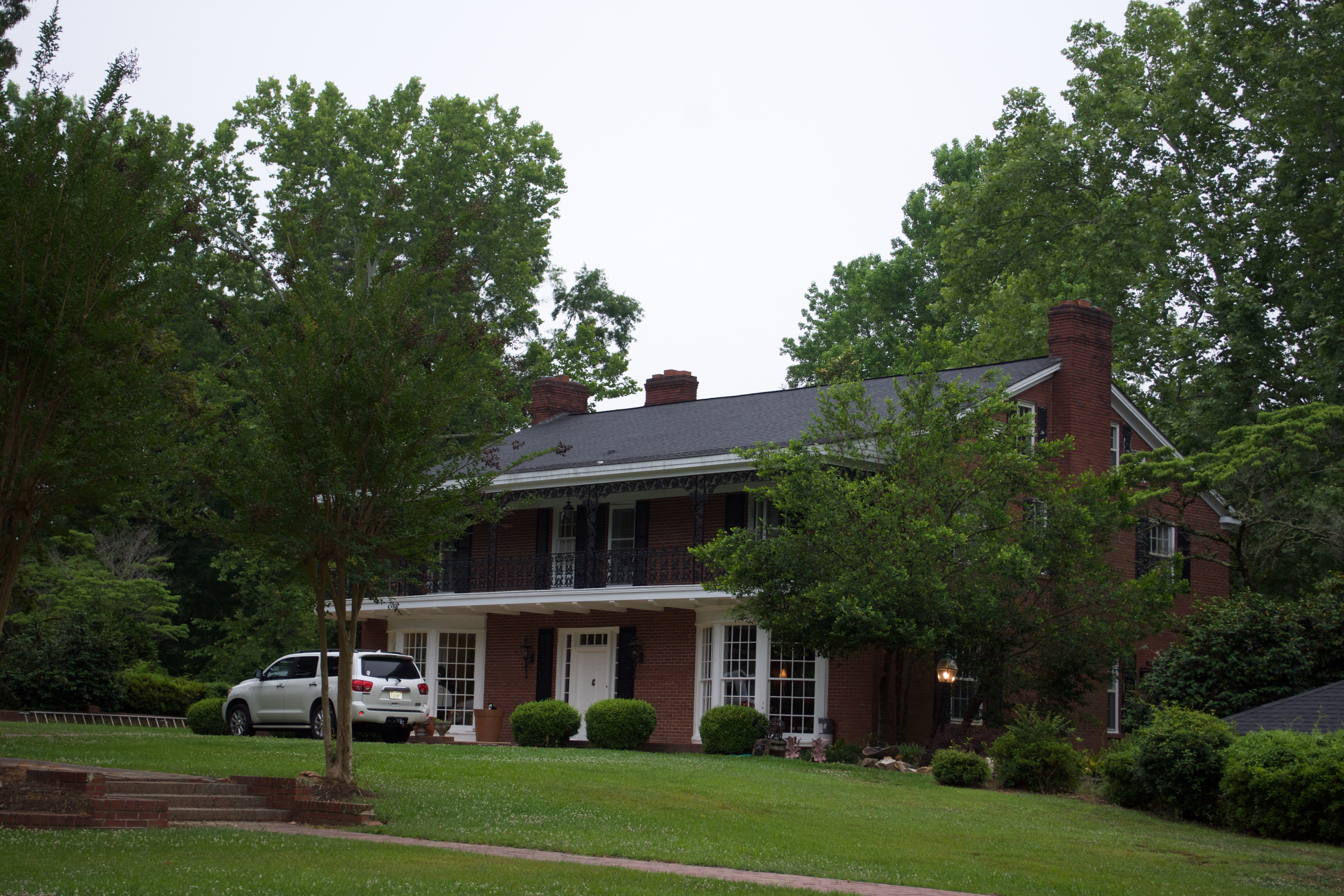
Robert & Adelia Russell House, Alexander City

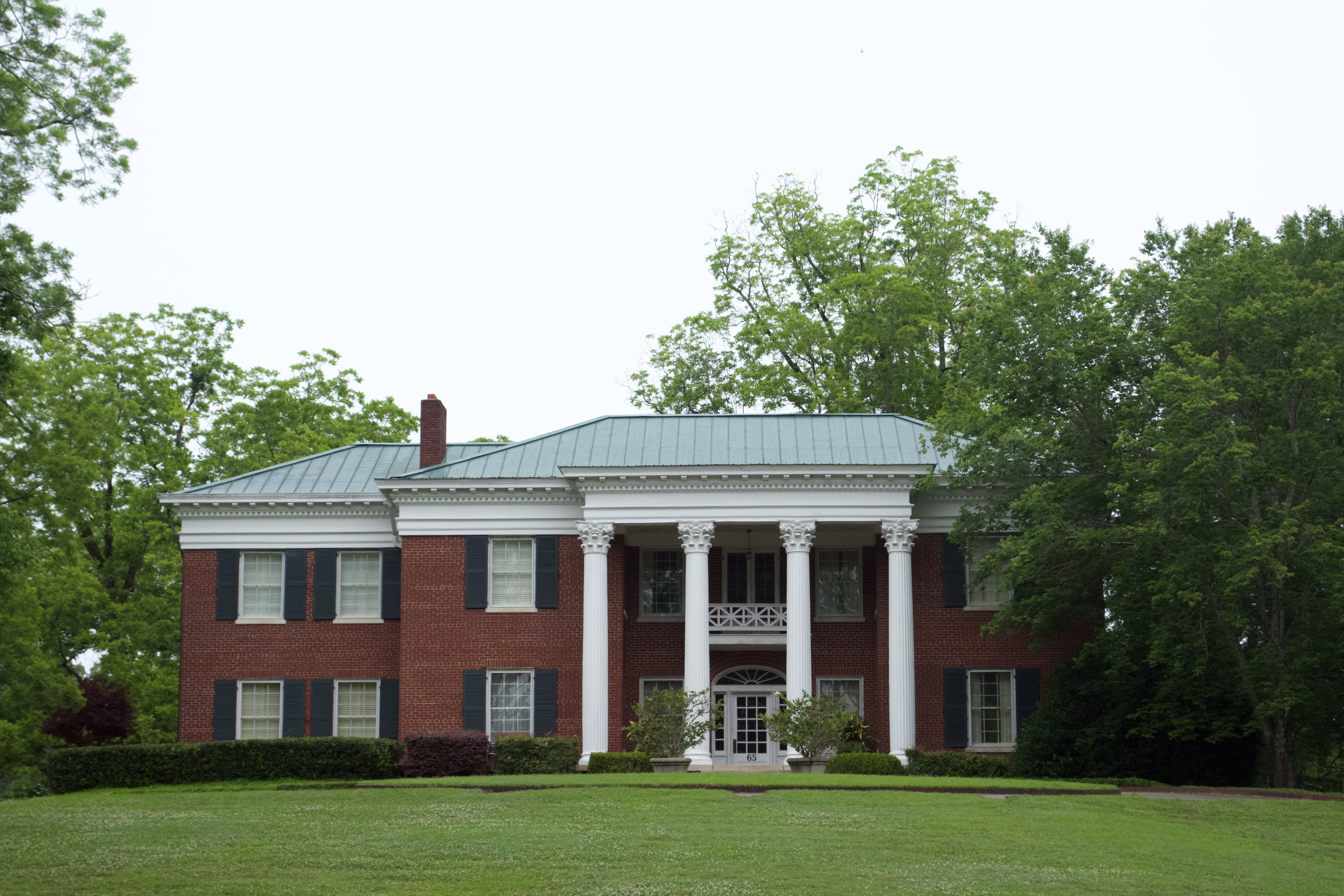
Benjamin & Roberta M. Russell House, Alexander City

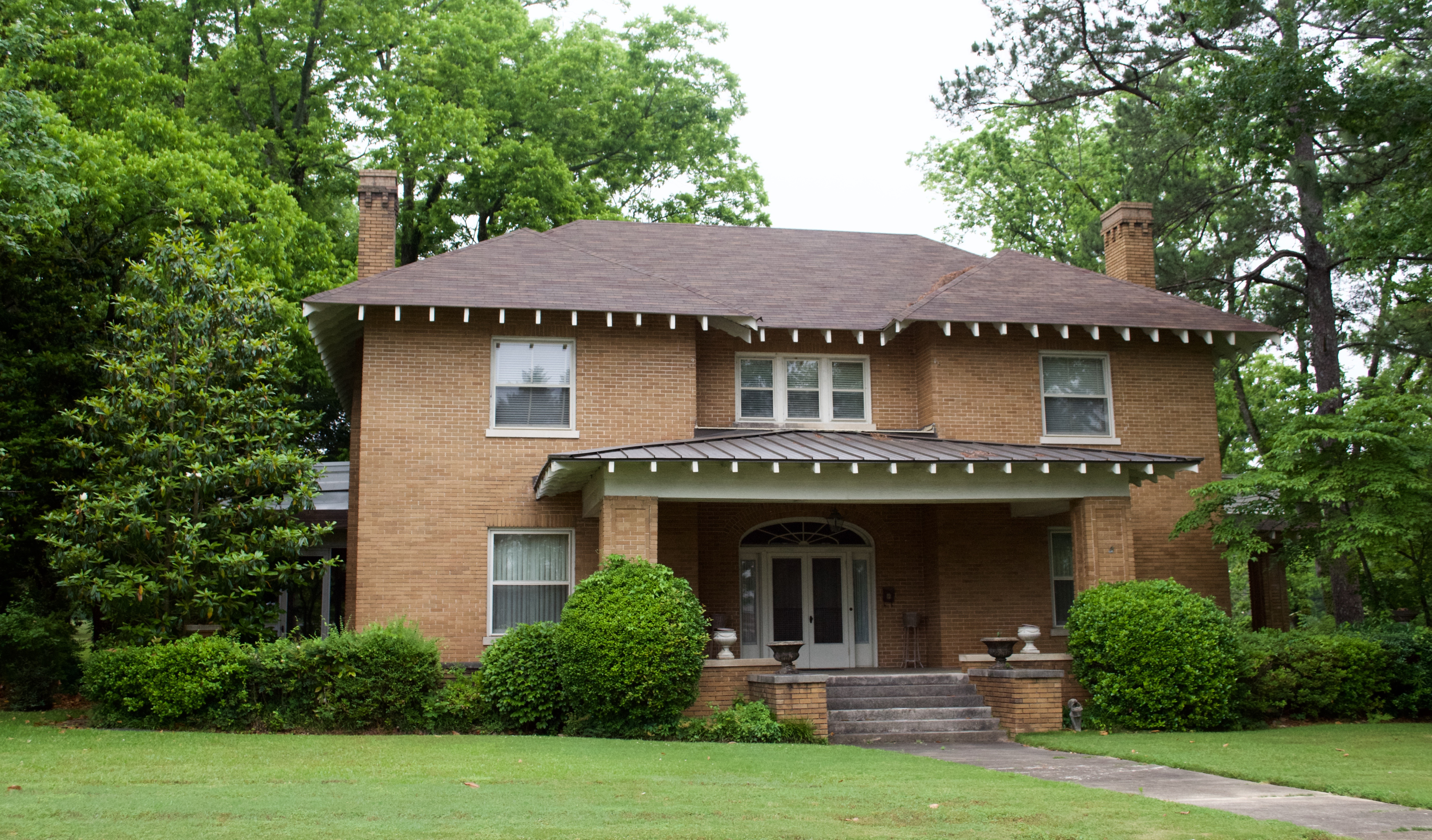
Thomas Commander Russell House, Alexander City

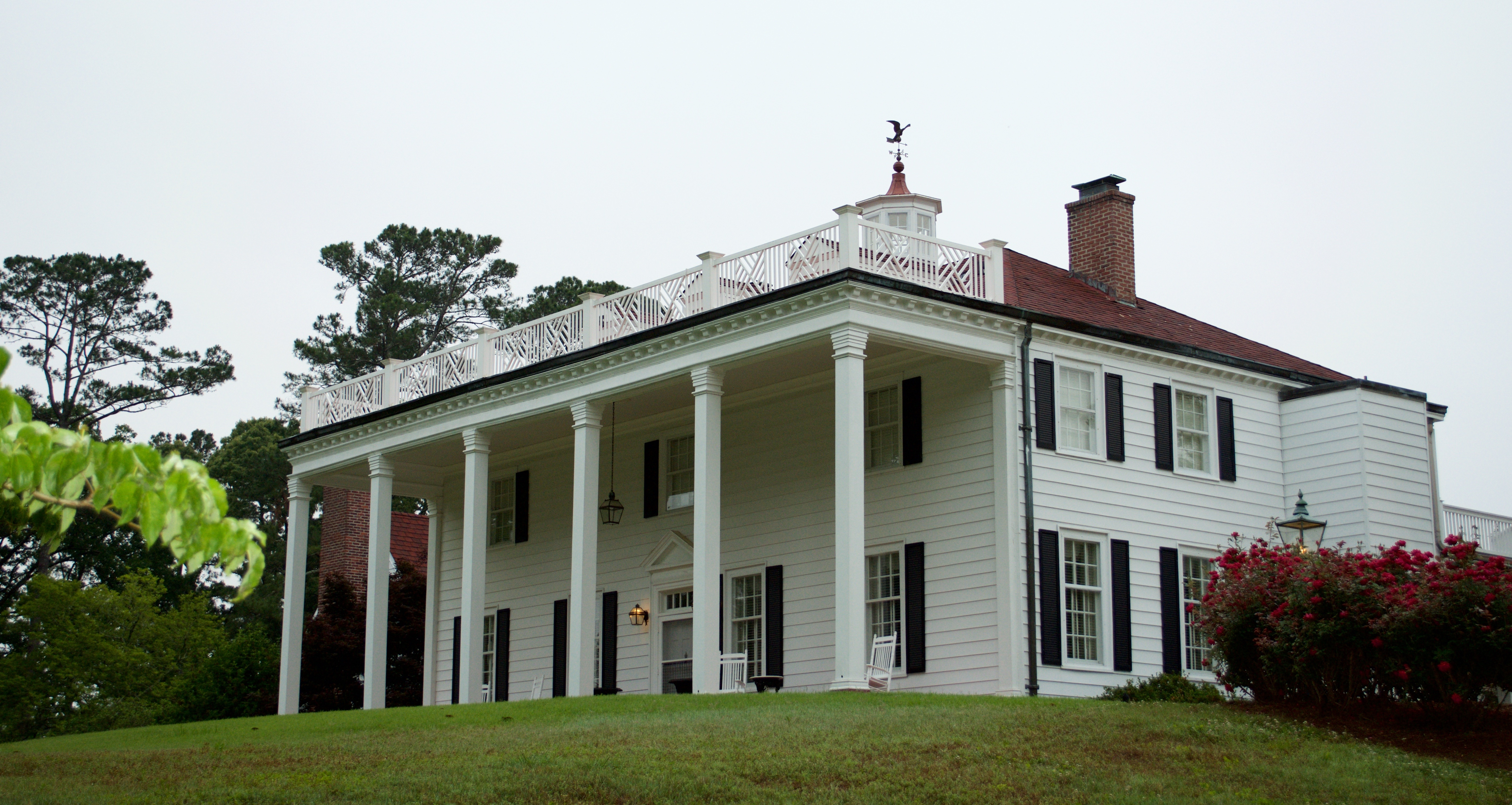
Thomas D. Russell House, Alexander City

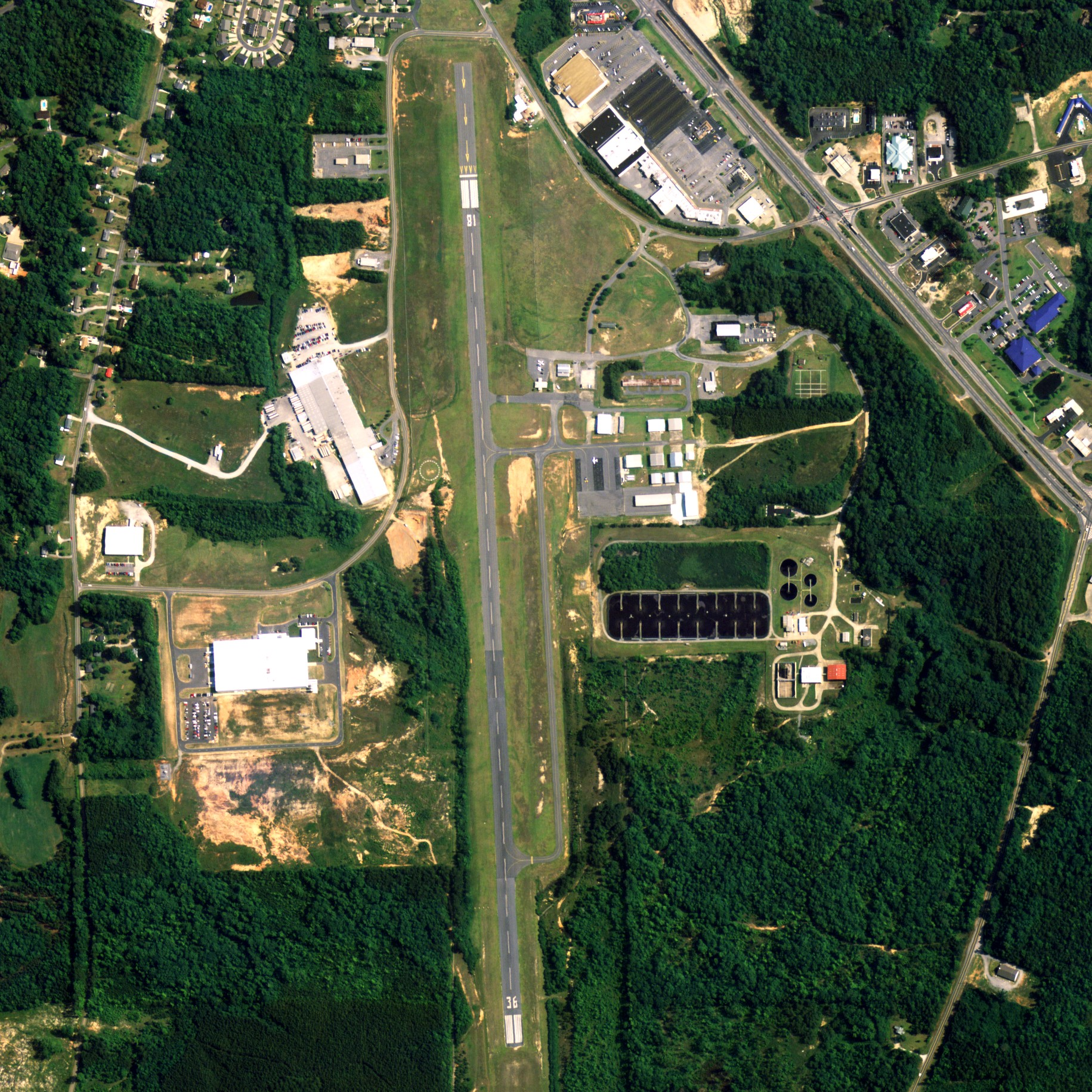
Thomas C. Russell Air Field, Alexander City

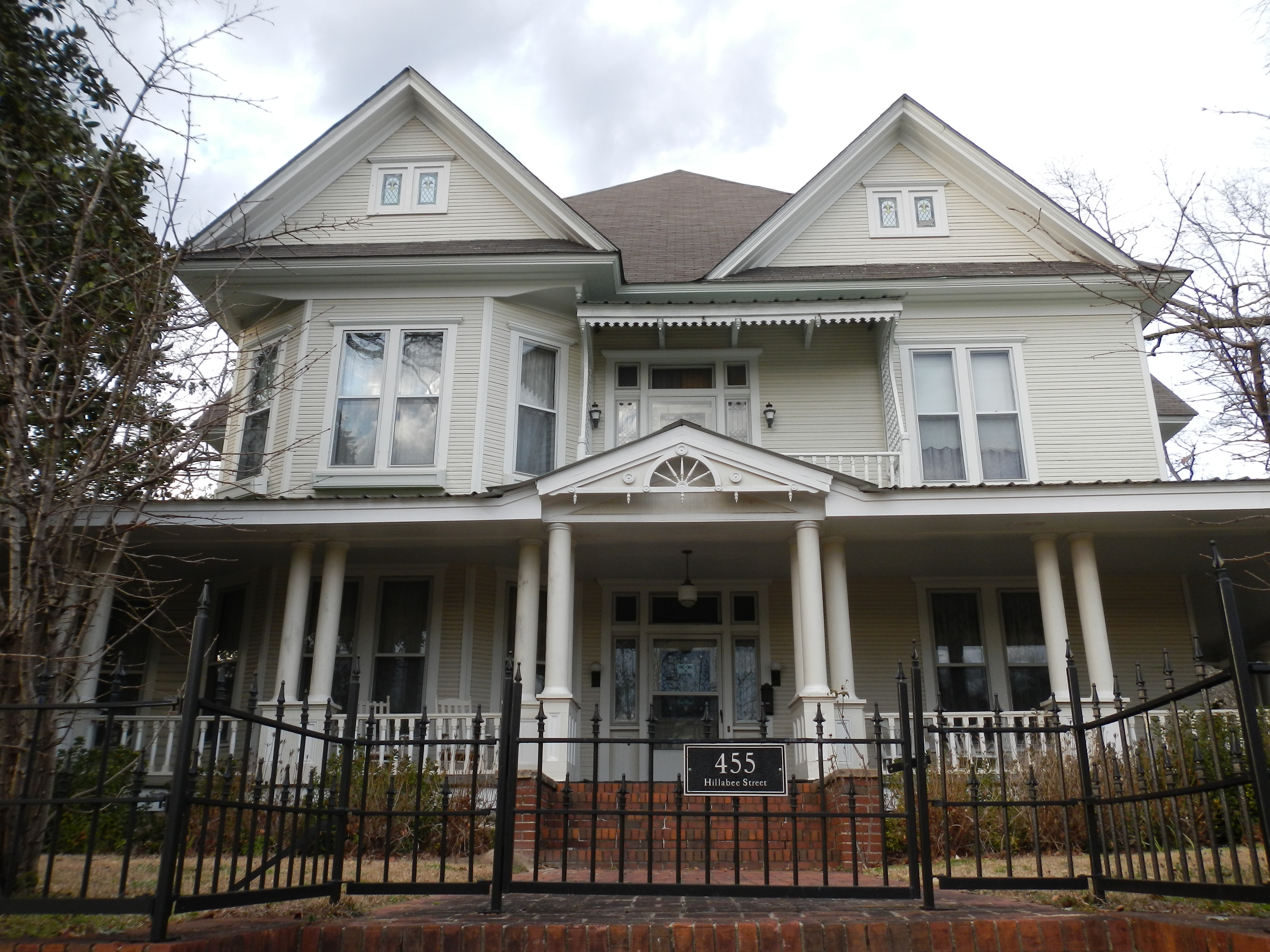
A.J. & Emma E. Thomas Coley House, Alexander City
