= Mobile metropolitan area =

Coordinates: 30°47′11″N 88°12′50″W

Mobile Metropolitan Area
- Metropolitan Statistical Area
- Mobile, Alabama; Metropolitan Statistical Area
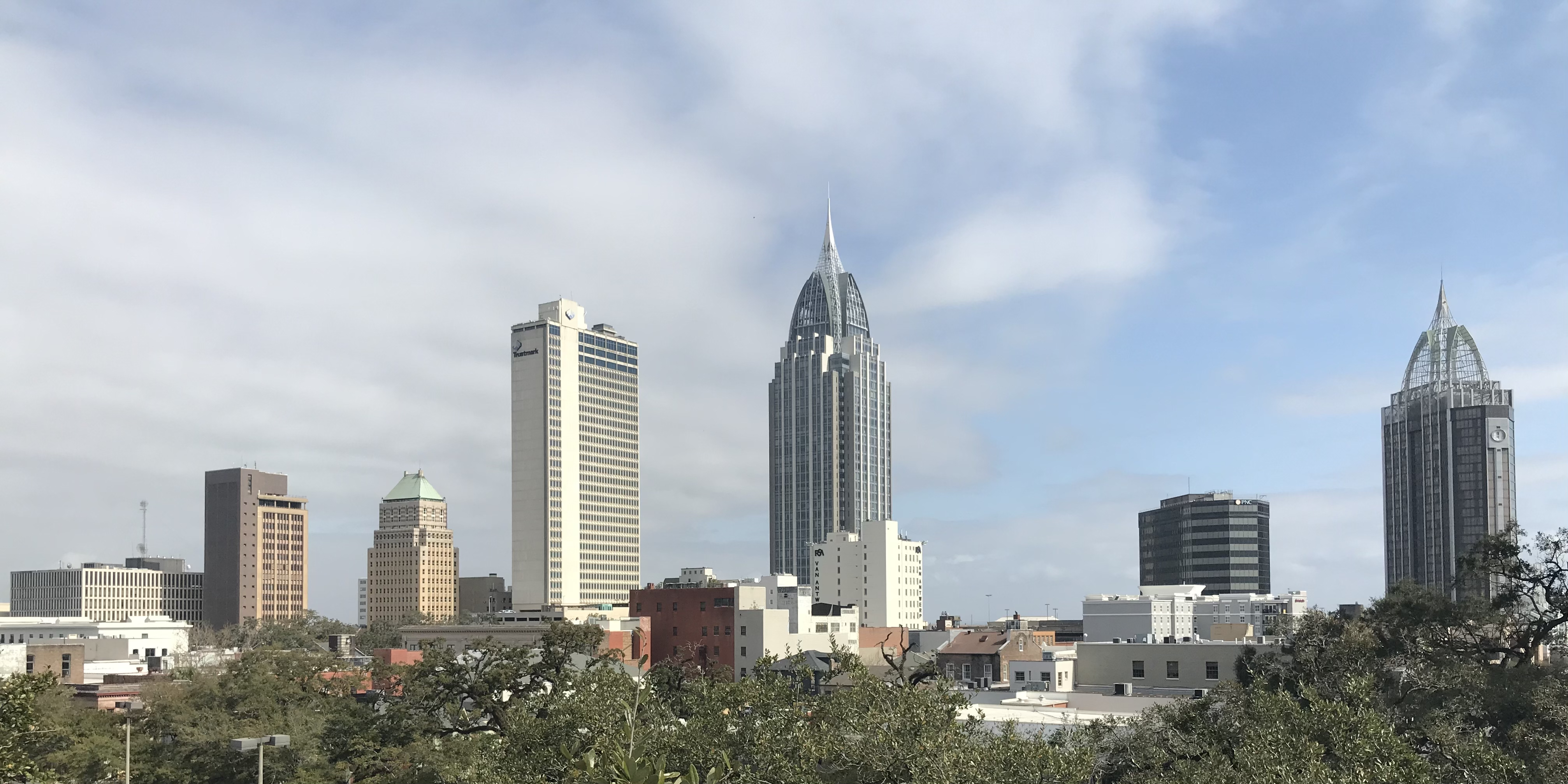
- Skyline of Mobile
Interactive Map of Mobile–Daphne–Fairhope, AL CSA
City of Mobile
Mobile, AL MSA
City of Daphne
City of Fairhope
City of Foley
Daphne–Fairhope–Foley, AL MSA
- Country: United States
- State: Alabama
- Largest city: Mobile
- Other cities: Prichard; Saraland; Fairhope; Daphne; Foley
- Time zone: UTC−6 (CST)
  - Summer (DST): UTC−5 (CDT)

The Mobile Metropolitan Area comprises Mobile in the southwest corner of Alabama in the United States. As of the 2020 census the metropolitan area had a population of 430,197. The Mobile metropolitan area is the third-largest metropolitan area in the state of Alabama, after Birmingham and Huntsville.

Washington County was part of the Mobile metropolitan area but was removed when the OMB released its statistical definitions effective July 2023.

The Mobile Metropolitan Area and Daphne–Fairhope–Foley Metropolitan Area, which comprises all of Baldwin County, together make up the Mobile–Daphne–Fairhope Combined Statistical Area, with a population in 2020 of 661,964.

Year	Mobile MSA	Daphne–Fairhope–Foley MSA	Total
2000 Census	399,843	140,415	540,258
2010 Census	412,992	182,265	595,257
2020 Census	430,197	231,767	661,964

== Counties ==
- Mobile–Daphne–Fairhope combined statistical area
  - Mobile metropolitan area
    - Mobile County
  - Daphne–Fairhope–Foley metropolitan area
    - Baldwin County

== Mobile Metropolitan Area ==
=== Mobile County communities ===
==== Places with more than 150,000 inhabitants ====
- Mobile (principal city)

==== Places with 10,000 to 35,000 inhabitants ====
- Prichard
- Saraland
- Tillmans Corner (unincorporated)

==== Places with 1,000 to 10,000 inhabitants ====
- Bayou La Batre
- Chickasaw
- Citronelle
- Creola
- Dauphin Island
- Grand Bay
- Satsuma
- Semmes
- Theodore
- Mount Vernon

==== Unincorporated places ====
- Alabama Port
- Axis
- Bucks
- Calvert
- Chunchula
- Coden
- Eight Mile
- Fernland
- Irvington
- Kushla
- Le Moyne
- Mauvilla
- Mon Louis
- St. Elmo
- Whistler

== Daphne–Fairhope–Foley Metropolitan Area ==
=== Baldwin County communities ===
==== Places with more than 25,000 inhabitants ====
- Daphne

==== Places with 10,000 to 25,000 inhabitants ====
- Fairhope
- Foley
- Gulf Shores
- Spanish Fort

==== Places with 1,000 to 10,000 inhabitants ====
- Bay Minette
- Orange Beach
- Robertsdale
- Loxley
- Elberta
- Point Clear
- Summerdale

==== Other communities ====
- Bon Secour
- Lillian
- Magnolia Springs
- Perdido
- Perdido Beach
- Silverhill
- Stapleton
- Stockton

== Transportation ==
- Interstate 10 (Which connects with Los Angeles and Jacksonville)
- Interstate 65 (Which connects to Chicago)
- Interstate 165
- U.S. Highway 31
- U.S. Highway 43
- U.S. Highway 45
- U.S. Highway 90
- U.S. Highway 98

== See also ==
- Alabama statistical areas
