= Satsuma City School System =

School district in Alabama, United States

Satsuma City School System is a school district in Mobile County, Alabama serving the city of Satsuma.

The Satsuma City School System is served by two schools, Robert E. Lee Elementary (K-6) and Satsuma High School (7-12). As of 2018 Dr. Bart Reeves, is the current Superintendent.

== History ==
Satsuma voted on April 12, 2011, to create its own school system and began the process of forming a school board with plans to start school in the fall of 2012. The Satsuma City Council received 21 applications for the five member board, and following two rounds of interviews the Satsuma Board of Education was formed with the following members being sworn in on June 7, 2011: Linda Robbins, James B. Woosley, Diane Keasler, Jimmy Upton and Pat Hicks.

The new board immediately began the work required to separate from the Mobile County Public School System. On April 5, 2012, the separation agreement between the two school boards was completed and signed. In June 2012, the U.S. Department of Justice granted Pre-Clearance to the board, officially establishing the Satsuma City School System.

Residents of Axis, Creola, and other areas of Mobile County not in the Satsuma city limits and formerly assigned to Satsuma schools were rezoned to North Mobile County K-8 School in Axis and Citronelle High School in Citronelle.

== Operations ==
As of 2013 non-residents must pay $850 per year per child to send their children to Satsuma schools. In 2012 the tuition was $650. As of 2013 about 100 students residing in Creola attended Satsuma schools.
