= Movico, Alabama =

- Census-designated place
- Coordinates: 31°03′46″N 88°01′36″W
- Country: United States
- State: Alabama
- County: Mobile

Area
  - Total: 0.78 sq mi (2.03 km^{2})
  - Land: 0.78 sq mi (2.03 km^{2})
  - Water: 0 sq mi (0.00 km^{2})
- Elevation: 56 ft (17 m)

Population (2020)
  - Total: 291
  - Density: 371.7/sq mi (143.51/km^{2})
- Time zone: UTC-6 (Central (CST))
  - Summer (DST): UTC-5 (CDT)
- Area code: 251
- GNIS feature ID: 2628599
- FIPS code: 01-52680

Movico is a census-designated place and unincorporated community in northeast Mobile County, Alabama, United States. Its population was 291 as of the 2020 census. The town was heavily damaged by an EF2 tornado on January 12, 2023.

== Geography ==
Movico is in northeastern Mobile County, along U.S. Route 43. It is 30 miles (48 km) north of Mobile and 1 mile (1.6 km) south of Mount Vernon.

== Demographics ==
Historical population
Census	Pop.	Note	%±
2010	305		—
2020	291		−4.6%
U.S. Decennial Census

Movico was listed as a census designated place in the 2010 U.S. census.

Movico CDP, Alabama – Racial and ethnic composition Note: the US Census treats Hispanic/Latino as an ethnic category. This table excludes Latinos from the racial categories and assigns them to a separate category. Hispanics/Latinos may be of any race.
Race / Ethnicity (NH = Non-Hispanic)	Pop 2010	Pop 2020	% 2010	% 2020
White alone (NH)	8	21	2.62%	7.22%
Black or African American alone (NH)	295	243	96.72%	83.51%
Native American or Alaska Native alone (NH)	1	6	0.33%	2.06%
Asian alone (NH)	0	0	0.00%	0.00%
Native Hawaiian or Pacific Islander alone (NH)	0	0	0.00%	0.00%
Other race alone (NH)	0	0	0.00%	0.00%
Mixed race or Multiracial (NH)	1	16	0.33%	5.50%
Hispanic or Latino (any race)	0	5	0.00%	1.72%
Total	305	291	100.00%	100.00%

== Education ==
Residents are zoned to Mobile County Public School System campuses. Residents are zoned to Citronelle High School. The community was formerly in the attendance boundary of the Belsaw/Mr. Vernon K-8 school in Mount Vernon, which closed in 2016.
