= Creola, Alabama =

City in Alabama, United States

- City
- Seal

- Location in Mobile County, Alabama
- Coordinates: 30°52′43″N 88°00′37″W
- Country: United States
- State: Alabama
- County: Mobile

Government
  - Mayor: Don Nelson
  - Council Member: [[Mark Howell]

Area
  - Total: 16.65 sq mi (43.13 km^{2})
  - Land: 15.68 sq mi (40.62 km^{2})
  - Water: 0.97 sq mi (2.52 km^{2})
- Elevation: 20 ft (6.1 m)

Population (2020)
  - Total: 1,936
  - Density: 123.5/sq mi (47.67/km^{2})
- Time zone: UTC-6 (Central (CST))
  - Summer (DST): UTC-5 (CDT)
- ZIP code: 36525
- Area code: 251
- FIPS code: 01-18304
- GNIS feature ID: 2404149
- Website: www.cityofcreola.org

Creola is a city in Mobile County, Alabama, United States. Incorporated in 1978, the city had a population of 1,936 at the 2020 census. It is part of the Mobile metropolitan area.

== History ==
Creola was named for the first settler in the area, who was Creole. The town of Creola shows up intermittently on some maps from the 1870s and on a rail line, such as the Mobile and Alabama Grand Trunk line. A post office was established in the locale in 1885. Creola was incorporated on February 14, 1978.

In 2013 the governments of Creola and Saraland were taking steps in a possible merger.

== Geography ==
Creola is located in northeastern Mobile County. It is bordered to the west by the city of Saraland and to the southwest by the city of Satsuma. The eastern border of the city is the Mobile River, which forms the Baldwin County line. U.S. Route 43 passes through the community, leading south 14 miles (23 km) to Mobile and north the same distance to Mount Vernon. Interstate 65 crosses Creola as well, with access from Exit 19 (U.S. 43) and Exit 22 (Sailor Road). I-65 leads south to Mobile and northeast 153 miles (246 km) to Montgomery.

According to the U.S. Census Bureau, Creola has a total area of 16.7 square miles (43 km^{2}), of which 15.7 square miles (41 km^{2}) are land and 1.0 square mile (2.6 km^{2}), or 5.84%, are water.

== Demographics ==
Historical population
Census	Pop.	Note	%±
1970	472		—
1980	1,652		250.0%
1990	1,896		14.8%
2000	2,002		5.6%
2010	1,926		−3.8%
2020	1,936		0.5%
U.S. Decennial Census

=== Racial and ethnic composition ===
Creola city, Alabama – Racial and ethnic composition Note: the US Census treats Hispanic/Latino as an ethnic category. This table excludes Latinos from the racial categories and assigns them to a separate category. Hispanics/Latinos may be of any race. Race and ethnicity was not surveyed for populations under 2,500 in the 1980 census and under 1,000 in 1990 census.
Race / Ethnicity (NH = Non-Hispanic)	Pop 1990	Pop 2000	Pop 2010	Pop 2020	% 1990	% 2000	% 2010	% 2020
White alone (NH)	1,632	1,721	1,614	1,516	86.08%	85.96%	83.80%	78.31%
Black or African American alone (NH)	226	198	188	215	11.92%	9.89%	9.76%	11.11%
Native American or Alaska Native alone (NH)	29	29	31	45	1.53%	1.45%	1.61%	2.32%
Asian alone (NH)	1	2	2	3	0.05%	0.10%	0.10%	0.15%
Native Hawaiian or Pacific Islander alone (NH)	x	0	1	1	x	0.00%	0.05%	0.05%
Other race alone (NH)	0	2	1	6	0.00%	0.10%	0.05%	0.31%
Mixed race or Multiracial (NH)	x	37	30	123	x	1.85%	1.56%	6.35%
Hispanic or Latino (any race)	8	13	59	27	0.42%	0.65%	3.06%	1.39%
Total	1,896	2,002	1,926	1,936	100.00%	100.00%	100.00%	100.00%

=== 2020 census ===
As of the 2020 census, there were 1,936 people, 774 households, and 447 families residing in the city. The median age was 43.1 years. 21.2% of residents were under the age of 18 and 18.3% of residents were 65 years of age or older. For every 100 females there were 94.8 males, and for every 100 females age 18 and over there were 96.9 males age 18 and over.

34.1% of residents lived in urban areas, while 65.9% lived in rural areas.

There were 774 households in Creola, of which 32.4% had children under the age of 18 living in them. Of all households, 55.0% were married-couple households, 17.3% were households with a male householder and no spouse or partner present, and 23.0% were households with a female householder and no spouse or partner present. About 24.0% of all households were made up of individuals and 8.9% had someone living alone who was 65 years of age or older.

There were 829 housing units, of which 6.6% were vacant. The homeowner vacancy rate was 0.6% and the rental vacancy rate was 7.5%.

=== 2010 census ===
As of the census of 2010, there were 1,926 people, 692 households, and 519 families residing in the town. The population density was 131.9 inhabitants per square mile (50.9/km^{2}). There were 775 housing units at an average density of 53.1 per square mile (20.5/km^{2}). The racial makeup of the town was 84.7% White, 9.8% Black or African American, 1.8% Native American, 0.1% Asian, 1.9% from other races, and 1.7% from two or more races. 3.1% of the population were Hispanic or Latino of any race.

There were 692 households, out of which 34.0% had children under the age of 18 living with them, 55.3% were married couples living together, 12.9% had a female householder with no husband present, and 25.0% were non-families. 18.4% of all households were made up of individuals, and 6.6% had someone living alone who was 65 years of age or older. The average household size was 2.78 and the average family size was 3.13.

In the town the population was spread out, with 25.2% under the age of 18, 11.3% from 18 to 24, 26.1% from 25 to 44, 26.2% from 45 to 64, and 11.2% who were 65 years of age or older. The median age was 35.6 years. For every 100 females, there were 108.2 males. For every 100 females age 18 and over, there were 110.7 males.

The median income for a household in the town was $41,786, and the median income for a family was $48,009. Males had a median income of $45,729 versus $36,902 for females. The per capita income for the town was $19,202. About 14.7% of families and 18.3% of the population were below the poverty line, including 29.1% of those under age 18 and 14.4% of those age 65 or over.

=== 2000 census ===
As of the census of 2000, there were 2,002 people, 718 households, and 567 families residing in the town. The population density was 137.1 inhabitants per square mile (52.9/km^{2}). There were 796 housing units at an average density of 54.5 per square mile (21.0/km^{2}). The racial makeup of the town was 86.36% White, 9.89% Black or African American, 1.45% Native American, 0.10% Asian, 0.35% from other races, and 1.85% from two or more races. 0.65% of the population were Hispanic or Latino of any race.

There were 718 households, out of which 40.7% had children under the age of 18 living with them, 59.9% were married couples living together, 14.8% had a female householder with no husband present, and 20.9% were non-families. 17.1% of all households were made up of individuals, and 5.8% had someone living alone who was 65 years of age or older. The average household size was 2.79 and the average family size was 3.15.

In the town the population was spread out, with 29.2% under the age of 18, 9.6% from 18 to 24, 29.7% from 25 to 44, 22.3% from 45 to 64, and 9.2% who were 65 years of age or older. The median age was 34 years. For every 100 females, there were 93.8 males. For every 100 females age 18 and over, there were 95.9 males.

The median income for a household in the town was $35,517, and the median income for a family was $38,942. Males had a median income of $35,658 versus $19,911 for females. The per capita income for the town was $14,956. About 14.3% of families and 16.0% of the population were below the poverty line, including 18.5% of those under age 18 and 19.9% of those age 65 or over.

== Education ==
Mobile County Public School System operates public schools. Students are zoned to North Mobile County K-8 School, previously North Mobile County Middle School, near Axis CDP. Creola students go to Citronelle High School in Citronelle.

=== History of schools ===
On September 7, 2010, North Mobile County Middle School opened, replacing the role of Adams Middle School in Saraland, because residents outside of Saraland are no longer zoned to Adams Middle. This rezoning affected residents in Creola, who were newly assigned to North Mobile County.

Prior to the 2012 split of the City of Satsuma from the Mobile County system, Creola was zoned to Satsuma schools, including Satsuma High School. In 2011 Renee Busbee of the Mobile Press-Register said that residents of Creola may be rezoned to Blount, Citronelle, and/or Vigor high schools.

Ultimately Creola, without an elementary school after the departure of Satsuma schools, was rezoned to North Mobile County, converted into a K-8, and Citronelle High. Any Creola residents wishing to send their children to Satsuma schools would be required to pay tuition. As of 2013 about 100 students residing in Creola attended Satsuma schools.

Due to the distance to Citronelle High (the distance by bus is about 30 minutes), several area parents wanted an annexation to the City of Satsuma and/or a partnership with the Satsuma school system. In 2013 a member of the Creola city council, Tonya Moss, stated that the city has "a bond with Satsuma" and that most of the council's members had graduated from Satsuma High. By 2013 there were discussions regarding a possible educational partnership between representatives of the two cities, in which the Creola city government would pay the City of Satsuma instead of Mobile County to educate its children.

== Transportation ==
Intercity bus service is provided by Greyhound Lines.
