= Satsuma High School =

Location
- 1 Gator Circle; Satsuma, Alabama 36572; United States
- 30°50′49″N 88°03′29″W

Information
- School type: Public
- Established: 1958 (68 years ago)
- School district: Satsuma City School System; Mobile County Public School System
- CEEB code: 012383
- Principal: Dr.Jason Golden
- Teaching staff: 42.50 (FTE)
- Grades: 7–12
- Enrollment: 731 (2023–2024)
- Student to teacher ratio: 17.20
- Colors: Maroon and white
- Mascot: Gator
- Team name: Gators
- Website: shs.satsumaschools.com

Satsuma High School is a public high school (grades 7–12) in Satsuma, Alabama, United States. It is a part of the Satsuma City School System. Prior to 2012 it was a part of the Mobile County Public School System.

The present Satsuma High School was first opened in 1958. The building that housed the first Satsuma High School in 1918 to 2000 has recently been remodeled to hold the history department, a few mathematics classes, and a gymnasium. The current building was built in 1983. Satsuma's 2019 Teacher of the Year is Mrs. Tiffany Miller (English, Peer Helpers, Mythology, and Azalea Trail). Its mascot is the Gators.

== Attendance zone ==
The school serves the City of Satsuma.

Prior to the 2012 split of the City of Satsuma from the Mobile County system, other areas of northern Mobile County, including Axis and Creola were zoned to Satsuma. Prior to the split of the City of Saraland from the county system in 2009, Saraland was zoned to Satsuma High.

After the separation of Satsuma city schools from Mobile County, areas formerly zoned to Satsuma High not in the Satsuma city limits, including Creola, were rezoned to Citronelle High School in Citronelle.

== Student body ==
In December 2011 Satsuma, still a county school, had 694 students. After Saraland left the Mobile County system, Satsuma's student enrollment dropped each year from 2008 to 2011. From 2010 to 2011 the enrollment declined by 21%. 2011 was the final year that the county allowed Saraland residents to attend county schools.

== Feeder patterns ==
Before the split of the City of Saraland, Satsuma received students from Adams Middle School.

== Notable alumni ==
- Randy McGilberry, former Major League Baseball pitcher for the Kansas City Royals
