= John Kimbrough (wide receiver) =

American football player (born 1954)

No. 82
- Position: Wide receiver

Personal information
- Born: August 12, 1954 (age 72); Mount Vernon, Alabama, U.S.
- Listed height: 5 ft 10 in (1.78 m)
- Listed weight: 165 lb (75 kg)

Career information
- High school: Citronelle (Citronelle, Alabama)
- College: St. Cloud State
- NFL draft: 1977: 3rd round, 73rd overall pick

Career history
- Buffalo Bills (1977–1978)

Career NFL statistics
- Receptions: 10
- Receiving yards: 207
- Receiving touchdowns: 2
- Return yards: 530
- Return touchdowns: 1
- Stats at Pro Football Reference

John R. Kimbrough (born August 12, 1954) is an American former professional football player who was a wide receiver in the National Football League (NFL).

== College career ==
Kimbrough was a member of the football and track and field teams at St. Cloud State. He was a three-time All-Northern Intercollegiate Conference selection in football and was named second-team Little All-America by the Associated Press. Kimbrough finished his collegiate career with 156 receptions for 2,878 yards and 28 touchdowns with 67 kickoffs returned for 1,583 yards and three touchdowns.

In track, Kimbrough won the Division II national title in the 100 meter dash as a junior in 1976.

== Professional career ==
Kimbrough was selected by the Buffalo Bills in the third round of the 1977 NFL draft. He played in all 14 of the Bills games as a rookie and was the team's primary kick and punt returner. Kimbrough finished the season with 10 receptions for 207 yards and two touchdowns, 16 punts returned for 184 yards and one touchdown and 15 kickoffs returned for 346 yards. Kimbrough was cut during training camp the next season.
