= Citronelle High School =

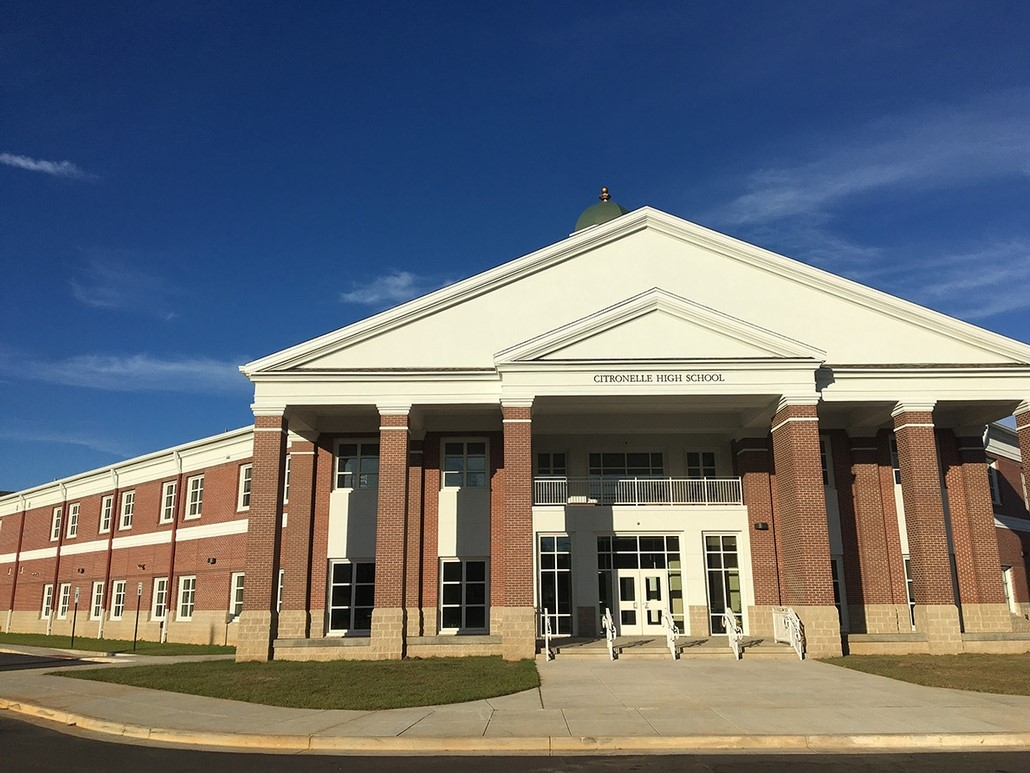

Location
- 8200 Lebaron Avenue; Citronelle, Alabama 36522; United States
- 31°05′36″N 88°14′09″W

Information
- School type: Public
- Motto: The Crimson and Gold Standard
- School district: Mobile County Public School System
- CEEB code: 010670
- Teaching staff: 43.00 (FTE)
- Grades: 9–12
- Enrollment: 734 (2024–2025)
- Student to teacher ratio: 17.07
- Colors: Crimson and Gold
- Team name: Wildcats
- Website: www.citronellewildcats.com

Citronelle High School is a senior high school in Citronelle, Alabama. It is a part of the Mobile County Public School System.

In serves: Citronelle, Axis, Bucks, Chunchula, Creola, Gulfcrest, Mount Vernon, and Movico, as well as the Mobile County portion of Calvert.

== History ==
After Satsuma formed its own school system, all areas in Mobile County formerly zoned to Satsuma High School that were not in the City of Satsuma were rezoned to Citronelle High. Due to the distance from Creola to Citronelle High-the distance by bus is about 30 minutes-several area parents wanted an annexation to the City of Satsuma and/or a partnership with the Satsuma school system. In 2013 a member of the Creola city council, Tonya Moss, stated that the city has "a bond with Satsuma" and that most of the council's members had graduated from Satsuma High.

Groundbreaking for the current campus occurred on Thursday January 22, 2015. White-Spunner Construction served as the general contractor. Its $22 million bid was approved by the Mobile County school board in December 2014.

The building had a price tag of $25 million. The school board initially wanted the high school to be built on the site of the existing campus, but tests found that the soil could not support a two-story campus, delaying the construction. The school board considered relocating the school across the street and buying a strip mall located there. The site across the street was ultimately chosen. It was scheduled to open in the summer of 2016.

== Notable alumni ==
- Jeff Kelly, former NFL quarterback for the Seattle Seahawks and current head coach for Saraland High School
- John Kimbrough, former NFL wide receiver for the Buffalo Bills
- Lance Taylor, current head football coach of Western Michigan University
- Fuego Del Sol, Professional Wrestling Entertainer and former member of AEW
