= Calvert, Alabama =

- Census-designated place
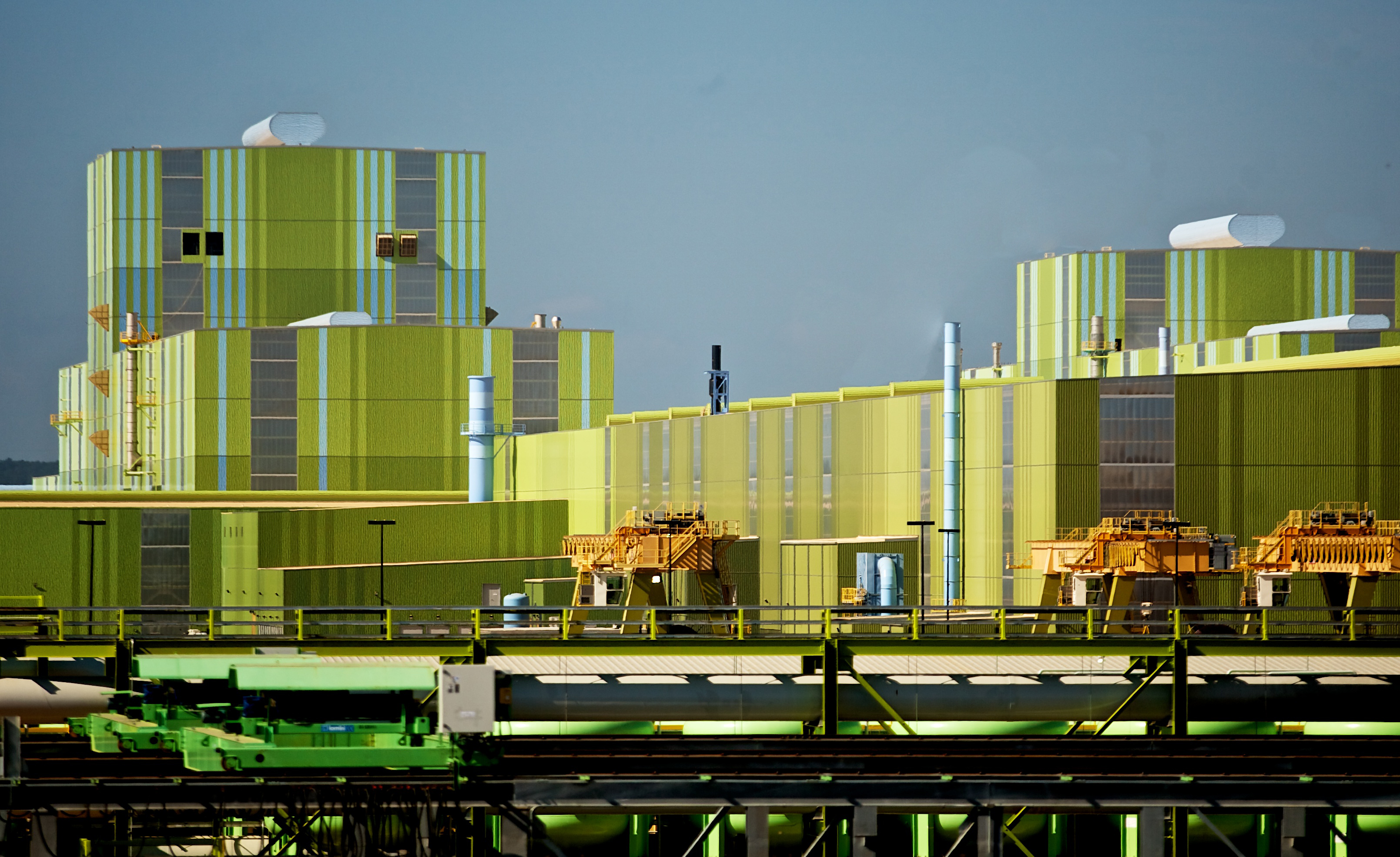
- AM/NS Calvert's hot dip galvanizing lines in Calvert

- Location in Mobile and Washington counties, Alabama
- Coordinates: 31°09′25″N 88°00′32″W
- Country: United States
- State: Alabama
- County: Mobile

Area
  - Total: 2.36 sq mi (6.10 km^{2})
  - Land: 2.34 sq mi (6.06 km^{2})
  - Water: 0.019 sq mi (0.05 km^{2})
- Elevation: 36 ft (11 m)

Population (2020)
  - Total: 255
  - Density: 109.1/sq mi (42.11/km^{2})
- Time zone: UTC-6 (Central (CST))
  - Summer (DST): UTC-5 (CDT)
- ZIP code: 36513
- Area code: 251
- FIPS code: 01-11488
- GNIS ID: 2628582

Calvert is an unincorporated community and census-designated place (CDP) in Mobile and Washington counties, Alabama, United States. It is located in the extreme northeast corner of Mobile County and southeast corner of Washington County near the Tombigbee River, along U.S. Route 43. As of the 2020 census, the population of Calvert was 255.

== Demographics ==
Historical population
Census	Pop.	Note	%±
2010	277		—
2020	255		−7.9%
U.S. Decennial Census; 2010 2020

Calvert was first listed as a census designated place in the 2010 U.S. census.

Calvert CDP, Alabama – Racial and ethnic composition Note: the US Census treats Hispanic/Latino as an ethnic category. This table excludes Latinos from the racial categories and assigns them to a separate category. Hispanics/Latinos may be of any race.
Race / Ethnicity (NH = Non-Hispanic)	Pop 2010	Pop 2020	% 2010	% 2020
White alone (NH)	146	156	52.71%	61.18%
Black or African American alone (NH)	98	62	35.38%	24.31%
Native American or Alaska Native alone (NH)	18	28	6.50%	10.98%
Asian alone (NH)	0	0	0.00%	0.00%
Native Hawaiian or Pacific Islander alone (NH)	0	0	0.00%	0.00%
Other race alone (NH)	2	0	0.72%	0.00%
Mixed race or Multiracial (NH)	7	7	2.53%	2.75%
Hispanic or Latino (any race)	6	2	2.17%	0.78%
Total	277	255	100.00%	100.00%

== Education ==
Residents of the Mobile County section are zoned to Mobile County Public School System campuses. Residents of that section are zoned to Citronelle High School. The Mobile County section of the community was formerly in the attendance boundary of the Belsaw/MT. Vernon K-8 school in Mount Vernon, which closed in 2016.

Residents of the Washington County section are served by Washington County School District.

== Industry ==
German technology conglomerate ThyssenKrupp broke ground on a US$4.65 billion stainless and carbon steel processing facility in Calvert in 2007. The facility became operational in July 2010. ThyssenKrupp's stainless steel division, Inoxum, including the stainless portion of the Calvert plant, was sold to Finnish stainless steel company Outokumpu in 2012. The remaining portion of the ThyssenKrupp plant, with a production capacity of 5.3 million metric tons that includes a hot strip mill, cold roll mill and four coating lines, was purchased by a 50/50 joint partnership of ArcelorMittal and Nippon Steel in February 2014 for $1.5 billion and renamed AM/NS Calvert. At the time, ThyssenKrupp was the region's 2nd largest industrial employer.
