= Mobile County, Alabama =

County in Alabama, United States

- County
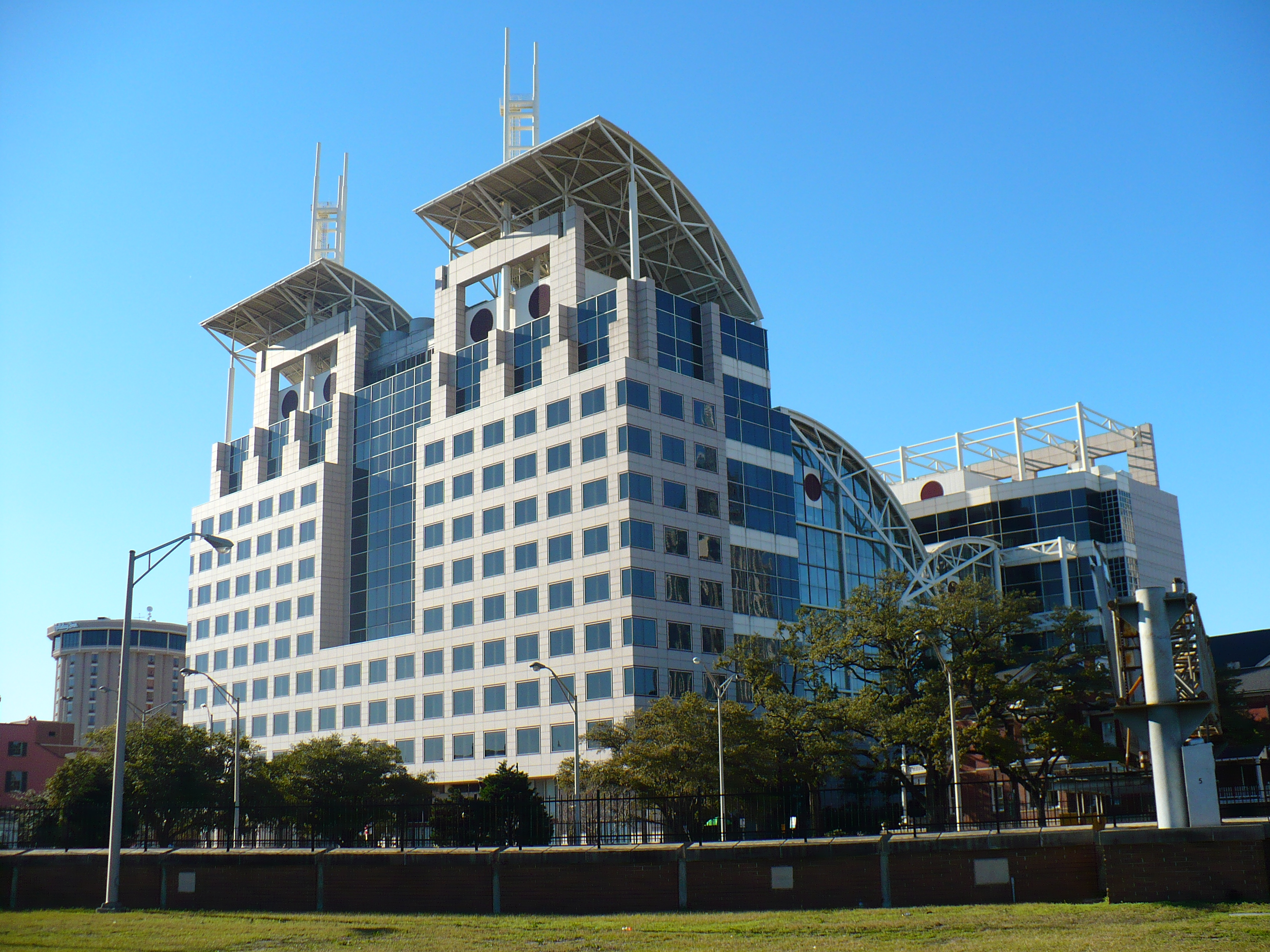
- Mobile Government Plaza in Mobile

- Flag Seal

- Location within the U.S. state of Alabama
- Interactive map of Mobile County, Alabama
- Coordinates: 30°47′11″N 88°12′50″W
- Country: United States
- State: Alabama
- Founded: December 18, 1812
- Named for: Mobile Bay
- Seat: Mobile
- Largest city: Mobile

Area
  - Total: 1,644 sq mi (4,260 km^{2})
  - Land: 1,229 sq mi (3,180 km^{2})
  - Water: 415 sq mi (1,070 km^{2}) 25.2%

Population (2020)
  - Total: 414,809
  - Estimate (2025): 411,658 ▼
  - Density: 337.5/sq mi (130.3/km^{2})
- Time zone: UTC−6 (Central)
  - Summer (DST): UTC−5 (CDT)
- Congressional districts: 1st, 2nd
- Website: mobilecountyal.gov
- County Number 02 on Alabama license plates; One of three counties shuffled to the top 3 numbers because of population size

Mobile County (/moʊˈbiːl/ moh-BEEL) is a county located in the southwestern corner of the U.S. state of Alabama. It is the third-most populous county in the state after Jefferson and Madison counties. As of the 2020 census, its population was 414,809. Its county seat and largest city is the state's second-largest city, Mobile, which was founded as a deepwater port on the Mobile River. The only such port in Alabama, it has long been integral to the economy for providing access to inland waterways as well as the Gulf of Mexico.

The city, river, and county were named in honor of Maubila, a village of the paramount chief Tuskaloosa of the regional Mississippian culture. In 1540 he arranged an ambush of soldiers of Hernando de Soto's expedition in an effort to expel them from the territory. The Spaniards were armed with guns and killed many of the tribe. Mobile County and Washington County, Alabama make up the Mobile Metropolitan Statistical Area with a 2020 population of 430,197. The Mobile, AL MSA and Daphne-Fairhope-Foley, AL MSA make up the much larger Mobile-Daphne-Fairhope CSA with a 2020 population of 661,964.

The MOWA Band of Choctaw Indians reside in the northern border area of the county. Their oral traditions narrate undocumented descent from Choctaw who avoided Indian Removal.

== History ==
This area was occupied for thousands of years by various indigenous peoples. At the time of Spanish expeditions in the early 16th century, its inhabitants were the creators of the Mississippian Bottle Creek material culture, which was south of the Pafalaya, centered at Moundville, and west of Apalachee Province. The Choctaw tribe emerged somewhat later from Pafalaya. In the 1700s, they lived along what French colonists called the Mobile River. The Choctaw tribe also founded the town of Mobile on the river and bay in the early 18th century.

The British took over the French claim to the territory in 1763 (along with other French territories east of the Mississippi River) after defeating the French in the Seven Years' War. During the American Revolutionary War, the claim passed to the Spanish as part of their colony called Spanish Florida. Spain ceded the territory to the United States after the War of 1812.

In the 1830s, the United States forced the removal of the Choctaw tribe, who owned the area. The order was issued under President Andrew Jackson's policy and an act of Congress to deport them to Indian Territory west of the Mississippi River to make way for European settlers.

After more than a century of European settlement, beginning with French colonists, Mobile County was organized by the state legislature and the proclamation of Governor Holmes of the Mississippi Territory on December 18, 1812. When Mississippi was separated and admitted as a state on December 10, 1817, after adopting its constitution on August 15, 1817, Mobile County became part of what was called the Alabama Territory. Two years later, the county became part of the state of Alabama, granted statehood on December 14, 1819.

The city of Mobile, first settled by French colonists in the early 18th century as part of La Louisiane, was designated as the county seat from the early days of the county. Both the county and city derive their name from Fort Louis de la Mobile, a French fortification established (near present-day Axis, Alabama) in 1702. The word "Mobile" is believed to stem from a Choctaw word for "paddlers". The area was occupied by French colonists from 1702 to 1763, and their influence has been strong in the city. It was ruled by the British from 1763 to 1780, when more American colonists began to enter the territory; and controlled by the Spanish from 1780 to 1813.

At the end of the War of 1812, the United States took over the territory. At that time, new settlers were being attracted to the land, eager to develop short-staple cotton in the uplands area. Invention of the cotton gin made processing of this type of cotton profitable, stimulating wholesale development of new cotton plantations in the Black Belt during the antebellum years. Mobile developed as a major deepwater port; in the nineteenth century, cotton was its major export.

There were nine documented lynchings in Mobile from 1891 to 1981.

- March 31, 1891 — Zachariah Graham
- October 2, 1906 — Roy Hoyle
- October 2, 1906 — Willie Thompson
- October 2, 1906 — Corneilius Robinson
- September 22, 1907 — Mose Dossett
- January 23, 1909 — Richard Robertson
- July 31, 1910 — Bill Walker
- June 6, 1919 — James E. Lewis
- March 21, 1981 — Michael Donald

Courthouse fires occurred in the years 1823, 1840, and 1872.

== Geography ==
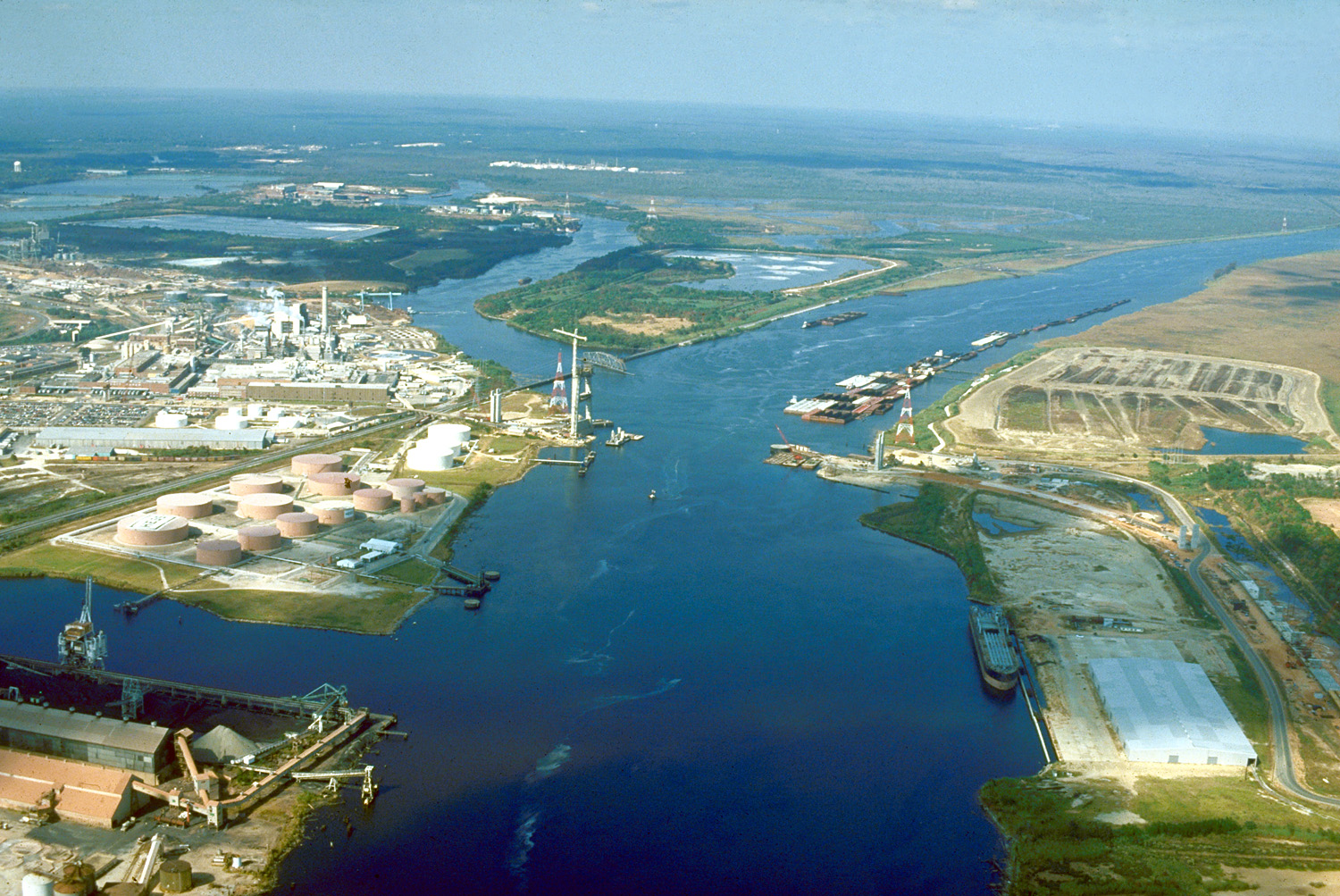
Aerial view of the Mobile River at its confluence with Chickasaw Creek. This photograph was taken around 1990, during construction of the Cochrane-Africatown bridge carrying U.S. Route 90 across the river.

According to the United States Census Bureau, the county has a total area of 1,644 square miles (4,260 km^{2}), of which 1,229 square miles (3,180 km^{2}) is land and 415 square miles (1,070 km^{2}) (25.2%) is water. It is the fourth-largest county in Alabama by land area and second-largest by total area. It includes several islands, including Dauphin Island, Gaillard Island and Mon Louis Island.

=== Major highways ===
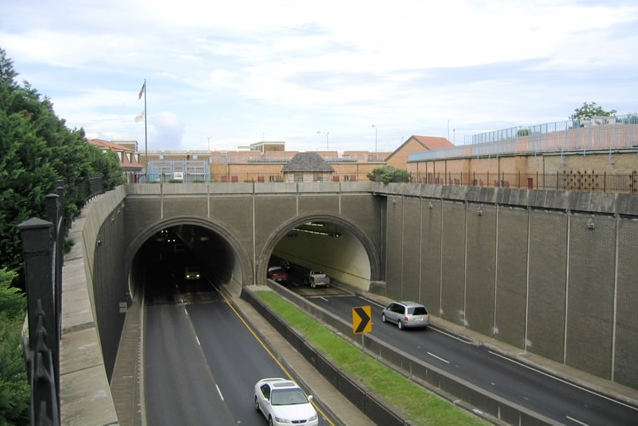
Interstate 10 entering the Wallace Tunnel in Mobile, Alabama.

- Interstate 10
- Interstate 65
- Interstate 165
- U.S. Highway 43 / State Route 13 (unsigned)
- U.S. Highway 45 / State Route 17 (unsigned)
- U.S. Highway 90 / State Route 16 (unsigned)
- U.S. Highway 98 / State Route 42 (unsigned)
- State Route 158
- State Route 163
- State Route 188
- State Route 193
- State Route 213
- State Route 217

=== Transit ===
- The Wave Transit System

=== Adjacent counties ===
- Washington County (north)
- Baldwin County (east)
- Jackson County, Mississippi (southwest)
- George County, Mississippi (west)
- Greene County, Mississippi (northwest)

=== National protected areas ===
- Bon Secour National Wildlife Refuge (part)
- Grand Bay National Wildlife Refuge (part)

== Demographics ==
Historical population
Census	Pop.	Note	%±
1820	2,672		—
1830	6,267		134.5%
1840	18,741		199.0%
1850	27,600		47.3%
1860	41,131		49.0%
1870	49,311		19.9%
1880	48,653		−1.3%
1890	51,587		6.0%
1900	62,740		21.6%
1910	80,854		28.9%
1920	100,117		23.8%
1930	118,363		18.2%
1940	141,974		19.9%
1950	231,105		62.8%
1960	314,301		36.0%
1970	317,308		1.0%
1980	364,980		15.0%
1990	378,643		3.7%
2000	399,843		5.6%
2010	412,992		3.3%
2020	414,809		0.4%
2025 (est.)	411,658	▼	−0.8%
U.S. Decennial Census; 1790–1960 1900–1990; 1990–2000 2010–2020

=== 2020 census ===
As of the 2020 census, there were 414,809 people, 163,750 households, and 107,701 families residing in the county. The median age was 38.6 years. 23.0% of residents were under the age of 18 and 17.1% of residents were 65 years of age or older. For every 100 females there were 91.1 males, and for every 100 females age 18 and over there were 88.1 males age 18 and over.

The racial makeup of the county was 55.3% White, 35.3% Black or African American, 1.0% American Indian and Alaska Native, 2.1% Asian, 0.1% Native Hawaiian and Pacific Islander, 1.4% from some other race, and 4.9% from two or more races. Hispanic or Latino residents of any race comprised 3.2% of the population.

77.6% of residents lived in urban areas, while 22.4% lived in rural areas.

There were 163,750 households in the county, of which 30.8% had children under the age of 18 living with them and 34.3% had a female householder with no spouse or partner present. About 29.0% of all households were made up of individuals and 11.6% had someone living alone who was 65 years of age or older.

There were 184,441 housing units, of which 11.2% were vacant. Among occupied housing units, 64.6% were owner-occupied and 35.4% were renter-occupied. The homeowner vacancy rate was 1.9% and the rental vacancy rate was 9.9%.

The county's largest city, Mobile (population 187,041 per the 2020 census) is majority minority with African-Americans making up 51.06% of its population.

=== Racial and ethnic composition ===
Mobile County, Alabama – Racial and ethnic composition Note: the US Census treats Hispanic/Latino as an ethnic category. This table excludes Latinos from the racial categories and assigns them to a separate category. Hispanics/Latinos may be of any race.
Race / Ethnicity (NH = Non-Hispanic)	Pop 2000	Pop 2010	Pop 2020	% 2000	% 2010	% 2020
White alone (NH)	249,763	243,904	226,703	62.47%	59.06%	54.65%
Black or African American alone (NH)	132,845	142,272	145,435	33.22%	34.45%	35.06%
Native American or Alaska Native alone (NH)	2,636	3,541	3,743	0.66%	0.86%	0.90%
Asian alone (NH)	5,599	7,507	8,515	1.40%	1.82%	2.05%
Pacific Islander alone (NH)	79	157	216	0.02%	0.04%	0.05%
Other race alone (NH)	319	428	1,302	0.08%	0.10%	0.31%
Mixed race or Multiracial (NH)	3,715	5,247	15,470	0.93%	1.27%	3.73%
Hispanic or Latino (any race)	4,887	9,936	13,425	1.22%	2.41%	3.24%
Total	399,843	412,992	414,809	100.00%	100.00%	100.00%

=== 2010 census ===
According to the 2010 census, the population of the county comprised the following racial and ethnic groups:

- 60.2% White
- 34.6% Black
- 0.9% Native American
- 1.8% Asian
- 0.0% Native Hawaiian or Pacific Islander
- 1.5% Two or more races
- 2.4% Hispanic or Latino (of any race)

=== 2000 census ===
As of the 2000 census, there were 399,843 people, 150,179 households, and 106,777 families residing in the county. The population density was 324 people per square mile (125 people/km^{2}). There were 165,101 housing units at an average density of 134 units per square mile (52 units/km^{2}). The racial makeup of the county was 63.07% White, 33.38% Black or African American, 0.67% Native American, 1.41% Asian, 0.03% Pacific Islander, 0.40% from other races, and 1.04% from two or more races. 1.22% of the population were Hispanic or Latino of any race.

There were 150,179 households, out of which 34.40% had children under the age of 18 living with them, 49.50% were married couples living together, 17.70% had a female householder with no husband present, and 28.90% were non-families. 24.80% of all households were made up of individuals, and 8.80% had someone living alone who was 65 years of age or older. The average household size was 2.61 and the average family size was 3.13.

In the county, the population dispersal was 27.50% under the age of 18, 10.00% from 18 to 24, 28.70% from 25 to 44, 21.90% from 45 to 64, and 12.00% who were 65 years of age or older. The median age was 34 years. For every 100 females, there were 91.50 males. For every 100 females age 18 and over, there were 87.10 males. The median income for a household in the county was $33,710, and the median income for a family was $40,378. Males had a median income of $32,329 versus $21,986 for females. The per capita income for the county was $17,178. About 15.60% of families and 18.50% of the population were below the poverty line, including 26.20% of those under age 18 and 14.60% of those age 65 or over.

== Government ==
=== Local ===
Mobile County Commission districts District 1 District 2 District 3

Mobile County has a limited form of home rule and is governed by a three-member county commission. Each commissioner represents a single-member district and is elected by the voters of that district to serve a four-year term. Each commissioner has an equal vote on the commission. During an elected term, each commissioner serves as President of the Mobile County Commission for 16 months, beginning with the District 1 Commissioner.

As of November 2024, Mobile County Commissioners are:

- District 1 (northern County) – Merceria L. Ludgood (D)
- District 2 (western and central County) – Connie Hudson (R)
- District 3 (southern County) – Randall Dueitt (R)

=== State ===
Under the state constitution, the legislature maintains considerable power over county affairs.

Mobile County is represented in the Alabama Legislature by four senators and nine representatives.

State Senators representing portions of Mobile County are:

- Republican Greg Albritton (22nd District),
- Democrat Vivian Davis Figures (33rd District),
- Republican Jack W. Williams (34th District), and
- Republican David Sessions (35th District).

State Representatives representing portions of Mobile County are:

- Democrat Adline Clarke (97th District),
- Democrat Napoleon Bracy (98th District),
- Democrat Sam Jones (99th District),
- Republican Mark Shirey (100th District),
- Republican Chris Pringle (101st District),
- Republican Shane Stringer (102nd District),
- Democrat Barbara Drummond (103rd District),
- Republican Margie Wilcox (104th District), and
- Republican Chip Brown (105th District).

== Education ==
In most areas of Mobile County, schools are operated by the Mobile County Public School System. The cities of Chickasaw, Saraland, and Satsuma have separate school systems; served by Chickasaw City Schools, Saraland Board of Education, and Satsuma City School System, respectively.

Mobile County is the home of the University of South Alabama (USA), a public research university divided into ten colleges, including one of Alabama's two state-supported medical schools. USA has an enrollment of over 16,000 students and employs more than 6,000 faculty, administrators, and support staff. It is also home to two private institutions of higher learning. Spring Hill College, founded in 1830, is Catholic and the third-oldest Jesuit college or university in the U.S. Its enrollment is about 1,500 students and it offers 46 academic majors. The University of Mobile, established in 1961 and affiliated with the Alabama Baptist Convention (the state convention of the Southern Baptist Convention), has an enrollment of about 2,000 and offers 90 academic majors.

== Politics ==
Mobile County is very conservative for an urban county. The last Democrat to win the county was John F. Kennedy in 1960 and is one of only 7 counties in Alabama to back Gerald Ford over Jimmy Carter in 1976. Within the city of Mobile, the margins between the Republican and Democrat candidates are usually between 10 and 19 points. Since 1996, the Democrats have gotten 40-45% of the vote.

United States presidential election results for Mobile County, Alabama
Year	Republican		Democratic		Third party(ies)	
Year	No.	%	No.	%	No.	%
1824	155	38.08%	205	50.37%	47	11.55%
1828	178	31.01%	396	68.99%	0	0.00%
1832	0	0.00%	331	100.00%	0	0.00%
1836	739	46.04%	866	53.96%	0	0.00%
1840	1,481	56.92%	1,121	43.08%	0	0.00%
1844	1,403	51.02%	1,347	48.98%	0	0.00%
1848	1,319	55.14%	1,073	44.86%	0	0.00%
1852	1,123	43.24%	1,380	53.14%	94	3.62%
1856	0	0.00%	1,838	50.93%	1,771	49.07%
1860	0	0.00%	1,823	36.51%	3,170	63.49%
1868	5,200	43.85%	6,658	56.15%	0	0.00%
1872	5,946	47.69%	6,522	52.31%	0	0.00%
1876	4,272	44.49%	5,330	55.51%	0	0.00%
1880	3,239	44.84%	3,784	52.38%	201	2.78%
1884	2,787	49.69%	2,806	50.03%	16	0.29%
1888	2,542	44.98%	3,109	55.02%	0	0.00%
1892	397	5.63%	4,680	66.33%	1,979	28.05%
1896	2,778	37.76%	3,948	53.66%	631	8.58%
1900	2,243	41.64%	2,939	54.56%	205	3.81%
1904	325	8.84%	3,283	89.33%	67	1.82%
1908	453	14.03%	2,422	75.03%	353	10.94%
1912	140	3.72%	3,009	79.98%	613	16.29%
1916	832	21.36%	2,968	76.18%	96	2.46%
1920	2,681	29.71%	6,171	68.39%	171	1.90%
1924	1,814	28.54%	4,125	64.91%	416	6.55%
1928	5,058	45.84%	5,965	54.07%	10	0.09%
1932	1,705	14.90%	9,658	84.42%	78	0.68%
1936	1,072	8.64%	11,165	89.95%	175	1.41%
1940	1,887	13.99%	11,480	85.08%	126	0.93%
1944	2,867	23.08%	9,439	75.98%	117	0.94%
1948	2,685	19.41%	0	0.00%	11,150	80.59%
1952	14,153	49.29%	14,473	50.40%	89	0.31%
1956	20,639	52.21%	17,163	43.41%	1,732	4.38%
1960	24,608	45.12%	28,626	52.48%	1,308	2.40%
1964	49,493	70.72%	0	0.00%	20,488	29.28%
1968	10,509	11.43%	18,615	20.25%	62,812	68.32%
1972	62,639	73.15%	20,694	24.17%	2,301	2.69%
1976	53,835	50.85%	50,264	47.47%	1,777	1.68%
1980	67,515	57.71%	46,180	39.47%	3,297	2.82%
1984	81,923	62.56%	47,252	36.08%	1,784	1.36%
1988	72,203	60.88%	45,524	38.39%	870	0.73%
1992	72,935	50.72%	54,962	38.22%	15,891	11.05%
1996	66,775	51.32%	54,749	42.08%	8,579	6.59%
2000	78,162	55.93%	58,640	41.96%	2,943	2.11%
2004	92,014	58.69%	63,732	40.65%	1,025	0.65%
2008	98,049	54.04%	82,181	45.30%	1,194	0.66%
2012	94,893	54.18%	78,760	44.97%	1,487	0.85%
2016	95,116	55.06%	72,186	41.79%	5,435	3.15%
2020	101,243	55.27%	79,474	43.39%	2,447	1.34%
2024	100,759	57.52%	72,055	41.14%	2,350	1.34%

United States Senate election results for Mobile County, Alabama2
Year	Republican		Democratic		Third party(ies)	
Year	No.	%	No.	%	No.	%
2020	96,320	52.73%	86,034	47.10%	315	0.17%

United States Senate election results for Mobile County, Alabama3
Year	Republican		Democratic		Third party(ies)	
Year	No.	%	No.	%	No.	%
2022	64,378	60.11%	40,266	37.60%	2,456	2.29%

Alabama Gubernatorial election results for Mobile County
Year	Republican		Democratic		Third party(ies)	
Year	No.	%	No.	%	No.	%
2022	63,593	59.36%	38,910	36.32%	4,632	4.32%

== Communities ==
=== Cities ===
- Bayou La Batre
- Chickasaw
- Citronelle
- Creola
- Mobile (county seat)
- Prichard
- Saraland
- Satsuma
- Semmes

=== Towns ===
- Dauphin Island
- Mount Vernon

=== Census-designated places ===
- Axis
- Belle Fontaine
- Bucks
- Calvert (partly in Washington County)
- Chunchula
- Grand Bay
- Gulfcrest
- Movico
- Theodore
- Tillmans Corner

=== Unincorporated communities ===
- Alabama Port
- Coden
- Crawford
- Eight Mile
- Fernland
- Irvington
- Kushla
- Le Moyne
- Mauvilla
- Mon Louis
- St. Elmo
- Tanner Williams
- Whistler
- Wilmer

=== Ghost town ===
- Beaver Mills

== See also ==
- National Register of Historic Places listings in Mobile, Alabama
- National Register of Historic Places listings in Mobile County, Alabama
- Properties on the Alabama Register of Landmarks and Heritage in Mobile County, Alabama

== Bibliography ==
- Summary under the Criteria and Evidence for Proposed Finding against Federal Acknowledgment of the MOWA Band of Choctaw (PDF) (Report). Washington, D.C.: United States Department of the Interior. December 15, 1994.
- Miller, Mark Edwin (2013). Claiming Tribal Identity: The Five Tribes and the Politics of Federal Acknowledgment. Norman: University of Oklahoma Press. ISBN 978-0806143781.
- Hudson, Angela Pulley (2021). "Removals and Remainders: Apaches and Choctaws in the Jim Crow South". The Journal of the Civil War Era. 11 (1). The University of North Carolina Press: 80–102. doi:10.1353/cwe.2021.0005 – via Project Muse.
