= Satsuma, Alabama =

City in Alabama, United States

- City
- Motto: "Enjoy Quality of Life in Satsuma"
- Location in Mobile County, Alabama
- Coordinates: 30°51′56″N 88°04′26″W
- Country: United States
- State: Alabama
- County: Mobile

Area
  - Total: 7.40 sq mi (19.16 km^{2})
  - Land: 7.35 sq mi (19.03 km^{2})
  - Water: 0.050 sq mi (0.13 km^{2})
- Elevation: 23 ft (7.0 m)

Population (2020)
  - Total: 6,749
  - Density: 918.5/sq mi (354.62/km^{2})
- Time zone: UTC-6 (Central (CST))
  - Summer (DST): UTC-5 (CDT)
- ZIP code: 36572
- Area code: 251
- FIPS code: 01-68352
- GNIS feature ID: 2405427
- Website: www.cityofsatsuma.com

Satsuma is a city in Mobile County, Alabama, United States. At the 2020 census, the population was 6,749, up from 6,168 at the 2010 census. Known prior to 1915 as "Fig Tree Island", the city was named after the satsuma orange, which was successfully cultivated and grown in Alabama starting in 1878, a gift from Emperor Meiji of Japan. Satsuma is a part of the Mobile metropolitan area.

== History ==
The area was inhabited for thousands of years by differing cultures of indigenous peoples.

- 1878 – Farmers introduced Mandarin Satsuma oranges to Alabama from Japan for cultivation.
- 1900 – Satsuma area known as Fig Tree Island
- 1910 – Pace Orange Orchard had about 100 acres (0.40 km^{2}) of pecans and satsuma trees on the area.
- 1912-1924 – Satsuma trees damaged by cold weather and citrus canker
- 1915 – Town named "Satsuma"
- 1918 – Norman E. McConaghy hired as manager of the Satsuma Orange & Pecan Groves Company
- 1922 – Packing house built; still stands above Mac's Landing
- 1959 – Plans for a town charter submitted to the County of Mobile and the State of Alabama were approved. April 6, 1959, was the first municipal election.
- 2011 – Satsuma breaks away from the Mobile County school system and starts working on its own curriculum.

== Geography ==
Satsuma is in northeastern Mobile County; it is bordered to the southwest by Saraland, to the northeast by Creola, and to the southeast by an undeveloped extension of the city of Mobile. U.S. Route 43 and Interstate 65 are the main highways through Satsuma, intersecting at the northern edge of the city. Downtown Mobile is 13 miles (21 km) to the south.

According to the U.S. Census Bureau, Satsuma has a total area of 7.4 square miles (19 km^{2}), of which 0.05 square miles (0.13 km^{2}), or 0.68%, are water. The city is bordered to the east by Gunnison Creek, a tidal tributary of Bayou Sara, which leads to the Mobile River.

== Demographics ==
Historical population
Census	Pop.	Note	%±
1960	1,491		—
1970	2,035		36.5%
1980	3,822		87.8%
1990	5,194		35.9%
2000	5,687		9.5%
2010	6,168		8.5%
2020	6,749		9.4%
2025 (est.)	6,851	▲	1.5%
U.S. Decennial Census

=== 2020 census ===
As of the 2020 census, Satsuma had a population of 6,749. The median age was 42.2 years. 22.4% of residents were under the age of 18 and 19.9% of residents were 65 years of age or older. For every 100 females there were 93.4 males, and for every 100 females age 18 and over there were 92.0 males age 18 and over.

96.1% of residents lived in urban areas, while 3.9% lived in rural areas.

There were 2,545 households in Satsuma, including 1,705 families. Of all households, 59.7% were married-couple households, 14.1% were households with a male householder and no spouse or partner present, and 22.2% were households with a female householder and no spouse or partner present. About 20.9% of all households were made up of individuals, and 11.2% had someone living alone who was 65 years of age or older. 34.7% had children under the age of 18 living in them.

There were 2,683 housing units, of which 5.1% were vacant. The homeowner vacancy rate was 1.4% and the rental vacancy rate was 5.6%.

Satsuma racial composition
Race	Num.	Perc.
White (non-Hispanic)	5,733	84.95%
Black or African American (non-Hispanic)	525	7.78%
Native American	88	1.3%
Asian	29	0.43%
Pacific Islander	3	0.04%
Other/Mixed	286	4.24%
Hispanic or Latino	85	1.26%

=== 2010 census ===
At the 2010 census there were 6,168 people in 2,290 households, including 1,774 families, in the city. The population density was 948.9 inhabitants per square mile (366.4/km^{2}). There were 2,416 housing units at an average density of 371.7 per square mile (143.5/km^{2}). The racial makeup of the city was 88.7% White, 7.9% Black or African American, 1.2% Native American, 0.6% Asian, 0.4% from other races, and 1.1% from two or more races. 1.1% of the population were Hispanic or Latino of any race.

Of the 2,290 households 31.0% had children under the age of 18 living with them, 61.8% were married couples living together, 11.5% had a female householder with no husband present, and 22.5% were non-families. 18.8% of households were one person and 8.7% were one person aged 65 or older. The average household size was 2.67 and the average family size was 3.05.

The age distribution was 23.8% under the age of 18, 7.5% from 18 to 24, 24.4% from 25 to 44, 29.4% from 45 to 64, and 14.9% 65 or older. The median age was 40.7 years. For every 100 females, there were 93.2 males. For every 100 females age 18 and over, there were 94.8 males.

The median household income was $59,289 and the median family income was $63,333. Males had a median income of $46,938 versus $33,791 for females. The per capita income for the city was $25,087. About 0% of families and 0.7% of the population were below the poverty line, including 0% of those under age 18 and 1.5% of those age 65 or over.

=== 2000 census ===
At the 2000 census there were 5,687 people in 2,017 households, including 1,688 families, in the city. The population density was 873.1 inhabitants per square mile (337.1/km^{2}). There were 2,107 housing units at an average density of 323.5 per square mile (124.9/km^{2}). The racial makeup of the city was 93.72% White, 5.05% Black or African American, 0.55% Native American, 0.25% Asian, 0.16% from other races, and 0.28% from two or more races. 0.58% of the population were Hispanic or Latino of any race.

Of the 2,017 households 37.5% had children under the age of 18 living with them, 71.3% were married couples living together, 8.9% had a female householder with no husband present, and 16.3% were non-families. 14.8% of households were one person and 6.8% were one person aged 65 or older. The average household size was 2.81 and the average family size was 3.10.

The age distribution was 26.0% under the age of 18, 8.3% from 18 to 24, 28.0% from 25 to 44, 26.5% from 45 to 64, and 11.2% 65 or older. The median age was 38 years. For every 100 females, there were 96.2 males. For every 100 females age 18 and over, there were 91.3 males.

The median household income was $50,496 and the median family income was $53,180. Males had a median income of $39,123 versus $24,851 for females. The per capita income for the city was $23,972. About 4.7% of families and 6.0% of the population were below the poverty line, including 8.0% of those under age 18 and 10.9% of those age 65 or over.

== Education ==
Satsuma is served by the Satsuma City School System, following the successful separation from the Mobile County Public School System in 2012.

Satsuma voted on April 12, 2011, to create its own school system. The Satsuma City School System is served by two schools, Robert E. Lee Elementary (K-6) and Satsuma High School (7–12).

=== Before separation from Mobile ===
Before the Satsuma City School System was founded, the schools that served Satsuma included Robert E. Lee Primary School (Kindergarten through 2), Robert E. Lee Intermediate School (3 through 5), North Mobile County Middle School (6–8), Satsuma High School (9–12). Lee Primary, Lee Intermediate, and Satsuma High were in the city of Satsuma, while North Mobile County Middle was in Axis.

Before the Saraland City Schools system formed, Satsuma residents attended Adams Middle School in Saraland. In 2003, officials of Satsuma, Saraland, and Chickasaw contemplated forming the "Delta School District." Such a split would have required an act from the Alabama Legislature. In June 2006, the City of Saraland voted to break away from the Mobile County Public School System and form its own school system. On September 7, 2010, North Mobile County Middle School opened, replacing the role of Adams Middle School in Saraland, because residents outside of Saraland are no longer zoned to Adams Middle.

Satsuma residents considered leaving Mobile County schools since circa 2001. In 2010, the City of Satsuma began conducting a study on whether it can split from the Mobile County school system. Tom Williams, a council member of Satsuma, said he began considering splitting once Mobile County decided to situate the new middle school in Axis, 12 miles (19 km) from Satsuma, since students have longer bus rides to the school and that the school is further away from fire and police stations. The Mobile County government built the school outside of the Satsuma city limits so the city government would be unable to possess the school if it opted to secede.
