= China Doll (brand) =

American rice and beans brand

China Doll is a brand of rice and beans bagged and shipped by Marshall Biscuit Company, based in Saraland, Alabama (facilities based formerly in Mobile, Alabama). It is a local favorite among residents of Alabama, Mississippi, Georgia and Northern Florida. It specializes in non-flavored rice and beans and was founded by N.W. Hutchings in Mobile in 1938 and stayed in his family for more than 30 years but was eventually acquired by Riviana Foods. In November 2005, Riviana (having been acquired by Spain's leading food processor, Ebro Puleva) sold the China Doll division to Marshall Biscuit Co.
