= Axis, Alabama =

Unincorporated community in Alabama, United States

- Unincorporated community Census-designated place
- Location in Mobile County, Alabama
- Coordinates: 30°55′51″N 88°01′05″W
- Country: United States
- State: Alabama
- County: Mobile

Area
  - Total: 3.51 sq mi (9.08 km^{2})
  - Land: 3.49 sq mi (9.05 km^{2})
  - Water: 0.012 sq mi (0.03 km^{2})
- Elevation: 26 ft (7.9 m)

Population (2020)
  - Total: 561
  - Density: 160.5/sq mi (61.98/km^{2})
- Time zone: UTC-6 (Central (CST))
  - Summer (DST): UTC-5 (CDT)
- ZIP code: 36505
- Area code: 251
- FIPS code: 01-03508
- GNIS feature ID: 2628577

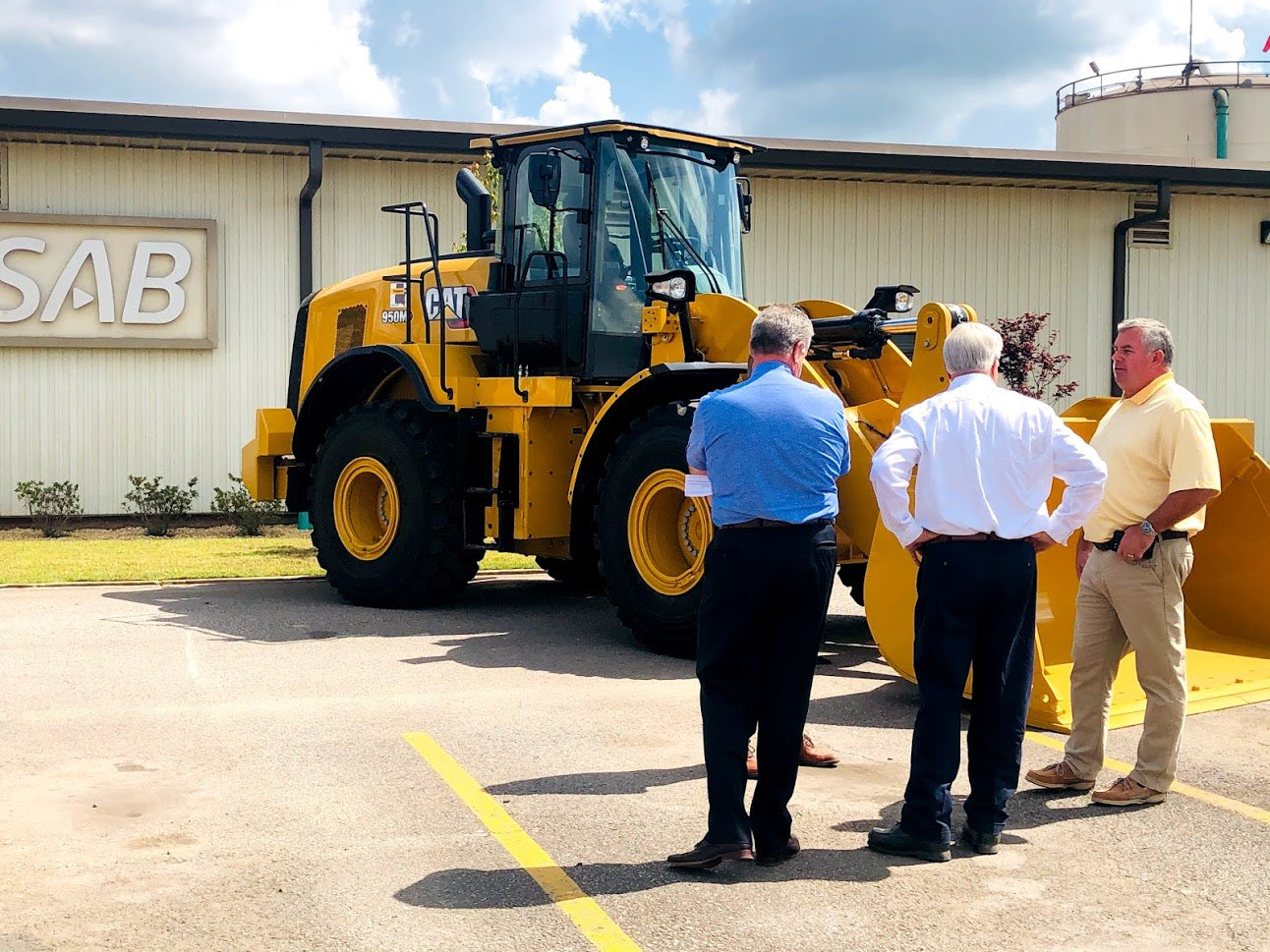
Congressman Jerry Carl visiting SSAB in Axis

Axis is an unincorporated community and census-designated place (CDP) in Mobile County, Alabama, United States. As of the 2020 census, it had a population of 561, down from 757 at the 2010 census. It has a post office with the 36505 ZIP code. The community has one site listed on the Alabama Register of Landmarks and Heritage, the Kirk House.

== Geography ==
Axis is located in northeastern Mobile County. It is bordered to the south by the city of Creola. U.S. Route 43 runs through the west side of the community, leading south 17 miles (27 km) to downtown Mobile and north 11 miles (18 km) to Mount Vernon.

According to the U.S. Census Bureau, the Axis CDP has an area of 3.5 square miles (9.1 km^{2}), of which 0.01 square miles (0.026 km^{2}), or 0.29%, are water.

== Education ==
Mobile County Public School System operates public schools. Students are zoned to North Mobile County K-8 School, previously North Mobile County Middle School; and Citronelle High School in Citronelle.

On September 7, 2010, North Mobile County Middle School opened, replacing the role of Adams Middle School in Saraland, because residents outside of Saraland are no longer zoned to Adams Middle. North Mobile County middle had been built on a "16th section", a piece of land allotted to each school district under an Alabama law stating that for each sixteen portions of land in a county, the school district will take one portion of land. Some City of Satsuma residents disliked North Mobile County Middle's distance and remoteness from Satsuma, prompting them to call for a separate school district. The Mobile County government built the school outside of the Satsuma city limits so the city government would be unable to possess the school if it opted to secede.

Prior to the split of Satsuma from the Mobile County system, Axis was zoned to Satsuma High School. In 2011 Renee Busbee of the Mobile Press-Register said that residents of Axis may be rezoned to Blount, Citronelle, and/or Vigor high schools.

== Viscose plant ==
Carbon disulfide emissions of Courtaulds' Axis viscose plant
Year	Emissions
1952	Plant began operations around this time
1986	30,000,000 pounds
1991	42,454,520 pounds into the air, 43,105 pounds into surface water, and 430,000 pounds into the land
1992	45,000,000 pounds into the air
1994	45,500,000 pounds
1997	just under 40,000,000 pounds

Courtaulds manufactured viscose rayon in a plant near Axis from about 1952. The plant emitted carbon disulfide (CS_{2}). In 1991, the EPA found the carbon disulfide emissions of the Axis plant to be more than double the total discharge of Alabama's nine other carbon-disulfide-emitting plants put together. The 1990 amendments to the United States' Clean Air Act required emissions reductions. In 1992, the plant recovered less than 10% of the carbon disulfide it used. In 1993–1997, the plant was upgraded in a manner that increased the reuse efficiency of carbon disulfide to 50-55%. The carbon-bed technology which had been used in the parent company's European operations for 30 years would have reduced emissions by 90%, but would not have improved revenue by decreasing carbon disulfide demand, so improved spinning machines were bought instead. No other efforts were made to reduce emissions. Courtaulds did not monitor carbon disulfide concentrations in its stacks or in air around the factory.

== Demographics ==
Historical population
Census	Pop.	Note	%±
2010	757		—
2020	561		−25.9%
U.S. Decennial Census

Axis was listed as a census designated place in the 2010 U.S. census.

Axis CDP, Alabama – Racial and ethnic composition Note: the US Census treats Hispanic/Latino as an ethnic category. This table excludes Latinos from the racial categories and assigns them to a separate category. Hispanics/Latinos may be of any race.
Race / Ethnicity (NH = Non-Hispanic)	Pop 2010	Pop 2020	% 2010	% 2020
White alone (NH)	500	327	66.05%	58.29%
Black or African American alone (NH)	204	190	26.95%	33.87%
Native American or Alaska Native alone (NH)	24	24	3.17%	4.28%
Asian alone (NH)	1	1	0.13%	0.18%
Native Hawaiian or Pacific Islander alone (NH)	1	0	0.13%	0.00%
Other race alone (NH)	0	2	0.00%	0.36%
Mixed race or Multiracial (NH)	20	13	2.64%	2.32%
Hispanic or Latino (any race)	7	4	0.92%	0.71%
Total	757	561	100.00%	100.00%

=== 2010 census ===
As of the 2010 census, Axis had a population of 757. The racial and ethnic makeup of the population was 66.8% white, 26.9% black or African American, 3.2% Native American, 0.1% Asian, 0.1% Pacific Islander, 0.1% from some other race, 2.6% from two or more races and 0.9% Hispanic or Latino from any race.
