= Mount Vernon, Alabama =

- Town
- Shotgun houses at Mount Vernon

- Location in Mobile County, Alabama
- Coordinates: 31°5′35″N 88°0′40″W
- Country: United States
- State: Alabama
- County: Mobile

Area
  - Total: 5.59 sq mi (14.49 km^{2})
  - Land: 5.48 sq mi (14.20 km^{2})
  - Water: 0.11 sq mi (0.29 km^{2})
- Elevation: 52 ft (16 m)

Population (2020)
  - Total: 1,354
  - Density: 247.0/sq mi (95.38/km^{2})
- Time zone: UTC-6 (Central (CST))
  - Summer (DST): UTC-5 (CDT)
- ZIP code: 36560
- Area code: 251
- FIPS code: 01-52608
- GNIS feature ID: 2406213
- Website: mtvernonal.com/WP/

Mount Vernon is a town in Mobile County, Alabama, United States. It is part of the Mobile metropolitan area. It incorporated in 1959. At the 2020 census the population was 1,354.

== Geography ==
Mount Vernon is located in the northeast corner of Mobile County and U.S. Route 43 passes through the town to the west of its center. US 43 leads south 30 miles (48 km) to Mobile and north 36 miles (58 km) to Jackson.

According to the U.S. Census Bureau, the town has a total area of 5.6 square miles (15 km^{2}), of which 0.1 square miles (0.26 km^{2}), or 2.02%, are water. Cedar Creek, an east-flowing tributary of the Mobile River, passes through the southernmost part of the town. The Mobile River itself is 2 miles (3 km) to the east, with access from State Landing Road off Old Military Road.

== Demographics ==
Historical population
Census	Pop.	Note	%±
1960	553		—
1970	1,079		95.1%
1980	1,038		−3.8%
1990	902		−13.1%
2000	844		−6.4%
2010	1,574		86.5%
2020	1,354		−14.0%
U.S. Decennial Census; 2013 Estimate

=== Racial and ethnic composition ===
Mount Vernon town, Alabama – Racial and ethnic composition Note: the US Census treats Hispanic/Latino as an ethnic category. This table excludes Latinos from the racial categories and assigns them to a separate category. Hispanics/Latinos may be of any race.
Race / Ethnicity (NH = Non-Hispanic)	Pop 2000	Pop 2010	Pop 2020	% 2000	% 2010	% 2020
White alone (NH)	383	362	286	45.38%	23.00%	21.12%
Black or African American alone (NH)	447	1,155	1,004	52.96%	73.38%	74.15%
Native American or Alaska Native alone (NH)	8	27	21	0.95%	1.72%	1.55%
Asian alone (NH)	0	1	0	0.00%	0.06%	0.00%
Native Hawaiian or Pacific Islander alone (NH)	0	0	1	0.00%	0.00%	0.07%
Other race alone (NH)	2	1	2	0.24%	0.06%	0.15%
Mixed race or Multiracial (NH)	3	17	31	0.36%	1.08%	2.29%
Hispanic or Latino (any race)	1	11	9	0.12%	0.70%	0.66%
Total	844	1,574	1,354	100.00%	100.00%	100.00%

=== 2020 census ===
As of the 2020 census, Mount Vernon had a population of 1,354. The median age was 44.8 years. 22.1% of residents were under the age of 18 and 21.3% of residents were 65 years of age or older. For every 100 females there were 92.3 males, and for every 100 females age 18 and over there were 87.1 males age 18 and over.

0.0% of residents lived in urban areas, while 100.0% lived in rural areas.

There were 540 households in Mount Vernon, including 336 families, and 32.2% of households had children under the age of 18 living in them. Of all households, 33.9% were married-couple households, 21.7% were households with a male householder and no spouse or partner present, and 40.7% were households with a female householder and no spouse or partner present. About 31.7% of all households were made up of individuals and 15.0% had someone living alone who was 65 years of age or older.

There were 634 housing units, of which 14.8% were vacant. The homeowner vacancy rate was 0.7% and the rental vacancy rate was 5.5%.

=== 2010 census ===
At the 2010 census there were 1,574 people, 556 households, and 399 families in the town. The population density was 828.4 inhabitants per square mile (319.8/km^{2}). There were 667 housing units at an average density of 351.1 per square mile (135.6/km^{2}). The racial makeup of the town was 73.6% Black or African American, 23.4% White, 1.7% Native American, 0.1% from other races, and 1.1% from two or more races. 0.7% of the population were Hispanic or Latino of any race. Of the 556 households 26.4% had children under the age of 18 living with them, 45.5% were married couples living together, 21.8% had a female householder with no husband present, and 28.2% were non-families. 25.4% of households were one person and 10.2% were one person aged 65 or older. The average household size was 2.72 and the average family size was 3.31.

The age distribution was 23.9% under the age of 18, 8.9% from 18 to 24, 19.9% from 25 to 44, 32.3% from 45 to 64, and 14.9% 65 or older. The median age was 42.3 years. For every 100 females, there were 97.7 males. For every 100 females age 18 and over, there were 101.9 males.

The median household income was $34,722 and the median family income was $46,111. Males had a median income of $41,250 versus $23,625 for females. The per capita income for the town was $13,790. About 2.7% of families and 26.5% of the population were below the poverty line, including 1.7% of those under age 18 and 18.9% of those age 65 or over.

=== 2000 census ===
At the 2000 census there were 844 people, 333 households, and 228 families in the town. The population density was 446.4 inhabitants per square mile (172.4/km^{2}). There were 395 housing units at an average density of 208.9 per square mile (80.7/km^{2}). The racial makeup of the town was 45.38% White, 52.96% Black or African American, 0.95% Native American, 0.24% from other races, and 0.47% from two or more races. 0.12% of the population were Hispanic or Latino of any race. Of the 333 households 28.8% had children under the age of 18 living with them, 50.8% were married couples living together, 14.4% had a female householder with no husband present, and 31.5% were non-families. 30.0% of households were one person and 16.2% were one person aged 65 or older. The average household size was 2.53 and the average family size was 3.19.

The age distribution was 26.2% under the age of 18, 8.6% from 18 to 24, 26.1% from 25 to 44, 22.4% from 45 to 64, and 16.7% 65 or older. The median age was 38 years. For every 100 females, there were 87.1 males. For every 100 females age 18 and over, there were 81.1 males.

The median household income was $29,861 and the median family income was $36,786. Males had a median income of $30,347 versus $18,750 for females. The per capita income for the town was $12,551. About 19.8% of families and 22.8% of the population were below the poverty line, including 32.9% of those under age 18 and 21.1% of those age 65 or over.

== Education ==
The city is served by the Mobile County Public School System. Elementary and middle schoolers go to North Mobile County K-8 near Axis CDP. High schoolers go on to Citronelle High School in Citronelle.

The city's sole public school was the E.T.Belsaw/Mt. Vernon School, which covered grades Kindergarten through 8. In 2006 it had 321 students. From 2010 to 2016 several extracurricular programs at the school were discontinued. It had 98 students in 2016. Gwendolyn Pugh, Mount Vernon Town Councilor, stated that the enrollment drop was due to the extracurricular programs being removed. The county board voted to close the school in 2016.

== Historic areas in and around Mt. Vernon ==
Mount Vernon was home to a historic psychiatric hospital, Searcy Hospital, formerly the site of the Mount Vernon Arsenal. The hospital closed in 2012.

A land marker used for surveying land known as "Ellicott's Stone" lies 6 miles (10 km) south of the town to the east of US 43.

== Notable people ==
- John Kimbrough, former National Football League wide receiver
- William Trent Rossell, Chief of Engineers of the US Army Corps of Engineers in 1913

== Gallery ==
Photographs taken in Mount Vernon as part of the Historic American Buildings Survey:

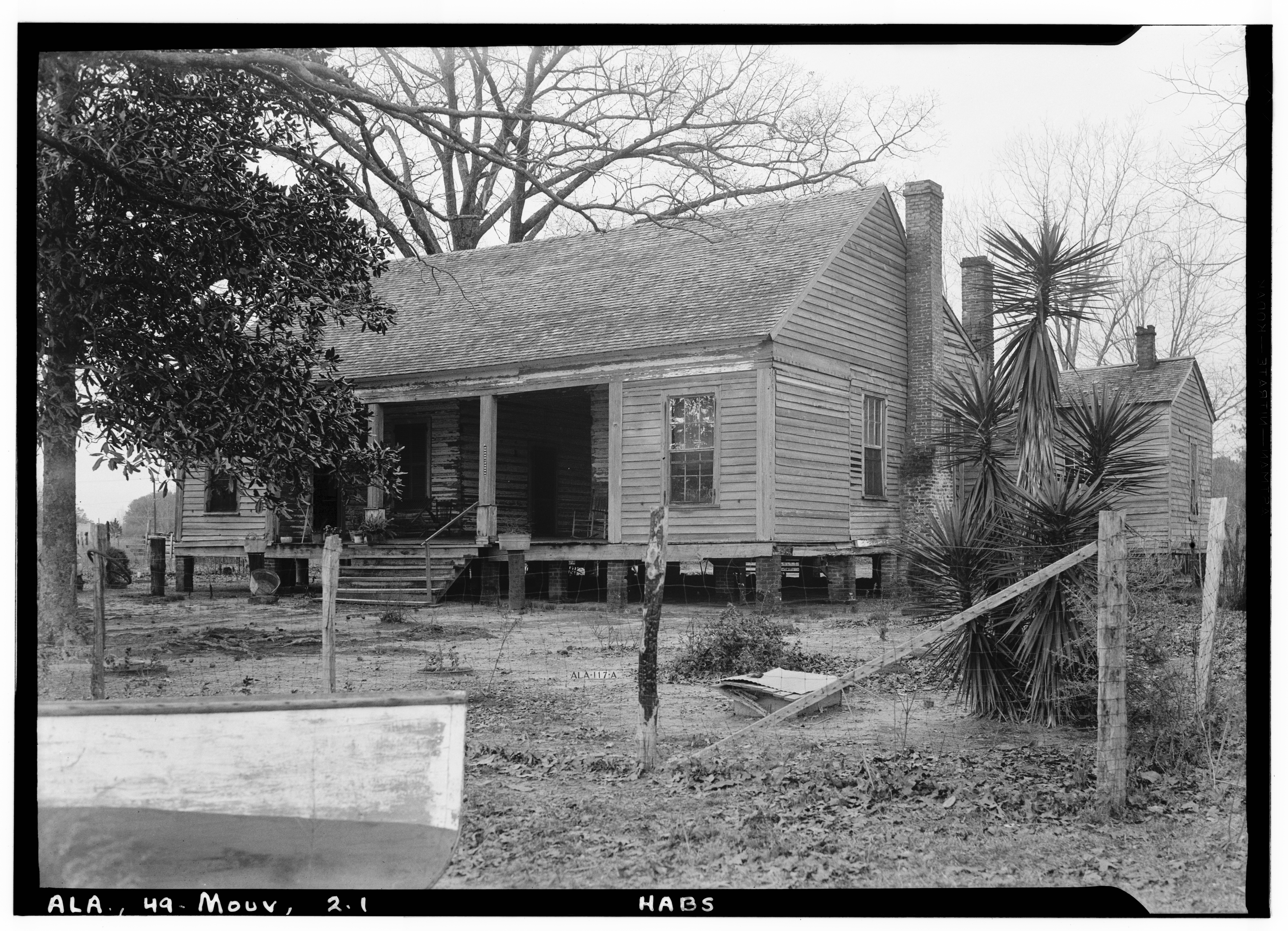
Cooper-Beasley House

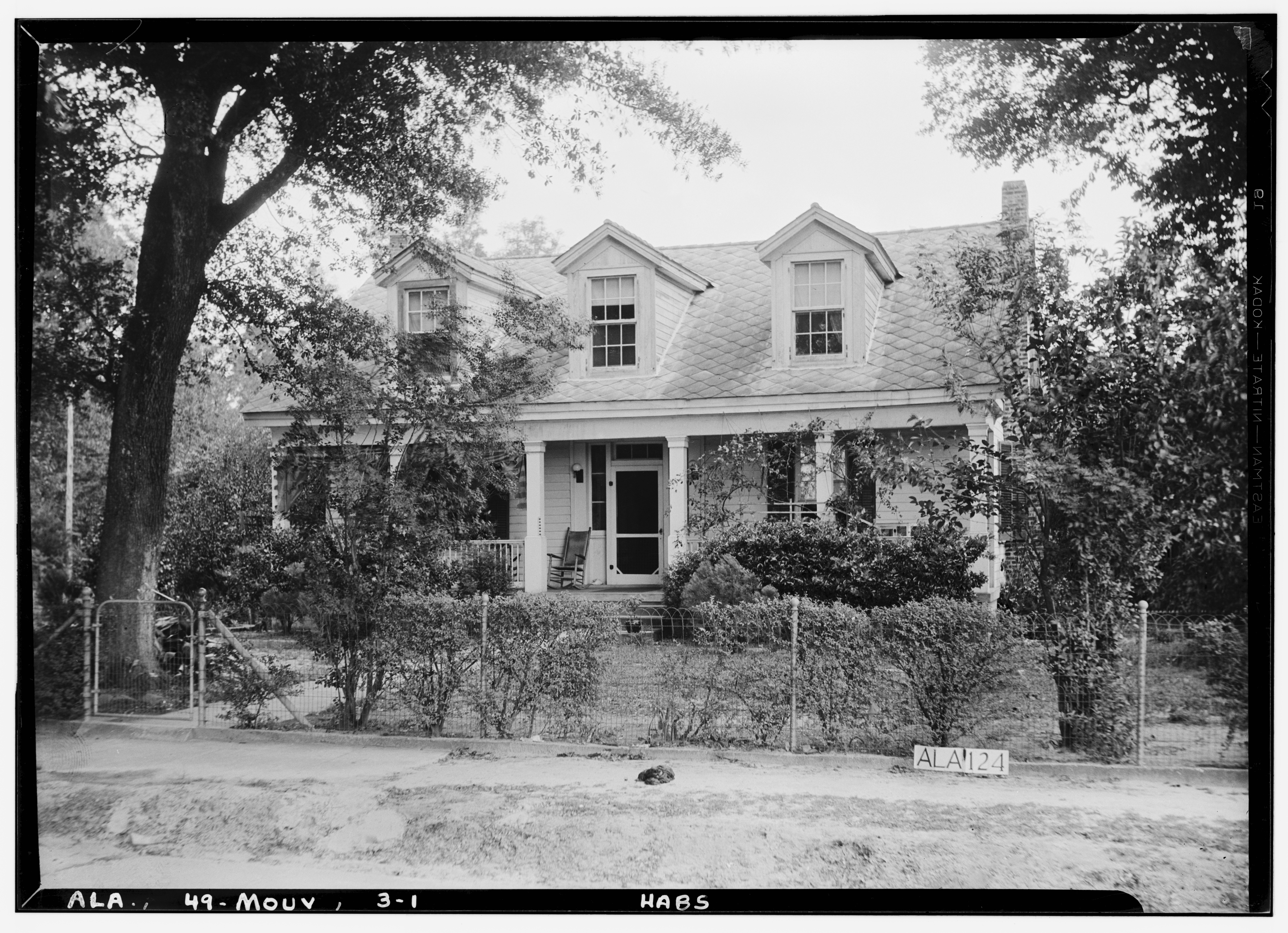
L. B. Curry House

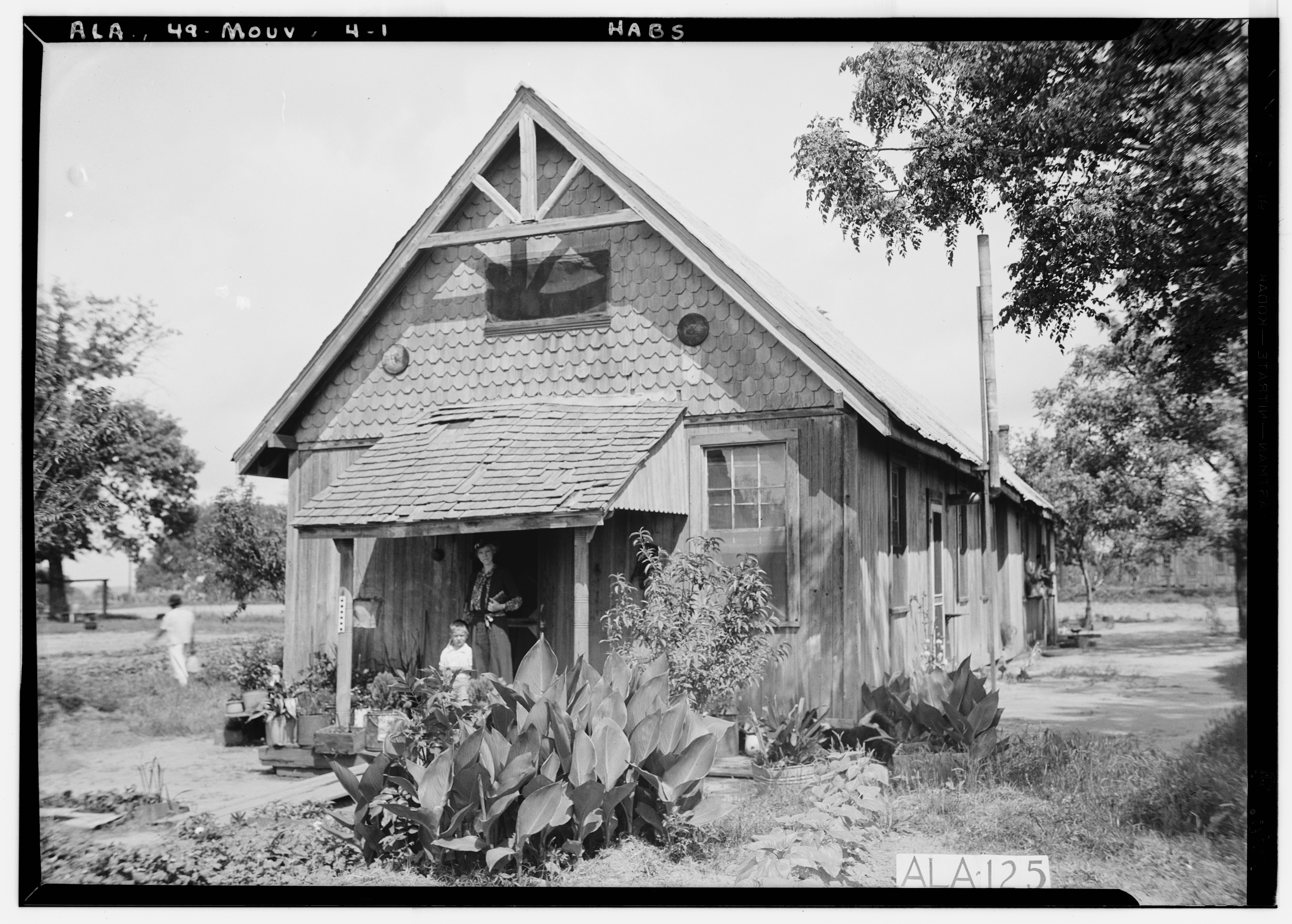
Indian Schoolhouse

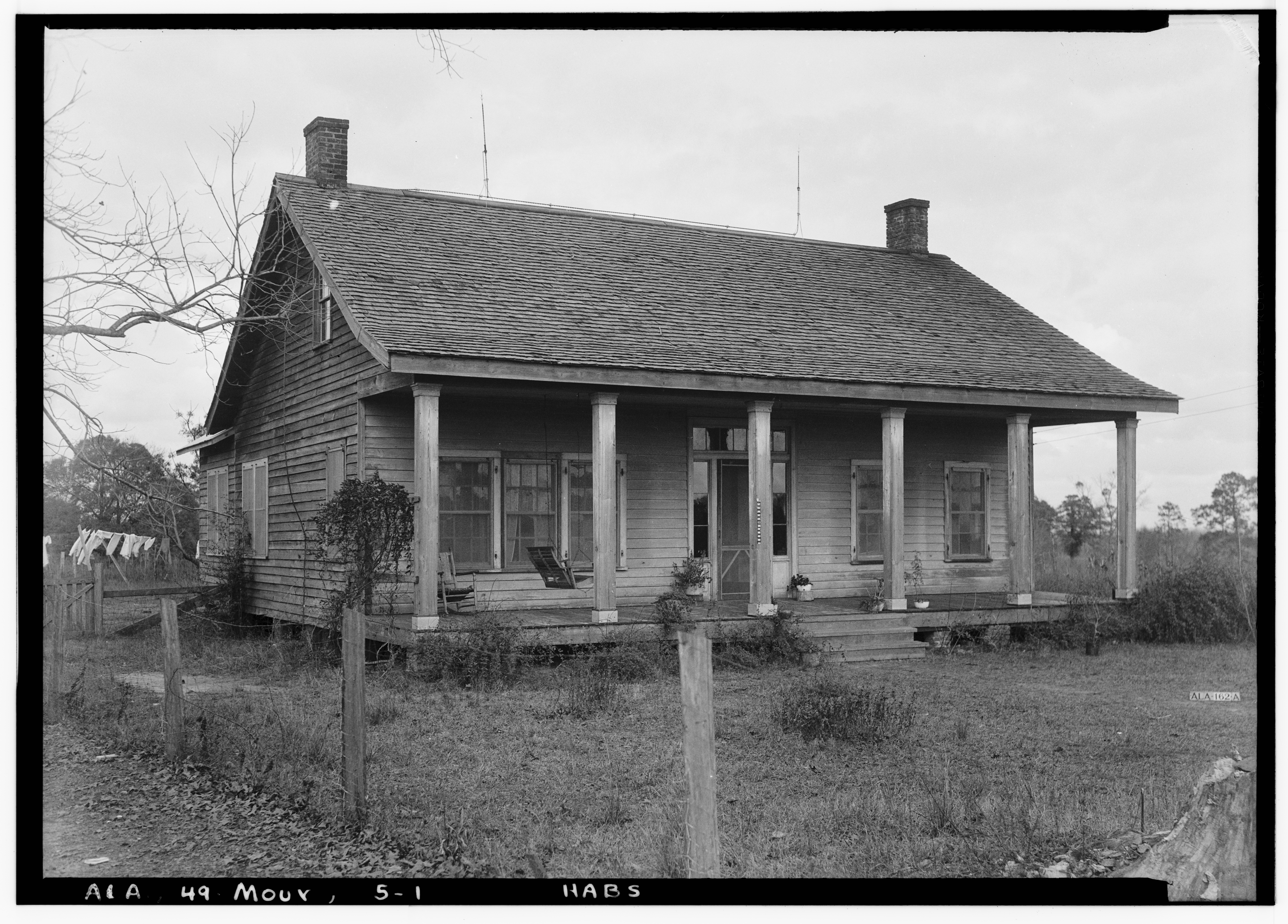
Nelias Fall House
