= Chickasaw City Schools =

School district in Alabama, United States

Location
- 201 North Craft Hwy. Chickasaw, Alabama, USA 36611 United States

District information
- Type: Public
- Grades: K-12
- Established: 2012
- Superintendent: David Wofford
- Schools: Chickasaw Elementary School, K-5; Chickasaw High School, 6-12

Other information
- Website: www.chickasawschools.com

Chickasaw City Schools (CCS) is a school district in Alabama, serving Chickasaw.

The city voted to form its own school system in 2012. Previously it was a part of the Mobile County Public School System.

Chickasaw Elementary School and Chickasaw High School serve the city.
