= Saraland, Alabama =

City in Alabama, United States

- City
- Motto: "Gateway to Progress"
- Location in Mobile County, Alabama
- Coordinates: 30°52′15″N 88°06′18″W
- Country: United States
- State: Alabama
- County: Mobile
- Incorporated: 1957

Government
  - Type: Mayor–council

Area
  - Total: 32.37 sq mi (83.84 km^{2})
  - Land: 32.15 sq mi (83.27 km^{2})
  - Water: 0.22 sq mi (0.57 km^{2})
- Elevation: 30 ft (9.1 m)

Population (2020)
  - Total: 16,171
  - Density: 503/sq mi (194.2/km^{2})
- Time zone: UTC-6 (Central (CST))
  - Summer (DST): UTC-5 (CDT)
- ZIP code: 36571
- Area code: 251
- FIPS code: 01-68160
- GNIS feature ID: 2405422
- Website: www.saraland.org

Saraland is a city in Mobile County, Alabama, United States, and a suburb of Mobile. As of the 2020 census, the population of the city was 16,171, up from 13,405 at the 2010 census. Saraland, part of the Mobile metropolitan area, is the third largest city in Mobile County.

== Geography ==
Saraland is bordered to the southwest by the city of Prichard, to the south by Chickasaw, to the east by the undeveloped northern end of Mobile, and to the northeast by Satsuma and Creola.

U.S. Route 43 (Saraland Boulevard) and Interstate 65 are the main north–south routes through Saraland. U.S. 43 leads south 9 miles (14 km) to downtown Mobile and north 55 miles (89 km) to Jackson, while I-65 leads south 15 miles (24 km) to its terminus at Interstate 10 in southwestern Mobile, and northeast 157 miles (253 km) to Montgomery, the state capital.

According to the U.S. Census Bureau, Saraland has a total area of 32.4 square miles (84 km^{2}), of which 0.32 square miles (0.83 km^{2}), or 0.68%, are water. The city is drained by Bayou Sara, an east-flowing tributary of the Mobile River.

== History ==
The land area that was to become the present-day Saraland was included in a Spanish land grant to Don Diego Alvarez. Hence, descendants of Alvarez were the ones to give the community its first name: Alvarez Station. Later land squatters moved into the area and were able, legally, in 1800 to begin purchasing property. In 1807, a land office was opened in St. Stephens to handle all land transactions. Some of the pioneer families who seized the opportunity to buy up sections were named Alvarez, Rice, Hartley, Moore, LaCoste, Williams, Tool and Cleveland. Eventually, Alvarez Station was called Cleveland Station. The present name of the city is reported to have been given by C.J. DeWitt, a retired minister editor who moved south in 1890 for health reasons. He opened the first post office on the Southern Railroad in 1895. The community is purported to be the namesake of his beloved wife, Sara.

Saraland was sparsely populated during the first part of the 20th century, until an industrial and population boom occurred in neighboring Mobile. Northward expansion of Mobile in the 1940s and 50s brought about the incorporation of Saraland in 1957. At the time of incorporation, the city reported only 125 residents. By the 1960 U.S. Census, annexations had swelled the population to 4,595. In 1980, census figures cited 9,844 Saraland residents. As of the 2020 census, Saraland's population had grown to 16,171.

The worst rail disaster in the history of Amtrak occurred just east of Saraland on Big Bayou Canot on September 22, 1993. At approximately 2:53 AM, Amtrak's Sunset Limited train, powered by three locomotives, and en route from Los Angeles to Miami with 220 passengers and crew aboard, crossed the Bayou Canot bridge at high speed and derailed at a kink in the track caused by a barge captain who rammed the bridge by making a wrong turn in the waterway and failed to report the accident. 47 people, of whom 42 were passengers, were killed, many by drowning, others by fire. Much of the rescue efforts were average citizens of the community who journeyed out in the early morning hours in small fishing boats to help at the scene.

== Demographics ==
Historical population
Census	Pop.	Note	%±
1960	4,595		—
1970	7,840		70.6%
1980	9,833		25.4%
1990	11,751		19.5%
2000	12,288		4.6%
2010	13,405		9.1%
2020	16,171		20.6%
2025 (est.)	16,652	▲	3.0%
U.S. Decennial Census

=== 2020 census ===
As of the 2020 census, Saraland had a population of 16,171. The median age was 38.1 years. 24.5% of residents were under the age of 18 and 16.4% of residents were 65 years of age or older. For every 100 females, there were 91.5 males, and for every 100 females age 18 and over there were 89.2 males.

78.2% of residents lived in urban areas, while 21.8% lived in rural areas.

There were 6,235 households in Saraland, including 3,615 families. Of all households, 35.8% had children under the age of 18 living in them. Of all households, 51.2% were married-couple households, 15.3% were households with a male householder and no spouse or partner present, and 28.1% were households with a female householder and no spouse or partner present. About 24.1% of all households were made up of individuals and 10.2% had someone living alone who was 65 years of age or older.

There were 6,698 housing units, of which 6.9% were vacant. The homeowner vacancy rate was 1.6% and the rental vacancy rate was 8.3%.

Saraland racial composition
Race	Num.	Perc.
White (non-Hispanic)	12,378	76.54%
Black or African American (non-Hispanic)	2,261	13.98%
Native American	225	1.39%
Asian	189	1.17%
Pacific Islander	6	0.04%
Other/Mixed	801	4.95%
Hispanic or Latino	311	1.92%

=== 2010 census ===
At the 2010 census there were 13,405 people in 5,208 households, including 3,757 families, in the city. The population density was 558.5 inhabitants per square mile (215.6/km^{2}). There were 5,828 housing units at an average density of 266.1 per square mile (102.7/km^{2}). The racial makeup of the city was 83.7% White, 12.0% Black or African American, 0.8% Native American, 0.6% Asian, 0.1% Pacific Islander, 1.5% from other races, and 1.4% from two or more races. 2.5% of the population were Hispanic or Latino of any race.

Of the 5,208 households 27.9% had children under the age of 18 living with them, 54.4% were married couples living together, 13.4% had a female householder with no husband present, and 27.9% were non-families. 22.8% of households were one person and 10.0% were one person aged 65 or older. The average household size was 2.57 and the average family size was 2.01.

The age distribution was 22.9% under the age of 18, 8.0% from 18 to 24, 25.8% from 25 to 44, 27.5% from 45 to 64, and 15.8% 65 or older. The median age was 40 years. For every 100 females, there were 97.7 males. For every 100 females age 18 and over, there were 101.9 males.

The median household income was $48,721 and the median family income was $54,845. Males had a median income of $44,201 versus $31,235 for females. The per capita income for the city was $22,192. About 8.8% of families and 14.9% of the population were below the poverty line, including 28.3% of those under age 18 and 7.0% of those age 65 or over.

=== 2000 census ===
At the 2000 census there were 12,288 people in 4,810 households, including 3,602 families, in the city. The population density was 560.9 inhabitants per square mile (216.6/km^{2}). There were 5,138 housing units at an average density of 234.5 per square mile (90.5/km^{2}). The racial makeup of the city was 88.50% White, 8.97% Black or African American, 0.56% Native American, 0.46% Asian, 0.01% Pacific Islander, 0.37% from other races, and 1.13% from two or more races. 1.17% of the population were Hispanic or Latino of any race.

Of the 4,810 households 31.8% had children under the age of 18 living with them, 61.0% were married couples living together, 10.5% had a female householder with no husband present, and 25.1% were non-families. 21.2% of households were one person and 8.1% were one person aged 65 or older. The average household size was 2.55 and the average family size was 2.97.

The age distribution was 23.4% under the age of 18, 9.4% from 18 to 24, 29.3% from 25 to 44, 24.4% from 45 to 64, and 13.5% 65 or older. The median age was 37 years. For every 100 females, there were 95.4 males. For every 100 females age 18 and over, there were 92.2 males.

The median household income was $38,318 and the median family income was $43,471. Males had a median income of $35,431 versus $22,787 for females. The per capita income for the city was $19,470. About 7.4% of families and 9.0% of the population were below the poverty line, including 12.2% of those under age 18 and 8.9% of those age 65 or over.

== Transportation ==
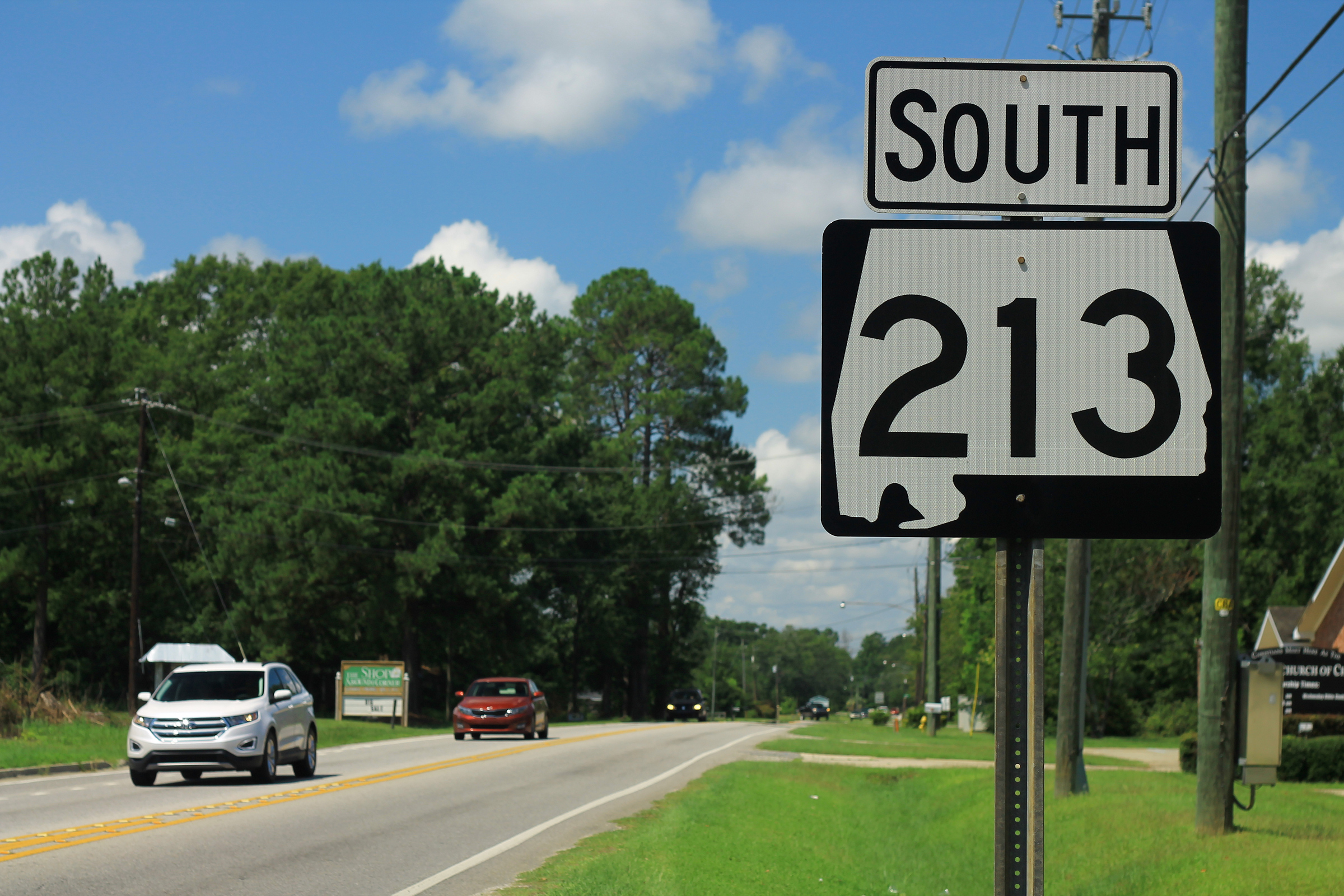
SR 213 South Sign in Saraland

- Interstate 65
- US 43
- SR 158
- SR 213
- SR 13

== Economy ==
- Royal Dutch Shell used to operate the Saraland Refinery in Saraland, now owned by Vertex Energy.
- Alorica Telecommunications Center
- China Doll, a brand of rice and beans.

Redwing Carriers, Inc. in Saraland had been identified as having a Superfund site which was at risk from climate change, due to high wildfire hazard potential, flood hazard, or potential for damage in Category 4 or 5 hurricanes. As of September 2, 2014, Redwing Carriers, Inc. in Saraland was removed from the National Priorities List (NPL) because no hazardous waste remains on site.

== Education ==
=== Primary and secondary schools ===
==== Public schools ====
Saraland is served by the Saraland Board of Education. Residents are zoned to Saraland Early Education Center, Saraland Elementary School, Saraland (formerly Adams) Middle School, and Saraland High School.

In June 2006, the City of Saraland voted to break away from the Mobile County Public School System and form its own school system. The school district came into effect in autumn 2008; at the time Saraland Elementary and Adams Middle were a part of the city district, but high schoolers had to attend county schools because Saraland High School was not yet open. Prior to the split of the City of Saraland from the county system in 2009, Saraland was zoned to Satsuma High School. 2011 was the final year in which Saraland residents were permitted by the county to attend county schools.

Several years prior to 2009 officials of Saraland, Satsuma, and Chickasaw contemplated forming the "Delta School District."

==== Private schools ====
Private schools within Saraland include Evangel Christian School, North Mobile Christian School, and the Saraland Yeshiva right outside of the city limits.

== Notable people ==
- Ann Casey, retired professional wrestler
- Cordale Flott, National Football League Cornerback for the New York Giants.
- Velus Jones Jr, National Football League wide receiver for the Chicago Bears.
- Matt Peacock (baseball), Professional Baseball Pitcher
- Jay Prosch, National Football League fullback for the Houston Texans
- Ryan Coleman-Williams, College Wide Receiver for the Alabama Crimson Tide
