= Saraland City Schools =

School district in Alabama, United States

Saraland City Schools (SCS) is a school district serving and operated by Saraland, Alabama, United States.

The district consists of four schools, Saraland Early Education Center, Saraland Elementary School, Saraland (formerly Adams) Middle School, and Saraland High School.

The high school students feed into Saraland Middle School; the students were rezoned to Saraland High School in January 2010.

As of 2013 non-residents wishing to send their children to Saraland schools must pay $1,500 every year per child.

== History ==
In June 2006, the Saraland residents voted in favor (70%) to break away from the Mobile County Public School System.

== School uniforms ==
The district requires its students to wear school uniforms.
