= Mobile County Public School System =

School district in Alabama

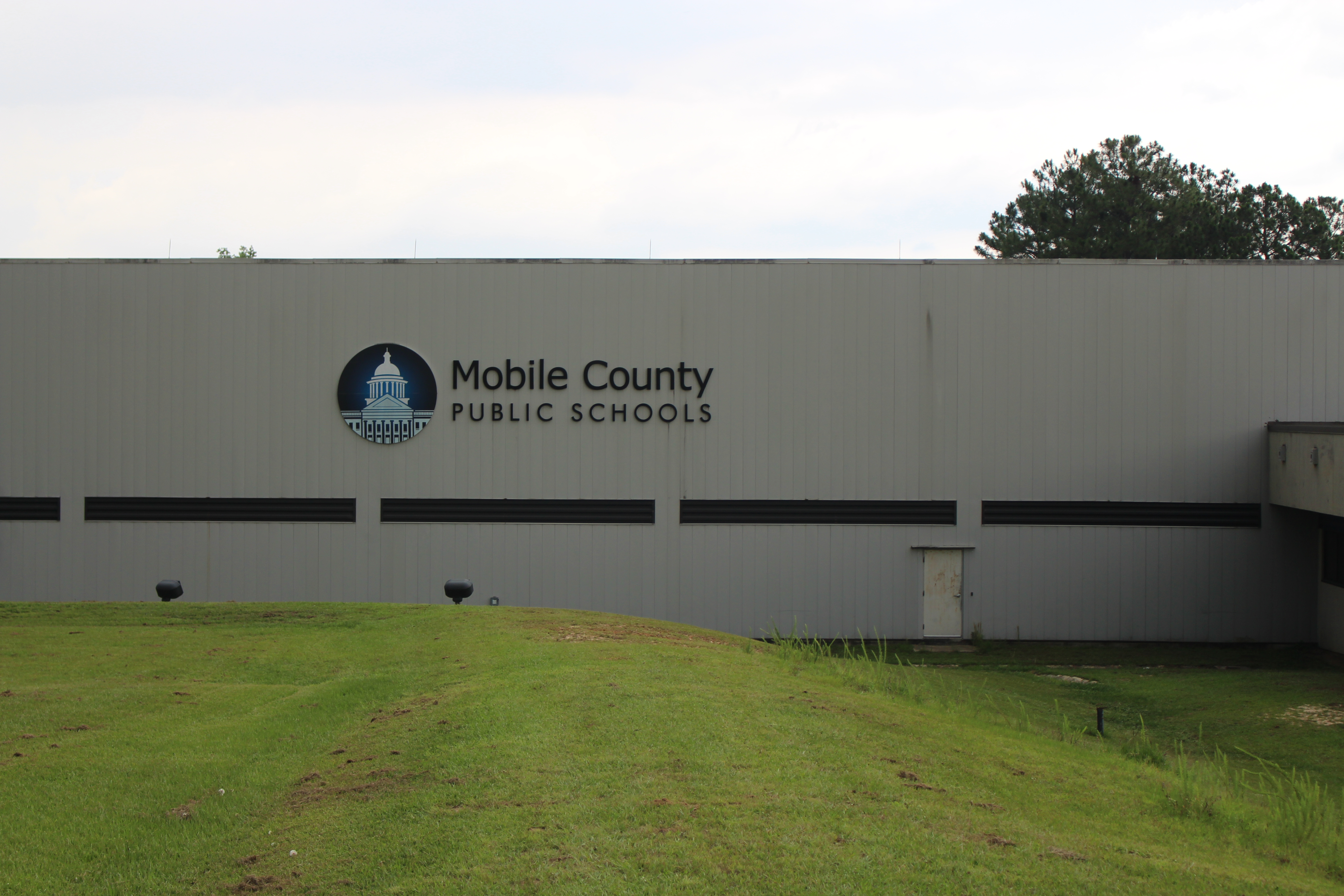

Address
- 1 Magnum Pass Mobile, Alabama, 36618; United States
- Coordinates: 30°43′15″N 88°13′25″W

District information
- Established: 1836; 190 years ago
- Superintendent: Chresal D. Threadgill
- Schools: 89
- Budget: $648.92 million

Students and staff
- Enrollment: 57,910 (71st-largest in U.S.)
- Teachers: 7,951

Other information
- Website: www.mcpss.com

Mobile County Public School System (MCPSS) is a school district based in unincorporated Mobile County, Alabama, United States. The system currently serves areas of Mobile County, including the city of Mobile, with the exception of the cities of Saraland, Satsuma and Chickasaw. Saraland voted to separate its schools from Mobile County in 2006, with Satsuma and Chickasaw following suit in 2012. The system serves urban, suburban, and rural areas. All schools in the system are required to adopt school uniform policies. It is the largest school system in Alabama and the 71st largest school system in the United States.

== History ==
=== Early ===
The current Mobile County Public School System can trace its beginnings to the Board of School Commissioners of Mobile County, created by the Alabama Legislature through an act passed on January 10, 1826. This was the first education board created in Alabama.

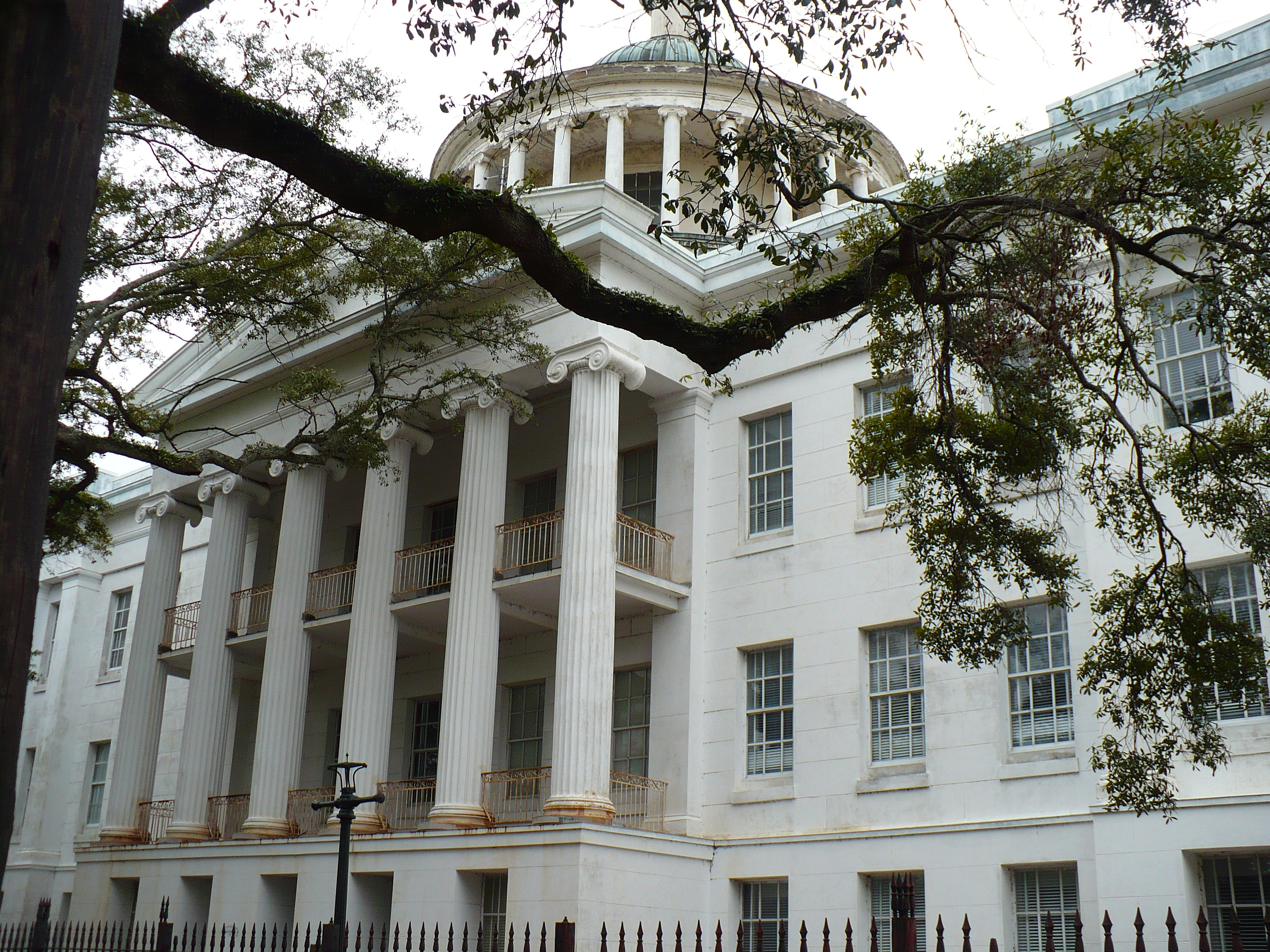
Barton Academy in downtown Mobile.

The act to establish the board was introduced by Willoughby Barton, a legislator from Mobile. The first school building built by the board, Barton Academy, was named in his honor. It was built in the block between Government, Cedar, Conti, and Lawrence Streets, which was purchased by this first board for $2750 in 1830. Lack of funding stalled progress on the project until an act was passed in the state legislature that allowed the commissioners to raise funds through a lottery. By early 1836 the board had managed to pull together $50,000 in lottery funds, a $15,000 municipal loan, and additional private donations with which to commence building a school. This included a large private donation from local millionaire Henry Hitchcock, who was also on the building committee. Construction commenced on February 13, 1836, and, after several delays, was finally completed in January 1839.

Following completion of Barton Academy, the Board of School Commissioners of Mobile County then allowed the building to be used for private and denominational schools, with some funding appropriated to them by the commissioners. An act in 1846 allowed for taxes to be collected for the establishment of a free Methodist school by the commission. The commission was behind another act on February 9, 1852, that would have allowed the commission to sell the building, which was now in need of maintenance and repairs, and distribute the proceeds among the existing schools, if approved by the voters. The electorate rejected this and subsequently elected a new board of commissioners.

After the election of the new board, the building was repaired and the system was reorganized. The building reopened as a public school in November 1852. The school was closed for the duration of the American Civil War. The Girls High School reopened in 1865, followed by the Boys High School in 1870. Both would continue at Barton until the opening of Murphy High School in 1926. It continued to serve as a school building until the 1960s when it was converted into the central office for the Mobile County Public School System. The school board relocated to a new central office complex in 2007, leaving the historic building vacant. The Barton Academy building was added to Alabama Historical Commission's "Places in Peril" list in 2009.

=== Desegregation ===
In 1963 three African-American students brought a case against the Mobile County School Board for being denied admission to Murphy High School. The court ordered that the three students be admitted to Murphy for the 1964 school year, leading to the desegregation of Mobile County's school system. The Civil Rights Movement led to the end of legal racial segregation with passage of the Civil Rights Act of 1964.

=== Recent ===
In 1983 there were allegations that the Mobile County school board deliberately ignored an injunction against prayer led by teachers, but that year, Lewis F. Powell, a member of the Supreme Court of the United States, declined not to bring contempt proceedings against the district's board. Later though, the schools were ordered to stop mandating school prayer on a permanent basis by the U.S. Supreme Court in Wallace v. Jaffree. In 1987, there was another lawsuit alleging that secular humanism was being promoted but this claim was rejected in Smith v. Board of School Commissioners of Mobile County.

In 1991 MCPSS was the largest school district in Alabama. In 1991 Governor of Alabama Guy Hunt announced that the state education budget would decrease by $145 million. Therefore, the MCPSS administration prepared for a possible closure.

In 2001 superintendent Harold W. Dodge proposed removing all extracurricular activities from MCPSS schools in order to save $1.3 million. This money funded supplemental salaries for people who do instruction for extracurricular activities, including American football programs.

In 2013, the Southern Poverty Law Center won a permanent settlement with the school district that prohibits suspending students for violating the school uniform policy.

== Operations ==
As of 2012 the out-of-district tuition for Mobile County schools is $2,200 per student per year.

Beginning in the 1960s the district headquarters were in the former Barton Academy. In 2004 the board of trustees was trying to acquire a former KBR, Inc. facility to where it could move the headquarters. Harold Dodge, the superintendent, decided to use the KBR site as his recommendation to the board of trustees. In 2007 the headquarters moved to its current location.

== Student body ==
As of 2011, the county school system had 60,946 students, making it the largest school district in Alabama. This was a decrease of 916 students from the previous school year, with a decrease in 502 students in the traditional county schools. Much of the remaining population loss resulted from the termination of a contract with Alternatives Unlimited Inc., an outside company, to operate Drop Back In Academy. As of 2011, schools east of Interstate 65 usually had more severe decreases in their student bodies than schools west of the interstate.

== Schools ==
=== High ===
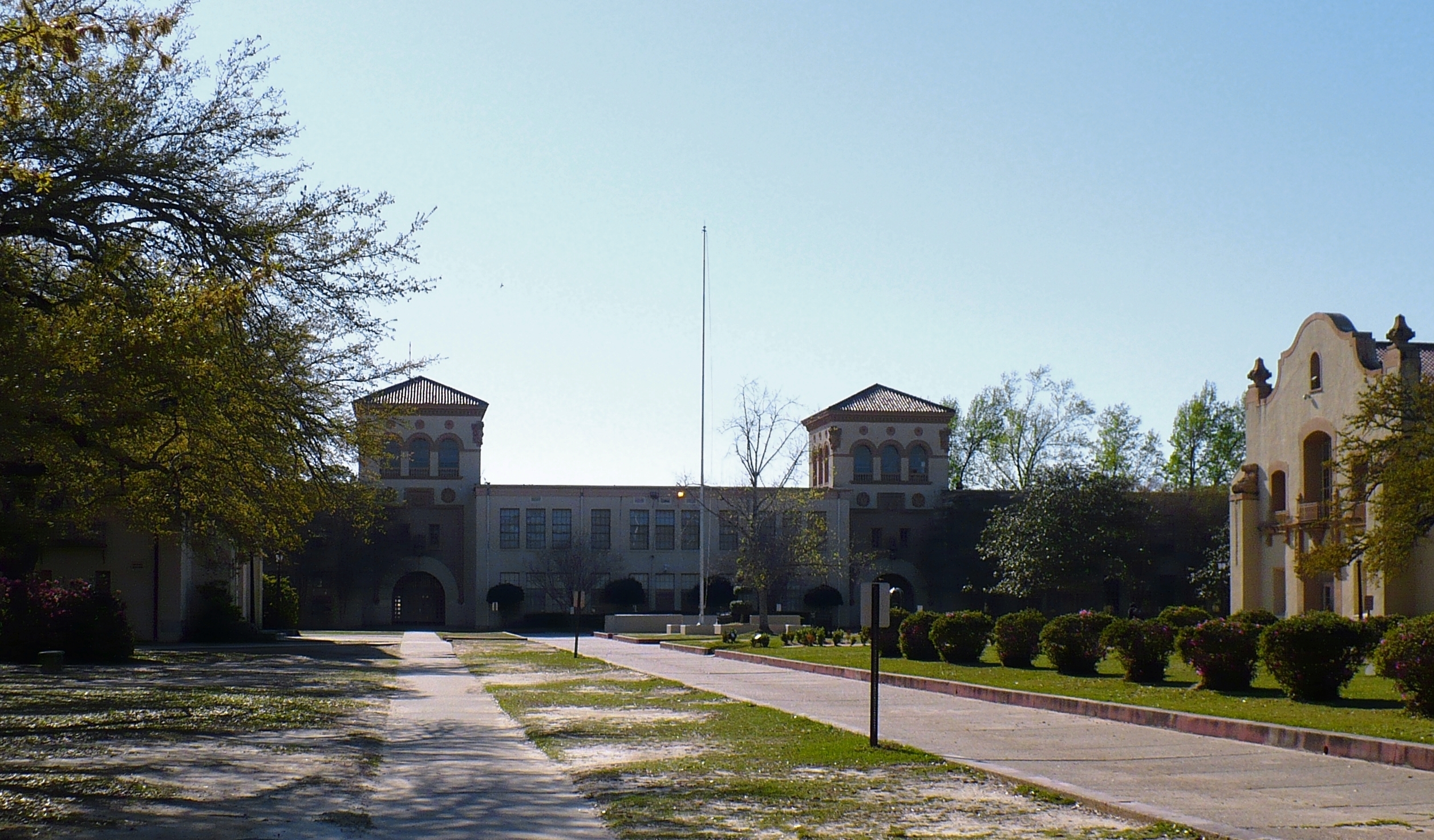
Murphy High School in Midtown Mobile.

There are currently 17 high schools operated by the MCPSS.

- Baker (Mobile)
- B. C. Rain High School (Mobile)
- Blount (Eight Mile)
- Bryant Career Technical (Irvington)
- Bryant (Irvington)
- Citronelle (Citronelle)
- Continuous Learning Center (Mobile)
- Davidson (Mobile)
- Faulkner Vocational (Prichard)
- LeFlore Magnet (Mobile)
- Mary G. Montgomery (Semmes)
- Murphy (Mobile)
- H.L. Sonny Callahan School for the Deaf & Blind (K-12) (Mobile)
- The Pathway School (K-5 Campus & 6-12 Campus)(Mobile)
- Theodore (Theodore)
- Vigor (Prichard)
- Williamson (Mobile)

=== Middle ===
There are currently 19 middle schools operated by the MCPSS.

- Alba (Bayou La Batre)
- Barton Academy of Advanced World Studies (Mobile)
- Burns (Mobile)
- Calloway-Smith (Mobile)
- Causey (Mobile)
- Clark-Shaw Magnet School (Mobile)
- Denton Magnet School of Technology (Mobile)
- Dunbar Creative and Performing Arts Magnet School (Mobile)
- Grand Bay (Grand Bay)
- Hankins (Theodore)
- Lott (Citronelle)
- Mobile County Training School (Prichard)
- Phillips Preparatory (Mobile)
- Pillans (Mobile)
- Scarborough (Mobile)
- Semmes (Semmes)
- Washington (Toulminville)

=== K-8 ===
- Chastang-Fournier K-8 School
- North Mobile County K-8th (Axis)

=== Elementary ===
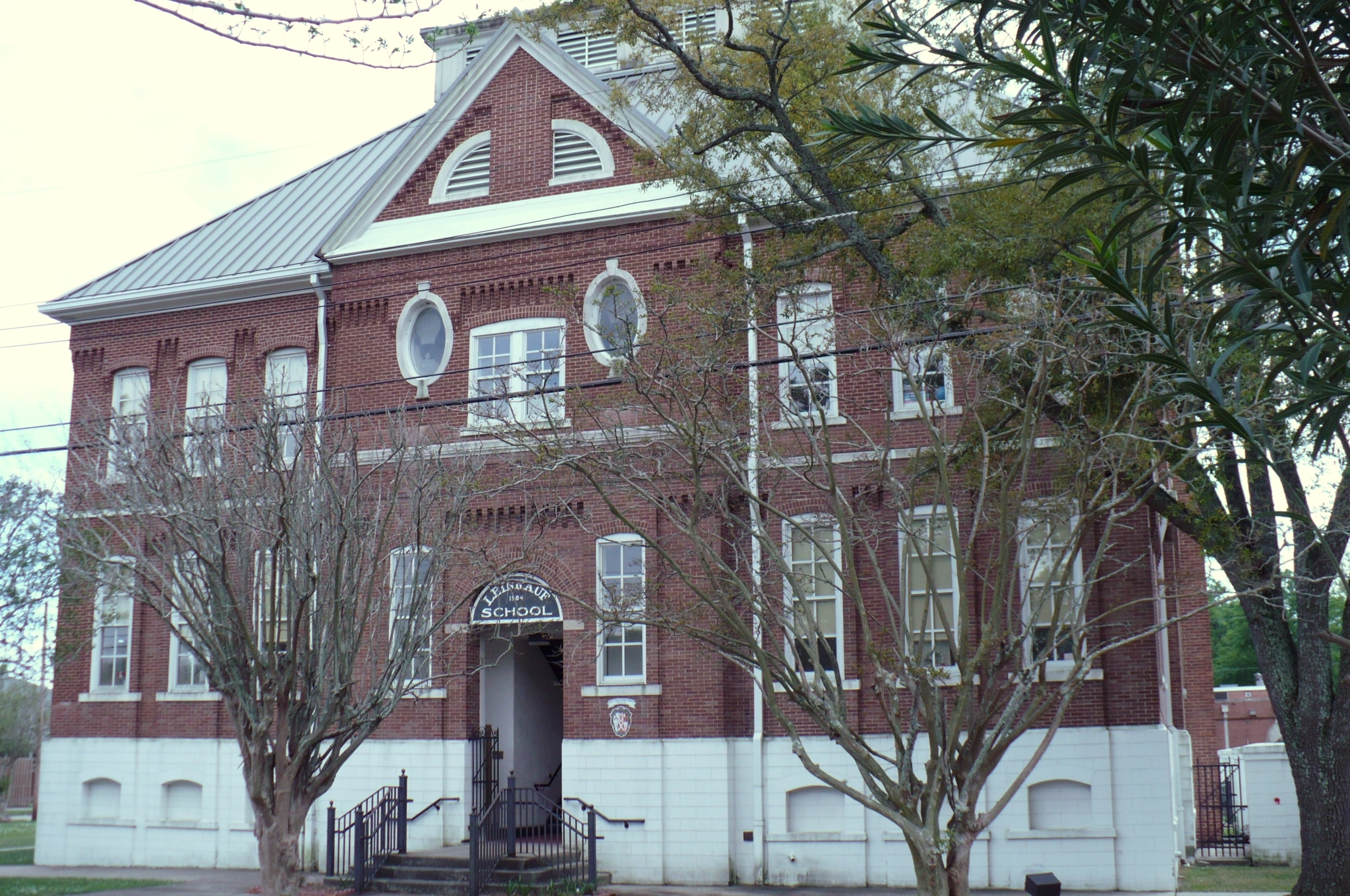
The former Leinkauf School in the Leinkauf Historic District.

There are currently 53 elementary schools operated by the MCPSS.

- Anna Booth (Irvington)
- Allentown (Semmes)
- Augusta Evans School K-12 (Mobile)
- Breitling (Grand Bay)
- Burroughs (Theodore)
- Calcedeaver (Mount Vernon)
- Castlen (Grand Bay)
- Collier (Mobile)
- Collins-Rhodes (Eight Mile)
- Council Traditional School (Mobile)
- Craighead (Mobile)
- Dauphin Island (Dauphin Island)
- Davis (Theodore)
- Dawes 3-5 (Mobile)
- Dixon (Irvington)
- Dodge (Mobile)
- E. R. Dickson (Mobile)
- Eichold-Mertz Magnet School of Math, Science & Technology School(Mobile)
- Fonde (Mobile)
- Forest Hill (Mobile)
- Gilliard (Mobile)
- Grant (Prichard)
- Griggs (Tillman's Corner)
- Hall (Mobile)
- Hollinger's Island (Hollinger's Island)
- Holloway (Mobile)
- Howard (Mobile)
- Hutchens (Mobile)
- Indian Springs (Eight Mile)
- John Will (Mobile)
- Just 4 Development Laboratory (Mobile)
- Leinkauf (Mobile)
- Mary B. Austin (Mobile)
- Maryvale (Mobile)
- McDavid-Jones (Citronelle)
- Meadowlake (Mobile)
- Morningside (Mobile)
- O'Rourke (Mobile)
- Old Shell Road Magnet (Mobile)
- Orchard (Mobile)
- Pearl Haskew (Irvington)
- Robbins (Prichard)
- Semmes (Semmes)
- Shepard (Mobile)
- Spencer-Westlawn (Mobile)
- St. Elmo (Irvington)
- Tanner Williams (Wilmer)
- Taylor-White (Mobile)
- Turner (Wilmer)
- Whitley (Prichard)
- Wilmer (Wilmer)

== Failing schools ==
Statewide testing ranks the schools in Alabama. Those in the bottom six percent are listed as "failing." As of early 2018, nine local schools were included in this category:

- Booker T Washington Middle School
- Mattie T Blount High School
- Mobile County Training Middle School
- CL Scarborough Model Middle School
- John L Leflore Magnet School
- Chastang-Fournier Middle School
- CF Vigor High School
- Lillie B Williamson High School

== Governing body ==
The governing body of the Mobile County Public School System is the Mobile County Board of Education. The Board's members, of which there are five that represent different districts, are elected to staggered six-year terms.

- District 1: Douglas L. Harwell, Commissioner
- District 2: Don Stringfellow, Commissioner
- District 3: Dr. Reginald Crenshaw, President/Commissioner
- District 4: Sherry Dillihay-McDade, Commissioner
- District 5: Dr. William Foster, Vice President/Commissioner

== Former schools ==
Saraland Elementary School and Adams Middle School left the district in April 2008; they are now operated by the Saraland City Schools. Satsuma High School, Lee Primary and Lee Intermediate (Satsuma) left the district in 2012 and are a part of the Satsuma City School System. In 2012, Chickasaw voted to separate and now has the Chickasaw City Schools.
