= Citronelle, Alabama =

City in the United States

- City
- Flag Seal
- Nickname: "The Best Kept Secret in Southern Alabama"
- Location in Mobile County, Alabama
- Coordinates: 31°06′33″N 88°15′05″W
- Country: United States
- State: Alabama
- County: Mobile

Area
  - Total: 26.12 sq mi (67.65 km^{2})
  - Land: 25.85 sq mi (66.94 km^{2})
  - Water: 0.27 sq mi (0.71 km^{2})
- Elevation: 341 ft (104 m)

Population (2020)
  - Total: 3,946
  - Density: 1,020/sq mi (392/km^{2})
- Time zone: UTC-6 (Central (CST))
  - Summer (DST): UTC-5 (CDT)
- ZIP code: 36522
- Area code: 251
- FIPS code: 01-15064
- GNIS feature ID: 2404051
- Website: www.cityofcitronelle.com

Citronelle is a city on the northern border of Mobile County, Alabama, United States. At the 2020 census, the population was 3,946. It is included in the Mobile metropolitan statistical area and is about 34 miles (55 km) north of Mobile.

== History ==
The area was inhabited by indigenous peoples for thousands of years. By the time of European contact, the historic Choctaw and Creek people hunted in the area.

The first known European explorers of this area were French in the 18th century. They learned that the land had healing herbs and mineral springs. The area was settled in 1811 and established as a jurisdiction (incorporated) in 1892. The name "Citronelle" is French and is derived from the citronella plant. In the late 19th century, the town became a popular resort destination because of the climate, herbs, and healing waters. Many hotels were built to accommodate the surge of visitors.

On May 4, 1865, one of the last significant Confederate armies was surrendered by Lieutenant General Richard Taylor under the "Surrender Oak". This was the third in the series of five major surrenders of armies that ended the war. The two previous surrenders occurred at Appomattox Court House, Virginia, between Confederate General Robert E. Lee and US General Ulysses S. Grant; and the second and largest at Bennett Place near Durham, North Carolina between US General William T. Sherman and Confederate General Joseph E. Johnston.

A living history/reenactment of the surrender occurs each year in Citronelle. The historic "Surrender Oak" no longer stands, as it was destroyed by a hurricane in 1902.

In 1955, oil was discovered in the area. Today Citronelle is known as the oil capital of Alabama.

== Geology ==
Citronelle developed on what is known as the Citronelle Dome, a salt dome formation that is still rising, as shown by the radial drainage of streams away from the center. In 1955 oil was discovered in this geologic structure at a greater depth than had previously been considered as feasible. The Citronelle Dome was developed as among the first of many "deep" oil fields. The discovery well yielded oil from the Glen Rose Formation at a depth of 10,879 feet (3,316 m).

"Citronelle Dome is a giant salt-cored anticline in the eastern Mississippi Interior Salt Basin of southwest Alabama. The dome forms an elliptical structural closure containing multiple opportunities for enhanced oil recovery (EOR) and saline reservoir CO2 sequestration. Citronelle Oil Field, located on the crest of the dome, has produced more than 169 million barrels (27 million cubic metres) of 42-46° American Petroleum Institute (API) gravity oil from the Lower Cretaceous Donovan Sand."

== Geography ==
Citronelle is located in northern Mobile County. The northern border of the city is at the Washington County line. U.S. Route 45 runs from north to south through the city, to the west of the downtown area. Via US 45, downtown Mobile is 34 miles (55 km) to the south, and State Line, Mississippi is 30 miles (48 km) to the northwest.

According to the U.S. Census Bureau, the city of Citronelle has a total area of 26.1 square miles (68 km^{2}), of which 25.8 square miles (67 km^{2}) are land and 0.3 square miles (0.78 km^{2}), or 1.06%, are water.

== Demographics ==
Historical population
Census	Pop.	Note	%±
1850	250		—
1880	169		—
1900	696		—
1910	935		34.3%
1920	932		−0.3%
1930	1,082		16.1%
1940	1,057		−2.3%
1950	1,350		27.7%
1960	1,918		42.1%
1970	1,935		0.9%
1980	2,841		46.8%
1990	3,671		29.2%
2000	3,659		−0.3%
2010	3,905		6.7%
2020	3,946		1.0%
U.S. Decennial Census; 2013 Estimate

=== Racial and ethnic composition ===
Citronelle city, Alabama – Racial and ethnic composition Note: the US Census treats Hispanic/Latino as an ethnic category. This table excludes Latinos from the racial categories and assigns them to a separate category. Hispanics/Latinos may be of any race.
Race / Ethnicity (NH = Non-Hispanic)	Pop 1980	Pop 1990	Pop 2000	Pop 2010	Pop 2020	% 1980	% 1990	% 2000	% 2010	% 2020
White alone (NH)	2,235	2,925	2,806	2,737	2,592	78.67%	79.68%	76.69%	70.09%	65.69%
Black or African American alone (NH)	557	690	680	788	782	19.61%	18.80%	18.58%	20.18%	19.82%
Native American or Alaska Native alone (NH)	26	46	98	186	232	0.92%	1.25%	2.68%	4.76%	5.88%
Asian alone (NH)	0	2	5	16	13	0.00%	0.05%	0.14%	0.41%	0.33%
Native Hawaiian or Pacific Islander alone (NH)	x	x	1	0	1	x	x	0.03%	0.00%	0.03%
Other race alone (NH)	0	0	3	4	11	0.00%	0.00%	0.08%	0.10%	0.28%
Mixed race or Multiracial (NH)	x	x	36	71	249	x	x	0.98%	1.82%	6.31%
Hispanic or Latino (any race)	23	8	30	103	66	0.81%	0.22%	0.82%	2.64%	1.67%
Total	2,841	3,671	3,659	3,905	3,946	100.00%	100.00%	100.00%	100.00%	100.00%

=== 2020 census ===
As of the 2020 census, there were 3,946 people, 1,489 households, and 1,021 families residing in the city.

The median age was 38.5 years. 26.4% of residents were under the age of 18 and 17.8% of residents were 65 years of age or older. For every 100 females there were 94.9 males, and for every 100 females age 18 and over there were 87.5 males age 18 and over.

0.0% of residents lived in urban areas, while 100.0% lived in rural areas.

There were 1,489 households in Citronelle, of which 36.5% had children under the age of 18 living in them. Of all households, 45.2% were married-couple households, 18.7% were households with a male householder and no spouse or partner present, and 30.2% were households with a female householder and no spouse or partner present. About 27.0% of all households were made up of individuals and 12.8% had someone living alone who was 65 years of age or older.

There were 1,689 housing units, of which 11.8% were vacant. The homeowner vacancy rate was 4.1% and the rental vacancy rate was 10.3%.

=== 2010 census ===
As of 2010 Citronelle had a population of 3,905. The racial and ethnic composition of the population was 70.7% white, 20.2% black or African American, 4.9% Native American, 0.5% Asian, 1.5% from some other race, 2.2% reporting two or more races and 2.6% Hispanic or Latino from any race.

=== 2000 census ===
As of the census of 2000, there were 3,659 people, 1,318 households, and 1,009 families residing in the city. The population density was 149.9 inhabitants per square mile (57.9/km^{2}). There were 1,441 housing units at an average density of 59.0 per square mile (22.8/km^{2}). The racial makeup of the city was 76.96% White, 18.61% Black or African American, 2.76% Native American, 0.14% Asian, 0.03% Pacific Islander, 0.25% from other races, and 1.26% from two or more races. 0.82% of the population were Hispanic or Latino of any race.

There were 1,318 households, out of which 38.3% had children under the age of 18 living with them, 57.2% were married couples living together, 15.0% had a female householder with no husband present, and 23.4% were non-families. 22.3% of all households were made up of individuals, and 10.8% had someone living alone who was 65 years of age or older. The average household size was 2.73 and the average family size was 3.19.

In the city, the population was spread out, with 28.3% under the age of 18, 9.9% from 18 to 24, 26.9% from 25 to 44, 21.7% from 45 to 64, and 13.1% who were 65 years of age or older. The median age was 35 years. For every 100 females, there were 90.9 males. For every 100 females age 18 and over, there were 87.7 males.

The median income for a household in the city was $31,739, and the median income for a family was $39,922. Males had a median income of $32,200 versus $19,702 for females. The per capita income for the city was $16,455. About 12.0% of families and 15.4% of the population were below the poverty line, including 21.1% of those under age 18 and 19.1% of those age 65 or over.

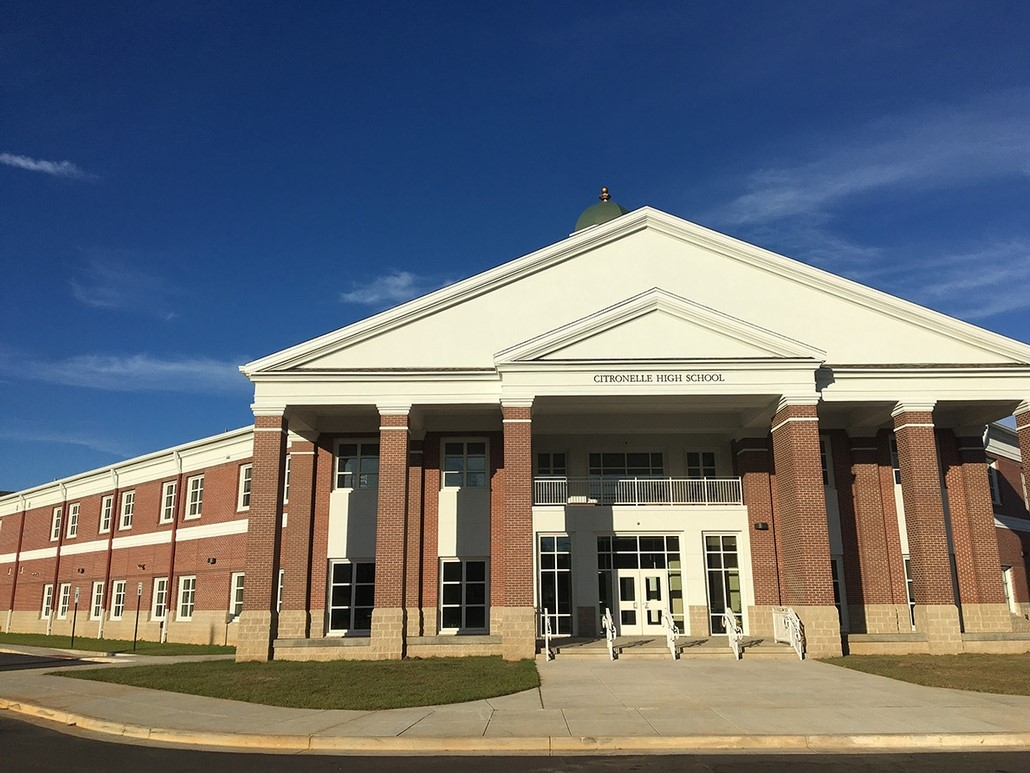
Citronelle High School

== Education ==
The city is served by the Mobile County Public School System and has the following public schools: McDavid-Jones Elementary School (K-5), Lott Middle School (6–8), and Citronelle High School (9–12).

== Notable people ==
- Bama Rowell, former professional baseball player, was born and raised in Citronelle.

== See also ==
- 2016 Citronelle homicides
