= List of lighthouses in Alabama =

This is a list of all lighthouses in the U.S. state of Alabama as identified by the United States Coast Guard and other historical sources. There is only one active light in the state, though another has been replaced by a skeleton tower; a third still stands but is inactive. The rest have all been destroyed.

Focal height and coordinates are taken from the 1907 United States Coast Guard Light List, while location and dates of activation, automation, and deactivation are taken from the United States Coast Guard Historical information site for lighthouses.

| Name | Image | Location | Coordinates | Year first lit | Automated | Year deactivated | Current Lens | Focal Height |
|---|---|---|---|---|---|---|---|---|
| Battery Gladden Light | | Mobile Bay | 30.6675°N 88.0228°W | 1872 | Never | 1913 (Destroyed by 1950) | None | 45 ft (14 m) |
| Choctaw Point Light | | Mobile | 30.667°N 87.983°W | 1831 | Never | 1862 (Destroyed) | None | 63 ft (19 m) |
| Middle Bay Light | | Mobile Bay | 30.4372°N 88.0111°W | 1885 | 1935 | Active | 155mm | 48 ft (15 m) |
| Mobile Point Range; Rear Light | | Fort Morgan | 30.2278°N 88.0242°W | 1822 (First); 1873 (Last) | Never | 1966 (Replaced with skeleton tower) | None | 45 ft (14 m) |
| Sand Island Light | | Dauphin Island | 30.1875°N 88.0506°W | 1838 (First); 1873 (Current) | 1948 | 1971 | None | 131 ft (40 m) |
