= Dauphin Island Sea Lab =

Marine education and research center in Alabama, United States

- Interactive map of Dauphin Island Sea Lab
- 30°15′01″N 88°04′43″W
- Date opened: 1971
- Location: Dauphin Island, Alabama, United States
- Website: www.disl.edu

The Dauphin Island Sea Lab (DISL) is Alabama's primary marine education and research center. DISL is the home site of the Marine Environmental Sciences Consortium and was founded by an act of the Alabama State Legislature in 1971. It also has a public aquarium specializing in estuarine organisms, the George F. Crozier Estuarium.

The facilities are located on the East end of Dauphin Island, and occupy grounds formerly owned by the US Air Force for the 693rd Radar Squadron. It is located next to the historic Fort Gaines.

== Alabama Aquarium at the Dauphin Island Sea Lab ==
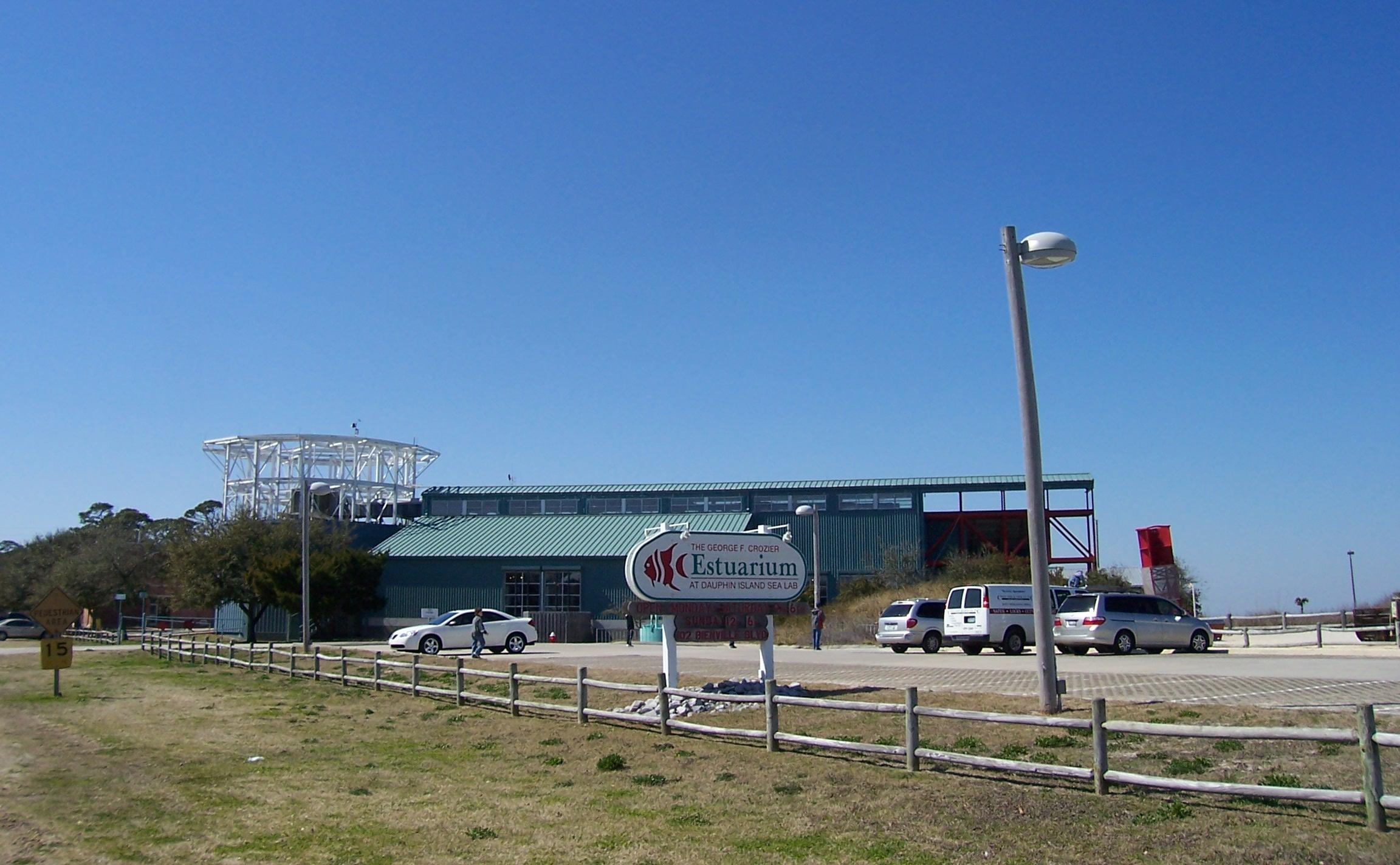
The George F. Crozier Estuarium at Dauphin Island Sea Lab

The George F. Crozier Estuarium is part of the Discovery Hall educational program at the Dauphin Island Sea Lab. It includes a 10,000 square foot Exhibit Hall and a Living Marsh Boardwalk. The Exhibit Hall features four exhibits highlighting aquatic life that could be found in the Mobile-Tensaw River Delta, Mobile Bay, the Barrier Islands and the Northern Gulf of Mexico.

- The Mobile-Tensaw River Delta exhibit recreates Alabama's largest wetland, the Mobile-Tensaw River Delta and features multi-species displays featuring the American alligator, turtles and gar.
- The Mobile Bay exhibit features a replica of the legs of the Middle Bay Lighthouse and houses native species found in the brackish water of Mobile Bay, including stone crabs, horseshoe crabs, blue crabs, oysters, spadefish, and flounder.
- The Barrier Islands exhibit features saltwater species commonly found on and around Alabama's barrier islands, including shrimp, blue crabs and hermit crabs.
- The Northern Gulf of Mexico exhibit includes displays of the different marine communities of the Northern Gulf of Mexico and features octopus, lobsters, eels, seahorses, red snapper, sharks and jellyfish.
- Rays of the Bay is the latest exhibit added to the Estuarium. Opened in March 2013, the 6,400 US gallons (24,000 L) touch tank houses six sets of four species of rays and skates indigenous to the Northern Gulf of Mexico and Mobile Bay. The species include the Southern stingray, Cownose ray and Atlantic stingray.

== Research ==
It was announced in August 2014 that the Dauphin Island Sea Lab would open a new 2,300 square feet (210 m^{2}) research facility in mid-2015 dedicated to studying dolphin, manatee and whale strandings on the Alabama Gulf Coast. The Alabama Marine Mammal Stranding Network (AMMSN) took residence in the new facility on May 22, 2015.

== Gallery ==
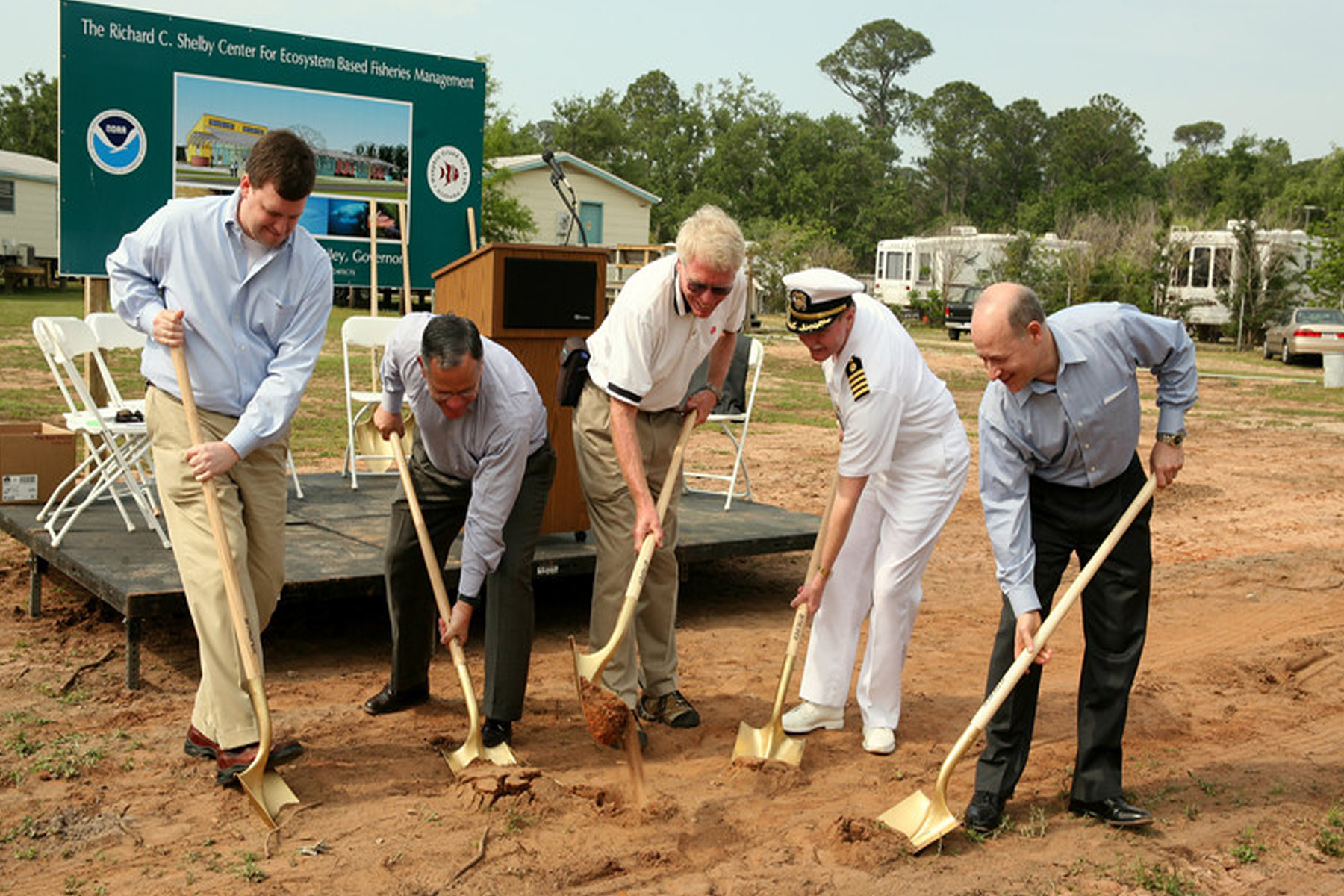
Groundbreaking ceremony for the new Richard C. Shelby Center for Ecosystem Based Fisheries Management lab, 2008

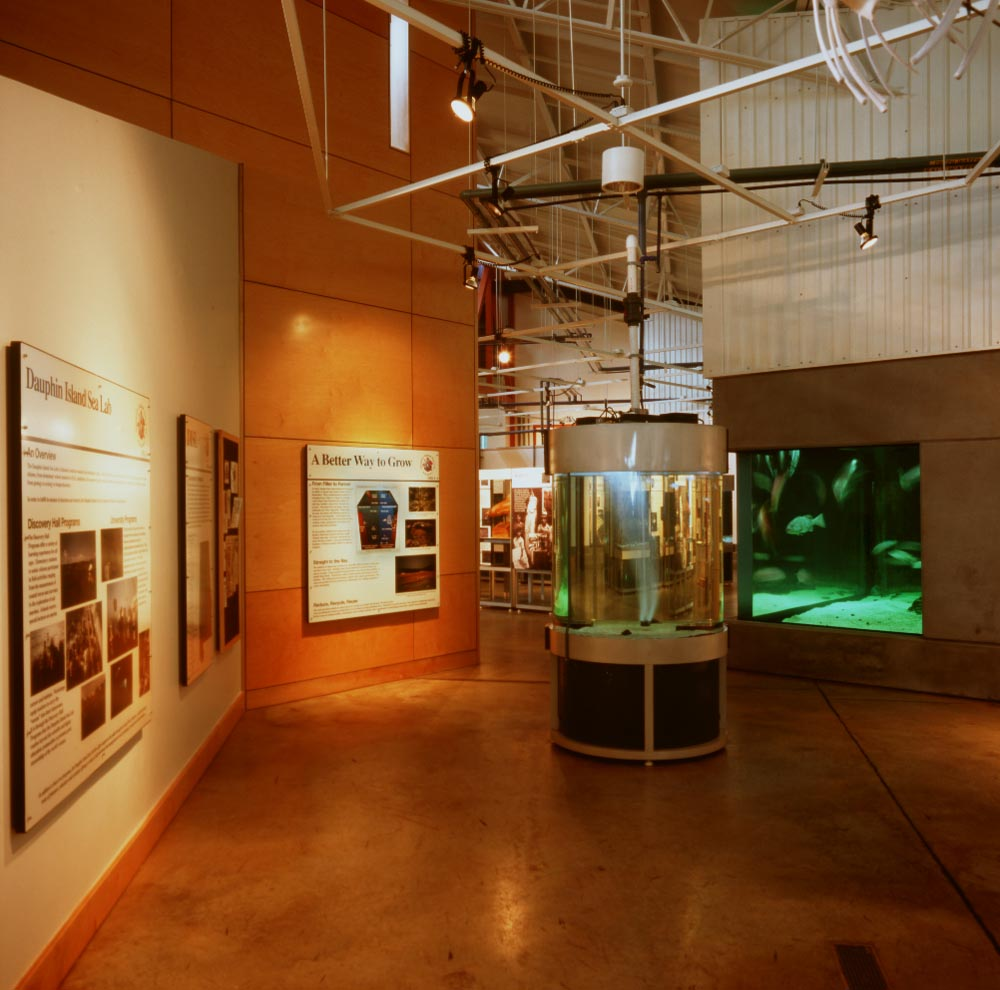
A view inside The Estuarium.

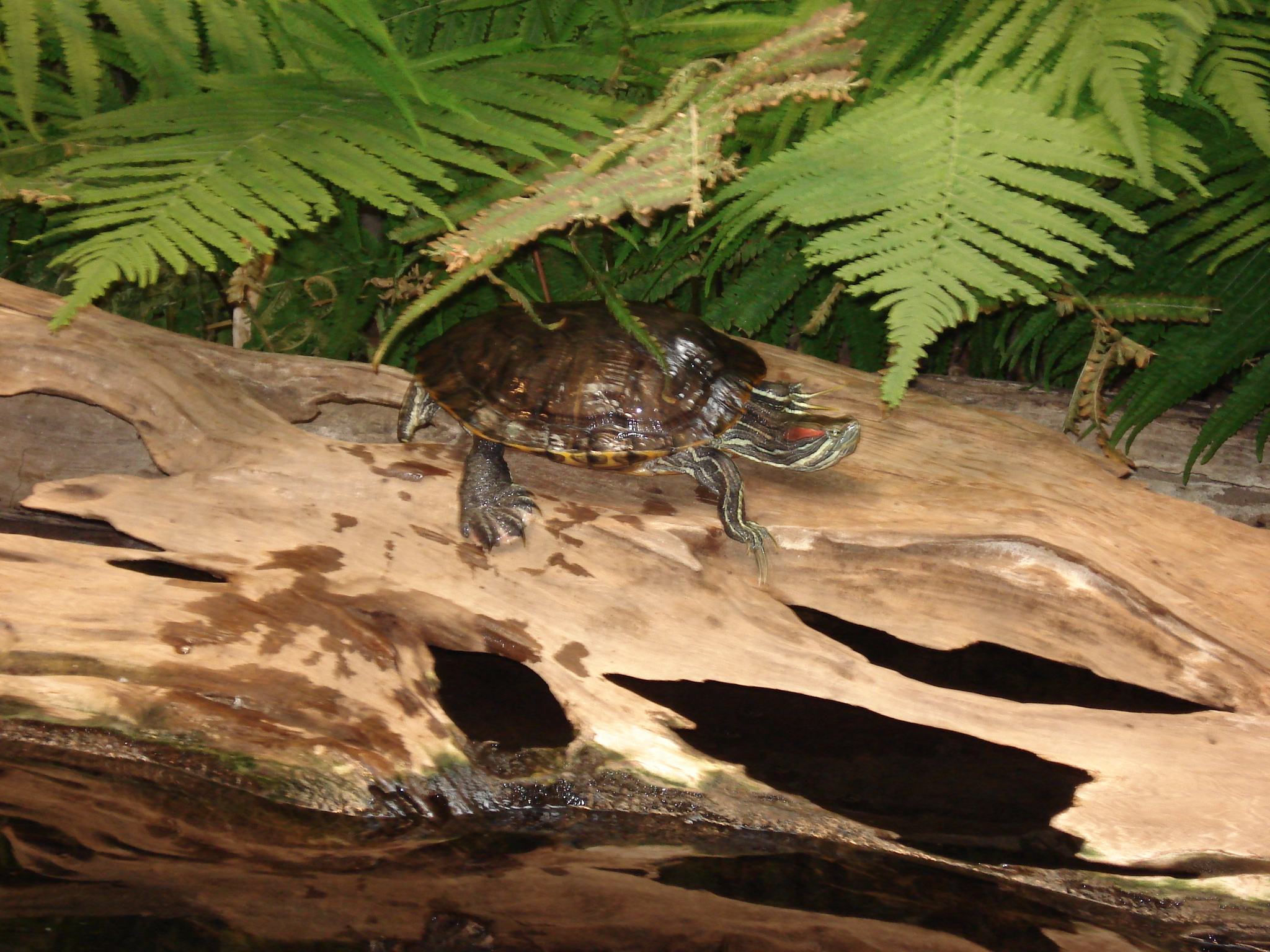
Red-eared slider (Trachemys scripta elegans).

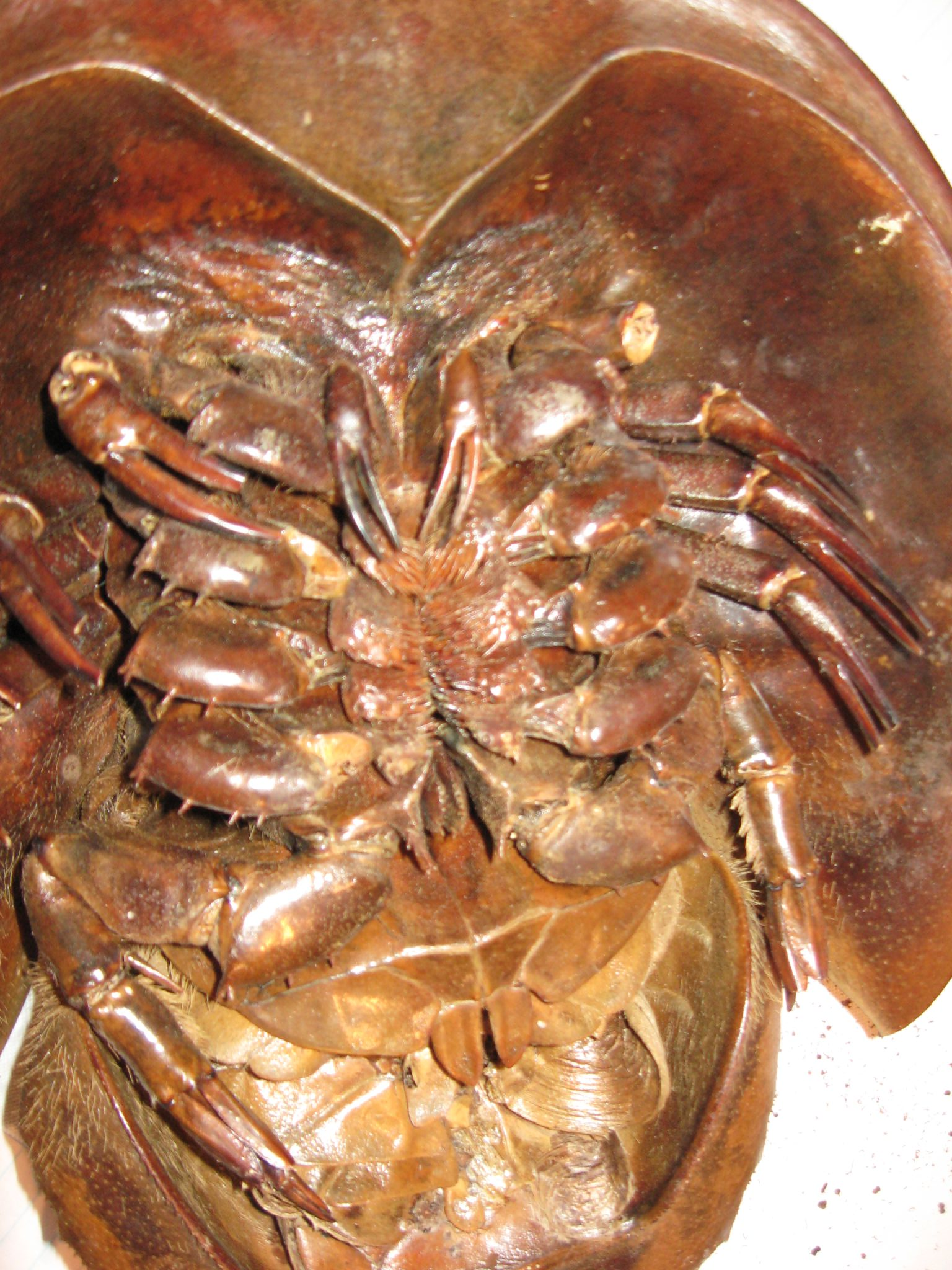
Atlantic horseshoe crab (Limulus polyphemus).

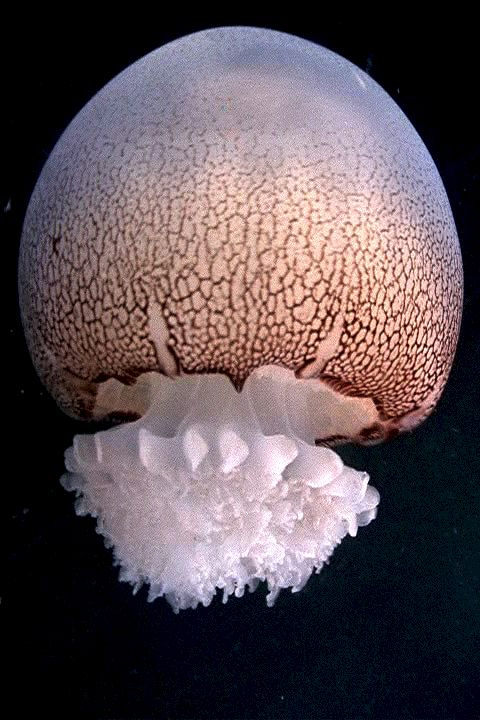
Cannonball jellyfish (Stomolophus meleagris).
