= Pensacola culture =

Archaeological culture in the southeastern US

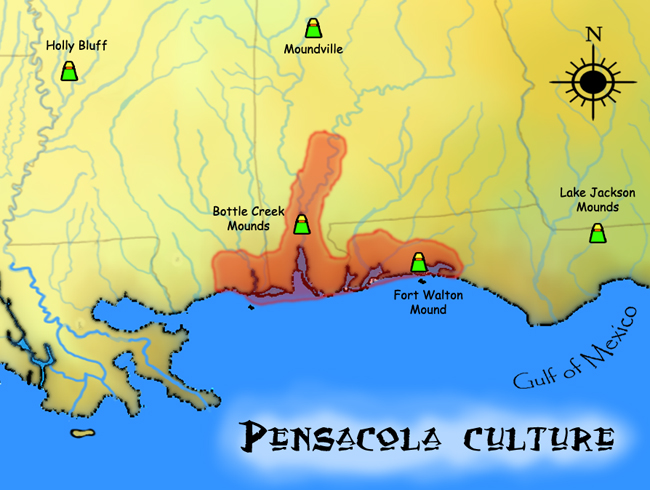
Geographic extent of Pensacola culture and some of its important sites as well as other important contemporaneous sites

The Pensacola culture was a regional variation of the Mississippian culture along the Gulf Coast of the United States that lasted from 1100 to 1700 CE. The archaeological culture covers an area stretching from a transitional Pensacola/Fort Walton culture zone at Choctawhatchee Bay in Florida to the eastern side of the Mississippi River Delta near Biloxi, Mississippi, with the majority of its sites located along Mobile Bay in the Mobile-Tensaw River Delta. Sites for the culture stretched inland, north into the southern Tombigee and Alabama River valleys, as far as the vicinity of Selma, Alabama.

== Definition ==
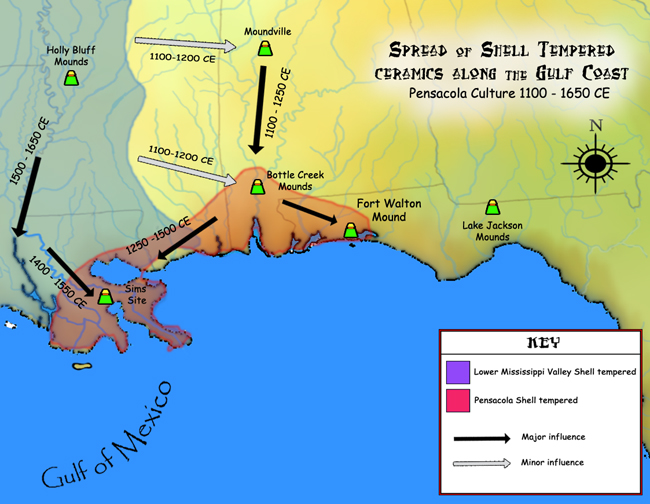
Spread of shell tempered pottery to and from the Pensacola culture area

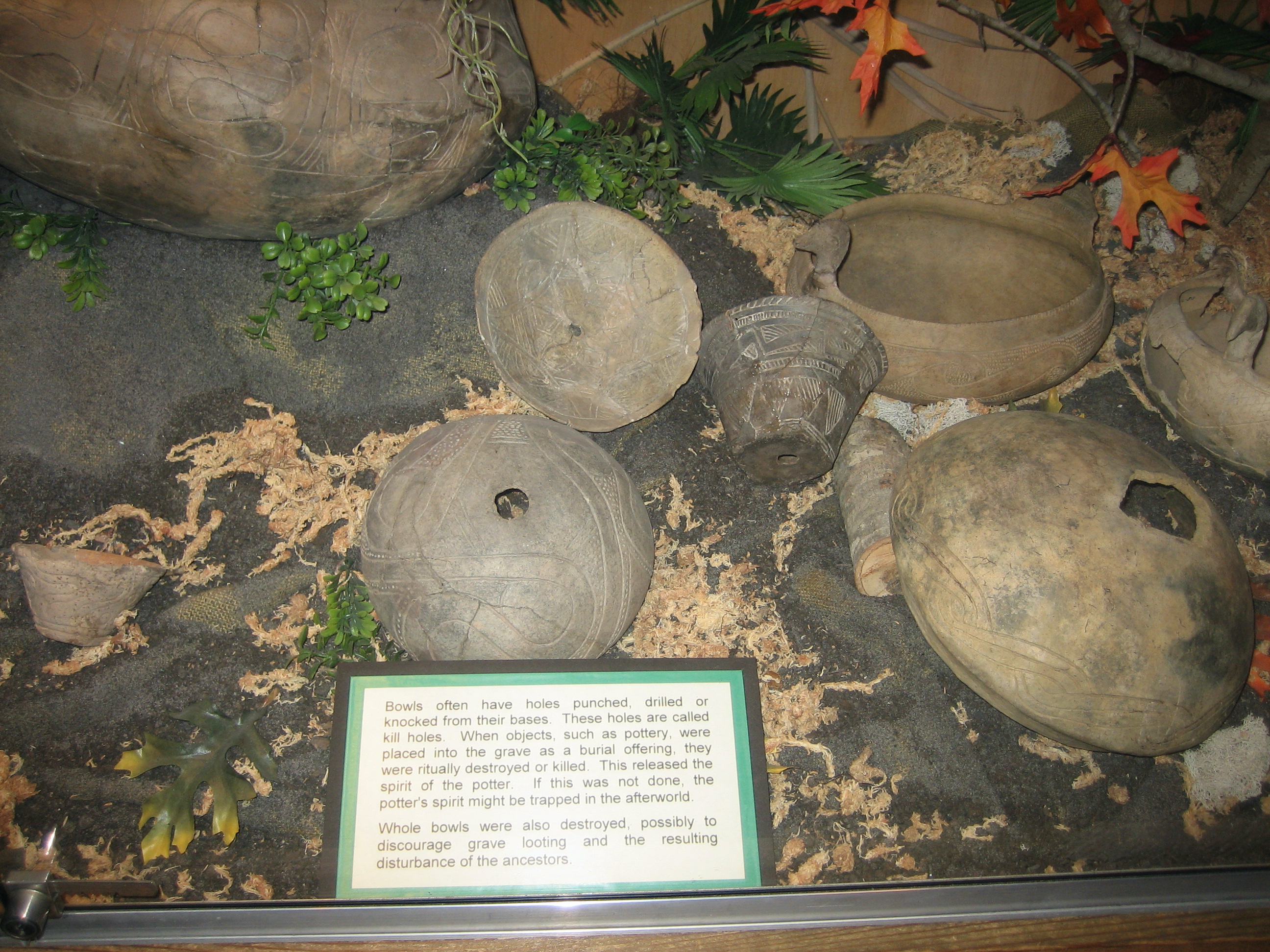
Mississippian culture pottery from the Fort Walton site

Both the Pensacola culture and the nearby Fort Walton culture were a mixture of the Late Woodland period Weeden Island culture that preceded them in the area and an influx of Mississippian culture peoples from further north. Originally Pensacola and Fort Walton had been classified together under the Pensacola name by archaeologists, named for a group of sites located around Pensacola Bay and Choctawhatchee Bay, the approximate geographic center of their combined areas. However further study of their differing ceramic technologies over the years has led archaeologists to reclassify them as two separate cultures. Further archaeological research has also determined that the Bottle Creek site (the largest Pensacola culture site, which is located north of Mobile Bay) was the actual center for the culture and that there are more Pensacola sites in that area and around Perdido Bay than in the Pensacola area.

The peoples of the Early Pensacola culture were closely tied to the people of the Moundville polity located upstream from them and were possibly the result of colonization from the Moundville area. They used the more typical Mississippian culture shell tempering for their pottery. Whereas the Fort Walton peoples, whose largest site was Lake Jackson Mounds in Tallahassee, were more closely tied to and influenced by the Etowah polity of northern Georgia and like them used mostly sand, grit, grog, or combinations of these materials as tempering agents in their pottery. The early ceramics of Pensacola culture also show that they had significant contact with Plaquemine Mississippian culture peoples from the Lower Mississippi Valley. Archaeological research at the Bottle Creek site has shown that the people of the Pensacola culture may have moved into this geographical area from the north and west, but by the fourteenth century they had developed their own distinctive ceramics style and their own unique settlement pattern. Unlike their Fort Walton neighbors to the east, Pensacola peoples relied more on the use of coastal resources than on maize agriculture. The settlement pattern of the Pensacola culture area suggests that the area was a series of minor chiefdoms with their own local centers such as Fort Walton Mound with one large capital located at the Bottle Creek site. The site is the largest on the Gulf Coast and with 18 mounds is comparable in scale to Moundville and the Plaquemine Mississippian Holly Bluff site in western Mississippi. By 1250 CE Pensacola peoples had begun trading with Coastal Coles Creek culture peoples in southeastern Louisiana. Their style of pottery was found to be influential on peoples in this area, with many examples as well as local derivatives found at the Sims site in Saint Charles Parish, Louisiana.

=== Local chronology ===
Period	Culture	Dates	Bottle Creek site phases
(Early) Late Woodland	Weeden Island culture	400 - 750 CE	Tate's Hammock
(Late) Late Woodland	Wakulla culture	750 - 1100 CE	Coden
Early Mississippian	Pensacola culture	1100 - 1250 CE	Andrews Place
Middle Mississippian	Pensacola culture	1250 - 1400 CE	Bottle Creek I
Late Mississippian	Pensacola culture	1400 -1550 CE	Bottle Creek II
Protohistoric	Pensacola culture	1550 - 1700 CE	Bear Point

== Archaeological sites ==
Site	Image	Description
Bottle Creek Indian Mounds	Approach to the Bottle Mounds site	Located on a low swampy island within the Mobile-Tensaw River Delta in Baldwin County, Alabama. The type site for the Pensacola culture, it was occupied between 1250 and 1550 CE, and served as the focal point for interaction with other Mississippian groups along the coast and the interior of the area. It includes 18 platform mounds, the tallest being roughly 45 feet (14 m) high. Five of those eighteen mounds are arranged around the central plaza. It was the largest Mississippian chiefdom on the north-central Gulf Coast.
Butcherpen Mound		Located in Santa Rosa County, Florida, the site is mainly associated with the Weeden Island culture, with carbon dating placing it to roughly 1005 CE, although it does contain some Pensacola era pottery.
Dauphin Island Mound	Dauphin Island Mound	Located on the northern shore of Dauphin Island, Alabama, a barrier island of Mobile County, Alabama. It is a shell midden mound composed of discarded oyster shells. Archaeologists have theorized that the site was a winter migration location for peoples from the Bottle Creek site who came to harvest the rich marine life in Little Dauphin Island Sound.
Fort Walton Mound	Fort Walton Mound	A massive platform mound measuring 12 feet (3.7 m) high and 223 feet (68 m) wide at the base located in Okaloosa County, Florida. It was once the type site for the Fort Walton culture until more thorough investigations placed it with the Pensacola culture.
Hickory Ridge Cemetery Archeological Site		Located in Escambia County, Florida north of Big Lagoon, it was a cemetery associated with a nearby village, 8 ES 1052, that through carbon dating was determined to have been used circa 1450 CE. Analysis of ceramics suggested it was a Late Bottle Creek Phase or Early Bear Point Phase site.
Naval Live Oaks Cemetery		Also known as the Head Site, it was a prehistoric cemetery now located in Santa Rosa County, Florida.

== European contact ==
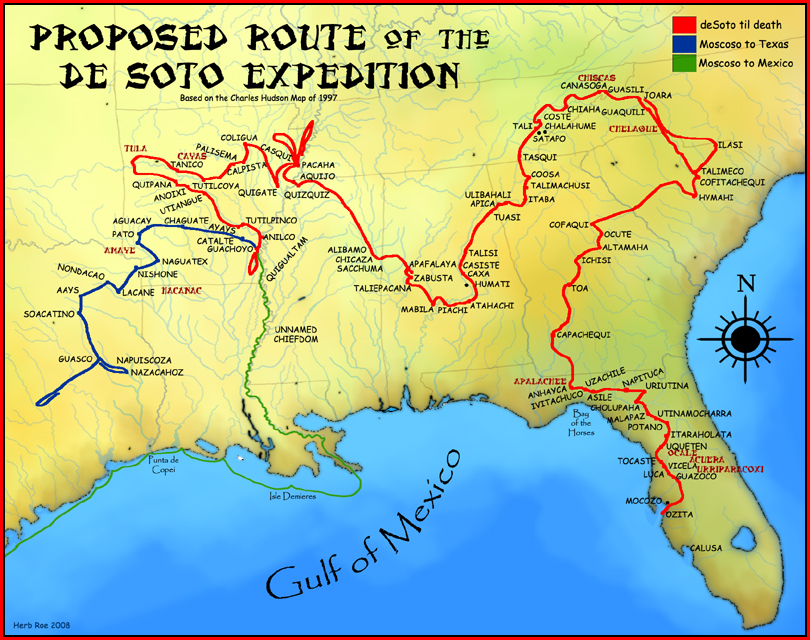
Proposed de Soto Expedition route, based on the 1997 Charles M. Hudson map

Archaeological excavations at the Bottle Creek site have shown that it had continued to be inhabited during the time of European contact from the sixteenth to the early eighteenth century, although it is still uncertain which historic groups these people may be. The Pensacola culture peoples first contact with Europeans may have been with the Narváez expedition in 1528. Cabeza de Vaca reported that the Native Americans they encountered in the vicinity of what is now Pensacola Bay were of "large stature and well formed," and lived in permanent houses. The chief wore a robe of what de Vaca called "civet-marten", "the best [skins], I think, that can be found." After initially appearing to be friendly, they attacked the Spaniards without warning during the night.

In 1539 Diego Maldonado, exploring the northern coast of the Gulf of Mexico under orders from Hernando de Soto, found Pensacola Bay (which the Spanish called the Bay of Achuse, Achusi, Ochuse or Ochus). Maldonado found a village on the bay, where he seized one or two of the inhabitants, along with a "good blanket of sables." De Soto ordered Maldonado to meet him at the Bay of Achuse the next summer with supplies for his expedition. Maldonado returned three years in succession, but de Soto never appeared. It is possible that the Pensacola culture peoples were connected to or were the central Alabama Mabilians disastrously encountered by de Soto in 1540. The next mention of the Mabilians is in 1674 by Bishop Gabriel Diaz Vara Calderon, who places them on an island in west Florida, possibly the swampy high ground of Mound Island where the Bottle Creek site is located or Dauphin Island. Later historic Mabilian villages are closer geographically to Bottle Creek and the nearby city of Mobile, Alabama was named for them.

In 1559 Tristán de Luna y Arellano led a Spanish expedition to establish the colony of Ochuse on Pensacola Bay, then known as the Bay of Ichuse (also spelled Ychuse), but the endeavor ended up being short-lived. The Spanish had planned to rely on the local peoples for food supplies, but they found the area almost deserted and only a few people living in fishing camps around the bay.

By the early eighteenth century the Pensacola people, a Muskogean speaking group associated with the Fort Walton culture Apalachee Province, were living in the western part of what is now the Florida Panhandle and are the source of the name for Pensacola Bay, the city of Pensacola and later the Pensacola culture. They inhabited the area until the mid-eighteenth century, but by 1764 they had been assimilated into various Choctaw or Creek bands that had moved into the area or westward with the Biloxi to merge with the Tunica as part of the Tunica-Biloxi.

== See also ==
- List of Mississippian sites
