= Fort Gaines =

Fort Gaines may refer to:

- Fort Gaines, Georgia, a city located in Clay County, Georgia
- Fort Gaines (Alabama), a fort on Dauphin Island
- Fort Gaines, Maryland, an American Civil War-era fort that defended the northeastern approaches to Washington, D.C.
