= Indian Mound Park (Dauphin Island, Alabama) =

Archaeological site in Alabama, United States

- U.S. National Register of Historic Places
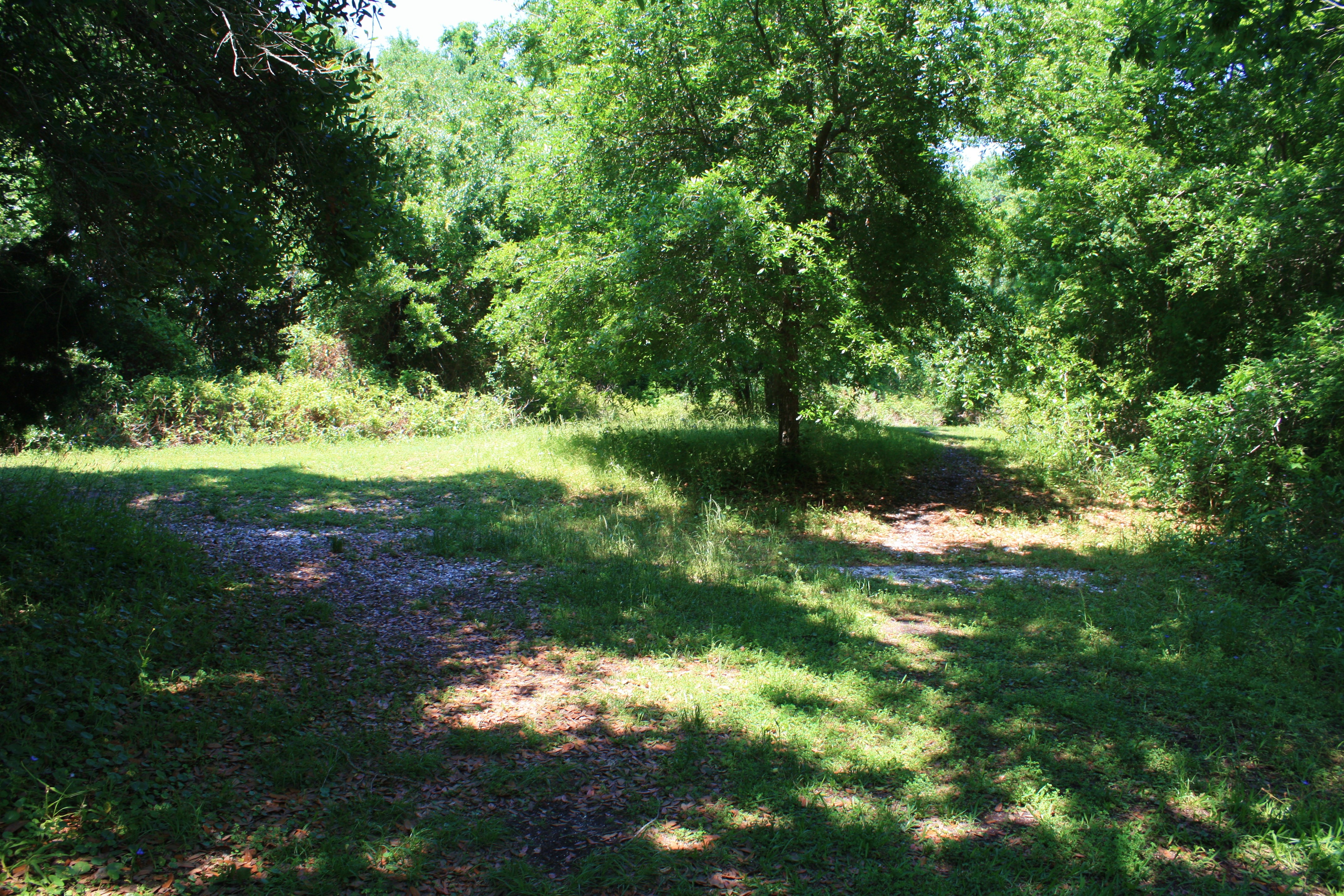
- Shell middens at the site in 2010
- Interactive map of Indian Mound Park
- Nearest city: Dauphin Island, Alabama
- Coordinates: 30°15′24″N 88°06′25″W
- Area: 18 acres (7.3 ha)
- NRHP reference No.: 73000360
- Added to NRHP: August 14, 1973

Indian Mound Park, also known as Shell Mound Park or Indian Shell Mound Park, is a park and bird refuge located on the northern shore of Dauphin Island, a barrier island of Mobile County, Alabama, United States. In addition to the many birds which visit, a wide variety of botanical species contribute to the natural offerings. The site is historically significant due to the presence of prehistoric Indian shell middens, mounds composed of discarded oyster shells. The park was added to the National Register of Historic Places on August 14, 1973. It is administered by the Alabama Department of Conservation and Natural Resources.

== History ==
The shell middens located at Indian Mound Park date to the Mississippian period (1100 to 1550). The mounds were visited throughout this period by Native Americans of the Pensacola culture, who harvested oysters and fished in Little Dauphin Island Sound, an inlet of the Gulf of Mexico. Archaeologist Gregory Waselkov of the University of South Alabama believes that the visitors to the island came from Bottle Creek, the largest Mississippian settlement in the area. Waselkov theorizes that Bottle Creek, located on the Mobile-Tensaw Delta, served as the major village while Dauphin Island acted as a migration destination during the winter months.

Relatively immune from the unpredictable weather conditions that affect farming, the fish and oysters from the sound were a reliable supply of food that could be immediately consumed or dried for use during later months. The oysters were collected from reefs during low tide conditions. Placed atop heated coals in a pit, the oysters were steamed by covering with seaweed. The cooking technique likely resembled a traditional New England clam bake. The steaming process would also have facilitated easy recovery of the oyster meat since the shells open naturally when heated. For preservation of the oysters, the recovered meat would be treated by smoking. Over the years, the discarded shells accumulated to form the middens. Spaniards first visited Dauphin Island in 1519. The arrival of Europeans to the region led to the disruption of the Mississippian culture. The Mississippian tribes in the coastal region were replaced by or became the Choctaw and Creek tribes. The Creeks and Seminoles continued to fish and harvest oysters in the area until the 1830s when they were forcibly displaced to the Indian Territory in present-day Oklahoma.

In 1699, Pierre Le Moyne d'Iberville landed on the island and discovered a large pile of human bones. Based on the discovery, d'Iberville coined the name Massacre Island. The height and serpentine shape of the shell mounds on the north side of the island indicated use or habitation by earlier civilizations.

== Archaeology ==
Indian Mound Park contains six oyster shell middens of varying sizes. The largest is approximately circular with a recessed bowl in the center of the mound. This midden measures 180 by 165 feet (55 by 50 m) with a height of 3 to 22 feet (0.91 to 6.71 m). In the book Stars Fell On Alabama, however, Carl Carmer states that the largest mound rose to a height of 50 feet (15 m) and was composed of layers measuring ten feet (3.0 m) thick. The structures are archaeologically similar to shell rings found on the coasts of Florida and South Carolina.

In 1940 and 1941, a limited archaeological survey was executed on a large prehistoric shell midden on Dauphin Island. More extensive excavations of the site were conducted by archaeologists from the University of South Alabama in 1990. Observation of the mound profile revealed stratification with large layers of oyster shells and thin intervening layers of charcoal, fish bones, and potsherds. The stratified layers are due to the seasonal use of the mounds by various bands of people over a period of centuries. The oyster shells were discarded into the area surrounding the fire used for steaming. As the location of the fire moved each year, a complex pattern of overlapping layers emerged in the form of shell mounds. Sponsored by the National Science Foundation, a mapping team from the University of South Alabama produced a contour map of the shell mounds.

Few artifacts were recovered from the site during the excavations. Objects discovered at the location were primarily broken cooking pots. Stone tools were particularly scarce in the region.

== Wildlife ==
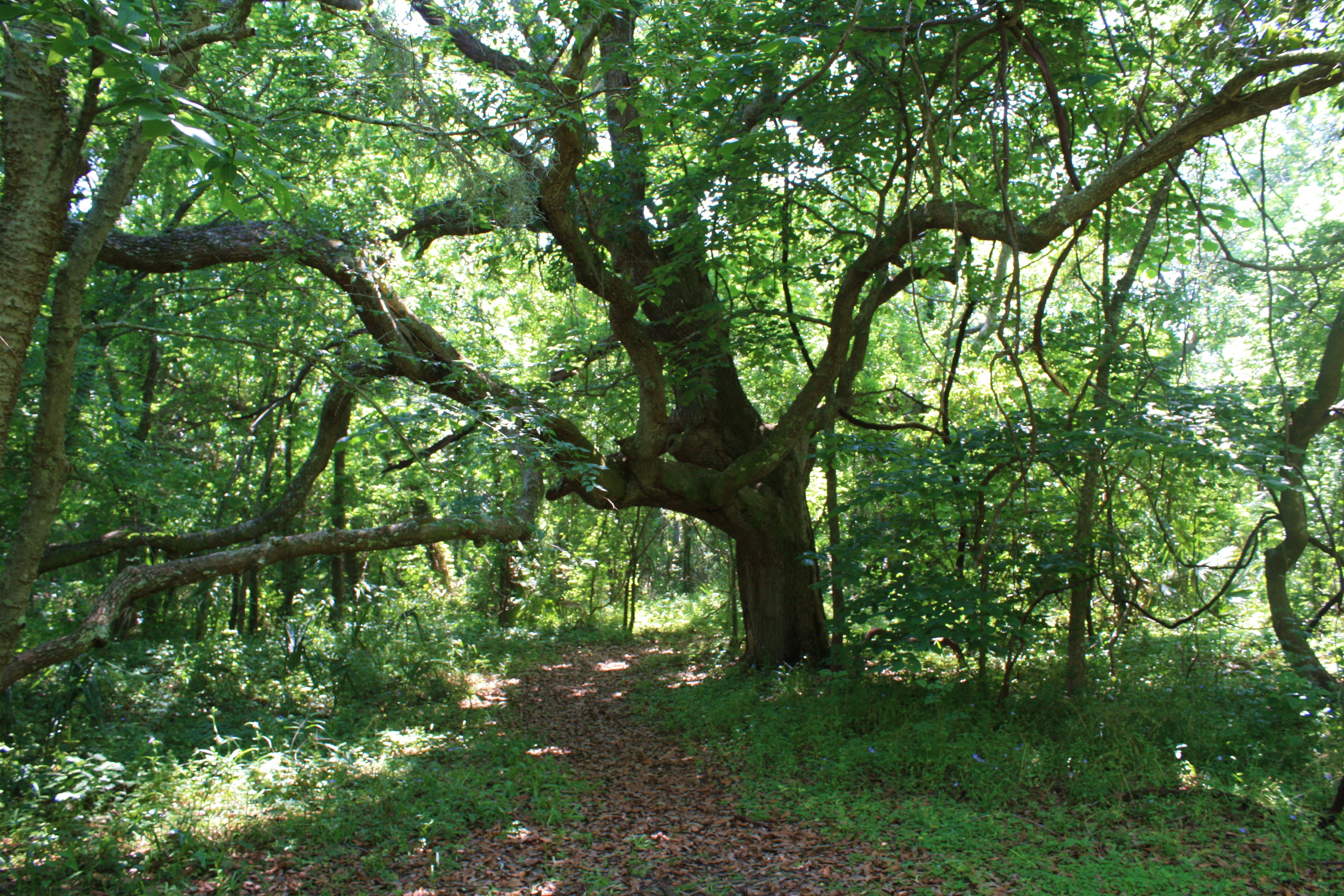
Live oak in the park

Indian Mound Park exhibits a variety of subtropical plants exceeding that of the other Gulf Coast barrier islands. Likely brought to the area by Native American groups for medicine or culinary purposes, the species include representatives of families from as far inland as the Appalachian Mountains and as far south as the state of Yucatán in Mexico. Live oaks on the island may be over 800 years old. They were present at the first visits of Spanish and French explorers.

The park is located on the Dauphin Island-Bayou La Batre Loop of the Alabama Coastal Birding Trail. Due to its location on the northern boundary of the Gulf of Mexico, Dauphin Island is a stop for many migrant birds. Up to 384 species of birds have been spotted on the island, including a large variety of shorebirds, long-legged waders, and warblers. The city of Dauphin Island was named America's "birdiest" small coastal city in both 2005 and 2006. Additionally, migratory butterflies can be spotted at Indian Mound Park.

== See also ==
- Emeryville Shellmound
- Fig Island
- Green Mound
- La Jolla complex
- Madira Bickel Mound State Archeological Site
- Mound Key Archeological State Park
- Whaleback Shell Midden
