= Jeremiah Denton Airport =

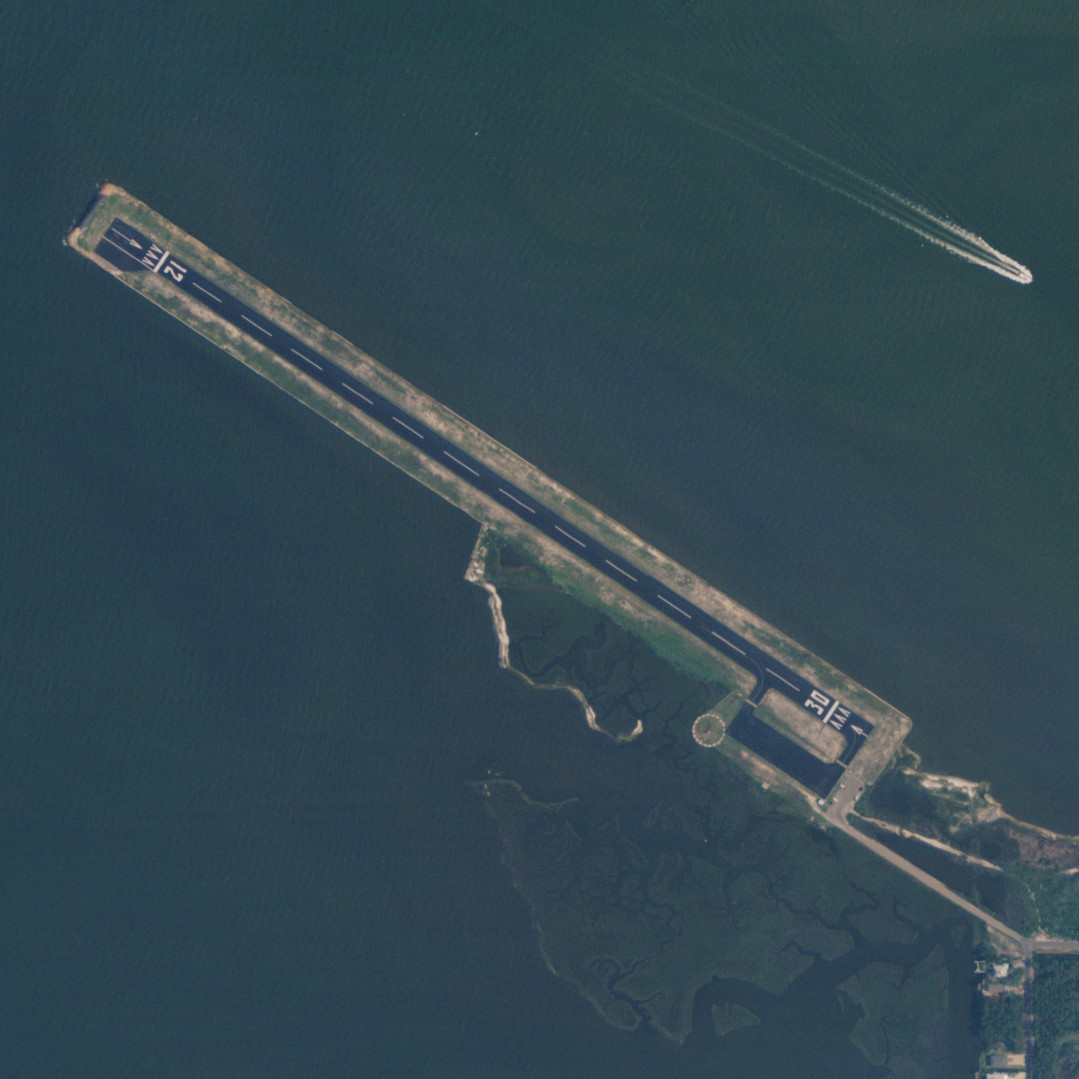
- NAIP aerial image, 23 June 2006
- IATA: none; ICAO: none; FAA LID: 4R9

Summary
- Airport type: Public
- Owner: Mobile County
- Serves: Dauphin Island, Alabama
- Elevation AMSL: 5 ft (1.5 m)
- Coordinates: 30°15′38″N 088°07′39″W
- Interactive map of Jeremiah Denton Airport

Runways
Direction	Length		Surface
Direction	ft	m	Surface
12/30	3,000	914	Asphalt

Statistics (2017)
- Aircraft operations (2015): 3,650
- Based aircraft: 0
- Source: Federal Aviation Administration

Jeremiah Denton Airport (FAA LID: 4R9), formerly Dauphin Island Airport, is a county-owned public-use airport in Mobile County, Alabama, United States. It is just northwest of the central business district of Dauphin Island, a town located on a barrier island. The airport is on Mobile Bay, west of the Aloe Bay Channel.

This airport is included in the FAA's National Plan of Integrated Airport Systems for 2011–2015 and 2009–2013, both of which categorized it as a general aviation facility. In 2017 the airfield was closed for a time to test Navy drone operations.

== Facilities and aircraft ==
Jeremiah Denton Airport covers an area of 22 acres (9 ha) at an elevation of 5 feet (2 m) above mean sea level. It has one runway designated 12/30 with an asphalt surface measuring 3,000 by 80 feet (914 x 24 m). For the 12-month period ending May 18, 2010, the airport had 3,650 general aviation aircraft operations, an average of 10 per day.

== See also ==
- List of airports in Alabama
