= Hickory Ridge Cemetery Archeological Site =

Historic site in Escambia County, Florida

- U.S. National Register of Historic Places
- Location within Florida Location within the United States
- Location: Pensacola, Florida
- Coordinates: 30.35°N 87.37°W
- NRHP reference No.: 00001131
- Added to NRHP: September 22, 2000

The Hickory Ridge Cemetery Archeological Site (8ES1280) is an archaeological site in Pensacola, Escambia County Florida. It is located north of Big Lagoon and west of Pensacola. During excavations in the 1980s carbon dating was done on burnt wood fragments associated with burials in the mound, with a determination that the site had been used c. 1450. Analysis of ceramics suggested it was a Mississippian culture site, probably from the Late Bottle Creek Phase or Early Bear Point Phases of the Pensacola culture. It was a cemetery associated with a village nearby, (8ES1052). On September 22, 2000, it was added to the U.S. National Register of Historic Places.
