= Dauphin Island Audubon Bird Sanctuary =

Bird sanctuary in Alabama, United States

Audubon Bird Sanctuary
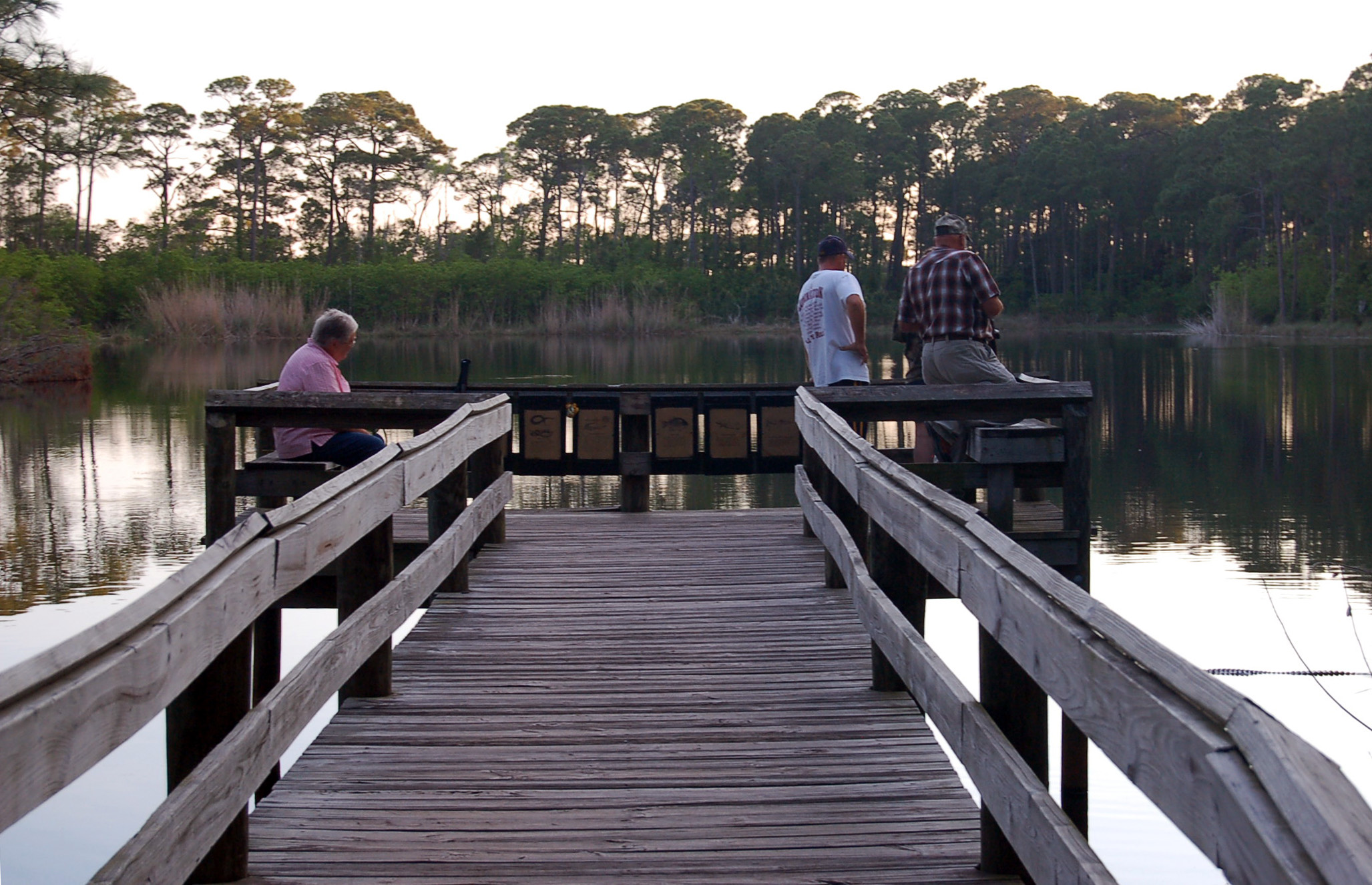
- Dock on Alligator Lake within the sanctuary

- Location within Alabama Location within the United States
- Location: Dauphin Island, Alabama
- Coordinates: 30.251°N 88.087°W
- Area: 66.3684 ha (164.000 acres)
- Designation: National Recreation Trail (trail system)
- Operator: Dauphin Island Park and Beach Board

The Audubon Bird Sanctuary is a bird sanctuary on the eastern side of Dauphin Island, Alabama, measuring 164 acres (66 ha). The island is an important stop for many bird migrations, as it is often the first land birds encounter when crossing the Gulf of Mexico. The island was dedicated as an Important Bird Area due to this fact.

The sanctuary itself, created in 1961, features a wide variety of landforms, including a freshwater lake, swamp, pine forest, and dunes. The trail system, spanning three miles, was designated as a National Recreation Trail in 2012.

== Background ==
Dauphin Island is a designated Important Bird Area and is a rest stop for birds on their way north for migration, as it is often the first land available after they cross the Gulf of Mexico. 420 of Alabama's 445 officially documented bird species have been spotted on the island.

The island is an important winter habitat for the endangered piping plover. Other sandpipers, plovers, and turnstones also frequent the island. In the spring, marbled godwit and red knot are common on the island. Long-legged waders like herons are common on the island's brackish wetlands, while the forested areas are more commonly home to migratory birds. Autumn sees a rise in warblers and wrens in vegetated areas.

== History ==
When the island was given to the Dauphin Island Park and Beach Board from the Alabama Department of Conservation and Natural Resources, it was decided that an island refuge was necessary to protect the large numbers of migrating birds and butterflies on their twice-annual migrations. 1961 was the official year of foundation, listed by the National Oceanic and Atmospheric Administration. In 1967, an official agreement with the National Audubon Society so it was an official part of the national system of Audubon wildlife sanctuaries. The trail system was designated as a National Recreation Trail in 2012.
