= Mobile Point Range Lights =

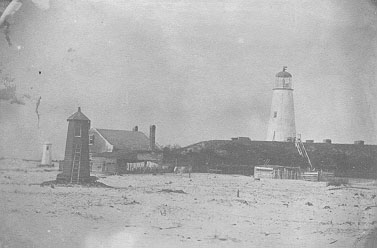
- The 1822 lighthouse and range lights prior to the Civil War.
- Location: Baldwin County, near Mobile, Alabama
- Coordinates: 30.2278°N 88.0239°W

Tower
- Constructed: 1822
- Foundation: concrete
- Construction: iron
- Height: 49 feet (15 m)
- Shape: skeletal

Light
- First lit: September 29, 1822
- Deactivated: 1966
- Lens: Fourth order, Fresnel 1858
- Characteristic: fixed red light

The Mobile Point Range Lights were a series of lighthouses at the entrance to Mobile Bay, at Mobile Point on the tip of the Fort Morgan peninsula, near Mobile, Alabama, United States. The first lighthouse was built as a landfall light by June 1822 at a cost of $9,995. The lighthouse was a conical brick masonry tower, 40 feet (12 m) tall. It was first lit on 29 September 1822. Fort Morgan was built adjacent to the lighthouse in 1833. The lighthouse was joined by the 200-foot (61 m) Sand Island Light across the mouth of the bay, about 3 miles (4.8 km) away in 1858. This resulted in the Mobile Point Lighthouse being downgraded to a harbor light, at the same time a fourth order Fresnel lens was installed. A period photograph (see infobox), taken prior to the American Civil War, shows two shorter masonry towers standing on the beach below the main tower, they served as range lights. The lighthouse was subsequently destroyed by cannonball fire in the Battle of Mobile Bay during the Civil War.

After the war, a temporary wooden tower was built and the Fresnel lens, having survived the destruction of the old tower, was transferred to this structure. A 30-foot (9.1 m) iron lattice-work tower was built, along with a new light keepers house, in 1872 as a replacement and the Fresnel lens was transferred to it. It was lit on 15 February 1872. The lighthouse was deactivated in 1966 and the lens was put on display in the Fort Morgan Museum. A radio style skeletal tower was built to replace the original structure. The new tower stands 120 feet (37 m) tall. The 1873 tower was dismantled in 1979 and later partially restored near the entrance to the Fort Morgan museum. In 2003 the Alabama Historical Commission had the lighthouse dismantled, transported and stored under contract with Robinson Iron Works, a company located in Alabama that specializes in cast iron restoration. As of August 2007, no restoration had been undertaken or funded by the Alabama Historical Commission or any state body. It is currently in storage at Robinson Iron Works awaiting restoration funding.

== See also ==
- Sand Island Light (Alabama)
- Middle Bay Light
