= Sand Island Light (Alabama) =

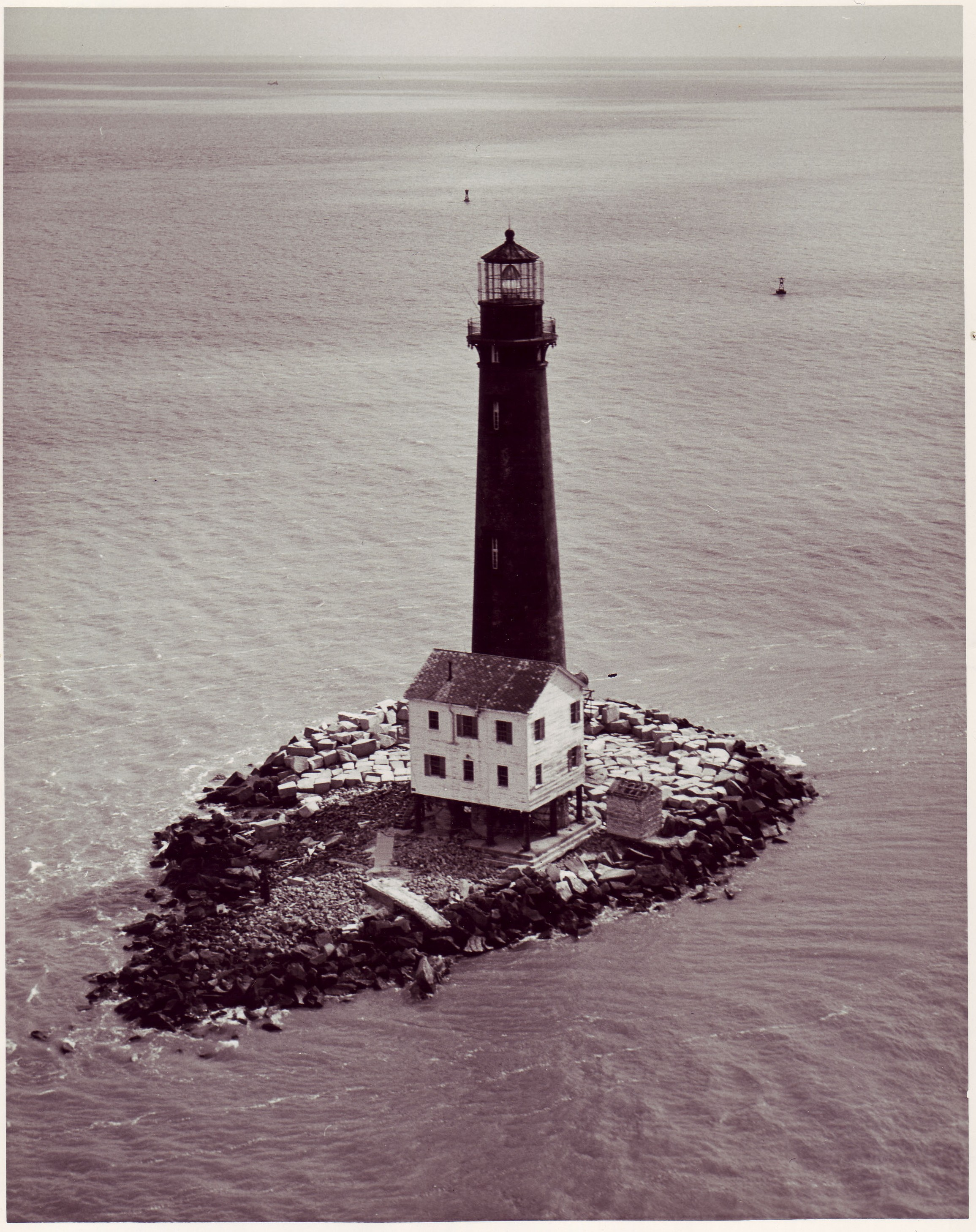
- Sand Island lighthouse - 1962
- Location: Sand Island, Alabama, United States
- Coordinates: 30°11′16″N 88°03′02″W

Tower
- Constructed: 1838 (first); 1859 (second); 1864 (third)
- Foundation: stone
- Construction: brownstone tower
- Automated: 1948
- Height: 131 feet (40 m)
- Shape: tapered cylindrical tower with balcony and lantern
- Markings: unpainted tower, black lantern, and balcony
- Operator: Town of Dauphin Island
- Heritage: National Register of Historic Places listed place
- Fog signal: bell struck every 20 seconds

Light
- First lit: 1873 (current)
- Deactivated: 1971
- Focal height: 38 m (125 ft)
- Lens: 1838: 14 lamps with 16-inch reflectors 1859: First order Fresnel lens 1862-63: Fourth order Fresnel lens 1873: Second order Fresnel lens, now at the Fort Morgan Museum
- Range: 0 miles (0 km)
- Characteristic: F W
- Sand Island Light
- U.S. National Register of Historic Places
- Nearest city: Fort Morgan, Alabama
- Area: less than one acre
- Architectural style: Italianate
- NRHP reference No.: 75000305
- Added to NRHP: November 12, 1975

Sand Island Light, also known as Sand Island Lighthouse (and historical light station), is a decommissioned lighthouse located at the southernmost point of the state of Alabama, United States, near Dauphin Island, at the mouth of Mobile Bay. It is located roughly 3 mi (4.8 km) offshore from the primary Mobile Bay entrance, bounded on the east by Mobile Point and on the west by Dauphin Island. The lighthouse is 132 feet (40 m) high.

== History ==
The first lighthouse on Sand Island, constructed by Winslow Lewis in 1837, was a 55-foot (17 m) structure completed in 1839. The lighting was provided by 14 lamps in 16-inch reflectors and a first-order lens, known as the Lewis lamp, which was a poorly designed version, or Argand-style lamp. Lewis enjoyed a monopoly through his relationship with Stephen Pleasonton that lasted until 1853.

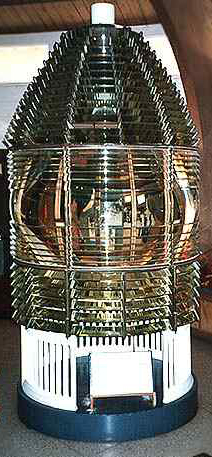
The light of the lighthouse

In 1859 a new lighthouse was completed but was destroyed during the Civil War, on February 23, 1863, by Confederate John W. Glenn. After the Confederates at Fort Morgan observed U.S. Army soldiers in the lighthouse reconnoitering the fort, the guns of the fort fired upon the island, destroying the lighthouse. In 1864 a 48-foot (15 m) wooden tower was built that lasted until 1873.

=== Construction ===
By September 1864, the current lighthouse was completed, which included a two-story Lighthouse keepers dwelling, and the land at the time was approximately 400 acres (160 ha). The base is 28 feet (8.5 m) in diameter and 6 feet (1.8 m) thick, constructed on 171 interconnected wood pilings covered with 12 feet (3.7 m) of concrete, and with a 125-foot (38 m) focal height.

== Issues ==
Sand Island faced continuous erosion to the point where granite blocks were being added to the island to try and stave off the deterioration and loss of the lighthouse. Restoration efforts primarily stabilized the island through 2008. Sand Island Lighthouse's dire situation is similar to its "sister light", the Morris Island Lighthouse, near Charleston, South Carolina. Both lighthouses were on eroded sandy islands, leaving the towers surrounded by water.

== Recent ==
In December 2011, the construction of a new island was completed. 1,400,000 yards (1,300,000 m) of sand was dredged from the sea floor and deposited around the lighthouse creating a 2,600-foot (790 m) by 500-foot (150 m), or approximately 15-acre (6.1 ha), island. Less than a year later the $6,000,000 restoration of the island was washed away by Hurricane Isaac.

The Dauphin Island Foundation (founded in 1991) works with the Alabama Lighthouse Association and acts as an agent and administrator for the Sand Island Restoration Project. There are seven general directors, nine directors at large, and also includes as directors:

- Mayor, Town of Dauphin Island
- President, Dauphin Island Property Owners Association
- President, Dauphin Island, Alabama Chamber of Commerce
- President, Dauphin Island Water and Sewer Authority
- President, Dauphin Island Park & Beach Board

The Sand Island Lighthouse is on the Lighthouse Digest Doomsday List, as one of the most endangered lighthouses in the country, It, and the Mobile Bay lighthouse, was damaged by Hurricane Ivan in 2004 and Hurricane Katrina in 2005.

The image of this lighthouse was used as a stamp cancellation.

== See also ==
- List of lighthouses in the United States
- Mobile Point Range Lights
- Middle Bay Light
