= Battery Gladden Light =

- Location: Mobile Bay
- Coordinates: 30°40′3″N 88°1′22″W

Tower
- Foundation: iron screw-pile
- Construction: wood frame
- Shape: square house with lantern on roof

Light
- First lit: 1872
- Deactivated: 1913
- Focal height: 45 feet (14 m)
- Lens: lens lantern

The Battery Gladden Light was a lighthouse in Mobile Bay which marked a turn in the old ship channel. It was deactivated in 1913 and no longer exists.

== History ==
Battery Gladden was constructed on an artificial island as part of the defenses set up in the Civil War. Dredging operations after the war established a ship channel which ran towards the light and turned to the west just south of the island. In order to direct ships through the channel a square screw-pile house was built in 1872 on the old fortification and equipped with a fourth order Fresnel lens. Channel dredging continued and a new channel was dug to the west, bypassing the portion marked by this light, which was extinguished in 1913. The house remained standing as a daymark, finally succumbing to the elements around 1950.
