= Dauphin Island, Alabama =

Town in the United States

Dauphin Island, Alabama Île du Dauphine
- Town
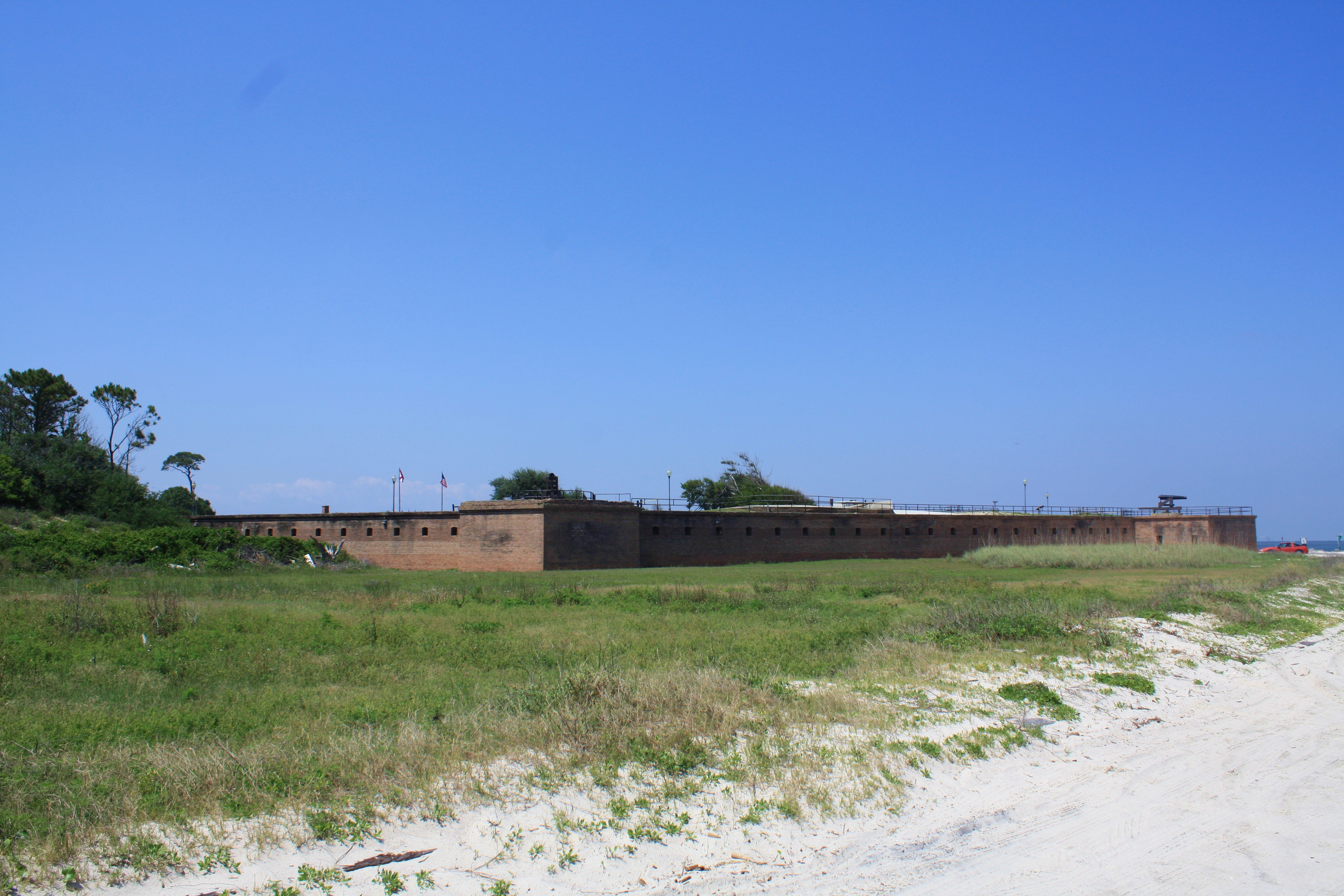
- Fort Gaines and seashore vegetation on the eastern end of Dauphin Island

- Flag Logo
- Motto: "Sunset Capital of Alabama"
- Location in Mobile County, Alabama
- Coordinates: 30°15′23″N 88°12′41″W
- Country: United States
- State: Alabama
- County: Mobile
- Named for: King Louis XV

Area
  - Total: 165.95 sq mi (429.81 km^{2})
  - Land: 6.25 sq mi (16.20 km^{2})
  - Water: 159.70 sq mi (413.61 km^{2})
- Elevation: 0 ft (0 m)

Population (2020)
  - Total: 1,778
  - Density: 284.2/sq mi (109.72/km^{2})
- Time zone: UTC−6 (Central Standard Time (CST))
  - Summer (DST): UTC−5 (Central Daylight Time (CDT))
- ZIP code: 36528
- Area code: 251
- FIPS code: 01-19744
- GNIS feature ID: 2406357
- Website: www.townofdauphinisland.org

Dauphin Island (French: Île du Dauphine), is an island town in Mobile County, Alabama, United States, on a barrier island of the same name in the Gulf of Mexico. It was incorporated in 1988. The population was 1,778 at the 2020 census, up from 1,238 at the 2010 census. The town is part of the Mobile metropolitan area. The island (originally named Massacre Island) was renamed for the king Louis XIV's great-grandson and heir, the dauphin, the future king Louis XV. The name of the island is often mistaken as Dolphin Island; the word dauphin is French for 'dolphin', but historically the term was used as the title of the heir apparent to the French monarch.

The island is one of the Mississippi–Alabama barrier islands, with the Gulf of Mexico to the south, and the Mississippi Sound and Mobile Bay to the north. The island's eastern end helps define the mouth of Mobile Bay. The eastern, wider portion of the island is shaded by thick stands of pine trees and saw palmettos, but the narrow, western part of the island features scrub growth and few trees.

Dauphin Island is home to Fort Gaines, Dauphin Island Sea Lab, the Alabama Aquarium, the Jeremiah Denton Airport, boat ramps, a large public pier that sits on dry land, historic sites, several restaurants, new condominium developments, and numerous private homes. Beaches attract tourism, and fishing is a popular activity in the waters around the island. The island is connected to the mainland by the Gordon Persons Bridge.

Although the island has several bird sanctuaries, the main one is the 164-acre (66 ha) Audubon Bird Sanctuary. Because Dauphin Island is the first land encountered by many birds as they migrate north from South America, many species can be found resting there before continuing their journey.

== History ==
Serpentine shell middens, perhaps 1,500 years old, attest to at least seasonal occupation by the American Indian Mississippian Mound Builder culture. Shell Mound Park, along the island's northern shore, is administered by the Alabama Marine Resources Division.

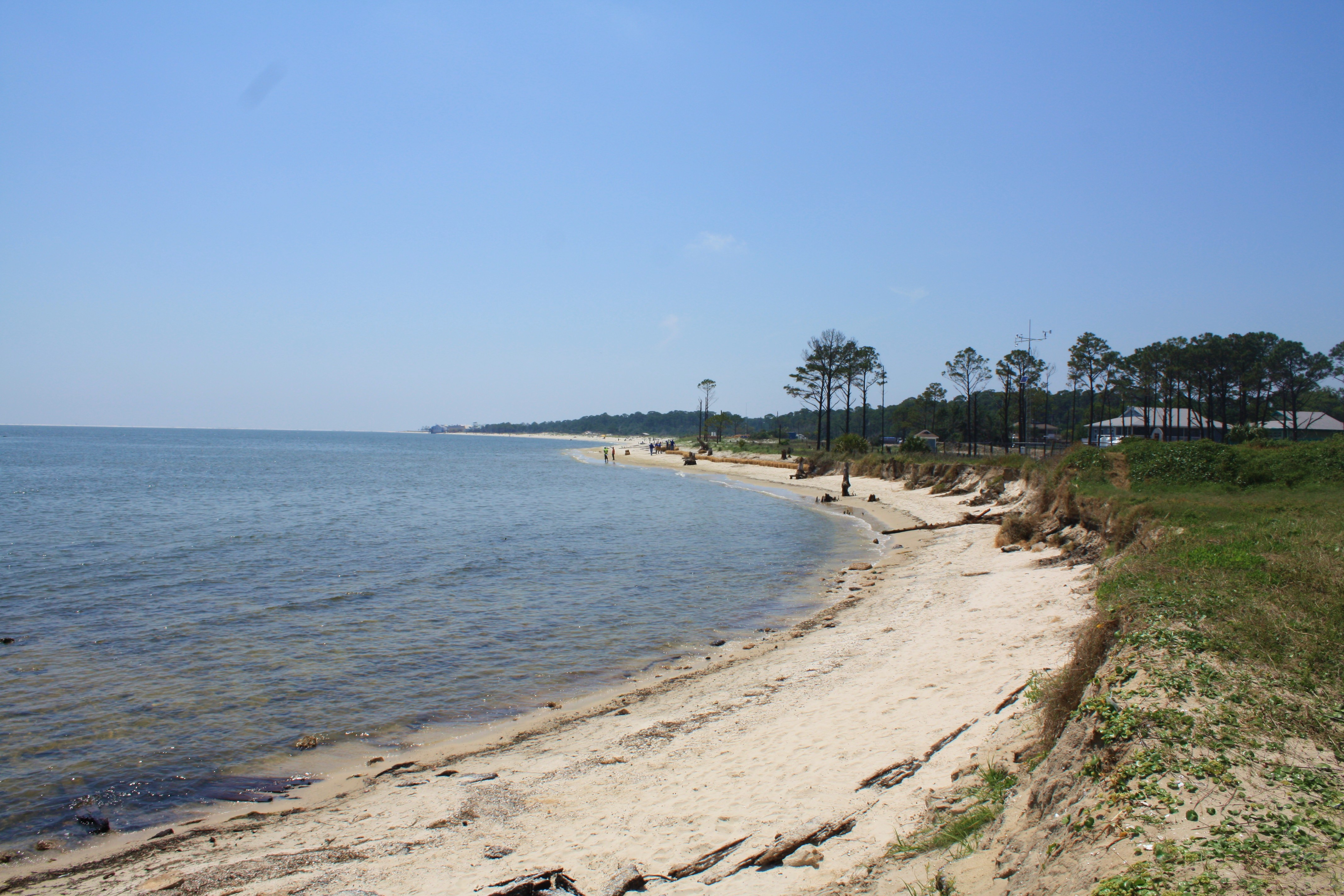
View of the southeastern shore of the island

In 1519, the Spanish explorer Alonso Álvarez de Pineda was the first documented European to visit, staying long enough to map the island with remarkable accuracy.

On January 31, 1699, the French explorer Pierre Le Moyne, sieur d'Iberville, one of the founders of French Louisiana, arrived at Mobile Bay and anchored near the island on his way to explore the mouth of the Mississippi River. D'Iberville mistakenly named it "Île du Massacre" (Massacre Island) because of a large pile of human skeletons discovered there. In reality, the site was a Mississippian burial mound which had been broken open by a hurricane, not a massacre site; however, the dramatic misnomer stuck.

D'Iberville later established a port for Fort Louis de La Louisiane on the island due to its abundant timber, reliable supply of fresh water, and deep-water harbor. The settlement consisted of a fort, a chapel, government-owned warehouses, and residences.

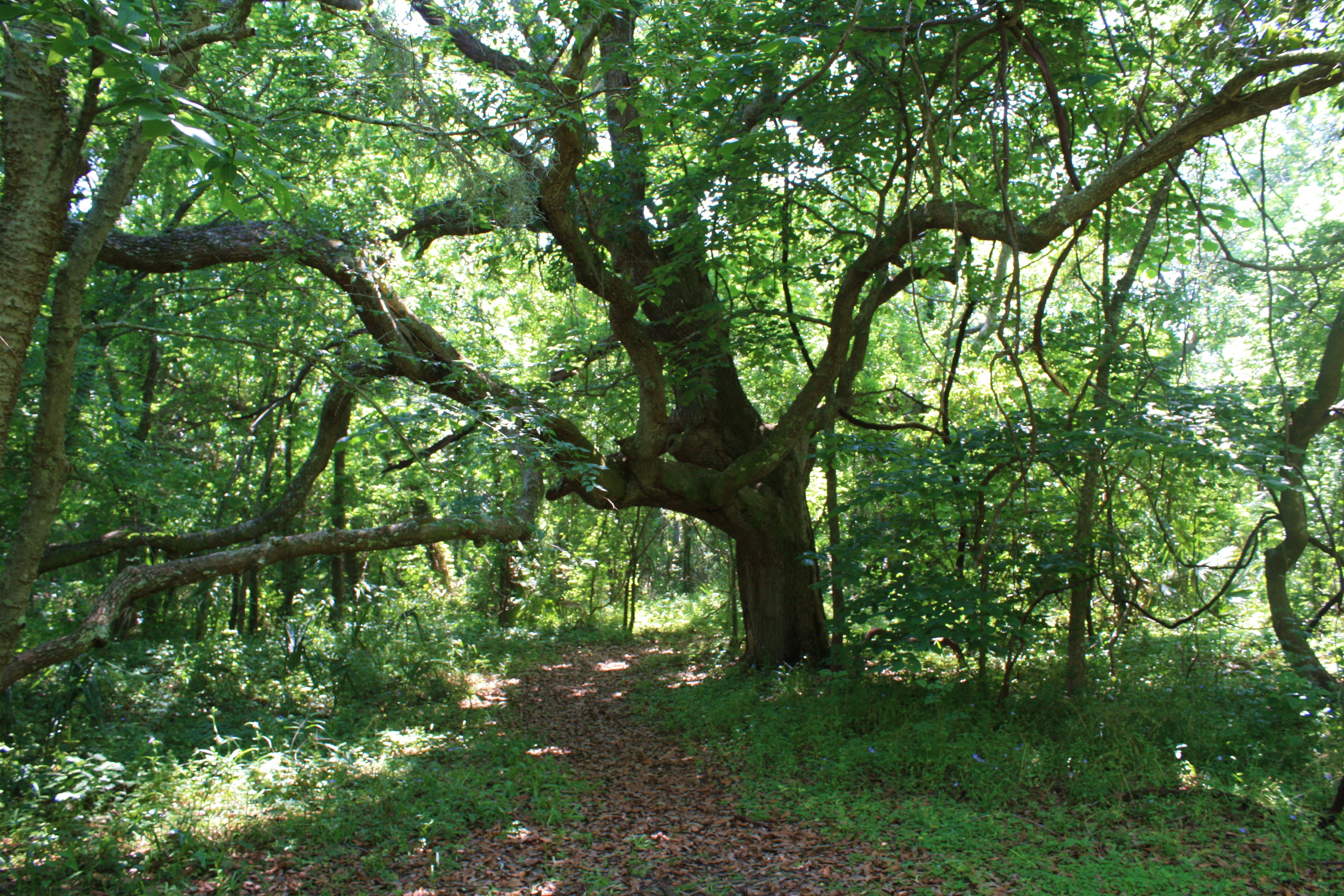
Inside Shell Mound Park

The island served as a major trading depot where goods from Saint-Domingue (Haiti), Mexico, Cuba and France were unloaded and a short-lived fur trade was conducted. Before a channel was dredged, Mobile Bay was too shallow and its sandbars too treacherous for ocean-going vessels to travel up the bay and Mobile River to Fort Louis de La Louisiane. Thus, smaller boats carried the cargo within Mobile Bay to and from Dauphin Island.

The name was changed to "Île du Dauphine" (or Dauphin island) around 1707 to honor the French heir apparent. At that time, the heir was Louis XIV's great-grandson, who would later become King Louis XV of France.

In 1719 the first African slaves of Alabama arrived at Dauphin Island. After the French and Indian War (known in Europe as the Seven Years' War) ended in 1763, the island was ceded to the British. After the American Revolutionary War, the territory again came under Spanish jurisdiction, being part of the Province of West Florida until 1812.

In 1795 after the Treaty of San Lorenzo was signed between Spain and the United States, new settlers began moving to Alabama from Virginia, North & South Carolina and Georgia.

In 1805-1831, the Chickasaw, Cherokee and Choctaw people were forced to cede their lands to the government. The Creek tribes aggressively fought to hold their lands, but eventually were forced to cede in 1813.

Fort Gaines on the eastern tip of the island was built between 1821 and 1848. It was occupied by Confederate forces in 1861 and captured by the Union Army during the Battle of Mobile Bay. The phrase, "Damn the torpedoes, full speed ahead," was supposedly spoken by U. S. Admiral David Glasgow Farragut just a few hundred yards from Dauphin Island's shore.

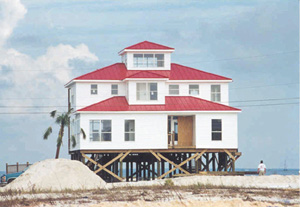
Typical elevated house on Dauphin Island

The first Sand Island Light, authorized in 1834, was replaced by a structure 150 feet (46 m) high, at a cost of $35,000, that was destroyed by Confederate forces. The present lighthouse (1873; in use until 1970), has been placed on the National Register of Historic Places. Its ownership was recently transferred from the U.S. Department of Interior to the town of Dauphin Island.

In 2023, a large alligator was spotted riding waves and sunbathing on the beach of Dauphin Island. Onlookers posted photos of the alligator to social media, which subsequently went viral. While alligators traditionally live in freshwater, they are able to tolerate salt water as well according to the Alabama Department of Conservation and Natural Resources.

== Geography ==
Dauphin Island is 15 miles (24 km) long from east to west, separating the Gulf of Mexico to the south from the Mississippi Sound and Mobile Bay to the north. The island is less than 0.25 miles (0.40 km) wide for most of its length, except for the eastern quarter of the island, which is over 1 mile (1.6 km) wide. According to the U.S. Census Bureau, the island has a land area of 6.3 square miles (16 km^{2}), while the town's total area is much greater: 166.0 square miles (430 km^{2}), with 159.9 square miles (414 km^{2}) of it, or 96.2% of the town, in the water of the surrounding Gulf and bays.

The Dauphin Island Bridge, officially the Gordon Persons Bridge, is the island's sole road connection to the Alabama mainland, carrying State Route 193, which leads north 27 miles (43 km) to Tillmans Corner in the southwest outskirts of Mobile. Downtown Mobile is 37 miles (60 km) north of the island.

=== Climate ===
The climate in this area is characterized by hot, humid summers and generally mild to cool winters. According to the Köppen Climate Classification system, Dauphin Island has a humid subtropical climate, abbreviated "Cfa" on climate maps.

Climate data for Dauphin Island #2, Alabama (1991–2020 normals, extremes 1948–present)
Month	Jan	Feb	Mar	Apr	May	Jun	Jul	Aug	Sep	Oct	Nov	Dec	Year
Record high °F (°C)	81 (27)	80 (27)	83 (28)	88 (31)	95 (35)	99 (37)	101 (38)	102 (39)	97 (36)	93 (34)	90 (32)	85 (29)	102 (39)
Mean maximum °F (°C)	70.5 (21.4)	71.3 (21.8)	76.5 (24.7)	81.1 (27.3)	88.1 (31.2)	91.3 (32.9)	93.7 (34.3)	93.0 (33.9)	91.1 (32.8)	85.6 (29.8)	79.2 (26.2)	73.6 (23.1)	94.7 (34.8)
Mean daily maximum °F (°C)	58.6 (14.8)	61.5 (16.4)	66.8 (19.3)	73.5 (23.1)	80.8 (27.1)	86.2 (30.1)	88.2 (31.2)	88.1 (31.2)	85.2 (29.6)	77.4 (25.2)	67.8 (19.9)	61.2 (16.2)	74.6 (23.7)
Daily mean °F (°C)	52.3 (11.3)	55.4 (13.0)	61.3 (16.3)	68.3 (20.2)	76.0 (24.4)	81.3 (27.4)	83.2 (28.4)	83.2 (28.4)	80.3 (26.8)	72.0 (22.2)	61.7 (16.5)	55.2 (12.9)	69.2 (20.7)
Mean daily minimum °F (°C)	46.1 (7.8)	49.4 (9.7)	55.8 (13.2)	63.1 (17.3)	71.2 (21.8)	76.4 (24.7)	78.2 (25.7)	78.3 (25.7)	75.5 (24.2)	66.7 (19.3)	55.6 (13.1)	49.2 (9.6)	63.8 (17.7)
Mean minimum °F (°C)	30.7 (−0.7)	35.0 (1.7)	40.4 (4.7)	50.3 (10.2)	60.9 (16.1)	70.1 (21.2)	71.8 (22.1)	72.5 (22.5)	67.3 (19.6)	52.9 (11.6)	42.1 (5.6)	36.8 (2.7)	28.5 (−1.9)
Record low °F (°C)	9 (−13)	19 (−7)	23 (−5)	35 (2)	50 (10)	55 (13)	60 (16)	60 (16)	44 (7)	37 (3)	19 (−7)	11 (−12)	9 (−13)
Average precipitation inches (mm)	5.23 (133)	4.35 (110)	4.90 (124)	5.16 (131)	5.01 (127)	5.87 (149)	6.80 (173)	6.80 (173)	5.24 (133)	3.52 (89)	3.86 (98)	5.13 (130)	61.09 (1,552)
Average precipitation days (≥ 0.01 in)	12.2	10.2	9.5	7.4	6.8	10.2	11.6	12.1	8.4	6.8	8.1	11.5	114.8
Source: NOAA

== Demographics ==
Historical population
Census	Pop.	Note	%±
1990	824		—
2000	1,371		66.4%
2010	1,238		−9.7%
2020	1,778		43.6%
U.S. Decennial Census

=== Racial and ethnic composition ===
Dauphin Island town, Alabama – Racial and ethnic composition Note: the US Census treats Hispanic/Latino as an ethnic category. This table excludes Latinos from the racial categories and assigns them to a separate category. Hispanics/Latinos may be of any race.
Race / Ethnicity (NH = Non-Hispanic)	Pop 2000	Pop 2010	Pop 2020	% 2000	% 2010	% 2020
White alone (NH)	1,313	1,197	1,615	95.77%	96.69%	90.83%
Black or African American alone (NH)	6	5	5	0.44%	0.40%	0.28%
Native American or Alaska Native alone (NH)	20	12	19	1.46%	0.97%	1.07%
Asian alone (NH)	8	2	12	0.58%	0.16%	0.67%
Native Hawaiian or Pacific Islander alone (NH)	0	0	3	0.00%	0.00%	0.17%
Other race alone (NH)	0	1	1	0.00%	0.08%	0.06%
Mixed race or Multiracial (NH)	11	12	81	0.80%	0.97%	4.56%
Hispanic or Latino (any race)	13	9	42	0.95%	0.73%	2.36%
Total	1,371	1,238	1,778	100.00%	100.00%	100.00%

=== 2020 census ===
As of the 2020 census, Dauphin Island had a population of 1,778. The median age was 58.2 years. 10.5% of residents were under the age of 18 and 31.6% of residents were 65 years of age or older. For every 100 females there were 97.1 males, and for every 100 females age 18 and over there were 98.4 males age 18 and over.

0.0% of residents lived in urban areas, while 100.0% lived in rural areas.

There were 844 households in Dauphin Island, of which 16.1% had children under the age of 18 living in them. Of all households, 56.6% were married-couple households, 18.1% were households with a male householder and no spouse or partner present, and 19.9% were households with a female householder and no spouse or partner present. About 27.5% of all households were made up of individuals and 14.0% had someone living alone who was 65 years of age or older.

There were 2,043 housing units, of which 58.7% were vacant. The homeowner vacancy rate was 4.6% and the rental vacancy rate was 58.5%.

=== 2010 census ===
As of the census of 2010, there were 1,238 people, 582 households, and 373 families residing in the town. The population density was 199.7 people per square mile (77.1 people/km^{2}). There were 1,818 housing units at an average density of 295.2 units per square mile (114.0 units/km^{2}). The racial makeup of the town was 97.3% White, 0.4% Black or African American, 1.0% Native American, 0.2% Asian, and 1.0% from two or more races. Hispanic or Latino of any race were 0.7% of the population.

There were 582 households, out of which 13.2% had children under the age of 18 living with them, 57.2% were married couples living together, 4.3% had a female householder with no husband present, and 35.9% were non-families. 28.4% of all households were made up of individuals, and 9.8% had someone living alone who was 65 years of age or older. The average household size was 2.10 and the average family size was 2.55.

In the town, the population was spread out, with 12.8% under the age of 18, 4.8% from 18 to 24, 18.0% from 25 to 44, 41.2% from 45 to 64, and 23.1% who were 65 years of age or older. The median age was 53 years. For every 100 females, there were 105.6 males. For every 100 females age 18 and over, there were 101.8 males.

The median income for a household in the town was $56,731, and the median income for a family was $54,844. Males had a median income of $47,308 versus $37,292 for females. The per capita income for the town was $26,771. About 11.4% of families and 15.3% of the population were below the poverty line, including 21.5% of those under age 18 and 0% of those age 65 or over.

=== 2000 census ===
As of the census of 2000, there were 1,371 people (but falling in the 2010 census to 1238: see below) with 601 households and 418 families residing in the town. The population density was 221.2 people per square mile (85.4 people/km^{2}). There were 1,691 housing units at an average density of 272.9 units per square mile (105.4 units/km^{2}). The racial makeup of the town was 96.43% White (1,322 persons), 0.44% Black or African American (6 persons), 1.60% Native American (22 persons), 0.58% Asian (8 persons), and 0.95% from two or more races (13 persons). Hispanic or Latino of any race were 0.95% of the population.

There were 601 households, out of which 21.6% had children under the age of 18 living with them, 61.7% were married couples living together, 5.0% had a female householder with no husband present, and 30.3% were non-families. 23.0% of all households were made up of individuals, and 6.3% had someone living alone who was 65 years of age or older. The average household size was 2.28 and the average family size was 2.66. In the town, the population was spread out, with 17.4% under the age of 18, 7.4% from 18 to 24, 25.7% from 25 to 44, 33.3% from 45 to 64, and 16.2% who were 65 years of age or older. The median age was 45 years. For every 100 females, there were 111.6 males. For every 100 females age 18 and over, there were 114.0 males.

The median income for a household in the town was $44,219, and the median income for a family was $50,476. Males had a median income of $35,179 versus $24,250 for females. The per capita income for the town was $22,552. About 6.0% of families and 9.2% of the population were below the poverty line, including 6.7% of those under age 18 and 5.4% of those age 65 or over.

== Education ==
The town is served by the Mobile County Public School System. It has one public school, Dauphin Island Elementary School. Middle school students go on to Alba Middle School in Bayou La Batre and Alma Bryant High School in Bayou La Batre.

The Dauphin Island Sea Lab is located on the east end of the island on grounds formerly occupied by the 693rd Radar Squadron, Dauphin Island Air Force Station, US Air Force, and is home to the Marine Environmental Sciences Consortium.

== Coat of arms ==
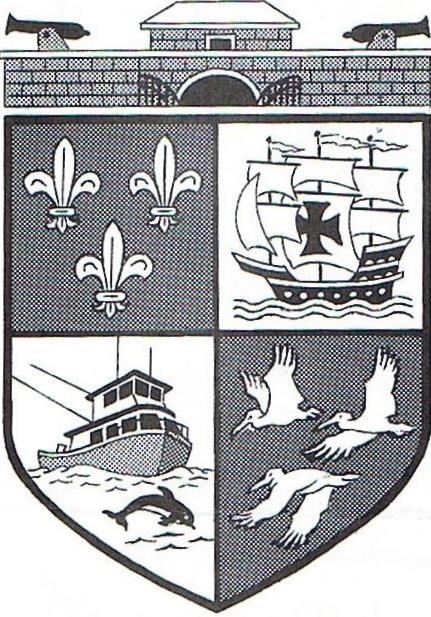
The Dauphin Island Coat of arms

At the top of Dauphin Island's coat of arms is the historic Fort Gaines with two cannons facing north and south, which represent Dauphin Island's role during the Civil War. The boat is a shrimping vessel which represents the livelihood of many of the residents of the island. The dolphin is a mammal seen quite often in the Gulf of Mexico and Mobile Bay waters surrounding the island. The birds are pelicans, which are numerous around the island and the entire Gulf coast. The fleur-de-lis represents the presence of France on the island from 1699 to 1764. The sailing ship is a Spanish galleon to represent Spain's role in settling the area between 1781 and 1813.

== Hurricanes ==
Over the centuries, many hurricanes have struck the island. Some recent storms include:

- In 1969, Hurricane Camille flooded 70% of the island and was the worst storm to strike the area until Hurricane Frederic.
- In 1979, Hurricane Frederic (September 12) destroyed the bridge to the mainland, which had been opened in 1955.
- In 1985, Hurricane Elena brought wind gusts of over 130 mph (210 km/h) to the island.
- In 1997, Hurricane Danny caused extensive flooding on the east end of the island.
- In 1998, Hurricane Georges destroyed 41 houses on the island.
- In 2004, Hurricane Ivan caused nearly one-fourth of the island to be covered with approximately two feet of water.
- On August 29, 2005, Hurricane Katrina brought damage to parts of Dauphin Island. Some homes on the west end of the island were destroyed, and the Katrina Cut was formed as a channel splitting off the western part. However, most areas of the central and east end of the island experienced little flooding from the storm surge. The approach road to the island fared better than expected. The damage to most East End beachfront homes was limited to decks, stairs and storage buildings. In DeSoto Landing, a gated Gulf-front subdivision on Dauphin Island, the main homes had no water entering the homes unless a window or roof system failed; many avoided surge waters entirely. Damage was limited due to Sand Island (Pelican Island), a large sandbar south of DeSoto Landing which broke the force of battering waves. An oil drilling platform grounded near the island as the hurricane passed by. It was identified by its owners, Diamond Offshore Drilling Inc., as the Ocean Warwick, pushed nearly 60 miles (97 km) from its original location by the hurricane.
- On September 14, 2020, storm surge from offshore Hurricane Sally flooded the island.

== Tourist attractions ==
The old walled Fort Gaines is on the east end of Dauphin Island. A ferry from nearby Fort Morgan in Gulf Shores brings both vehicles and pedestrians to the island. One of the closest attractions to the ferry dock is the George F. Crozier Estuarium, a freshwater and saltwater aquarium highlighting species native to Alabama.

The Dauphin Island Heritage and Arts Council features works by local artists, as well as information on the history of Dauphin Island. It organizes the annual Dauphin Island Native American Festival.

== See also ==
- Dauphin County, Pennsylvania
- History of Mobile, Alabama
