= Fort Gaines (Alabama) =

- U.S. National Register of Historic Places
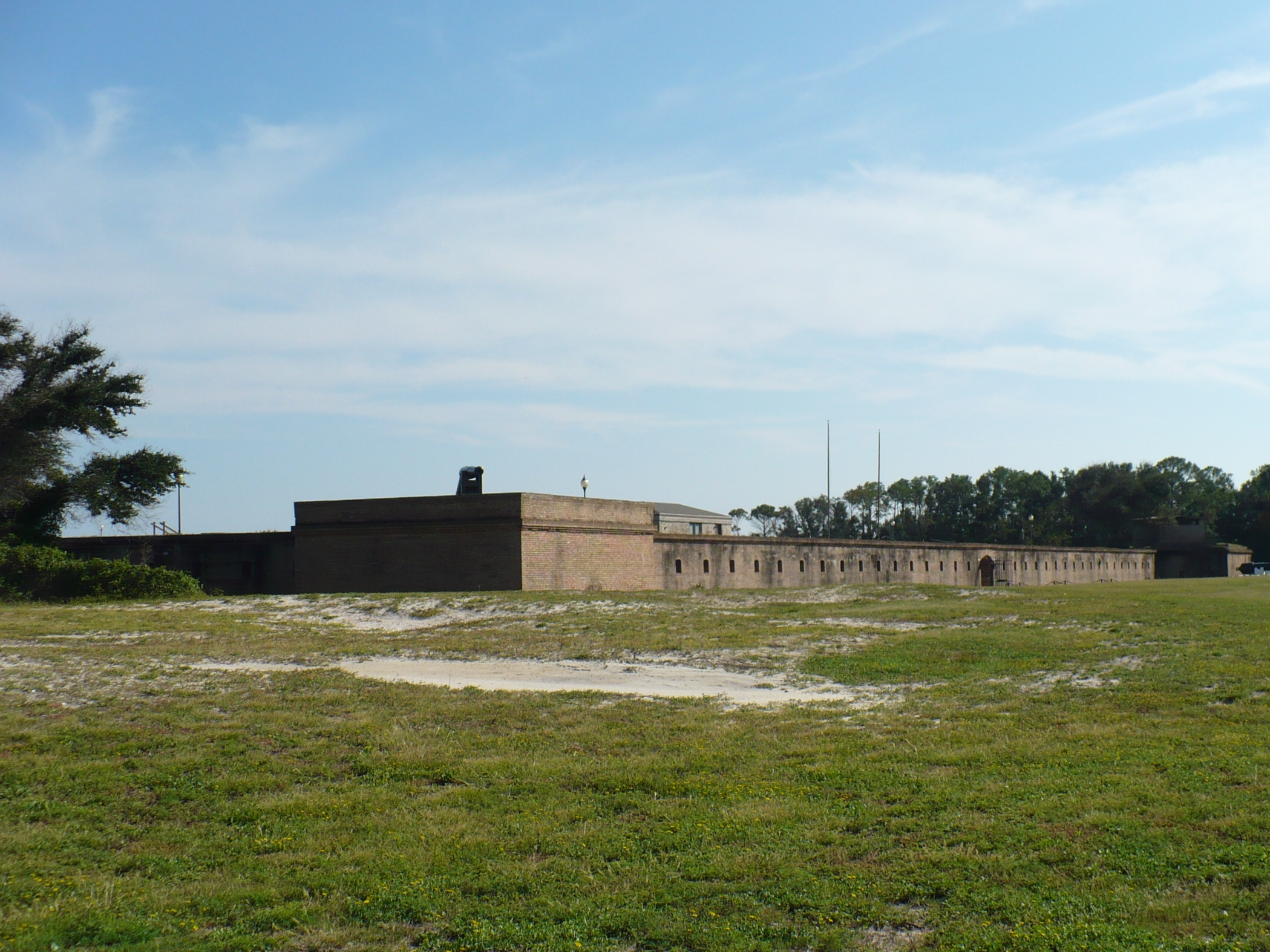
- Northern (entrance) facade of Fort Gaines in 2008

- Location within Alabama Location within the United States
- Location: Dauphin Island, Alabama, US
- Nearest city: Mobile, Alabama
- Coordinates: 30°14′54″N 88°04′32″W
- Built: 1821
- Architect: Totten, Joseph G.
- NRHP reference No.: 76000348
- Added to NRHP: December 12, 1976

Fort Gaines is a historic fort on Dauphin Island, Alabama, United States. It was named for Edmund Pendleton Gaines. Established in 1821, it is best known for its role in the Battle of Mobile Bay during the American Civil War.

== Exhibits ==
Exhibits include the huge anchor from USS Hartford, Admiral David Farragut's flagship on which he gave his world-famous command, "Damn the torpedoes – full speed ahead!" The fort also has the original cannons used in the battle, five pre-Civil War brick buildings in the interior courtyard, operational blacksmith shop and kitchens, tunnel systems to the fortified corner bastions, and similar features. A museum details the history of this period, as well as the French colonial presence beginning in the late 17th century. The fort was partially modernized for the Spanish–American War. It is a tourist destination with tours and historical reenactment events. The site is considered to be one of the nation's best-preserved Civil War era masonry forts and has been nominated for listing as a National Historic Landmark.

== Condition ==
Significant masonry damage had been sustained during hurricanes and tropical storms during its lifetime. Though this damage has been largely repaired, the fort continues to be under threat from erosion. The fort sits on the east end of Dauphin Island, only feet from the Gulf of Mexico. Ongoing erosional losses of sand dunes and beach total up to 10 feet per year. For these reasons, the Civil War Preservation Trust placed Fort Gaines on its History Under Siege listing on March 18, 2009. The listing identifies the ten most endangered Civil War battlefields in the United States. Additionally it was placed on the list of America's 11 Most Endangered Historic Places by the National Trust for Historic Preservation in 2011.

== Popular culture ==
Fort Gaines was the setting for one episode of MTV's Fear.

== Gallery ==
Images of Fort Gaines
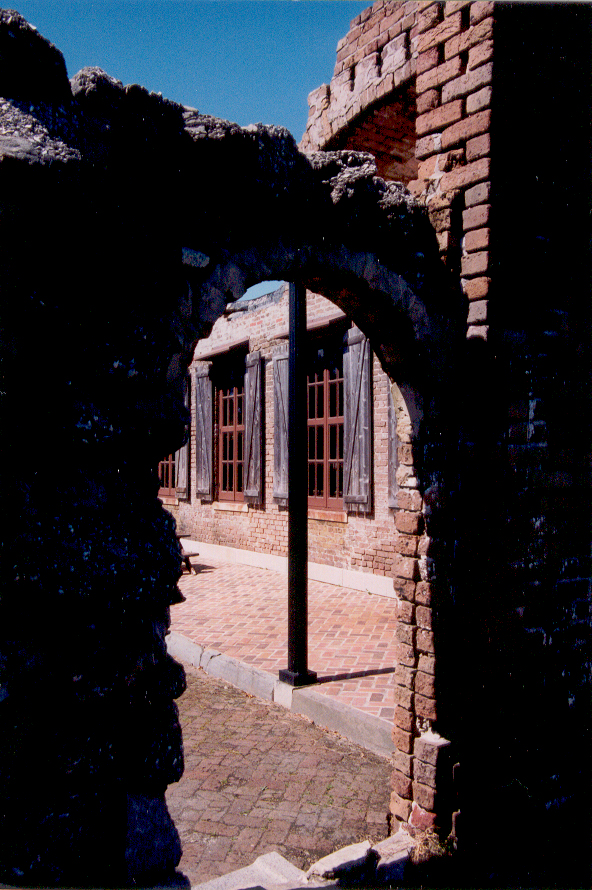
Inside the fort

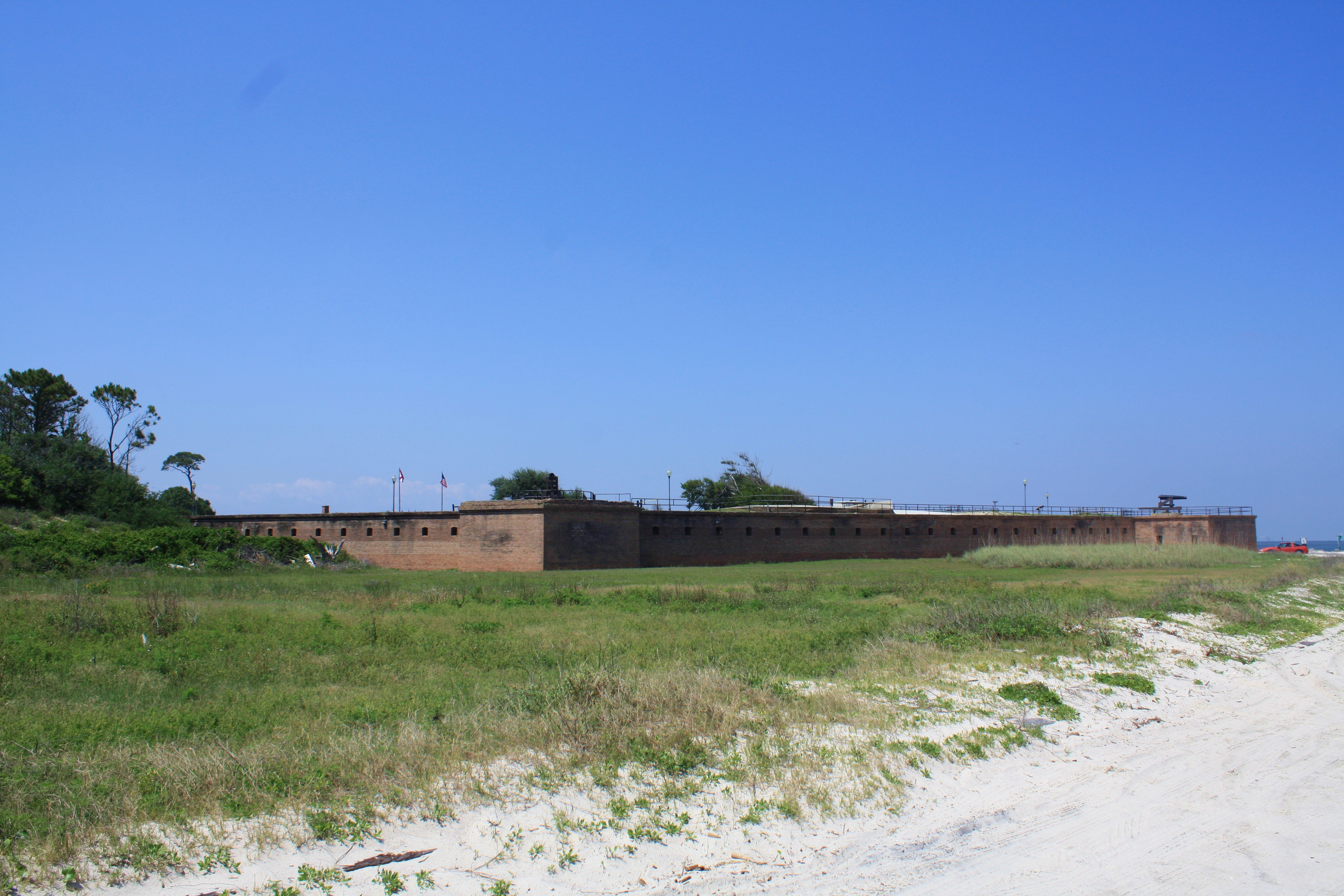
Looking to the north at the south side of the fort in 2010

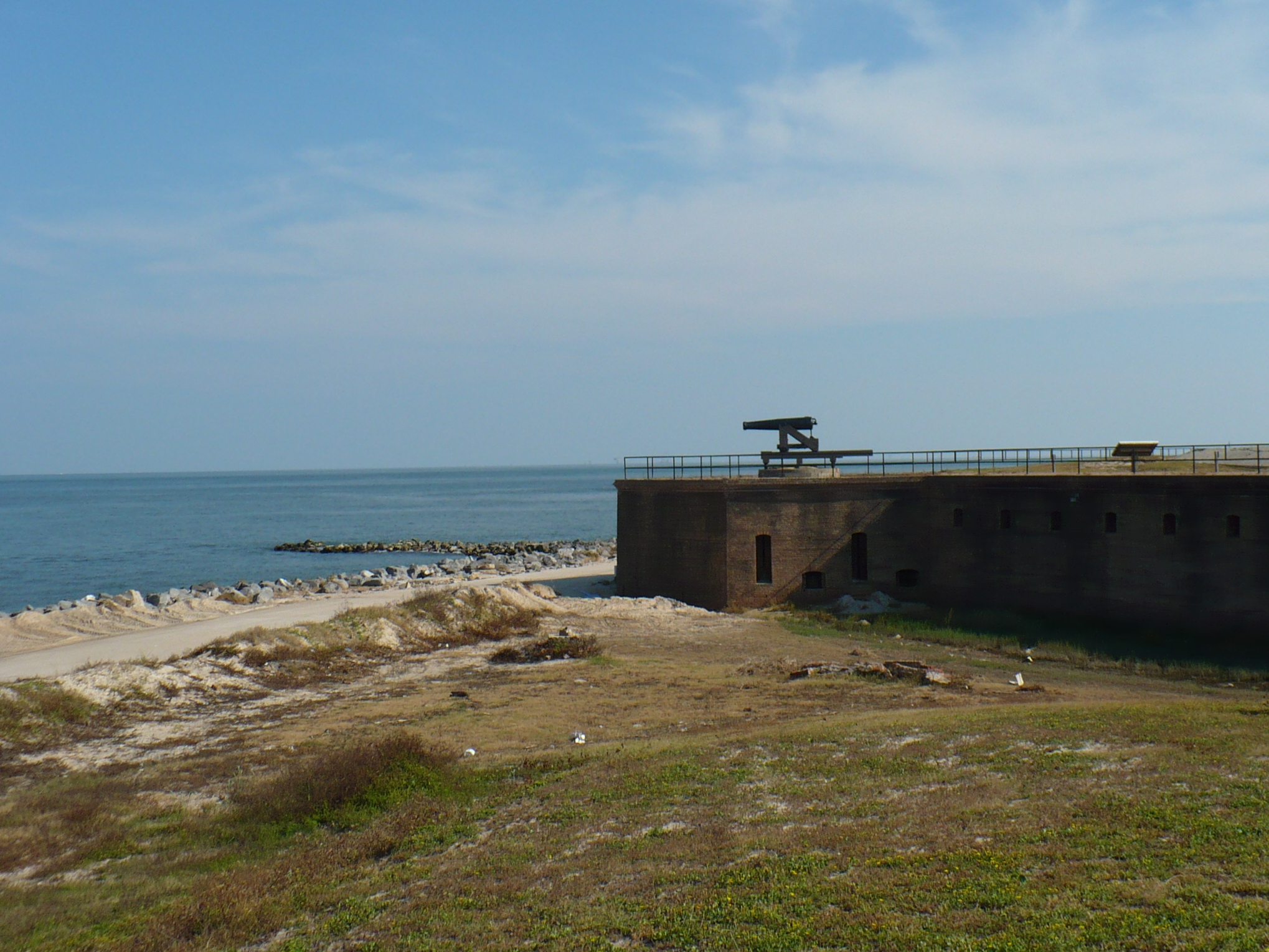
Looking to the southwest over the fort in 2008

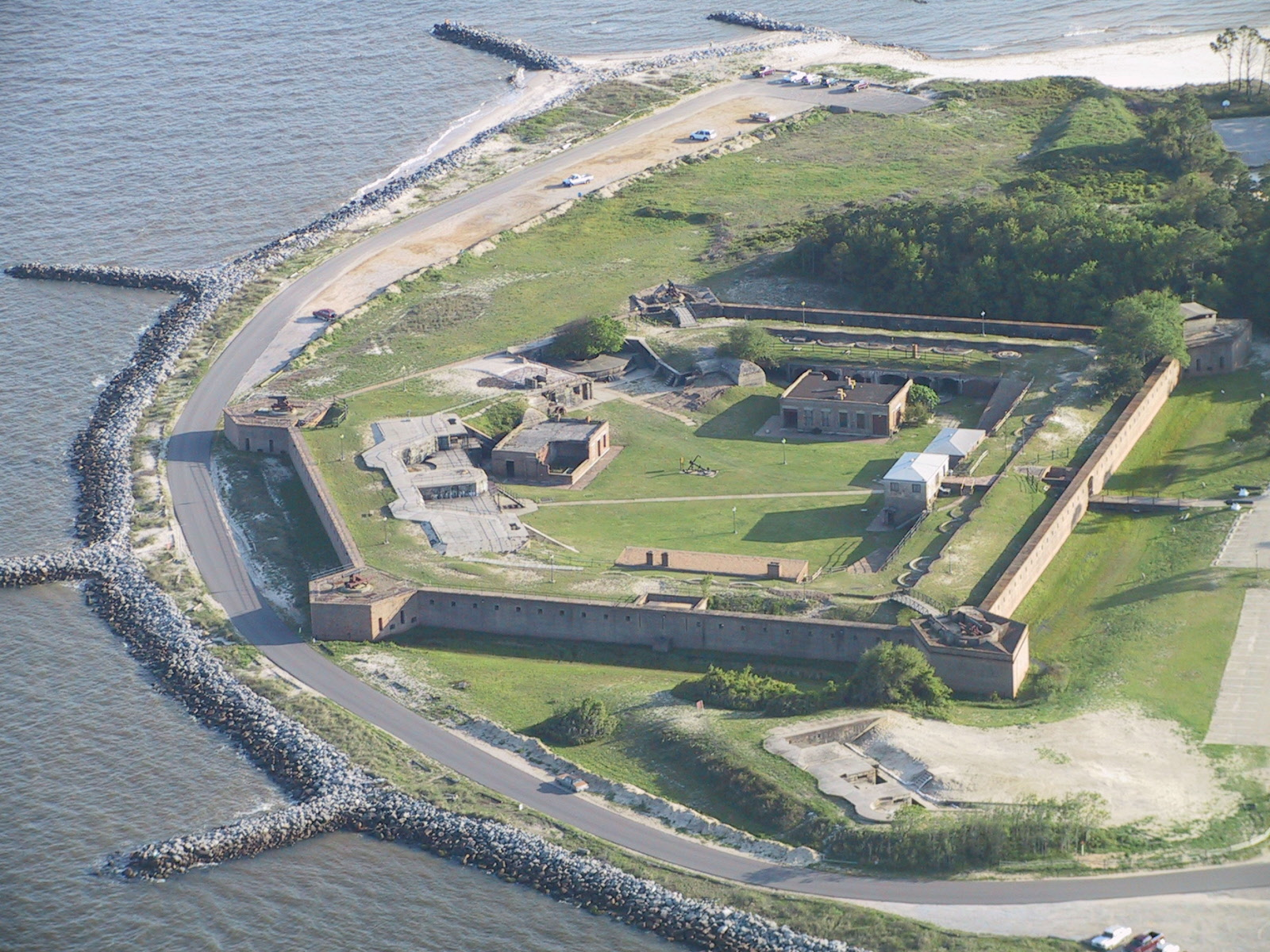
Fort Gaines, April 2002

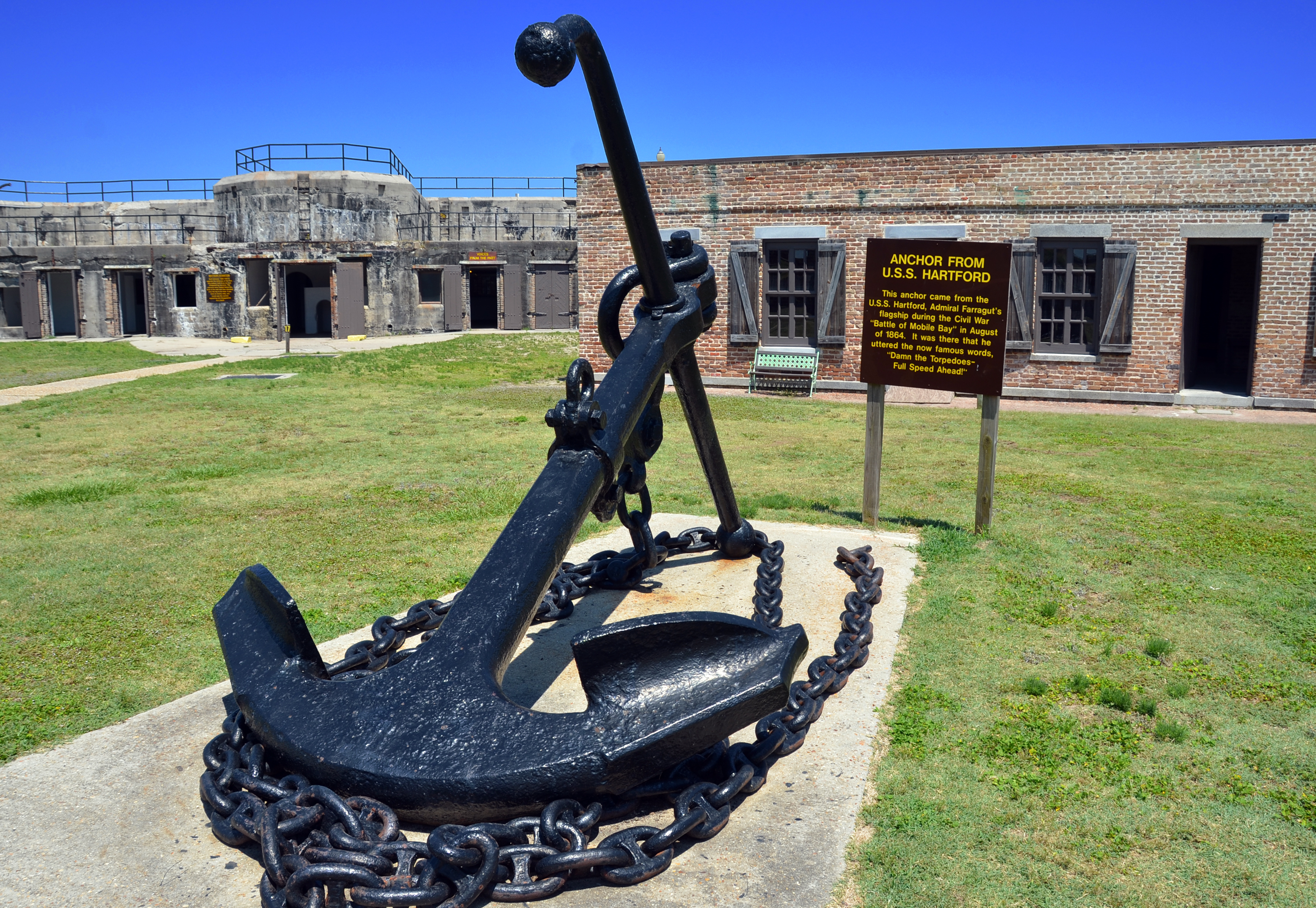
Anchor from the USS Hartford, located in the center of the fort, June 2012

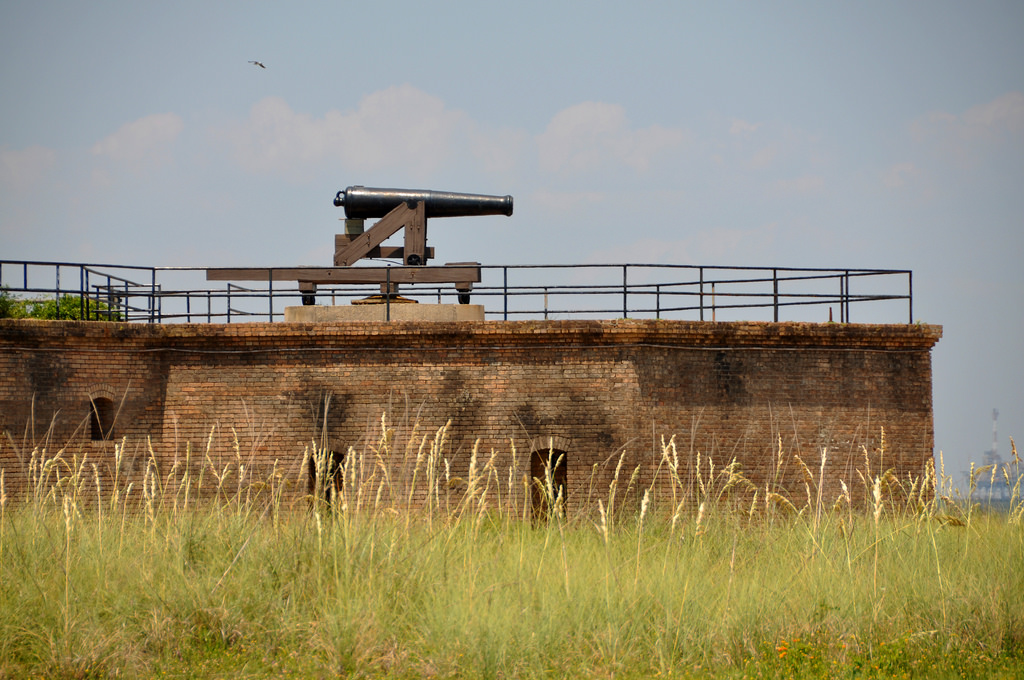
Cannon, August 2015

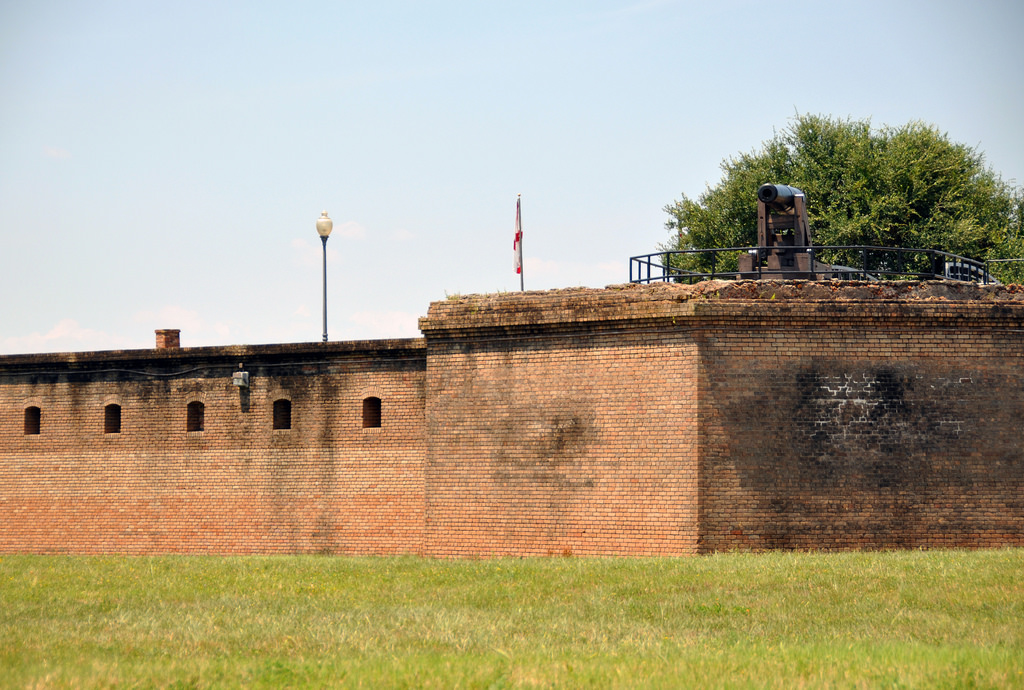
Wall of the fort, August 2015

== See also ==
- Battle of Mobile Bay
- History of Mobile, Alabama
