= Middle Bay Light =

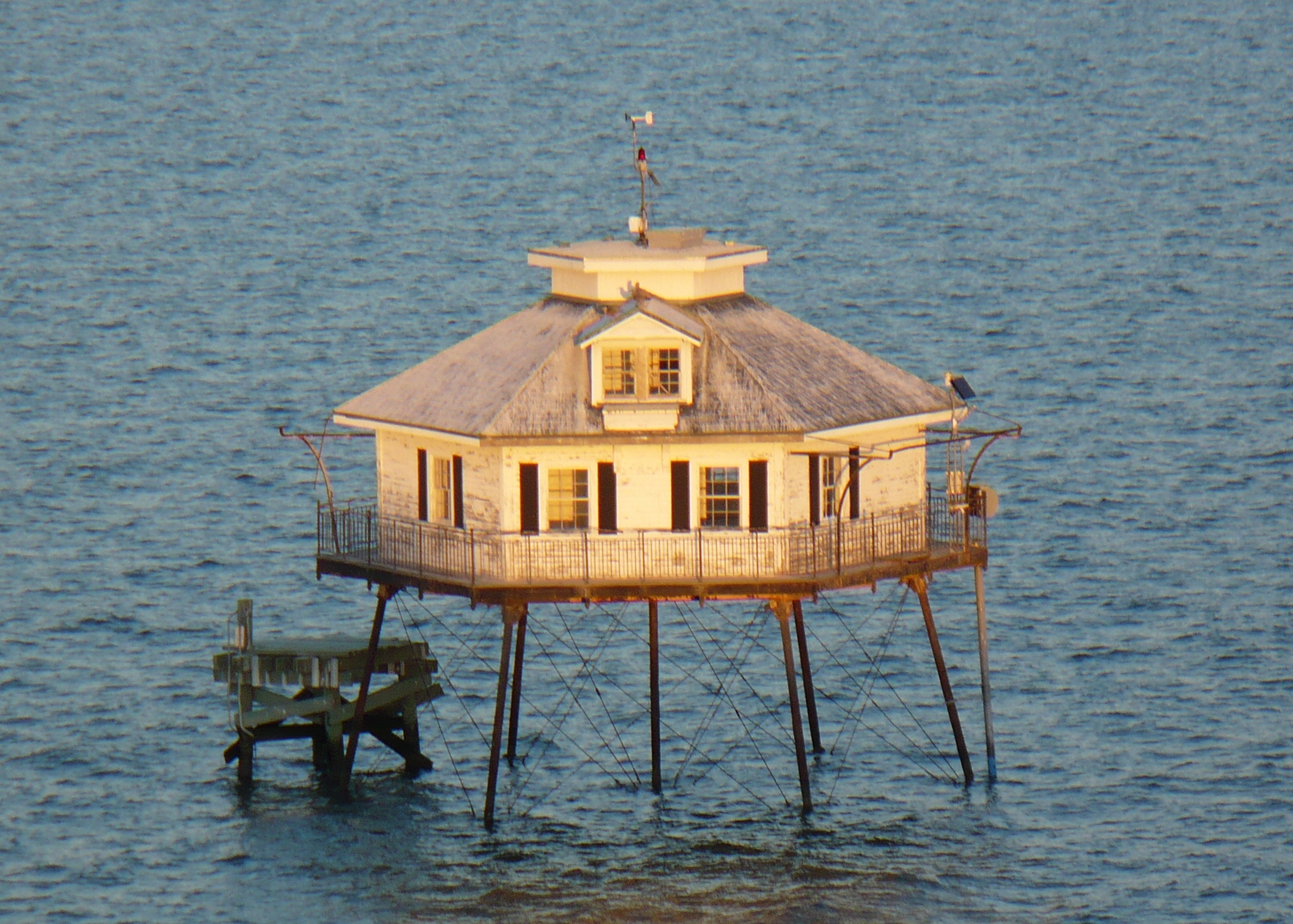
- Middle Bay Light in Mobile Bay, near Mobile, Alabama.
- Location: Middle of Mobile Bay, Mobile Bay, Alabama
- Coordinates: 30°26′17.60″N 88°0′40.48″W

Tower
- Constructed: 1885
- Foundation: screw piles
- Construction: wooden screw-pile lighthouse
- Automated: 1935
- Height: 41 feet (12 m)
- Shape: hexagonal frustum structure with platform, keeper’s quarter and mast with beacon centered on the roof
- Markings: white lighthouse
- Power source: solar power
- Operator: Alabama Historical Commission
- Heritage: National Register of Historic Places listed place

Light
- Focal height: 48 feet (15 m)
- Lens: Fourth order Fresnel lens (1885), 155 mm solar-powered lens (current)
- Range: 4 nmi (7.4 km; 4.6 mi)
- Characteristic: Fl R 6s., bell struck by machinery every 5 seconds.
- Middle Bay Light
- U.S. National Register of Historic Places
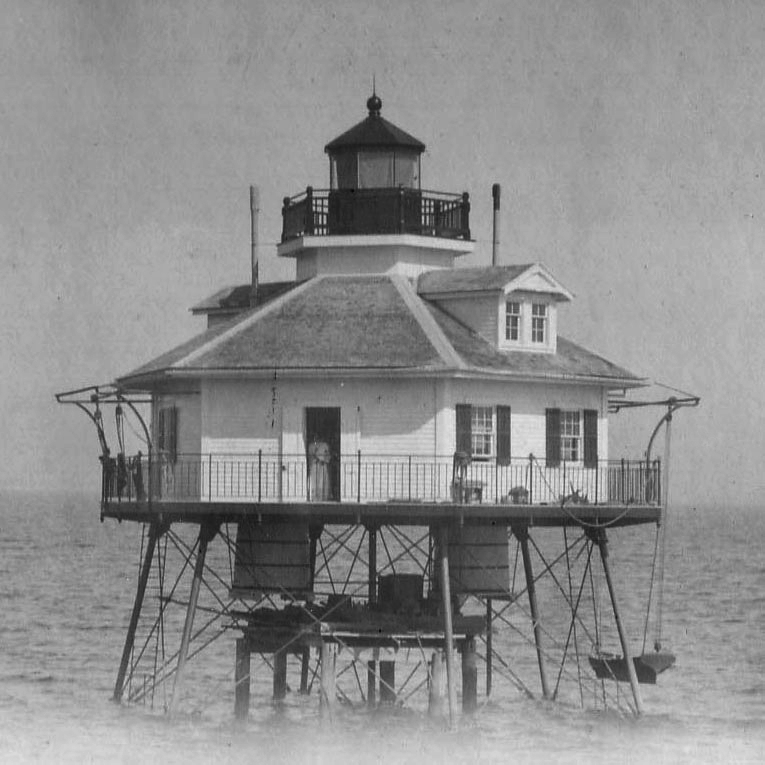
- Middle Bay Light circa 1940.
- Architect: Captain John Grant
- NRHP reference No.: 74000429
- Added to NRHP: December 30, 1974

Middle Bay Light, also known as Middle Bay Lighthouse and Mobile Bay Lighthouse, is an active hexagonal-shaped cottage style screw-pile lighthouse. The structure is located offshore from Mobile, Alabama, in the center of Mobile Bay.

== History ==
The station was activated in 1885. In 1916 the keeper's wife gave birth to a baby that summer at the station. According to the Alabama Lighthouse Association web site, the keeper brought a dairy cow to the station and corralled it on a section of the lower deck because his wife was unable to nurse the newborn baby. All had to be evacuated when the station survived but was damaged by a hurricane that year. The light was automated in 1935.

The lighthouse was placed on the National Register of Historic Places on December 30, 1974. In 1984 the lighthouse was stabilized by Middle Bay Light Centennial Commission in preparation for the centennial celebration. In 1996 the Coast Guard loaned the original Fresnel lens to the Ft. Morgan Museum for public display. In 2002 restoration efforts were begun to repair the lighthouse.

In 2003, a real-time weather station was added to the lighthouse by the Dauphin Island Sea Lab and the Mobile Bay National Estuary Program. This program is now called ARCOS (Alabama's Realtime Coastal Observing System) and is still active today. The weather station, one of seven in Mobile Bay, samples precipitation, total and quantum solar radiation, air temperature, relative humidity, wind speed and direction, barometric pressure, water temperature, salinity, water depth, and dissolved oxygen. These data can be viewed in real time. From late 2011 - mid 2014 currents and waves were also displayed.

== Light ==
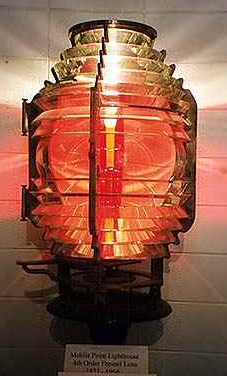
The light itself

Whale oil was the first fuel used and the lighthouse tenders worked in shifts making sure that the lamps did not go out and smoke the lens. In later years kerosene was used and eventually they were converted to electricity.

== See also ==
- Mobile Point Range Lights
- Sand Island Light (Alabama)
- List of lighthouses in the United States
