= Bangor, Alabama =

Unincorporated community in Alabama, United States

- Unincorporated community
- Location within Alabama Location within the United States
- Coordinates: 33°58′28″N 86°45′24″W
- Country: United States
- State: Alabama
- County: Blount
- Elevation: 476 ft (145 m)
- Time zone: UTC−6 (Central (CST))
  - Summer (DST): UTC−5 (CDT)
- Area codes: 205, 659
- GNIS feature ID: 157883

Bangor, also known as Coopers Gap, Copperas Gap, or Coppers Gap, is an unincorporated community in Blount County, Alabama, United States. Nearby Bangor Cave housed a speakeasy during Prohibition and continues to be a popular attraction for area spelunkers.

The community lies east of Interstate 65 and approximately 30 miles north of Birmingham.

Bangor is located near the former resort community of Blount Springs. In 1937, the landowner of Bangor Cave, J. Breck Musgrove, convinced investors to provide funds for the construction of a nightclub in the cave. The cave soon included a bar, electric lighting, a bandstand, and a lounge for women. A locked room contained slot machines, roulette wheels and card tables. A spur track of the Louisville & Nashville Railroad could drop visitors off at the entrance to the cave. The caveowners faced legal battles with Alabama governor Bibb Graves, and the Bangor Cafe Club was permanently closed in January 1939.

== Notable person ==
- Earl Reid, former professional baseball player for the Boston Braves
