= Alabama State Route 217 =

State highway in Alabama, United States

State Route 217
- Lott Road

Route information
- Maintained by ALDOT
- Length: 31 mi (50 km)

Major junctions
- South end: US 45 in Eight Mile
- North end: CR 21 southwest of Citronelle

Location
- Country: United States
- State: Alabama
- Counties: Mobile

Highway system
- Alabama State Highway System; Interstate; US; State
← SR 216	→ SR 219

State Route 217 (SR 217) is a 31-mile-long (50 km) route that serves as a connection between Eight Mile and Citronelle through western Mobile County.

== Route description ==
The southern terminus of SR 217 is located at its intersection with US 45 in Eight Mile. From this point, the route travels in gradual loop towards the northwest before turning towards the northeast en route to its northern terminus with Mobile County Road 21 (CR 21) southwest of Citronelle. Along its route it is known as Lott Road throughout its entire length.

== Major intersections ==
The entire route is in Mobile County.

Location	mi	km	Destinations	Notes
Eight Mile			US 45 (Saint Stephens Road/SR 17) – Prichard, Citronelle	Southern terminus
Semmes			CR 31 south (Schillinger Road) to US 98 Newburn Road north to SR 158 east	
			CR 21 (Earlville Road/Prine Road) to US 45 / MS 594 – Citronelle	Northern terminus; road continues northwest as Lott Road towards the Mississippi state line
1.000 mi = 1.609 km; 1.000 km = 0.621 mi
