= Interstate 65 in Alabama =

Highway in Alabama

Interstate 65
- I-65 highlighted in red

Route information
- Maintained by ALDOT
- Length: 366.229 mi (589.388 km)
- NHS: Entire route

Major junctions
- South end: I-10 in Mobile
- I-165 in Prichard; I-85 in Montgomery; I-459 in Hoover; I-20 / I-59 in Birmingham; I-22 in Fultondale; I-565 / US 72 Alt. in Decatur
- North end: I-65 / US 31 at the Tennessee state line near Ardmore

Location
- Country: United States
- State: Alabama
- Counties: Mobile, Baldwin, Escambia, Conecuh, Butler, Lowndes, Montgomery, Elmore, Autauga, Chilton, Shelby, Jefferson, Blount, Cullman, Morgan, Limestone

Highway system
- Interstate Highway System; Main; Auxiliary; Suffixed; Business; Future; Alabama State Highway System; Interstate; US; State
← SR 64	→ SR 65

Interstate 65 (I-65) meanders across 366 miles (589 km) of the Alabama countryside linking six of the state's 10 largest cities. The highway links together many important roadways that make commerce inside and outside of the state's boundaries possible. It starts at I-10 near Mobile. The route passes through or near the major cities of Montgomery, Birmingham, Decatur, Huntsville, and Athens before entering Tennessee in the north near the town of Ardmore, Alabama.

The entire Alabama portion of I-65 is dedicated as Heroes Highway in honor of Central Intelligence Agency officer Johnny Micheal Spann and all of the people who died during the September 11 attacks.

== Route description ==
=== Mobile to Birmingham ===
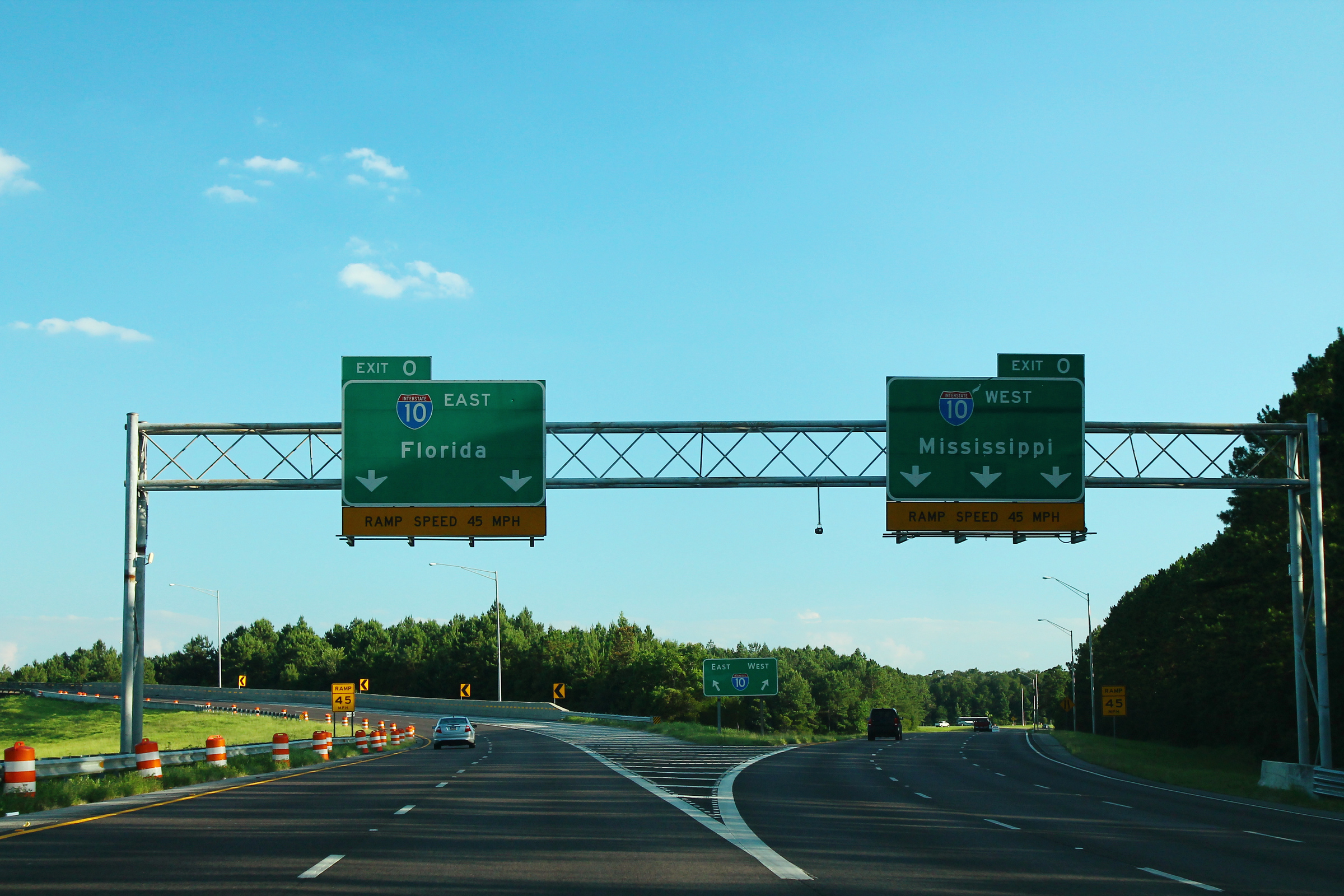
Southern terminus at I-10 in Mobile

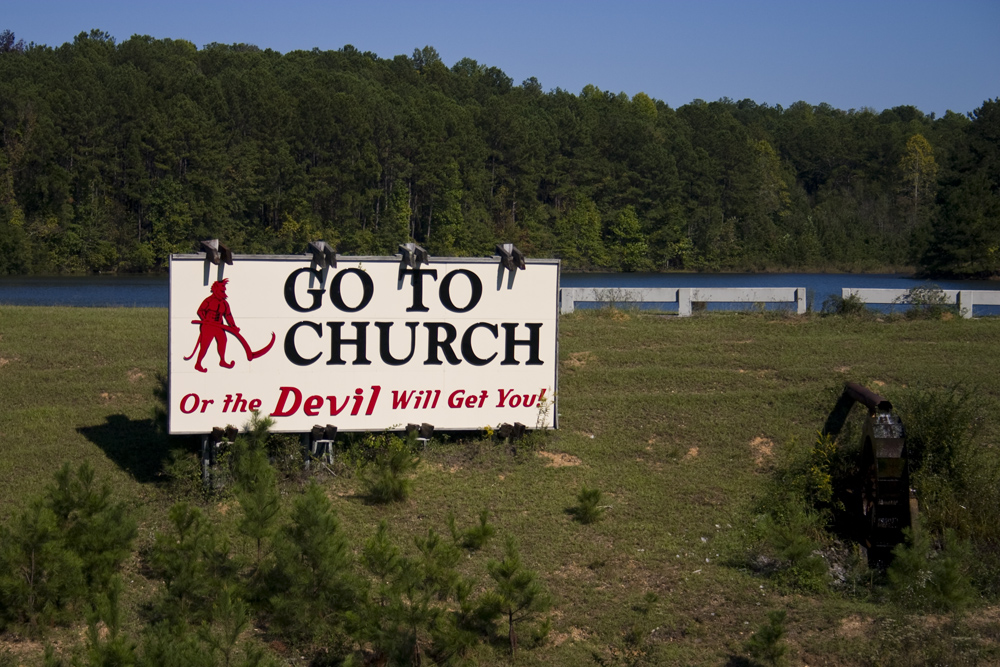
Billboard along I-65 north, north of Prattville and just south of milemarker 191

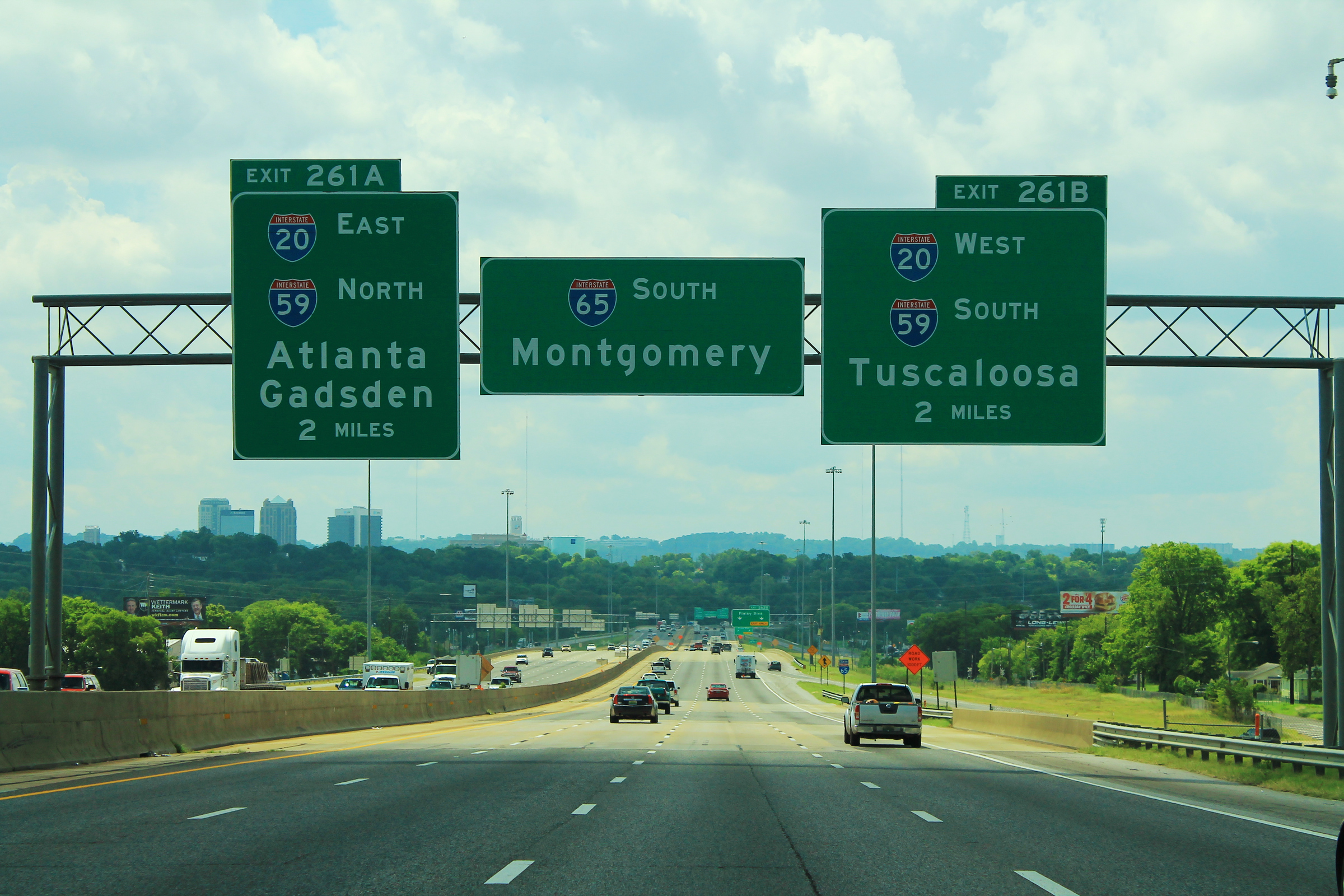
I-65 south approaching Birmingham and Malfunction Junction

I-65 starts its northward journey in Mobile as a three-lane freeway at a directional T interchange with I-10 not far from the Gulf of Mexico. From there, it runs northeast, intersecting with I-165 in Prichard at exit 9. At exit 13 in Saraland, the Interstate transitions from three to two lanes. The highway next crosses the Mobile–Tensaw River Delta at the General W.K. Wilson Jr. Bridge. En route to Montgomery, it passes county seats Evergreen (Conecuh County) and Greenville (Butler County). In the case of a hurricane evacuation on Alabama's coast, I-65 can be converted to an evacuation route where all lanes flow in the northbound direction from Mobile to Montgomery. This process is known as contraflow. The terrain on this stretch of road is slightly hilly, aside from a stretch in southern Conecuh County near Castleberry, where the road is slightly mountainous as it descends over 400 feet (120 m) into the southern plains of Alabama.

As the I-65 approaches the Montgomery city limits, the Hyundai Motor Company's automotive plant can be found just off freeway. It can be accessed using the Pintlala–Hope Hull exit (exit 164). After entering the city limits, I-65 intersects U.S. Route 80 (US 80, exit 167; which leads to Selma toward the west) where the Interstate gains an additional lane for a total of three lanes in each direction. Further on, it intersects the southern terminus of I-85 and crosses the Alabama River north of the city. At exit 181, which provide access to Prattville and Wetumpka, I-65's lanes drop to two.

At Chilton County, I-65 enters the Birmingham metropolitan area. Approximately halfway between Montgomery and Birmingham, it passes Clanton, the county seat, where the water tower, visible from the road, is shaped and painted to resemble a huge peach. Between exit 212 (State Route 145 (SR 145)) and exit 219 (County Road 42), I-65 was designated "War on Terror Memorial Highway" in 2014.

I-65 junctions with US 31 (exit 238) in Alabaster, where the Interstate carries three to four lanes until I-20/I-59. I-65 intersects I-459 in Hoover, then passes through the cities of Vestavia Hills and Homewood, which often generate heavy traffic. As the Interstate passes by downtown Birmingham, southbound travelers have a view of the Vulcan statue atop Red Mountain. At the north edge of downtown, I-65 reaches the I-20/I-59 intersection (exit 261) with a crossover interchange, often called "Malfunction Junction", through which the highway has five lanes, continuing on northward with four.

=== Northern Alabama ===
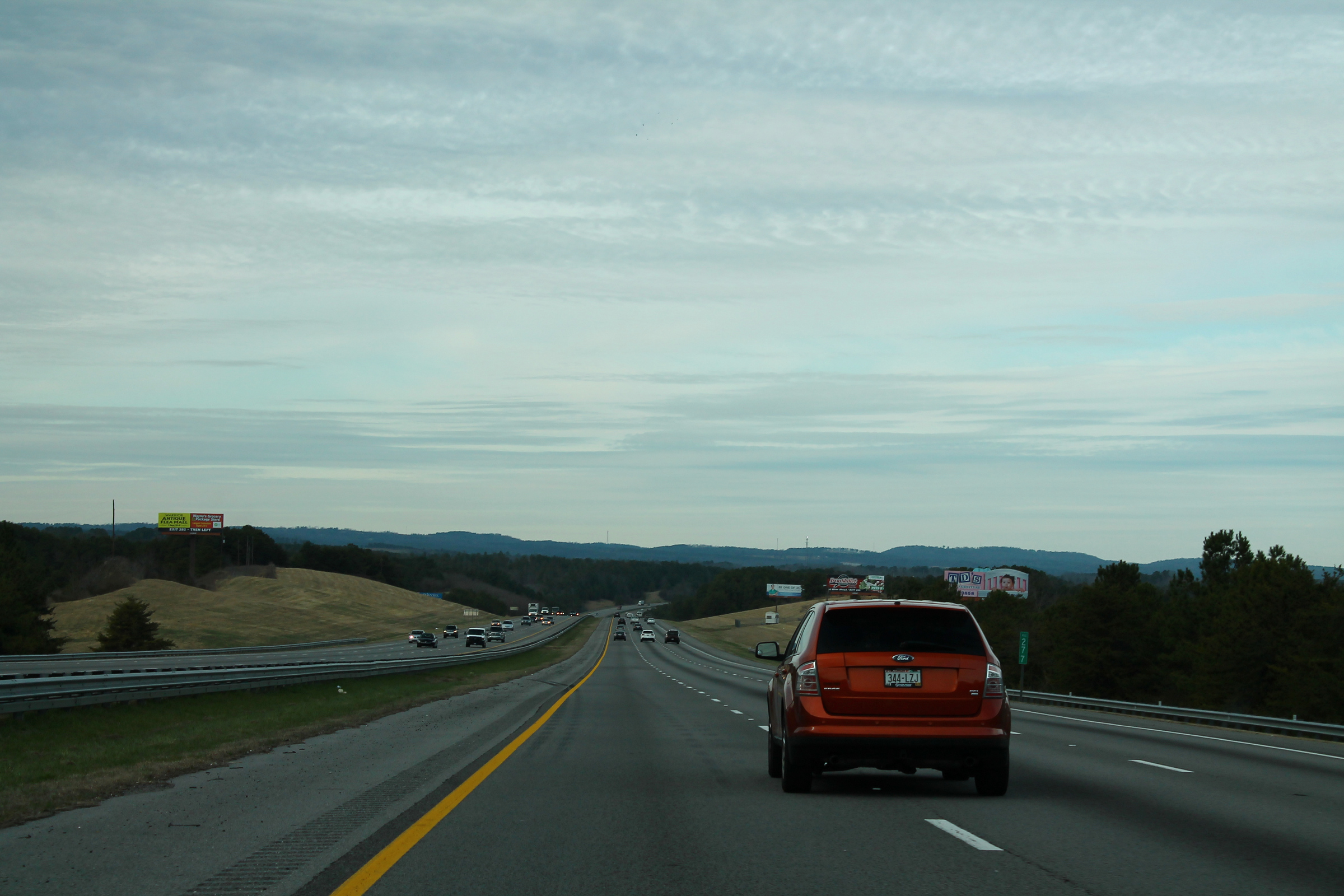
I-65 between Birmingham and Decatur near milemarker 277

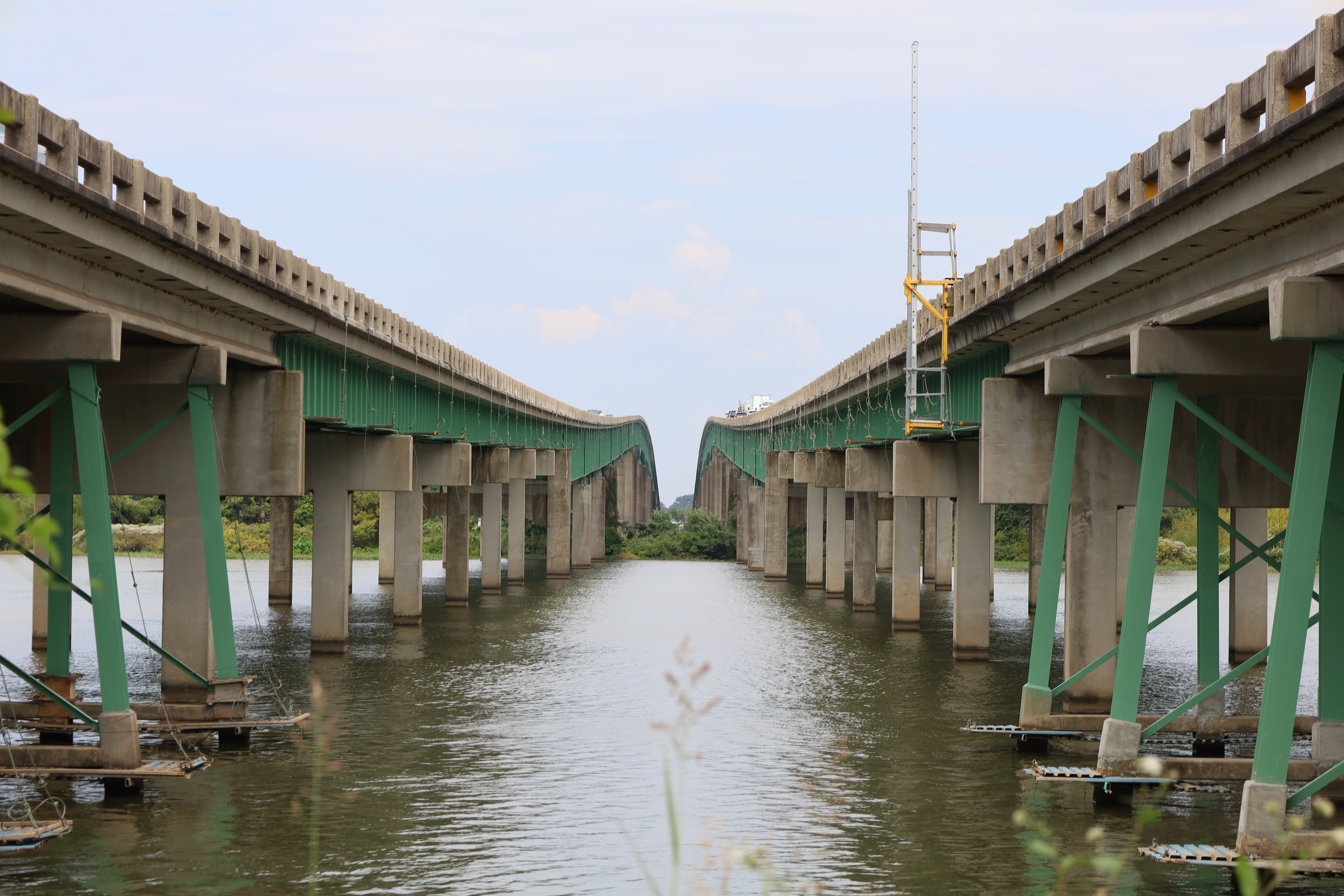
The bridge carrying I-65 over the Tennessee River near Decatur

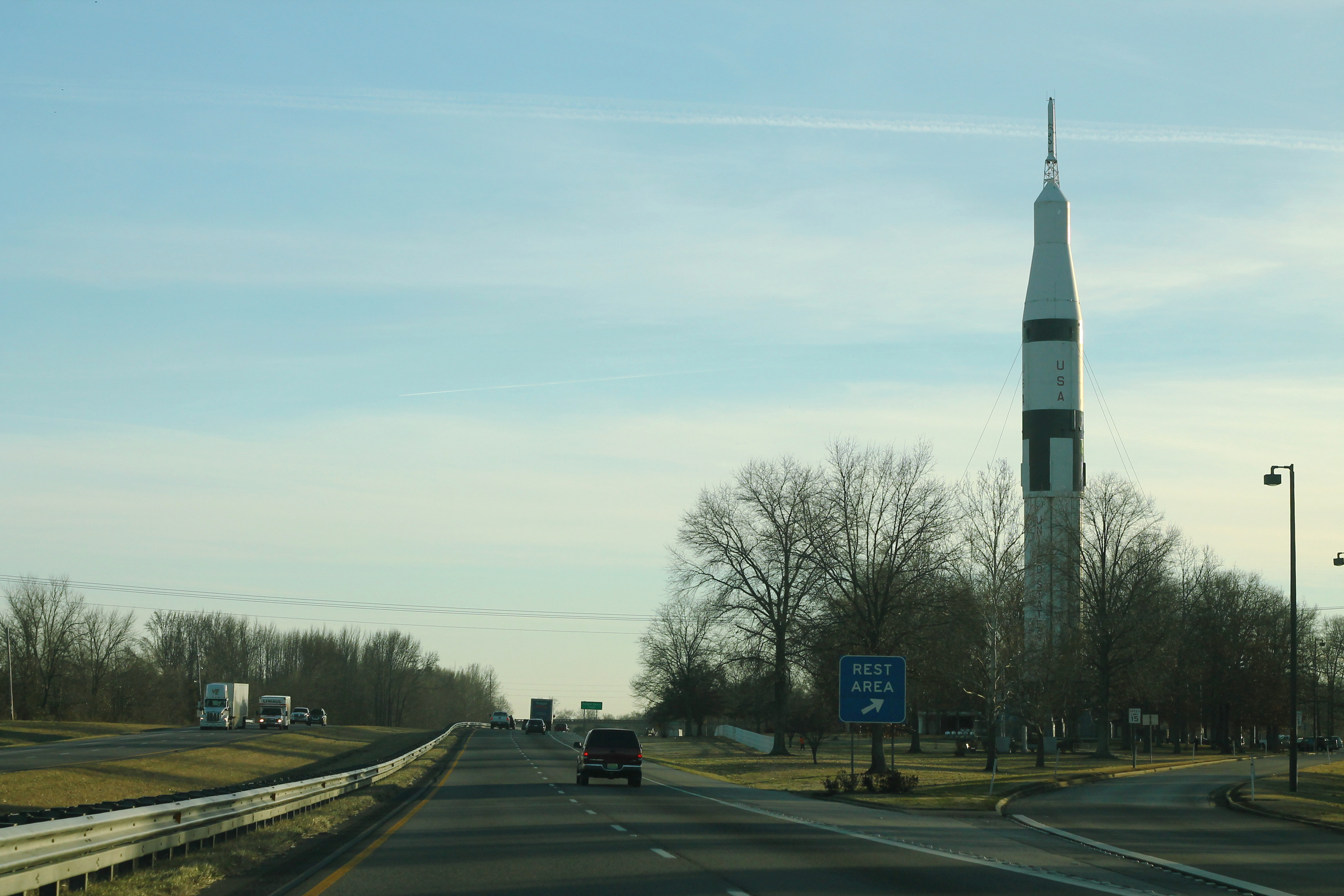
I-65 south Alabama Welcome Center and rest area with the Saturn IB rocket

North of Birmingham at mile 266, interchange ramps provide access to parallel US 31. It is here that I-65 meets the eastern terminus of I-22, which heads northwest to Memphis, Tennessee, filling in a gap in the Interstate Highway System. After which, I-65 intersects Walker Chapel Road (exit 267) in Fultondale, where the Interstate drops to three lanes. The Interstate then continues 98 miles (158 km) in the general direction of Huntsville, crossing the Blount–Cullman county line (milemarker 291), where lanes transition from three to two, as well as passing the city of Cullman on the way. After entering the Decatur metropolitan area, in southern Morgan County, the Interstate passes Decatur. The highway connects the Huntsville–Decatur metropolitan area as it crosses the Wheeler Lake impoundment on the Tennessee River on the Interstate 65 Tennessee River Bridge, a 1.88-mile-long (3.03 km) pair of bridges. The Interstate emerges again into the fringes of Decatur in an open area of seemingly "endless" cotton fields where it intersects, inside Decatur, with SR 20, U.S. Route 72 Alternate (US 72 Alt.), and the spur route I-565 to Huntsville.

Between Walkers Chapel Road in Fultondale and the Tennessee River in Decatur (Limestone County), I-65 has been designated the "Ronald Reagan Memorial Highway". The sign designating the north end of this portion of road cites Reagan's speech in Decatur on July 4, 1984. The Interstate then continues, passing Athens, and merges with US 31. The two routes travel concurrently approximately 12 miles (19 km) to the Tennessee state line.

Near the northern border of Alabama with Tennessee on southbound I-65 is located the Alabama Welcome Center and rest area. The unique feature of this rest area compared to others is the large Saturn IB rocket erected on the site as a memorial to Alabama's—and, in particular, Huntsville's—contribution to NASA's space exploration.

== History ==
The first section designed for the future Interstate Highway System spanned from the Tennessee border to Athens at US 31. It opened on November 15, 1958, and has a historical marker on the Tennessee side of the border. It was converted to full Interstate standards around 1970. The first section of Interstate in Alabama opened to traffic was the eight-mile (13 km) stretch of I-65 between northern Jefferson County and Warrior on December 10, 1959. A 26-mile (42 km) segment between US 31/SR 22 in Clanton and US 31 in Calera opened to traffic on March 23, 1961. On April 1, 1961, a 26-mile (42 km) section between north of Warrior and SR 69 near Cullman opened to traffic. On May 25, 1961, two segments of I-65, a 14-mile (23 km) segment from near Pine Level to US 31 near Clanton and a six-mile (9.7 km) segment between US 31 in Calera and US 31 in Alabaster, were opened. In Mobile, the 6.8-mile (10.9 km) section between US 90 and US 45 opened on January 4, 1963. The 11-mile (18 km) section between SR 70/US 72 Alt. (now also the western terminus of I-565) near Decatur and US 72 in Athens was dedicated and opened on June 28, 1973. Work on the Tennessee River bridges in Morgan and Limestone counties began in April 1969, and the bridges were dedicated and opened by Governor George Wallace on November 21, 1973, along with the entire 6-mile (9.7 km) section between SR 67 in Priceville and SR 20/US 72 Alt. On November 30, 1973, the 15-mile (24 km) section from south of I-85 in Montgomery and US 31 in Prattville, including the I-85 interchange, was dedicated and opened by Wallace.

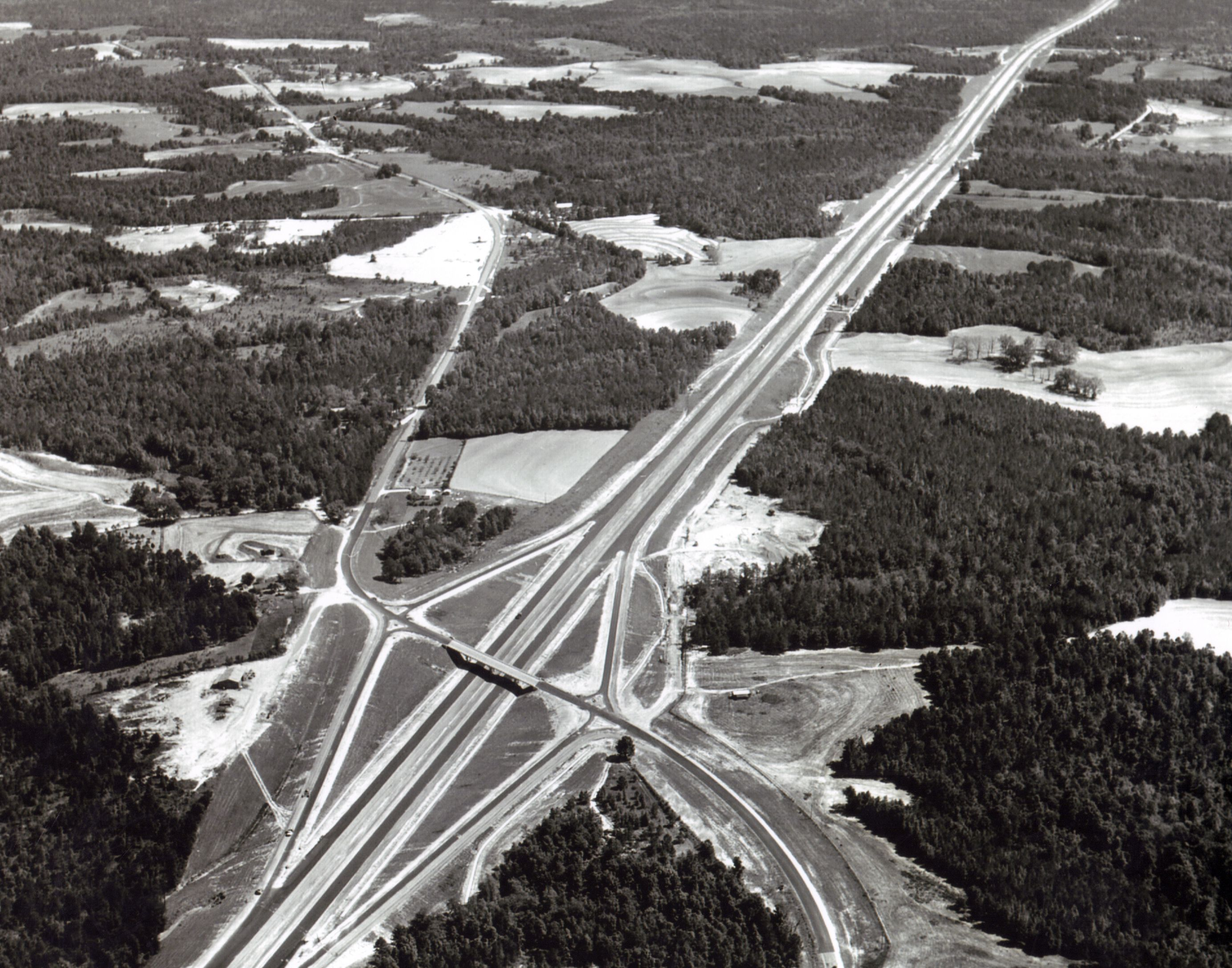
I-65 under construction in Escambia County in 1963

While most of I-65 in Alabama was completed in the 1960s, the last segments to be completed were some of the last segments to be completed on the entire Interstate Highway System. The 11.7-mile (18.8 km) section between Alabaster and Hoover opened on May 20, 1981. The first contracts for the construction of the 12-mile (19 km) segment between US 43 north of Mobile and SR 225 in Baldwin County, including the six-mile-long (9.7 km) General W.K. Wilson Jr. Bridge, were awarded in 1967, and the section was opened on October 2, 1981. At the time, this was the most expensive highway project in the state's history, costing $137 million (equivalent to $399 million in 2024). The last section to be completed was a 14-mile (23 km) section between Lewisberg and Warrior that opened on December 19, 1985, which replaced a four-lane section of US 31 that had been designated as part of I-65 but did not meet Interstate Highway standards.

In 1997, at Georgiana (exit 114), honoring legendary country musician and Alabama native Hank Williams, the Interstate was designated as Hank Williams's Memorial "Lost Highway", after one of his songs. This designation continues northward until mile 179 north of Montgomery. From the state's capital, I-65 doglegs northward, bypassing Prattville and Clanton before going through the Birmingham metropolitan area. From exits 238 to 290, this highway carries at least six lanes of traffic. A portion of the Interstate running through Birmingham has been nicknamed "Malfunction Junction" for its numerous wrecks. These accidents include two separate occasions of the support beams melting after crashes by 18-wheelers and the numerous collisions that happen every year, resulting from the junction with I-20 and I-59.

In 2004, following the death of former-President Ronald Reagan, a lengthy segment of I-65 from Jefferson County to Limestone County was designated the Ronald Reagan Memorial Highway. The sign designating the north end of the segment includes a statement from Reagan's speech at Point Mallard Park in nearby Decatur on July 4, 1984.

== Future ==
A few miles north of I-22 will be the new interchange (exit 274) between I-65 and I-422, which will be Corridor X-1 and has been designated as Interstate 422. This loop route will connect I-65 with I-59 northeast of Birmingham and I-20/I-59 southwest of Birmingham, and this will serve as an Interstate Highway bypass of Birmingham, augmenting the existing I-459, which already provides the southern loop of Birmingham. Construction of this interchange is still several years away, but right-of-way is in the process of being acquired to build I-422. I-65 will also be widened between exit 231 in Calera and exit 238 near Alabaster, which will include six bridges over rail tracks and two bridges. This project is expected to cost $300 million.

In the Birmingham–Hoover vicinity, a plan to widen the Interstate from North Birmingham to Alabaster has been proposed. The project is to widen the Interstate by adding an HOV lane and keeping the original three lanes making it four lanes in each direction. This is planned to stretch to the Pelham area. From there, the Interstate will widen from two lanes each way to three lanes each way into the Helena–Alabaster area.

== Exit list ==
County	Location	mi	km	Exit	Destinations	Notes
Mobile	Mobile	0.000	0.000	0	I-10 – Pascagoula, Pensacola	Southbound exit and northbound entrance; southern terminus; I-10 exit 20; directional T interchange
Mobile	Mobile	1.930	3.106	1	US 90 (SR 16 / Government Boulevard)	To Downtown Mobile
Mobile	Mobile	3.64	5.86	3	Airport Boulevard	Serves Mobile Regional Airport and University of South Alabama
Mobile	Mobile	4.48	7.21	4	Dauphin Street	
Mobile	Mobile	5.56	8.95	5A	Springhill Avenue	Serves Spring Hill College
Mobile	Mobile	5.752	9.257	5B	US 98 (SR 42 / Moffett Road)	
Mobile	Prichard	8.412	13.538	8	US 45 (SR 17 / St. Stephens Road) – Prichard, Citronelle, Butler, Meridian	
Mobile	Prichard	9.640	15.514	9	I-165 south – Prichard, Downtown Mobile	I-165 exit 0 northbound; tri-stack interchange
Mobile	Chickasaw	10.616	17.085	10	West Lee Street	
Mobile	Saraland	13.067	21.029	13	SR 158 (Industrial Parkway) / SR 213 – Eight Mile, Saraland, Citronelle	
Mobile	Saraland	17.397	27.998	15	CR 41 (Celeste Road) – Saraland, Citronelle	
Mobile	Creola	19.495	31.374	19	US 43 (SR 13) – Satsuma, Creola, Thomasville, Demopolis	
Mobile		21.505	34.609	22	Sailor Road – Creola	
Mobile River; Tensaw River		24.220	38.978	General W.K. Wilson Jr. Bridge		
Baldwin		31.793	51.166	31	SR 225 – Stockton, Spanish Fort	
Baldwin		33.935	54.613	34	SR 59 – Bay Minette, Stockton	
Baldwin		37.724	60.711	37	SR 287 (Gulf Shores Parkway) – Bay Minette, Rabun	Two-lane on-ramp for I-65 north towards Montgomery
Baldwin		45.044	72.491	45	Rabun, Perdido	
Escambia		53.574	86.219	54	CR 1 (Jack Springs Road)	
Escambia		57.656	92.788	57	SR 21 – Atmore, Uriah	To Pensacola
Escambia	Barnett Crossroads	69.356	111.618	69	SR 113 – Flomaton, Wallace CR 40	To Pensacola
Conecuh		77.402	124.566	77	SR 41 – Brewton, Repton	
Conecuh		83.372	134.174	83	CR 7 – Castleberry, Lenox	
Conecuh	Evergreen, Conecuh County	92.930	149.556	93	US 84 (SR 12) – Evergreen, Conecuh County, Monroeville	
Conecuh	Evergreen, Conecuh County	96.509	155.316	96	SR 83 – Evergreen, Conecuh County, Midway	
Conecuh		100.685	162.037	101	CR 29 – Owassa	
Butler		107.345	172.755	107	Hank Williams Road – Grace, Garland	
Butler		113.969	183.415	114	SR 106 – Georgiana, Starlington	
Butler	Greenville	127.661	205.450	128	SR 10 (Pineapple Highway) – Greenville, Pine Apple, Butler, Meridian	Southern end of SR 10 Truck overlap
Butler	Greenville	130.046	209.289	130	SR 185 / SR 10 Truck east – Greenville	Northern end of SR 10 Truck overlap
Lowndes		141.531	227.772	142	SR 185 – Fort Deposit, Logan	
Lowndes		151.108	243.185	151	SR 97 – Letohatchee, Davenport	
Lowndes		157.628	253.678	158	To US 31 (SR 3, Tyson Road) – Pintlala, Tyson	
Montgomery		163.792	263.598	164	US 31 (SR 3) – Pintlala, Hope Hull	Serves Hyundai Motor Company's Montgomery Plant
Montgomery	Montgomery			166	I-85 – Atlanta, Meridian	Future southern terminus of Montgomery bypass
Montgomery	Montgomery	167.103	268.926	167	US 80 west (SR 8 west) – Selma, Demopolis	Southern end of US 80/SR 8 overlap
Montgomery	Montgomery	168.213	270.713	168	US 80 east / US 82 east (SR 6 east / SR 8 east / SR 21 / South Boulevard) to US 231 (SR 53) / US 331 (SR 9)	Northern end of US 80/SR 8 overlap; southern end of US 82/SR 6 overlap
Montgomery	Montgomery	169.513	272.805	169	Edgemont Avenue	Southbound exit and northbound entrance
Montgomery	Montgomery	170.093	273.738	170	Fairview Avenue	
Montgomery	Montgomery	171.157	275.450	171	I-85 / Day Street – Atlanta	I-85 no number signed; complete access to I-85, southbound exit and northbound entrance only to Day Street
Montgomery	Montgomery	171.748– 171.824	276.402– 276.524	172	Herron Street, Clay Street – Downtown Montgomery	
Montgomery	Montgomery	172.013	276.828	Bridge over the Alabama River		
Montgomery	Montgomery	172.725	277.974	173	To US 231 (North Boulevard)	Unsigned SR 152
Elmore	Millbrook	175.535	282.496	176	SR 143 – Millbrook, Coosada	Northbound exit and southbound entrance
Elmore	Millbrook–Prattville city line	178.961	288.010	179	US 82 west (SR 6 west, Cobbs Ford Road) / SR 14 west / Montgomery Toll Road – Millbrook, Prattville	Northern end of US 82/SR 6 overlap; southern end of SR 14 overlap
Elmore	Prattville	181.282	291.745	181	SR 14 east – Prattville, Wetumpka	Northern end of SR 14 overlap
Autauga	Prattville	186.426	300.024	186	US 31 (SR 3) – Pine Level, Prattville	
Chilton		200.366	322.458	200	Verbena	
Chilton	Clanton	205.340	330.463	205	US 31 / SR 22 (SR 3) – Clanton, Verbena	
Chilton	Clanton	208.35	335.31	208	Lake Mitchell Road – Clanton, Lake Mitchell	
Chilton	Clanton	211.876	340.981	212	SR 145 (Lay Dam Road) – Clanton, Lay Dam	Peach Tower exit
Chilton		219.256	352.858	219	Jemison, Thorsby	
Shelby	Calera	228.380	367.542	228	SR 25 (Main Street) – Montevallo, Calera	
Shelby	Calera	231.206	372.090	231	US 31 (SR 3) – Saginaw, Calera, Montevallo	
Shelby	Calera	233.976	376.548	234	Shelby County Airport	
Shelby		238.321	383.540	238	US 31 (SR 3, 1st Street) – Alabaster, Saginaw	
Shelby	Pelham	241.841	389.205	242	CR 52 – Pelham, Helena	
Shelby	Pelham	246.062	395.998	246	SR 119 (Cahaba Valley Road)	
Shelby	Hoover	247.262	397.930	247	CR 17 (Valleydale Road)	
Jefferson	Hoover	250.083	402.470	250	I-459 – Atlanta, Gadsden, Tuscaloosa	I-459 exit 15
Jefferson	Hoover	251.967	405.502	252	US 31 (Montgomery Highway/SR 3)	
Jefferson	Hoover	253.697	408.286	254	Alford Avenue	
Jefferson	Homewood	255.087	410.523	255	Lakeshore Parkway	
Jefferson	Homewood	256.117	412.180	256	Oxmoor Road – Homewood	Signed as exits 256A (west) and 256B (east) southbound
Jefferson	Birmingham	257.557	414.498	258	Green Springs Avenue	
Jefferson	Birmingham	258.827– 258.957	416.542– 416.751	259A	University Boulevard (northbound); 6th Avenue South (southbound)	Signed as exit 259 northbound
Jefferson	Birmingham	259.127	417.024	259B	4th Avenue South & 3rd Avenue South	Southbound exit (4th Avenue) and northbound entrance (3rd Avenue)
Jefferson	Birmingham	259.697– 259.937	417.942– 418.328	260	US 11 (US 78/SR 4 east/SR 7, 3rd Avenue North) / 6th Avenue North – Downtown Birmingham	Signed as exit 260B northbound
Jefferson	Birmingham	260.562	419.334	261	I-20 / I-59 – Gadsden, Atlanta, Tuscaloosa	Signed as exits 261B (east/north) and 261C (west/south); I-20/59 exits 124B-C; hybrid interchange
Jefferson	Birmingham	261.369	420.633	262A	16th Street	Northbound exit and southbound entrance
Jefferson	Birmingham	261.952	421.571	262B	Finley Boulevard (SR 378)	
Jefferson	Birmingham	262.611– 262.685	422.631– 422.751	263	32nd Avenue (northbound); 33rd Avenue (southbound)	
Jefferson	Birmingham	263.462	424.001	264	Daniel Payne Drive/Lewisburg Road	Ramp to I-65 north also connects to I-22 west
Jefferson	Fultondale	264.010	424.883	265A	I-22 west – Jasper, Memphis	Eastern terminus of I-22; I-22 exit 95
Jefferson	Fultondale	264.997	426.471	265B	US 31 (SR 3) – Fultondale	
Jefferson	Fultondale	266.61	429.07	267	Walker Chapel Road	
Jefferson	Gardendale	269.76	434.14	271	Fieldstown Road	
Jefferson	Gardendale	271.29	436.60	272	Mt. Olive Road	
Jefferson	Morris			274	I-422	Proposed interchange; future I-422
Jefferson		274.72	442.12	275	To US 31 (SR 3, Barber Road) – Morris	
Jefferson	Warrior	279.46	449.75	280	To US 31 (SR 3, Service Road) – Warrior	
Jefferson	Warrior	280.48	451.39	281	Old US 31 – Warrior	
Jefferson	Warrior	281.24	452.61	282	Cane Creek Road – Robbins, Warrior	
Blount	Smoke Rise	284.361	457.635	284	US 31 south (SR 3 south) / SR 160 east – Hayden, Corner	Southern end of US 31/SR 3 overlap
Blount	Smoke Rise	287.370	462.477	287	US 31 north (SR 3 north, Bee Line Highway) – Garden City, Blount Springs	Northern end of US 31/SR 3 overlap
Blount		289.33	465.63	289	Empire, Blount Springs	
Cullman		291.861	469.705	291	SR 91 – Hanceville, Colony	
Cullman		299.446	481.912	299	SR 69 south / CR 490 – Jasper, Dodge City	Southern end of SR 69 overlap
Cullman		303.490	488.420	304	SR 69 north / CR 437 – Cullman, Good Hope	Northern end of SR 69 overlap
Cullman	Good Hope	307.55	494.95	305	CR 222 (Good Hope Road)	
Cullman	Cullman	307.464	494.815	308	US 278 (SR 74) – Cullman, Double Springs	
Cullman	Cullman	310.039	498.959	310	SR 157 (Section Line Road) – Cullman, Moulton	
Morgan		318.161	512.030	318	US 31 (SR 3, 2nd Avenue) – Lacon, Vinemont	
Morgan		321.855	517.975	322	Pike Road – Falkville, Eva	
Morgan	Hartselle	324.938	522.937	325	Thompson Road	
Morgan	Hartselle	327.474	527.018	328	SR 36 (Main Street) – Hartselle	
Morgan	Decatur–Priceville city line	333.337	536.454	334	SR 67 – Decatur, Priceville, Somerville	
Wheeler Lake; Tennessee River		336.619	541.736	Interstate 65 Tennessee River Bridge		
Limestone	Huntsville	340.002	547.180	340	I-565 east / SR 20 west (US 72 Alt.) – Huntsville, Decatur	Signed as exits 340A (west) and 340B (east) southbound; I-565 exit 1 westbound & 1A-B eastbound; eastern terminus of SR 20; western terminus of I-565
Limestone	Tanner	347.412	559.105	347	CR 24 – Tanner	
Limestone	Athens	351.024	564.918	351	US 72 (SR 2) – Athens, Huntsville	
Limestone	Athens	354.157	569.960	354	US 31 south (SR 3 south) – Athens	Southern end of US 31 overlap; unsigned northern terminus of SR 3
Limestone	Elkmont	360.918	580.841	361	CR 100 – Thach, Elkmont	
Limestone		364.826	587.131	365	SR 53 south (Upper Elkton Road, 7th Street) / CR 81 – Ardmore	Northern terminus of SR 53
Limestone		366.229	589.388		I-65 north / US 31 north – Nashville	Continuation into Tennessee
1.000 mi = 1.609 km; 1.000 km = 0.621 mi: Concurrency terminus; Incomplete access; Unopened

== See also ==
Interstate 65
Previous state: Terminus	Alabama	Next state: Tennessee
