= Rabun (disambiguation) =

Rabun may refer to:

- Rabun, a 2003 Malaysian drama film
- Rabun, Alabama, an unincorporated community in Baldwin County, Alabama
- Rabun County, the north-easternmost county in the U.S. state of Georgia
