= Interstate 165 (Alabama) =

Highway in Alabama

Interstate 165
- I-165 highlighted in red

Route information
- Auxiliary route of I-65
- Maintained by ALDOT
- Length: 5.070 mi (8.159 km)
- Existed: 1994–present
- NHS: Entire route

Major junctions
- South end: Water Street in Mobile
- US 90 / US 98 Truck in Mobile
- North end: I-65 in Prichard

Location
- Country: United States
- State: Alabama
- Counties: Mobile

Highway system
- Interstate Highway System; Main; Auxiliary; Suffixed; Business; Future; Alabama State Highway System; Interstate; US; State
← SR 164	→ SR 165

Interstate 165 (I-165) is a spur from I-65 that provides access to Mobile, Alabama. It travels for approximately 5.07 miles (8.16 km) from Water Street in downtown Mobile north to I-65 in Prichard. As it is, I-165 terminates into Water Street, which itself terminates into an I-10 onramp less than two miles (3.2 km) further. The route is elevated for its entire length.

== Route description ==
I-165 begins at its northern terminus, an interchange with I-65. After that is an incomplete interchange (exit 1A) with Whistler Street and Price Avenue that is only accessible from the southbound lanes. It then has an incomplete interchange (exit 1B) with Wilson Avenue and Dr. Martin Luther King Jr. Drive that is only accessible from the southbound lanes. Shortly afterward, I-165 meets an incomplete interchange (exit 1C) with Price Avenue and Whistler Street that is only accessible from the northbound lanes. I-165 then meets U.S. Route 90 (US 90)/U.S. Route 98 Truck (US 98 Truck) at exit 2 on the Mobile–Prichard city line, and then the three highways curve concurrently to the south-southeast. It then has an incomplete interchange that leads to Conception Street Road. It is only accessible from the northbound lanes. Finally, I-165 reaches Beauregard Street, its southern terminus, where US 90/US 98 Truck split off. This interchange also includes Water Street, with leads to I-10.

== History ==
Interstate 210
- Location: Mobile–Prichard

I-165 began life as a planned Interstate 210 (I-210). Many problems, including community opposition and access to the Mobile waterfront, prevented the freeway from reaching its intended southern terminus at I-10; I-165 ends about one mile (1.6 km) short of I-10 and becomes Water Street. Since the road had no connection to I-10, the number 210 was no longer applicable to the freeway(because the last 2 digits of the spur numbers is the number of the main route), so 165 was chosen instead.

Construction of the freeway commenced in early 1991 and was originally slated for opening in April 1995. Costing $240 million (equivalent to $459 million in 2024) to complete, the route was officially opened to the public at 5:00 pm on October 28, 1994. In attendance at the ceremony were former governor Jim Folsom Jr., US Representative Sonny Callahan, and Federal Highway Administration head Rodney Slate. Upon its completion, it saved commuters traveling between downtown Mobile and the northern suburbs along I-65 an average of nine minutes. While still under construction in 1993, efforts to name the freeway in honor of Mobile baseball great Satchel Paige never materialized.

Its construction resulted in the demolition of many structures within downtown Prichard, including such landmarks as the main public library and fire station.

== Exit list ==
The entire route is in Mobile County.

Location	mi	km	Exit	Destinations	Notes
Prichard	0.000	0.000	1A-B	I-65 – Mobile, Montgomery	Northern terminus; northbound exit and southbound entrance; signed as exits 1A (south) and 1B (north); I-65 exit 9
Prichard	0.9– 2.1	1.4– 3.4	1A	Whistler Street	Southbound exit and northbound entrance
Prichard	0.9– 2.1	1.4– 3.4	1B	Price Avenue / Wilson Avenue / Dr. M.L. King Jr. Drive	Southbound exit and northbound entrance
Prichard	0.9– 2.1	1.4– 3.4	1C	Wilson Avenue / Price Avenue / Whistler Street	Northbound exit and southbound entrance
Prichard	2.524	4.062	2	US 90 east / US 98 Truck east (Bay Bridge Road) to I-10 / Dr. M.L. King Drive	Northern end of US 90/US 98 Truck concurrency
Mobile	5.0	8.0	—	To Conception Street Road	Northbound exit and southbound entrance
Mobile	5.070	8.159	—	US 90 west / US 98 Truck west (Beauregard Street) to US 98 – State Docks	Southern terminus; at-grade intersection; southern end of US 90/US 98 Truck concurrency
Mobile				Water Street to I-10	Continuation beyond Beauregard Street
Mobile				I-10 – Florida, Mississippi	Former proposed interchange
1.000 mi = 1.609 km; 1.000 km = 0.621 mi: Closed/former; Concurrency terminus; Incomplete access
