= Blount Springs, Alabama =

Unincorporated community in Alabama, United States

- Unincorporated community
- Location within Alabama Location within the United States
- Coordinates: 33°55′52″N 86°47′39″W
- Country: United States
- State: Alabama
- County: Blount
- Elevation: 456 ft (139 m)
- Time zone: UTC-6 (Central (CST))
  - Summer (DST): UTC-5 (CDT)
- Area codes: 205, 659
- GNIS feature ID: 114507

Blount Springs is an unincorporated community in Blount County, Alabama United States.

== Geography ==
The community is located three miles east of Interstate 65, approximately 28 miles (45 km) north of Birmingham and 28 miles south of Cullman.

== History ==
Blount Springs's mineral springs and rural setting made it a summer resort for thousands of wealthy people from Alabama, Tennessee, Georgia, Mississippi, Louisiana, and more from 1820 to the 1930s. The sulfur springs were renowned for their curative properties. More than the health benefits, Old Blount became known for its social scene as the gentry of the Black Belt and later the City of Birmingham took advantage of the cooler temperatures of the area during the heat and malarial conditions of late summer.

The Goff House and Duffee House were antebellum hotels of renown there. Col. J. F. B. Jackson built a resort hotel, the Jackson House, in 1872 around the sulfur springs. In 1887, Jackson sold the land and hotel to James Sloss and his brother, Mack Sloss, who renamed it Blount Springs Hotel.

Besides hotels, cottages were available for guest use as well as horseback riding, gambling- via card games, slot machines, and roulette wheels- (permitted by state law only at water places), ten pins and plenty of spirits. Many of the regulars owned their own cottages and spent every season (July through October) at the springs. Visitors to the springs occasionally made the four-mile trip to the northeast to visit the nearby Bangor Cave.

Celebrities and important people visited and politicians galore spoke and vacationed there. Governors of several states, Senators and other office holders and seekers were constantly visiting. Teddy Roosevelt once made an appearance. One of the largest stars of the day, Lillian Russell, came for an extended visit and created quite a stir after she enjoyed a day of sunbathing and was covered in chigger bites. It took every ounce of butter in the town and surrounding countryside to sooth the most famous body in the country. Diamond Jim Brady, New York restaurateur and gentleman friend of Miss Russell, also accompanied her on the trip.

Eventually though the Louisville and Nashville Railroad rerouted in November 1914, and the new tracks bypassed Blount Springs. The resort burned down on June 3, 1915, after a fire started in the kitchen of the main hotel and it also burned much of the town. The fire marked the end of the resort and the town, combined with the changing of the railroad so that it didn't go through town anymore and the easy access to other entertainments. Those that owned cottages and a few others still came for the next several years. There was an attempt to locate a Veteran's Hospital that failed. Other development plans by members of the Drennen family for a large village and resurgence of the springs never came to fruition. Blount Springs became sparsely populated and largely undeveloped for several decades.

In the late 1980s, Blount Springs Recolonization Partners began work on The Village at Blount Springs, the first stage of a 6,000-acre (24 km^{2}) planned gated community designed by Duany, Plater-Zyberk architects on the former site of the Blount Springs resort.

Numerous springs emerge at the site of the former resort, each containing a different mineral (white sulfur, red sulfur, and lithium, to name a few). When the resort was still in operation, water from the springs was sold in blue glass bottles. Shards of these bottles fill the soil near the foundations of the resort, and are said to bring good luck.

A post office operated under the name Blount Springs from 1830 to 1957.

== Demographics ==
Historical population
Census	Pop.	Note	%±
1880	156		—
U.S. Decennial Census

Blount Springs appeared on the 1880 U.S. Census as an incorporated town having 156 residents. It was the only time it appeared on census rolls.
