= U.S. Route 45 in Alabama =

U.S. Highway in Alabama

U.S. Route 45
- US 45 highlighted in red

Route information
- Maintained by ALDOT
- Length: 59.181 mi (95.243 km)

Major junctions
- South end: US 98 in Mobile
- I-65 in Prichard; SR 17 north of Deer Park
- North end: US 45 near State Line, MS

Location
- Country: United States
- State: Alabama
- Counties: Mobile, Washington

Highway system
- United States Numbered Highway System; List; Special; Divided; Alabama State Highway System; Interstate; US; State
← SR 44	US 45	→ SR 46
← SR 56	SR 57	→ I-59

In the U.S. state of Alabama, U.S. Route 45 (US 45) is a 60-mile-long (97 km) north–south United States Highway in the east south central state of Alabama. It travels from Mobile to the Mississippi state line, just east of State Line, Mississippi. The highway's southern terminus is in Mobile, at an intersection with US 98. Its northern terminus in the state of Alabama is at the Mississippi state line.

In Alabama, all of the U.S. Highways have one or more unsigned state highways designated along its length. US 45 travels concurrently with State Route 17 (SR 17) from its southern terminus to just north of Deer Park. For the rest of its length in the state, the highway travels concurrently with State Route 57 (SR 57).

== Route description ==
US 45 begins at the intersection of St. Stephens Road and Spring Hill Avenue west of downtown Mobile. Spring Hill Avenue carries US 98 to the east and west while St. Stephens Road heads to the northwest through the city and into Prichard. There lies an interchange with Interstate 65 (I-65). Further north in the Eight Mile neighborhood, it intersects the southern ends of SR 213 and SR 217 in quick succession. The highway then meets SR 158 at an interchange near the University of Mobile. It curves to the north and northwest as it travels through Mauvilla, Chunchula, and Citronelle. US 45 continues to the northwest, through rural Washington County. Just north of Deer Park, SR 17 splits off to the northeast toward Chatom at a Y intersection. The highway curves back to the northwest and goes through Fruitdale and later Yellow Pine. It continues to the north-northwest and crosses into Mississippi.

== History ==
=== 1910s and 1920s ===
The road that would become US 45 in Alabama was designated at least as early as 1914. This road traveled in Mobile and Prichard as an "improved hard surface road" (macadam, gravel, chert) and from Prichard to Citronelle as an "improved soil road". There was also a segment from about Deer Park to Yellow Pine as an "unimproved road". By 1925, the roadway was entirely built in the state. It was designated as SR 28, and it is an "existing road upon which state has done no work". That year, US 45 was designated along its entire length in the state. The entire highway was an "existing road upon which the state has done no work" except for a segment from just north of Gulfcrest to Fruitdale, which was indicated to be graded. By 1928, the segment from Mobile to just north of Gulfcrest was indicated to be "unimproved", while the segment from Fruitdale to the Mississippi state line was indicated to be graded, in addition to the Gulfcrest-to-Fruitdale segment. Also, SR 57 was designated along the entire length of the highway.

=== 1930s ===
By 1930, the highway was indicated to have a "hard surface" in Mobile and Citronelle; a gravel/chert or a sand-clay/topsoil surface from Mobile to Citronelle; and "graded" from Citronelle to the Mississippi state line. Later that year, the entire Mobile County segment was indicated to have a "hard surface". The entire Washington County segment was indicated to have been graded. By the end of 1934, US 43, along with SR 5 were designated in Mobile, but the state maps are unclear as to whether they traveled concurrently with US 45/SR 57. By 1935, the entire Mobile County segment was indicated to have a "pavement" surface. The entire Washington County segment was indicated to have a "gravel or chert" surface. By 1939, the highway was indicated to be under construction from the Mobile–Washington county line to about Fruitdale.

=== 1940s to 1980s ===
By 1941, the highway was indicated to be under construction from just southeast of Fruitdale to just northwest of Yellow Pine. By 1942, US 45 was indicated to be paved for its entire length in the state. By 1952, SR 57 was decommissioned south of the Deer Park area. It was replaced by SR 17, as it exists today. By 1957, SR 5, which was concurrent with US 43 in Mobile was truncated farther north. It was replaced by SR 13. However, it was still not clear whether US 43 and SR 13 were concurrent with US 45 in the city. By 1983, US 43 and SR 13 were moved off of US 45 and SR 17 in Mobile.

== Future ==
State legislatures in both Mississippi and Alabama have called for US 45 to be expanded to four-lanes along its entire length in Alabama. Although mentioned by ALDOT, this project has been shelved for now.

== Major intersections ==
County	Location	mi	km	Destinations	Notes
Mobile	Mobile	0.000	0.000	US 98 (SR 42 / Springhill Avenue) – Semmes, Spanish Fort	Southern end of SR 17 overlap
Mobile	Prichard	4.340	6.985	I-65 to I-10 – Montgomery	I-65 exit 8
Mobile	Prichard	6.297	10.134	SR 213 north (South Shelton Beach Road) – University of Mobile, Chickasabogue Park	
Mobile	Prichard	6.477	10.424	SR 217 north (Lott Road)	
Mobile	Prichard	9.618	15.479	SR 158 (Industrial Parkway) to I-65 – Saraland	Interchange
Washington		43.054	69.289	SR 17 north (Jordan Street) / SR 57 begins – Chatom	Northern end of SR 17 overlap; southern end of SR 57 overlap
Washington		59.181	95.243	US 45 north / SR 57 ends – State Line, Quitman, Meridian	Continuation into Mississippi; northern end of SR 57 overlap
1.000 mi = 1.609 km; 1.000 km = 0.621 mi: Concurrency terminus

== See also ==
U.S. Route 45
Previous state: Terminus	Alabama	Next state: Mississippi
