= Saginaw, Alabama =

Saginaw
- Unincorporated community
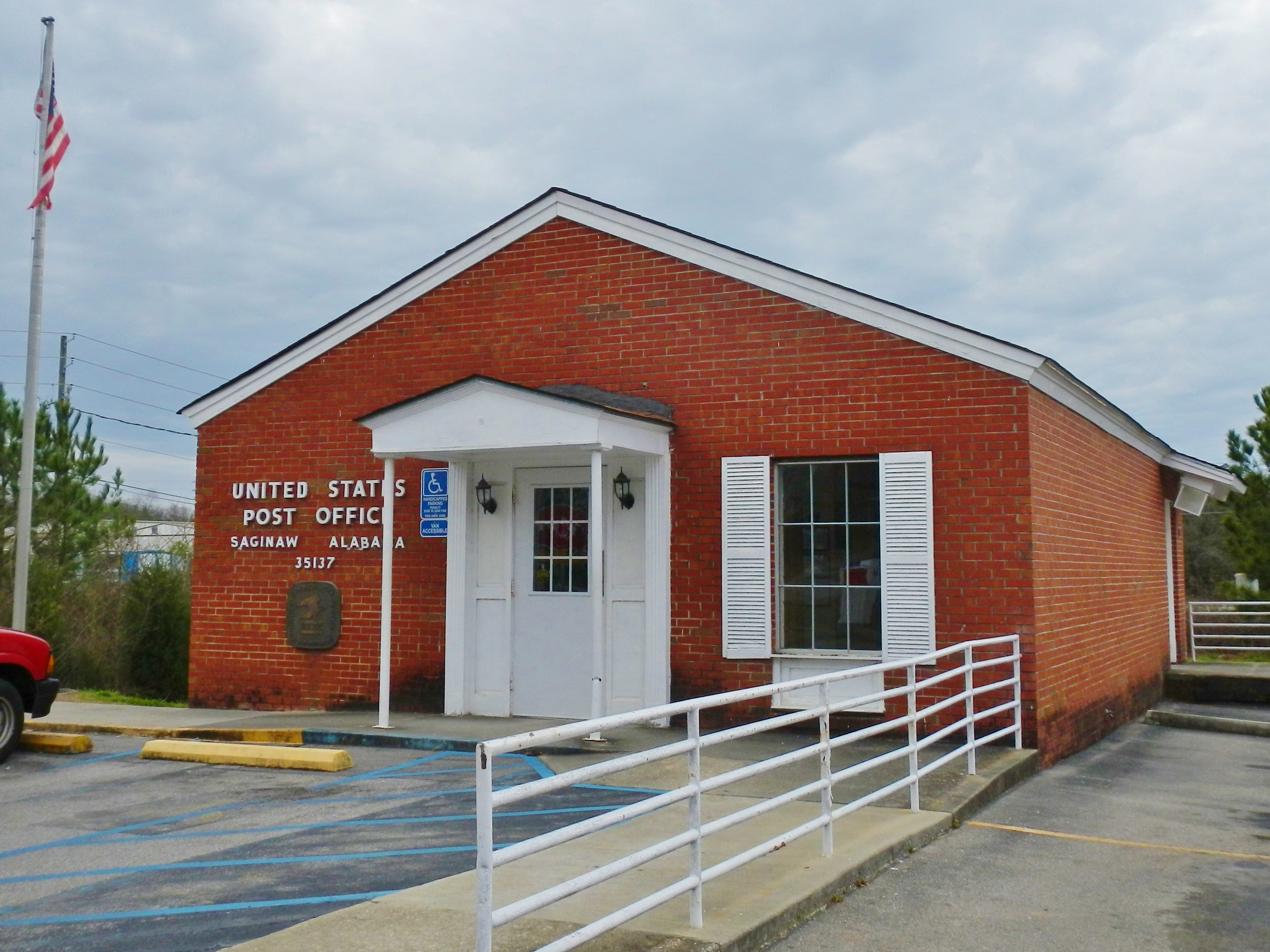
- Post Office in Saginaw

- Location within the state of Alabama Saginaw (the United States)
- Coordinates: 33°12′58″N 86°47′31″W
- Country: United States
- State: Alabama
- County: Shelby
- Elevation: 545 ft (166 m)
- Time zone: UTC-6 (Central (CST))
  - Summer (DST): UTC-5 (CDT)
- ZIP codes: 35137
- GNIS feature ID: 126076

Saginaw is an unincorporated community 2.5 miles north of Calera in Shelby County, Alabama, United States with zip code 35137. It is part of the Birmingham-Hoover-Cullman Combined Statistical Area. It is located southeast of Alabaster on the east side of Interstate 65 at the intersection of State Route 70 and U.S. Route 31.

Saginaw is the home of the Saginaw Pipe Company, Inc., a major supplier of steel pipe, beams, tubing, and plate, and Carmeuse Lime & Stone's Longview Operation (formerly Dravo Lime Company), a limestone quarry and calcining plant.

== Demographics ==
=== 2000 Census data ===
The U.S. Census bureau does not keep separate statistics for Saginaw. As of the census of 2000, for Block Group 2, Census Tract 306.09, Shelby County, Alabama, which is the census block group that includes the center of Saginaw, the total population was 1,684 people, with a racial makeup of 97.1% white, 2.2% black, and 0.7% mixed or other races.
