= Verbena, Alabama =

- Unincorporated community
- Location within the state of Alabama Verbena, Alabama (the United States)
- Coordinates: 32°45′10″N 86°30′43″W
- Country: United States
- State: Alabama
- County: Chilton
- Elevation: 482 ft (147 m)
- Time zone: UTC-6 (Central (CST))
  - Summer (DST): UTC-5 (CDT)
- Area codes: 205, 659
- GNIS feature ID: 153838

- Verbena
- U.S. National Register of Historic Places
- U.S. Historic district
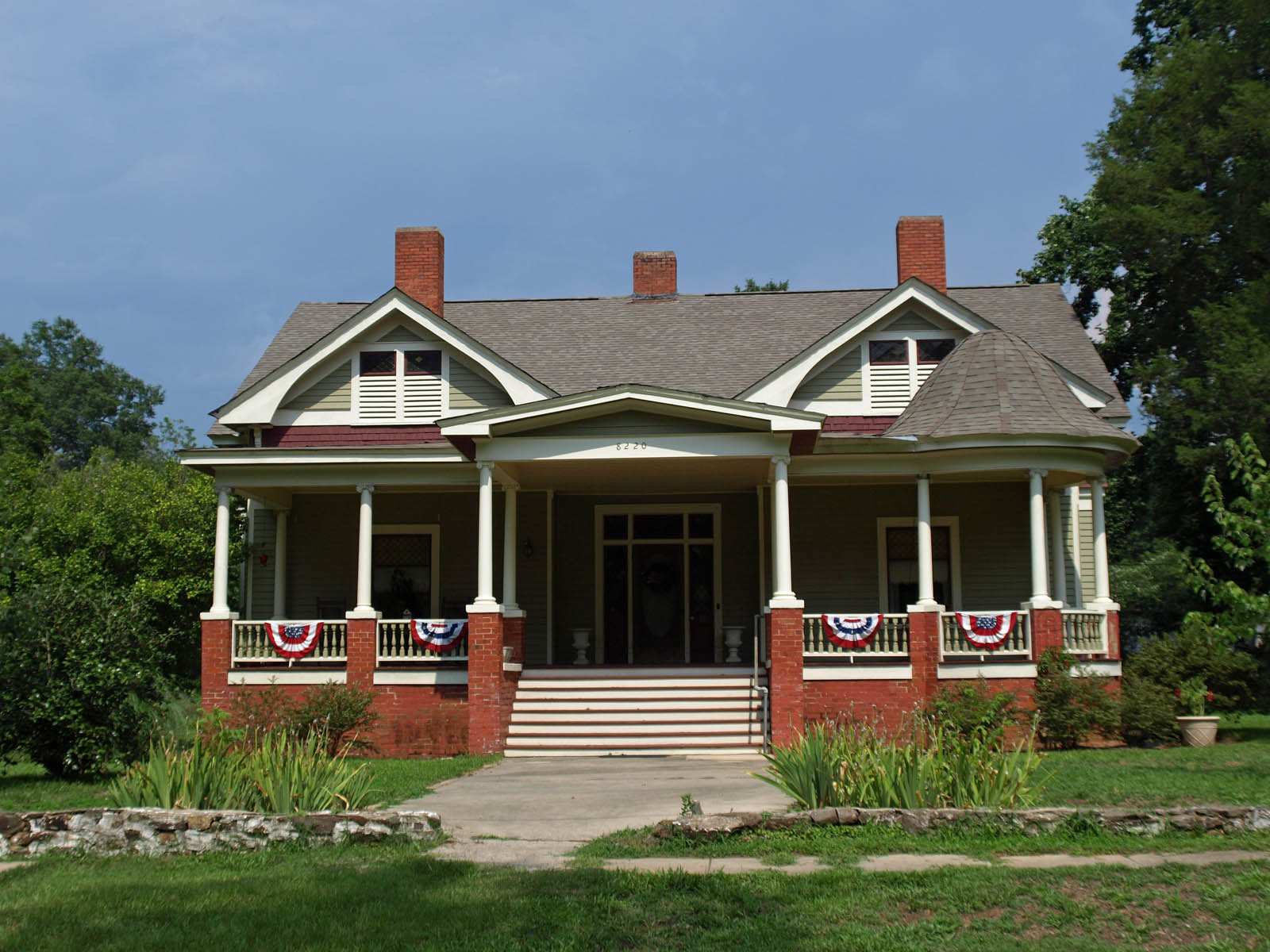
- Summerfield, one of several early houses in Verbena
- Built: 1873
- NRHP reference No.: 76002238
- Added to NRHP: January 19, 1976

Verbena, also known as Summerfield, is an unincorporated community in southeastern Chilton County, Alabama, United States. Named for the indigenous flower, Verbena developed into a popular resort location for the more affluent citizenry of Montgomery, the state's capital, during the yellow fever outbreaks of the late 19th and early 20th centuries. Many stately homes, some of which have undergone recent renovation and restoration, line the streets of the town as a reminder of this historic past.

The town was built beside the railroad currently owned by CSX Transportation. In its heyday, Verbena had two hotels, a bank, a post office, and a general store. Many of those buildings are gone or boarded up today, but the Verbena United Methodist Church still stands on County Road 59 near the town's center.

According to the U.S. Census in 1890, Verbena showed a population of 756, making it the largest community in Chilton County at that time.

== Modern era ==
Today, Verbena is a quiet community on the outskirts of Clanton. The town is located on U.S. Route 31 four miles south of Interstate 65 exit 205. It has a USPS Post Office (ZIP Code 36091), several small specialty stores, and numerous churches. The local school is Verbena High School (K5-12), home of the Red Devils. The community is served by the Chilton County Sheriff's Department and Verbena Volunteer Fire and Rescue.

Other communities in the area that are typically considered to be a part of Verbena are Cooper (pronounced "Coopers" by many locals), Enterprise (not to be confused with the city of Enterprise in South Alabama), and Midway.

The town is listed on the National Register of Historic Places.

== Gallery ==
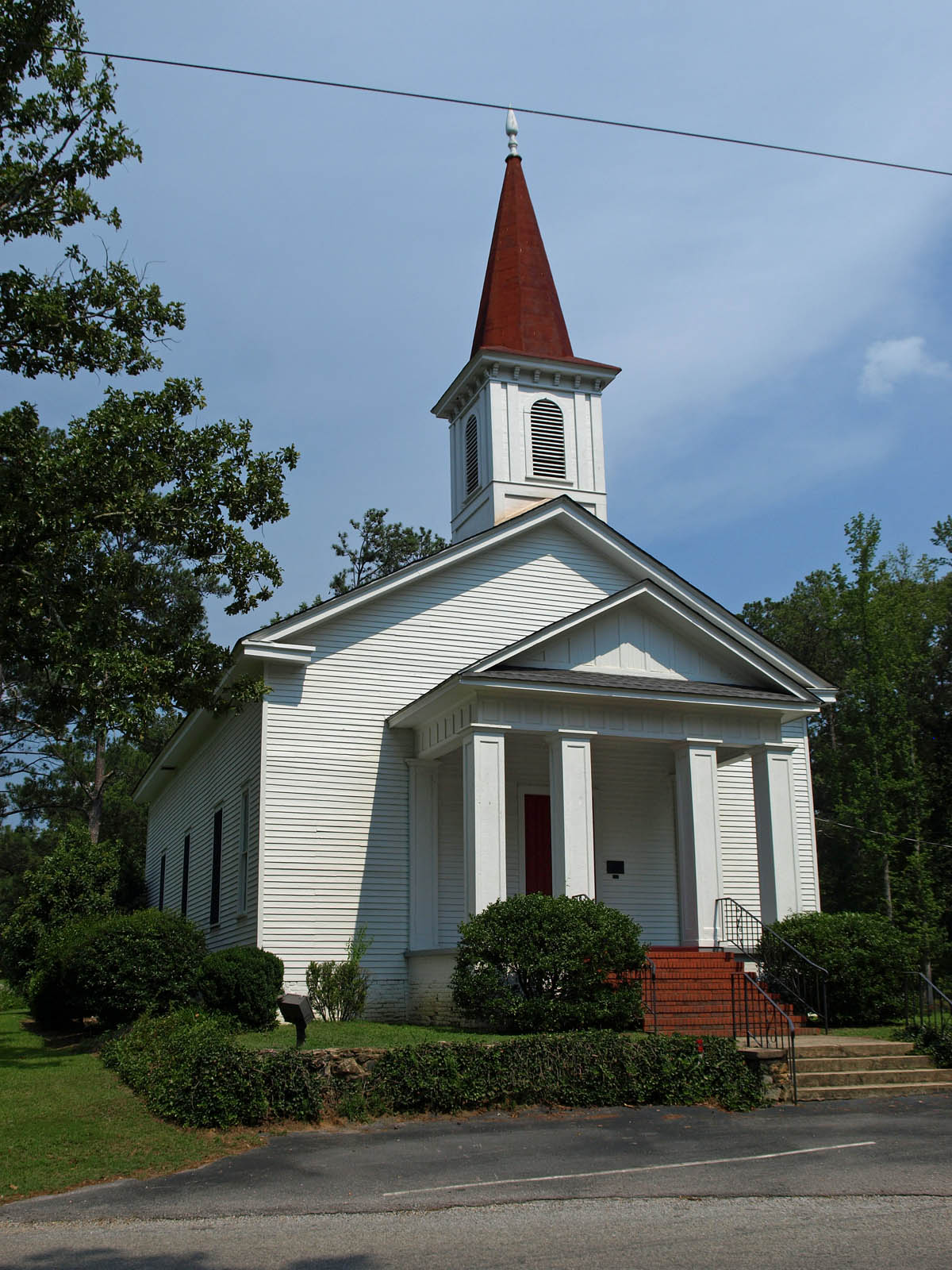
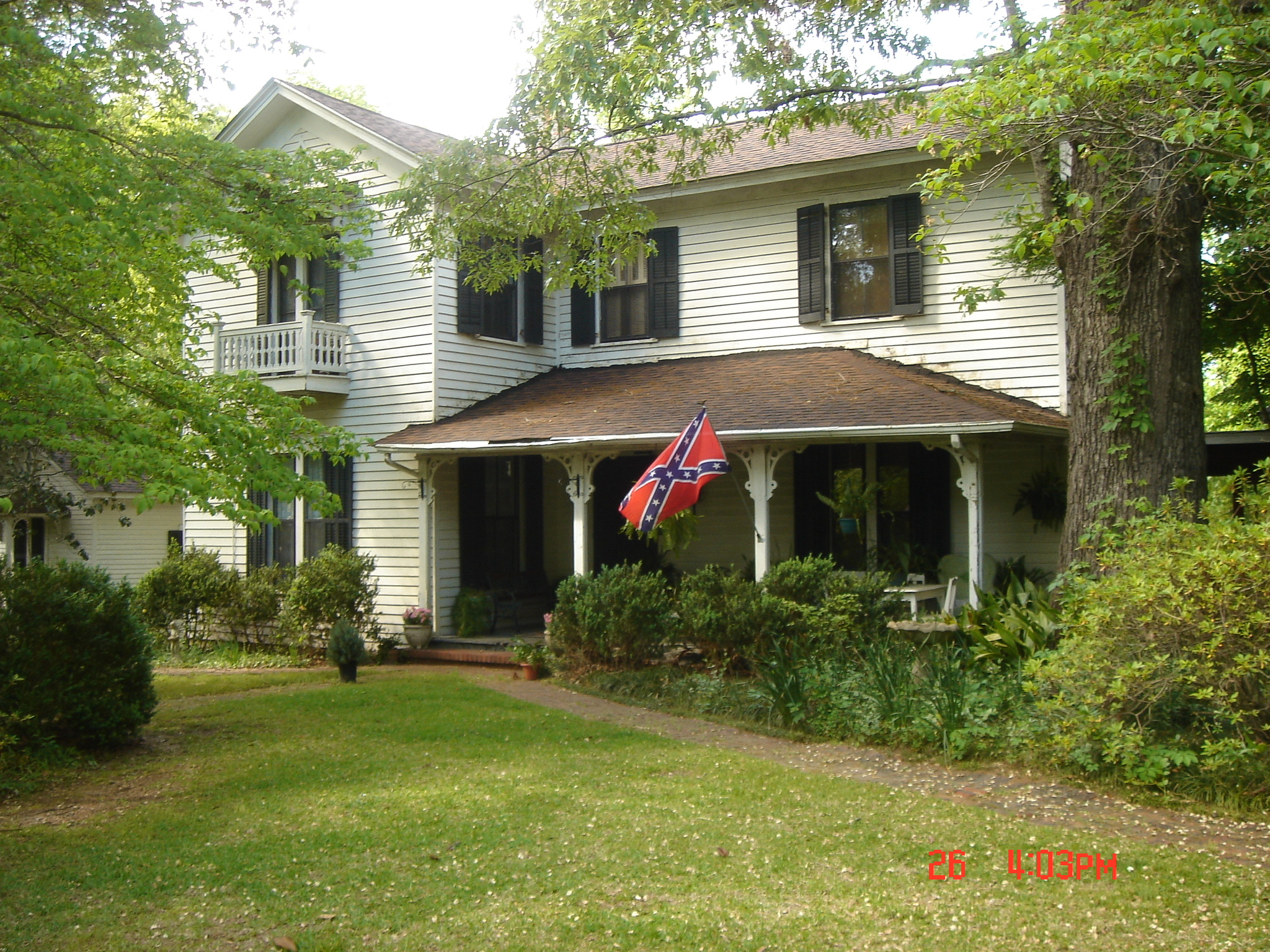
Barrett Shepard Thacker House
Verbena United Methodist Church.

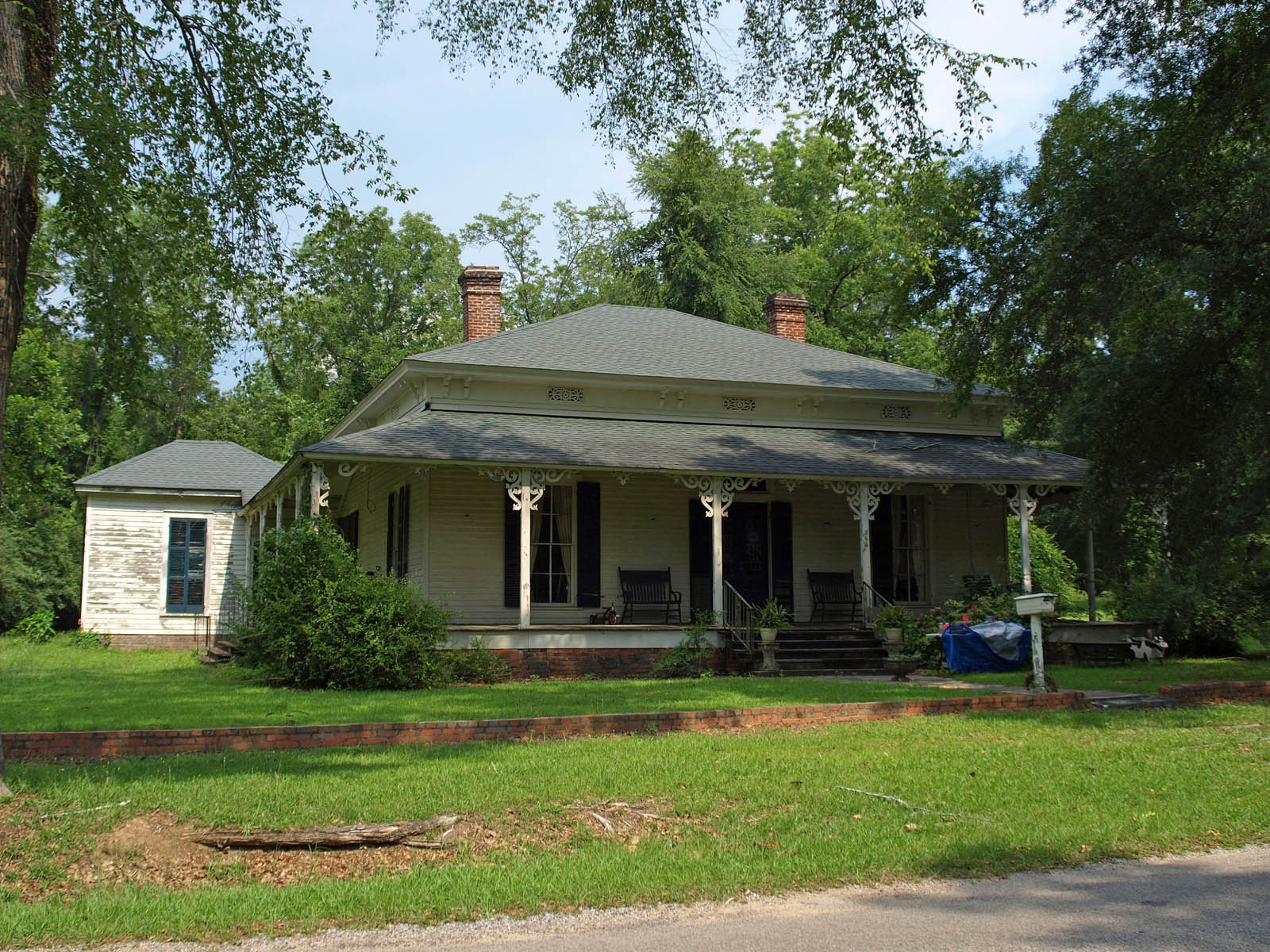
Wingate-Weir House.

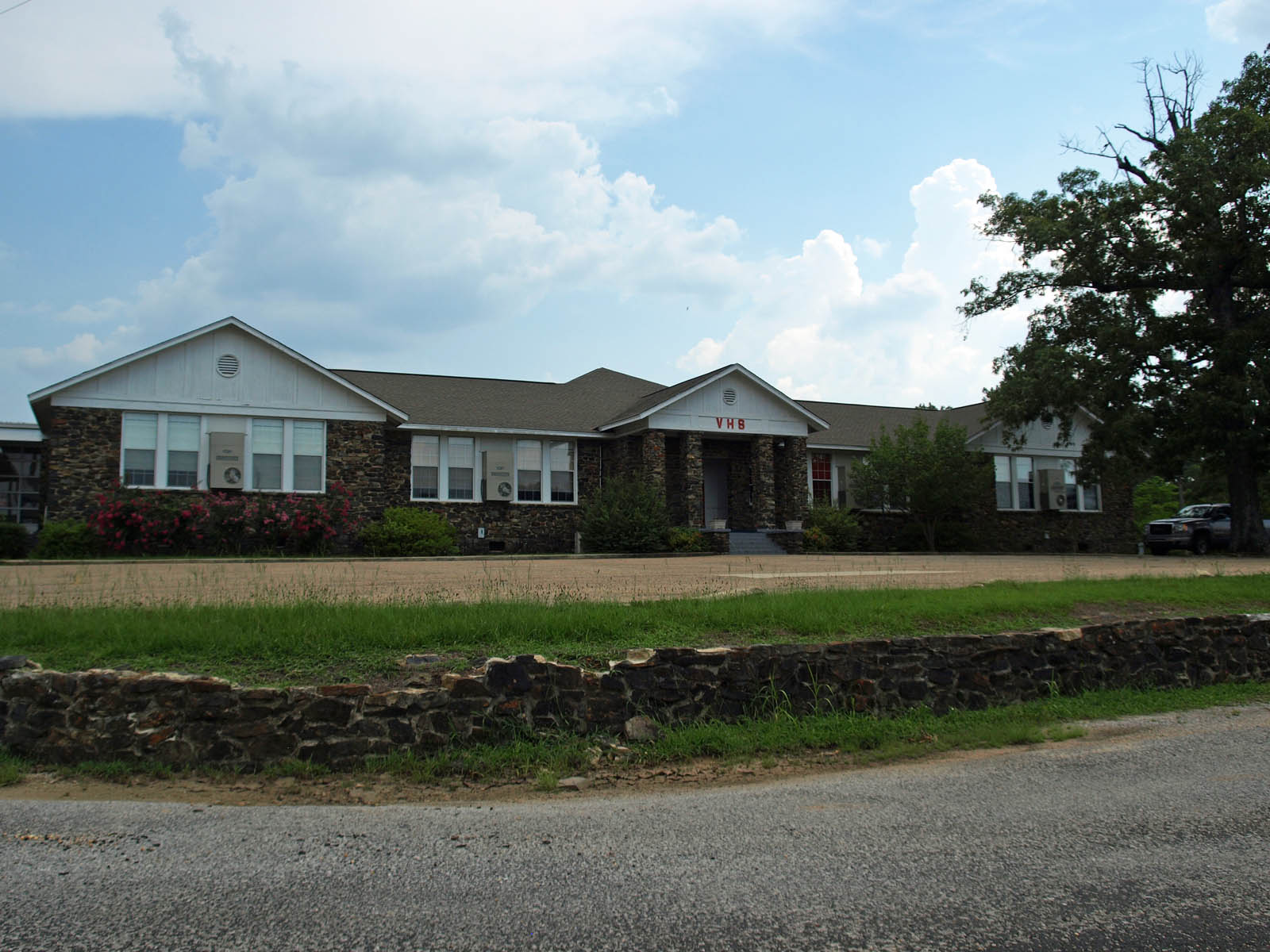
Verbena High School.

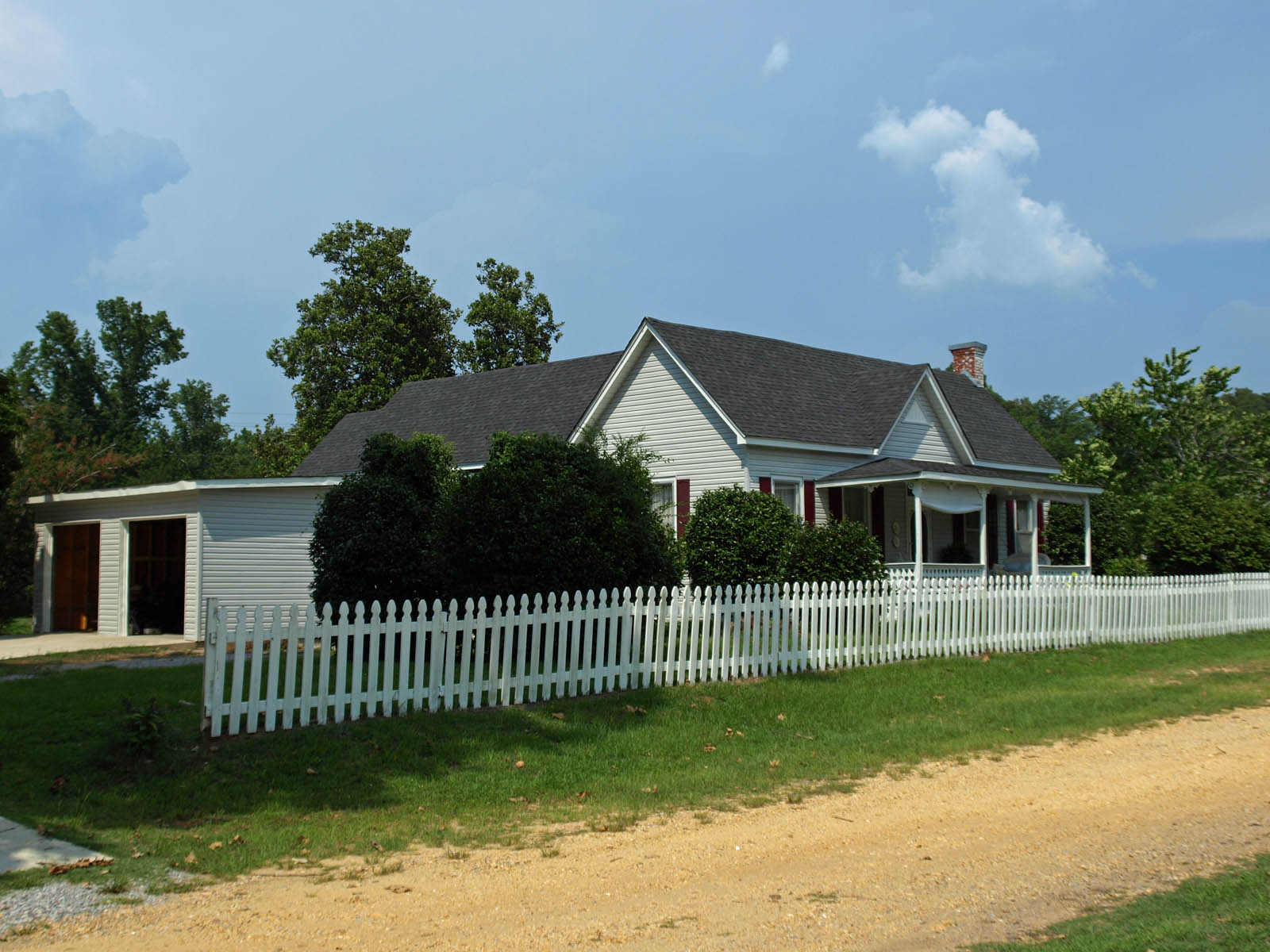
Dennis-Howard House.

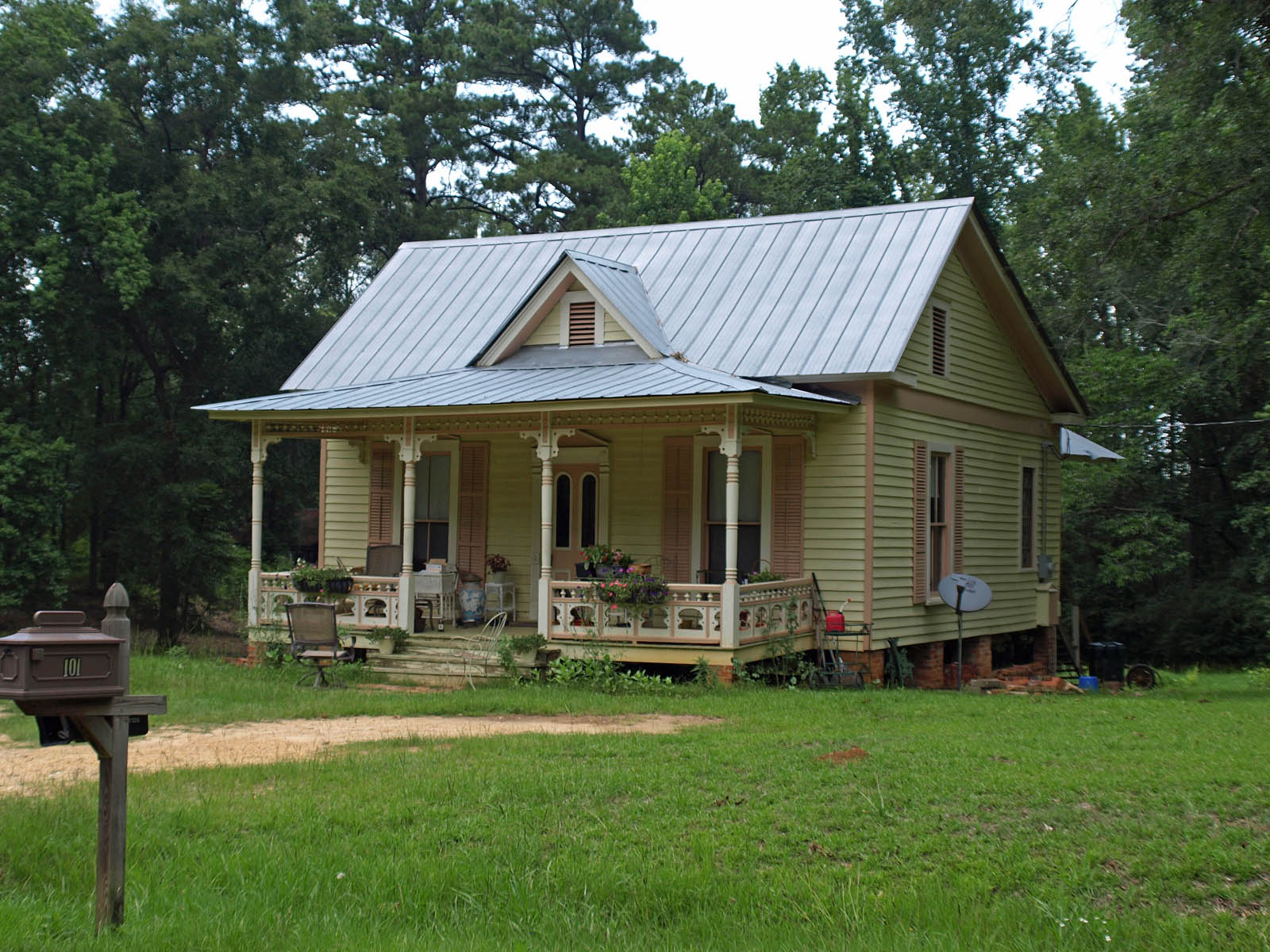
Peach Blossom.

== Climate ==
The climate in this area is characterized by hot, humid summers and generally mild to cool winters. According to the Köppen Climate Classification system, Verbena has a humid subtropical climate, abbreviated "Cfa" on climate maps.
