= General W.K. Wilson Jr. Bridge =

Overpass in Mobile, Alabama

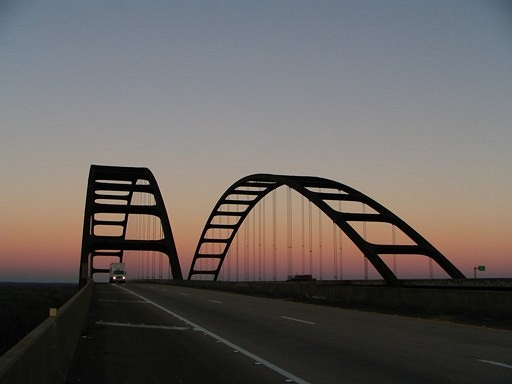
- The through-arch portion during twilight in 2005.
- Coordinates: 30°54′51″N 87°57′49″W
- Carries: 4 lanes of I-65
- Crosses: Mobile-Tensaw River delta
- Locale: Mobile County / Baldwin County, near Mobile, Alabama
- Official name: General W.K. Wilson Jr. Bridge
- Other name: "Dolly Parton" Bridge

Characteristics
- Design: dual tied through-arch and beam viaduct
- Total length: 6.08 miles (10 km)
- Longest span: 800 feet (244 m)
- Clearance below: 125 feet (38 m)

History
- Opened: October 2, 1981

Location
- Interactive map of General W.K. Wilson Jr. Bridge

The General W.K. Wilson Jr. Bridge, more commonly known locally as the "Dolly Parton Bridge", consists of dual parallel tied through arches of weathering steel and beam viaducts of concrete that form one continuous span carrying four lanes of Interstate 65 (I-65) across the Mobile-Tensaw River Delta northeast of the U.S. city of Mobile, Alabama. Built from 1978 to 1981, it spans a distance of 6.08 miles (10 km) over the delta, making it, along with the Jubilee Parkway across Mobile Bay to its south, among the longest bridges in the nation.

== Description and history ==
The General W.K. Wilson Jr. Bridge was named in honor of Walter K. Wilson, a Chief of Engineers with the United States Army Corps of Engineers and long-term resident of Mobile. He was credited with being one of the first people recognizing the need to construct a high-level bridge on I-65 over the Mobile River that would not impede waterway development. The state of Alabama named the bridge in his honor after completion of construction. Construction began in 1978, and the bridges were dedicated and opened by Governor Fob James on October 2, 1981, along with the entire 12-mile (19 km) segment between U.S. Route 43 north of Mobile and State Route 225. This was one of the last segments of Interstate Highway in Alabama to be completed, and also the most expensive highway project in the state's history at the time, costing $137 million (equivalent to $399 million in 2024).

=== Dolly Parton Bridge ===
The bridge has red aircraft warning lights atop the parallel support arches which, when combined with the shape of the supporting arches when approached and viewed from certain directions, have caused the bridge to gain the nickname "Dolly Parton Bridge".

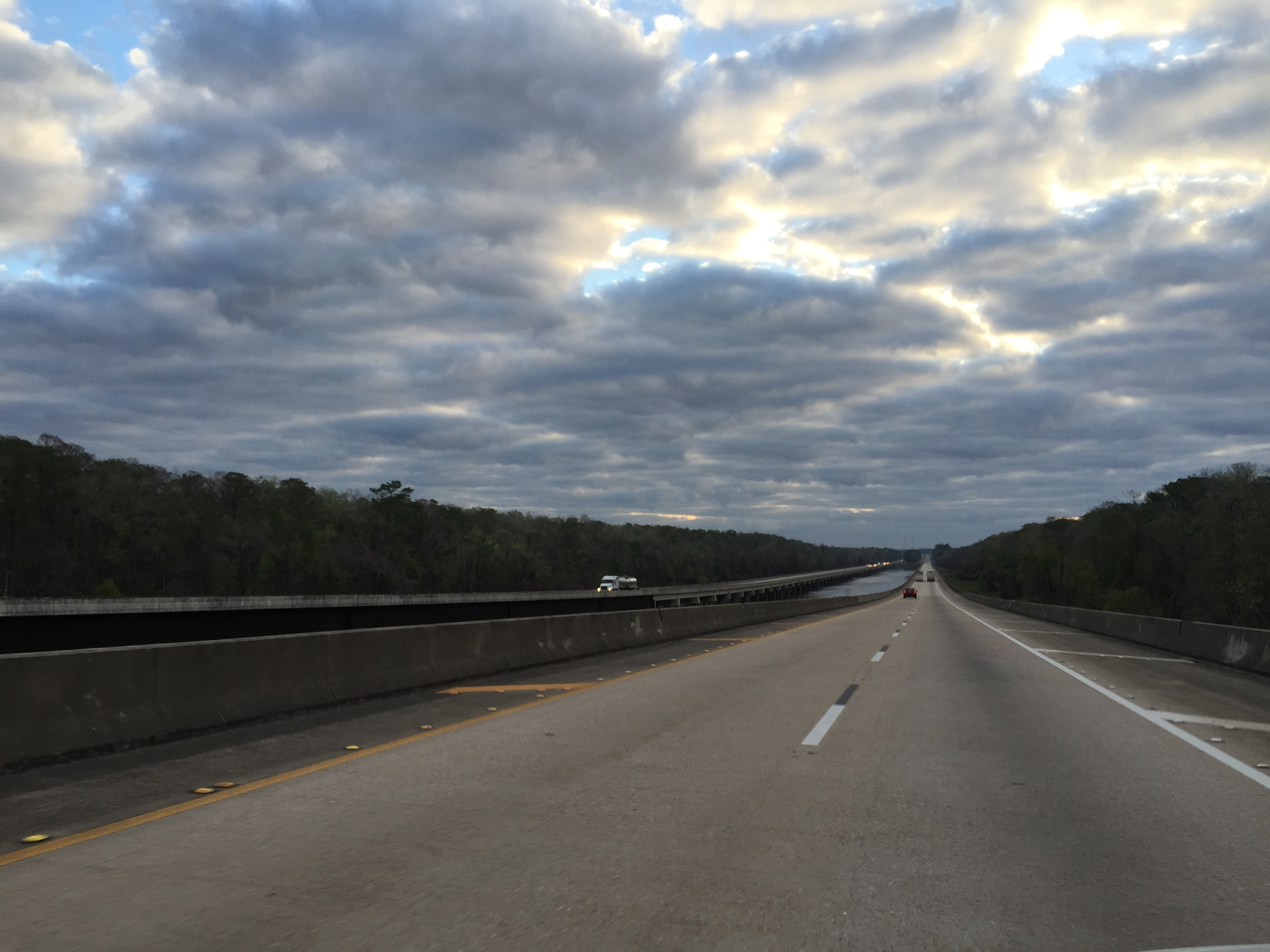
Two long, low viaducts connect the eastern side of the delta to the main span

=== 2014 fire ===
On May 22, 2014 the bridge suffered damage in the northbound portion due to extreme heat caused following an accident involving two semi-trailer trucks. The accident occurred approximately one mile (1.6 km) from the arch portion of the bridge. One truck carrying petroleum barrels, stopped due to a previous accident, was rear ended by another truck, with an explosion ensuing. The driver of the tractor which impacted the trailer was killed. The subsequent fire and extreme heat generated caused significant damage to the concrete deck. The bridge was temporarily closed for two days and then reopened to one lane of northbound traffic. The Alabama Department of Transportation estimated it would take several months to replace the top eight inches (20 cm) of the concrete deck over an unspecified area of the damaged bridge. The two northbound lanes were completely closed during construction, with the two southbound lanes divided into one southbound and one northbound lane.
