= Alabama State Route 145 =

State highway in Alabama, United States

State Route 145

Route information
- Maintained by ALDOT
- Length: 26.996 mi (43.446 km)

Major junctions
- South end: US 31 / SR 22 in Clanton
- I-65 north of Clanton
- North end: CR 61 in Wilsonville

Location
- Country: United States
- State: Alabama
- Counties: Chilton, Shelby

Highway system
- Alabama State Highway System; Interstate; US; State
← SR 144	→ SR 146

State Route 145 (SR 145) is a 26.996-mile-long (43.446 km) state highway in the central part of the U.S. state of Alabama. The southern terminus of the highway is at an intersection with U.S. Route 31 (US 31) and SR 22 in Clanton. The northern terminus of the highway is at an intersection with Shelby County Route 61 (CR 61) in Wilsonville.

== Route description ==
SR 145 is aligned on a two-lane route for its duration. It serves as a connector route between Clanton and Lay Lake, which lies along the Chilton–Shelby county line. After leaving Clanton, the highway travels to the north through rural areas of farm and timberland, and travels through no major cities or towns. It leaves Chilton County and enters Shelby County after crossing Waxahatchee Creek.

Unlike most state routes in Alabama, the northern terminus of SR 145 is at a junction with a county road. Shelby County Route 61 north of SR 145 serves as a continuation of the state route, heading into Wilsonville, where the route intersects SR 25.

== Major intersections ==
County	Location	mi	km	Destinations	Notes
Chilton	Clanton	0.000	0.000	US 31 (SR 3 / 7th Street North) / SR 22 (4th Avenue North)	Southern terminus
Chilton		3.710	5.971	I-65 – Montgomery, Birmingham	I-65 exit 212
Shelby		26.996	43.446	CR 61 (South Main Street) to SR 25	
1.000 mi = 1.609 km; 1.000 km = 0.621 mi
