= Earl Reid =

American baseball player (1913–1984)

- Pitcher
- Born: June 8, 1913; Bangor, Alabama, U.S.
- Died: May 11, 1984 (aged 70); Cullman, Alabama, U.S.
- Batted: Left Threw: Right

MLB debut
- May 8, 1946, for the Boston Braves

Last MLB appearance
- May 13, 1946, for the Boston Braves

MLB statistics
- Win–loss record: 1–0
- Earned run average: 3.00
- Strikeouts: 2
- Stats at Baseball Reference

Teams
- Boston Braves (1946)

Earl Percy Reid (June 8, 1913 – May 11, 1984) was an American professional baseball player. He was a right-handed pitcher for one season (1946) with the Boston Braves. For his career, he compiled a 1–0 record, with a 3.00 earned run average, and two strikeouts in three innings pitched.

Reid was born in Bangor, Alabama and later died in Cullman, Alabama at the age of 70.
