= Verbena United Methodist Church =

Historic church in Alabama, United States

- U.S. Historic district – Contributing property
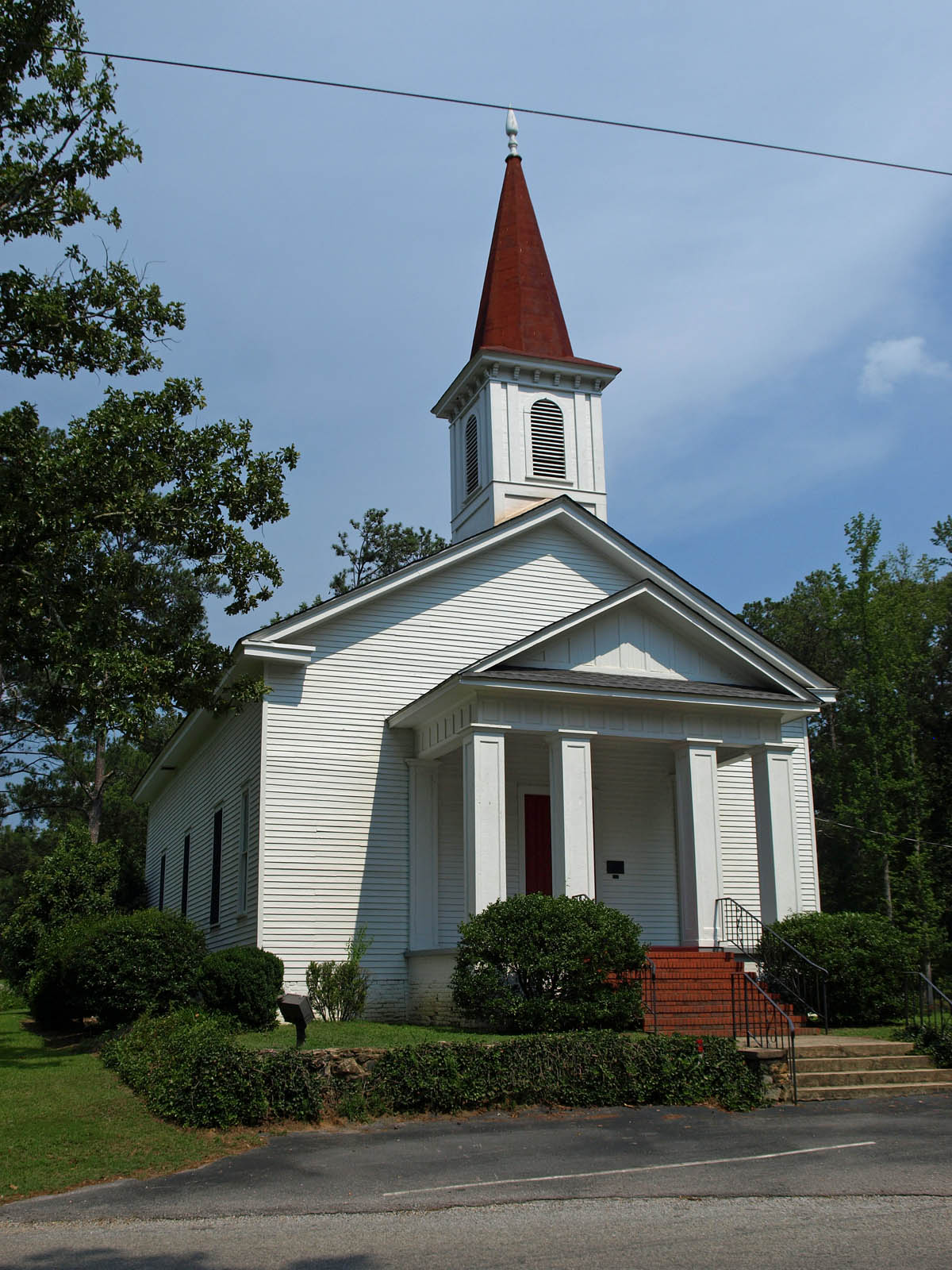
- Verbena UMC in July 2011

- Location within Alabama
- Location: US 31, Verbena, Alabama
- Coordinates: 32°44′58″N 86°30′45″W
- Built: 1877
- Part of: Verbena (ID76002238)
- Designated CP: January 19, 1976

Verbena United Methodist Church
- Verbena United Methodist Church
- Location: P.O. Box 7, Verbena, AL 36091
- Denomination: United Methodist
- Website: www.verbenaumc.com

Administration
- District: Montgomery-Prattville
- Diocese: Alabama-West Florida

Clergy
- Bishop: Bishop Paul L. Leeland
- Pastor: Rev. Jody Hill

Verbena United Methodist Church was the first church constructed in Verbena, Alabama in 1877. Originally part of The Methodist Episcopal Church, South, the church is now a United Methodist congregation. The current minister is Rev. Jody Hill .

== History ==
In the late 1870s and 1880s many families fled the city of Montgomery, Alabama in fear of Yellow Fever outbreaks. Some stayed in hotels, but many prominent families built summer homes in Verbena. Not only did the new residents build hotels, stores and schools, but also churches. The Methodist Church was the first church constructed in Verbena in 1877, and the original white frame structure is still used as the Sanctuary today.
