= Interstate 65 Tennessee River Bridge =

Bridge in Alabama, United States

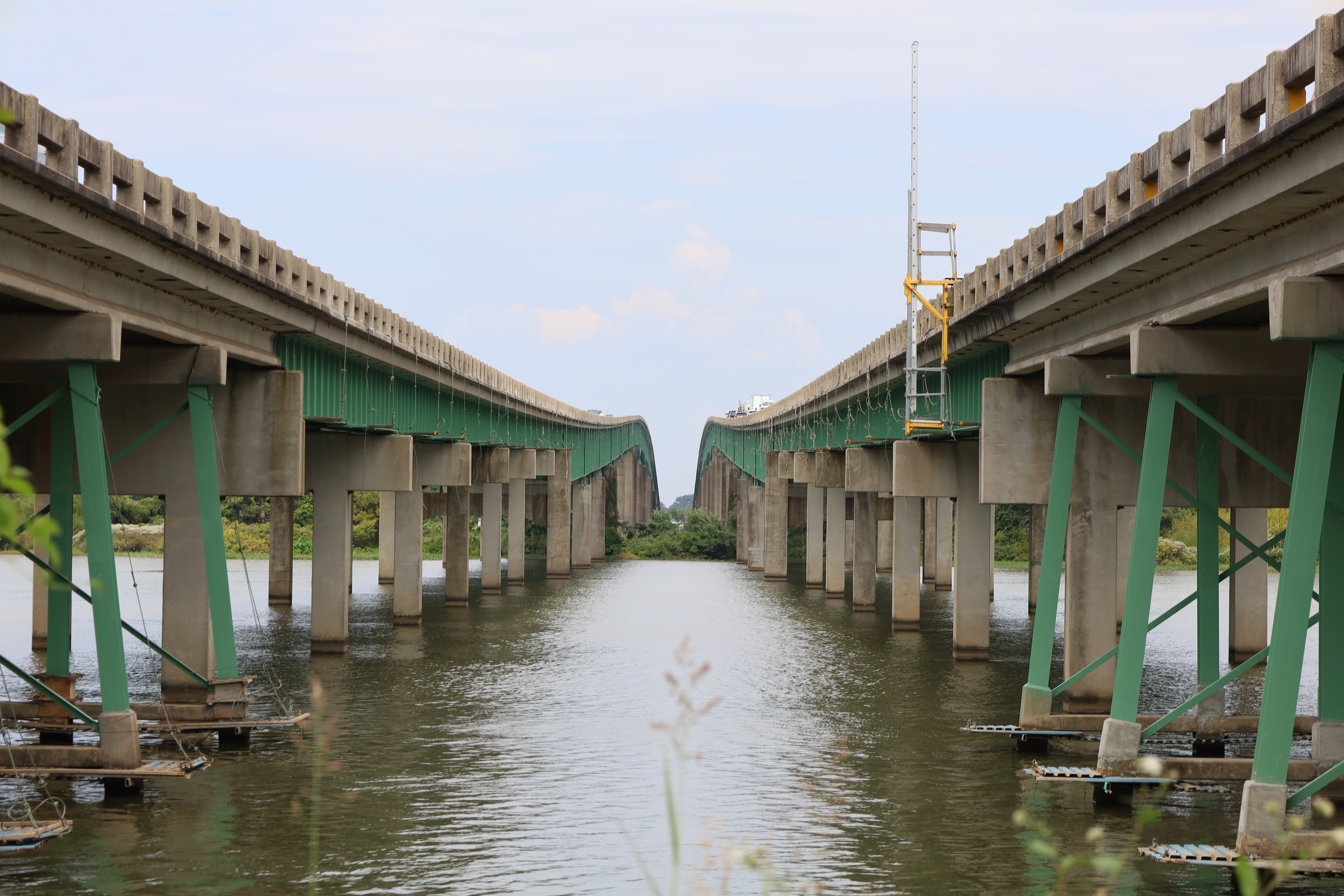
- View from between the bridges in 2025
- Coordinates: 34.5784°N 86.9077°W
- Carries: 4 lanes of I-65
- Crosses: Tennessee River, Wheeler Lake
- Locale: Morgan and Limestone County, Alabama, US

Characteristics
- Design: Plate girder bridge
- Total length: 9,965.9 feet (3,037.6 m)
- Width: 43 feet (13 m) (both spans)
- Height: 57 feet (17 m)

History
- Construction start: April 1969
- Construction end: October 24, 1973
- Opened: November 21, 1973

Statistics
- Daily traffic: 50,435 (2025)

Location
- Interactive map of Interstate 65 Tennessee River Bridge

The Interstate 65 Tennessee River Bridge is a pair of steel plate girder bridges that carry Interstate 65 (I-65) across the Wheeler Lake impoundment of the Tennessee River near Decatur, Alabama, United States. The bridges are 9,965.9 feet (3,037.6 m) long, and are located in Wheeler National Wildlife Refuge in Morgan and Limestone counties. The bridges opened in 1973.

== Description ==
The I-65 Tennessee River Bridge is located on river mile 309.6 in Wheeler National Wildlife Refuge approximately four miles (6 km) east of Decatur on the border between Morgan and Limestone counties in the northern part of the U.S. state of Alabama. They are also located about 20 miles (30 km) west of downtown Huntsville, and the northern end is about two miles (3 km) south of I-65's interchange with I-565, the main spur route into Huntsville. The bridge is maintained by the Alabama Department of Transportation (ALDOT).

The bridges cross the main navigation channel of the Tennessee River, which has a maximum vertical clearance of 57 feet (17 m), as well as a floodplain on the river's north bank where the spans are lower. The higher clearance at the south end also allows continuous water flow along the river's south bank for waterfowl. The channel crossing consists of 13 longer spans with a steel plate girder structure supported by 12 piers. This is followed by 141 approach spans across the floodplain with smaller steel and concrete girders supported by 252 steel bents. The longest span is 375 feet (114 m) long. Each has a deck width of 43 feet (13 m), with two lanes and right shoulders. The bridges are 9,965.9 feet (3,037.6 m), or approximately 1.89 miles (3.04 km), long.

== History ==
Construction on the bridges began in April 1969. Each year, construction was halted between November 1 and March 1 during mallard mating and Canada geese migration season and as part of an agreement with the refuge and U.S. Department of the Interior. Refuge officials initially wanted the bridges relocated to the east away from prime waterfowl areas, but agreed to the location after state highway officials agreed to the construction pause.

Construction was completed on October 24, 1973. The bridges were dedicated and opened by Governor George Wallace on November 21, 1973, along with the connecting six-mile (10 km) stretch of I-65 between State Route 67 (SR 67) in Priceville and US 72 Alternate/SR 20 (now also the western terminus of I-565). The bridges cost $18 million (equivalent to $99.5 million in 2025), and also completed I-65 from north of Birmingham to Nashville, Tennessee.

Between July 16 and August 10, 2012, a friction polymer overlay was applied to the bridges' surface to improve traction and prevent icing, requiring temporary lane closures. In January 2024, work began on a project to rehabilitate the bridges, which required periodic lane closures. The project included repairs to joints, bearings, and the steel structure to extend its life. The guardrails were also retrofitted and the steel was repainted to prevent corrosion and rust. The project was completed in May 2026.

== See also ==
- List of crossings of the Tennessee River
