= Alabama State Route 213 =

State highway in Alabama, United States

State Route 213

Route information
- Maintained by ALDOT
- Length: 5.753 mi (9.259 km)

Major junctions
- South end: US 45 in Saraland
- I-65 in Saraland
- North end: US 43 in Prichard

Location
- Country: United States
- State: Alabama
- Counties: Mobile

Highway system
- Alabama State Highway System; Interstate; US; State
← SR 212	→ SR 215

State Route 213 (SR 213) is an 5.753-mile-long (9.259 km) route that serves as a connection between Saraland and Prichard in Mobile County.

== Route description ==
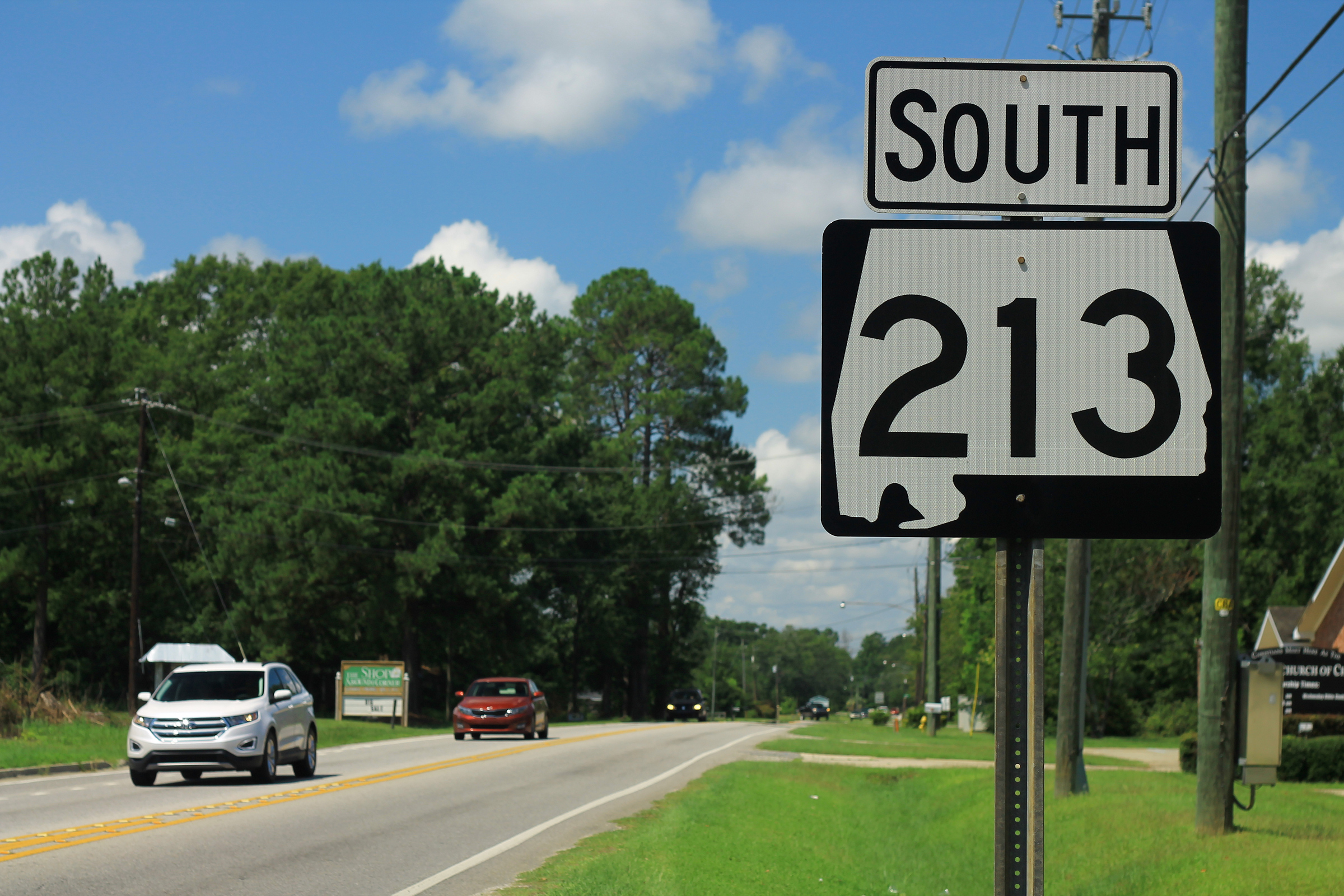
A sign denoting Alabama State Route 213, located in Saraland.

The southern terminus of SR 213 is at its intersection with US 45 at Eight Mile in Prichard. From this point it travels in a northeasterly route where it shares a brief concurrency with SR 158 at its junction with I-65. After I-65, the route continues to its northern terminus at US 43 at Saraland.

== Major intersections ==
The entire route is in Mobile County.

Location	mi	km	Destinations	Notes
Prichard	0.0	0.0	US 45 (Saint Stephens Road/SR 17) – Citronelle, Mobile	Southern terminus
Saraland	2.989	4.810	SR 158 west (Industrial Parkway)	Southern end of concurrency with SR 158
Saraland	3.131	5.039	I-65 – Mobile, Montgomery	I-65 Exit 13
Saraland	3.257	5.242	SR 158 east (Industrial Parkway)	Northern end of concurrency with SR 158
Saraland	5.753	9.259	US 43 (Saraland Boulevard/SR 13) – Satsuma, Chickasaw	Northern terminus
1.000 mi = 1.609 km; 1.000 km = 0.621 mi: Concurrency terminus
