= Rodney Slate =

Australian rules footballer

Personal information
- Full name: Rodney Howarth Slate
- Born: 10 June 1930; Yallourn, Victoria
- Died: 14 November 1999 (aged 69); Perth, Western Australia
- Original team: St Kilda CYMS (CYMSFA)
- Height: 179 cm (5 ft 10 in)
- Weight: 72 kg (159 lb)

Playing career^{1}
Years	Club	Games (Goals)
1952	St Kilda	1 (0)
- ^{1} Playing statistics correct to the end of 1952.

Rodney Howarth Slate (10 June 1930 – 14 November 1999) was an Australian rules footballer who played with St Kilda in the Victorian Football League (VFL).
