= Castleberry, Alabama =

- Town
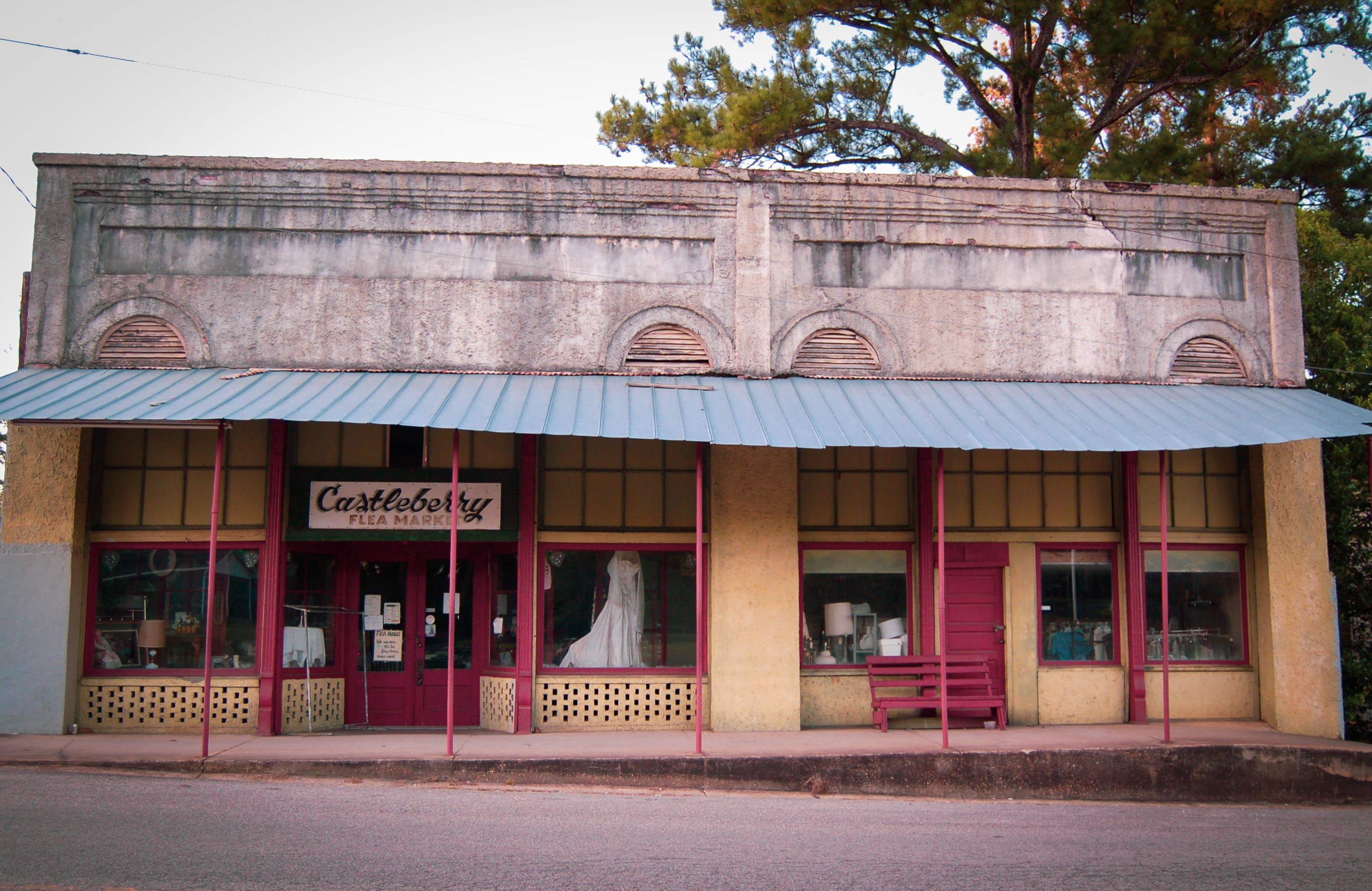
- Store building in Castleberry

- Location of Castleberry in Conecuh County, Alabama.
- Coordinates: 31°18′00″N 87°01′37″W
- Country: United States
- State: Alabama
- County: Conecuh

Area
  - Total: 1.73 sq mi (4.48 km^{2})
  - Land: 1.71 sq mi (4.43 km^{2})
  - Water: 0.019 sq mi (0.05 km^{2})
- Elevation: 180 ft (55 m)

Population (2020)
  - Total: 486
  - Density: 284.0/sq mi (109.65/km^{2})
- Time zone: UTC-6 (Central (CST))
  - Summer (DST): UTC-5 (CDT)
- ZIP code: 36432
- Area code: 251
- FIPS code: 01-12496
- GNIS feature ID: 2406236

Castleberry is a town in south central Conecuh County, Alabama, United States. At the 2020 census, the population was 486. Castleberry is known as the "Strawberry Capital of Alabama" and is home to the annual Castleberry Strawberry Festival.

== Geography ==
Castleberry is located in southern Conecuh County.

According to the U.S. Census Bureau, the town has a total area of 1.7 square miles (4.5 km^{2}), of which 0.02 square miles (0.05 km^{2}), or 1.09%, is water.

== Demographics ==
Historical population
Census	Pop.	Note	%±
1900	167		—
1910	225		34.7%
1920	313		39.1%
1930	427		36.4%
1940	609		42.6%
1950	667		9.5%
1960	669		0.3%
1970	666		−0.4%
1980	847		27.2%
1990	669		−21.0%
2000	590		−11.8%
2010	583		−1.2%
2020	486		−16.6%
U.S. Decennial Census; 2013 Estimate

As of the census of 2000, there were 590 people, 257 households, and 150 families residing in the town. The population density was 344.0 inhabitants per square mile (132.8/km^{2}). There were 331 housing units at an average density of 193.0 per square mile (74.5/km^{2}). The racial makeup of the town was 63.22% White, 35.59% Black or African American, 0.85% Pacific Islander, and 0.34% from two or more races.

There were 257 households, out of which 25.7% had children under the age of 18 living with them, 39.7% were married couples living together, 16.0% had a female householder with no husband present, and 41.6% were non-families. 37.7% of all households were made up of individuals, and 18.3% had someone living alone who was 65 years of age or older. The average household size was 2.30 and the average family size was 3.05.

In the town, the population was spread out, with 25.1% under the age of 18, 6.6% from 18 to 24, 27.6% from 25 to 44, 24.4% from 45 to 64, and 16.3% who were 65 years of age or older. The median age was 36 years. For every 100 females, there were 79.9 males. For every 100 females age 18 and over, there were 74.0 males.

The median income for a household in the town was $21,204, and the median income for a family was $30,000. Males had a median income of $27,386 versus $17,143 for females. The per capita income for the town was $13,154. About 21.8% of families and 26.6% of the population were below the poverty line, including 34.0% of those under age 18 and 29.2% of those age 65 or over.

== Education ==
- Conecuh County Junior High School
