= Alabama State Route 158 =

State highway in Alabama, United States

State Route 158
- State Route 158 highlighted in red

Route information
- Maintained by ALDOT
- Length: 21.44 mi (34.50 km)
- Existed: 1963–present

Major junctions
- West end: US 98 near Wilmer
- US 45 / SR 17 at Prichard; SR 213 in Saraland; I-65 in Saraland
- East end: US 43 / SR 13 in Saraland

Location
- Country: United States
- State: Alabama
- Counties: Mobile

Highway system
- Alabama State Highway System; Interstate; US; State
| ← SR 157 | → SR 159 |

State Route 158 (SR 158) is a 21.44-mile-long (34.50 km) state highway in northern Mobile County in the southwestern corner of the U.S. state of Alabama. The western terminus of the highway is at an intersection with U.S. Route 98 (US 98) northwest of Wilmer, just shy of the Mississippi state line. The eastern terminus of the highway is at an intersection with U.S. Route 43 (US 43) at Saraland. The route will eventually be upgraded to a four-lane bypass of Semmes.

== Route description ==
SR 158 serves as a connector route between U.S. Route 98 (US 98) and U.S. Route 45 (US 45) to the west and Interstate 65 (I-65) and U.S. Route 43 (US 43) to the east. It is planned as a four-lane expressway that connects Mississippi, Semmes, the University of Mobile and Saraland, but portions of it west of the university are still two-lane as of 2026. The route widens to five lanes at its intersection with SR 213 near its interchange with I-65 at exit 13. The highway narrows to two lanes east of the interstate highway as it continues to its intersection with US 43.

== History ==
SR 158 was first formed in 1972, starting at US 43 at Saraland and ending with US 45 at Kushla.

In the early 2000s, SR 158 was planned to be expanded with an estimated cost of $180 million. Construction of SR 158 began in 2004.

Construction was halted in 2007, due to a lawsuit that was filed by Mobile Bay Keepers against Alabama DOT. The lawsuit was over the violation of the Clean Water Act since they were letting construction runoff enter the watershed off the drinking water supply for Mobile County.

The unfinished part of SR 158 became known as the extension. In 2017, the state of Alabama directed $65 million from the BP oil spill settlement money and an additional $50 million to complete the project and extend the current road from its previous western terminus at Newburn Road 12.16 miles (19.57 km) to US 98. It bypasses a stretch of US 98 ("Old 98"), colloquially known as "Bloody 98" by locals due to its high amount of traffic fatalities. The extension was estimated to cost $80 million. After about a decade, construction resumed in 2017. Construction was scheduled for completion by late 2023 to early 2024. Most of the route is completed, with the portion west of Wilmer still under construction as of June 2023. The extension opened to traffic on October 17, 2023.

== Major intersections ==
The entire route is in Mobile County.

| Location | mi | km | Destinations | Notes |
|---|---|---|---|---|
| | 0.000 | 0.000 | US 98 / SR 42 | Western terminus, opened to traffic on October 17, 2023 |
| Semmes | 12.160 | 19.570 | Newburn Road | Former western terminus until October 17, 2023 |
| Prichard | 16.680 | 26.844 | US 45 / SR 17 – Mobile, Citronelle, Butler, Meridian | Interchange |
| Prichard | 18.180 | 29.258 | CR 55 (College Parkway/Kali Oka Road) – University of Mobile | Interchange |
| Saraland | 19.290 | 31.044 | SR 213 south (Shelton Beach Road) | Western end of SR 213 concurrency |
| Saraland | 19.445 | 31.294 | I-65 – Mobile, Montgomery | I-65 exit 13 |
| Saraland | 19.655 | 31.632 | SR 213 north (Shelton Beach Road) | Eastern end of SR 213 concurrency |
| Saraland | 21.440 | 34.504 | US 43 / SR 13 (Saraland Boulevard South) – Chickasaw | Eastern terminus |
1.000 mi = 1.609 km; 1.000 km = 0.621 mi: Concurrency terminus
