= Rabun, Alabama =

Unincorporated community in Alabama, United States

- Unincorporated community
- Location within Alabama Location within the United States
- Coordinates: 31°01′37″N 87°43′30″W
- Country: United States
- State: Alabama
- County: Baldwin
- Elevation: 259 ft (79 m)
- Time zone: UTC-6 (Central (CST))
  - Summer (DST): UTC-5 (CDT)
- Area code: 251
- GNIS feature ID: 125397

Rabun is an unincorporated community in Baldwin County, Alabama, United States.

== History ==
The community is named in honor of the Rabon family, who were early settlers of the area. A post office operated under the name Rabun from 1916 to 1959.

The Rabon Turpentine Company operated from 1928 to 1937 and distilled turpentine. The company constructed a commissary, homes, and a school.
