= National Register of Historic Places listings in Mobile County, Alabama =

Location of Mobile County in Alabama

This is a list of the National Register of Historic Places listings in Mobile County, Alabama.

This is intended to be a complete list of the properties and districts on the National Register of Historic Places in Mobile County, Alabama, United States. Latitude and longitude coordinates are provided for many National Register properties and districts; these locations may be seen together in an online map.

There are 138 properties and districts listed on the National Register in Mobile County, including four National Historic Landmarks. 114 of these sites, including all of the National Historic Landmarks, are located in Mobile, and are listed separately; the remaining 24 sites are listed here.

This National Park Service list is complete through NPS recent listings posted January 16, 2026.

== Current listings ==
=== Outside Mobile ===
	Name on the Register	Image	Date listed	Location	City or town	Description
1	Hiram B. Austin House	Hiram B. Austin House	February 11, 1988 (#88000106)	12995 Dauphin Island Pkwy. 30°25′12″N 88°06′17″W	Mon Louis Island	
2	Barr's Subdivision Historic District	Barr's Subdivision Historic District	January 25, 1990 (#89002452)	Roughly along U.S. 45 and Howard Ave. between LeBaron and State; 31°05′33″N 88°14′20″W	Citronelle	
3	Bellingrath Gardens and Home	Bellingrath Gardens and Home	October 19, 1982 (#82001609)	South of Theodore off State Route 59; 30°25′49″N 88°08′26″W	Theodore	
4	Bishop Manor Estate	Bishop Manor Estate	February 14, 1985 (#85000255)	11570 Argyl Rd. 30°27′01″N 88°15′37″W	St. Elmo	
5	Central Core Historic District	Central Core Historic District	January 25, 1990 (#89002424)	Roughly State St. and LeBaron Ave. from Mobile to 2nd Sts. 31°05′34″N 88°13′52″W	Citronelle	
6	Chickasaw Shipyard Village Historic District	Chickasaw Shipyard Village Historic District	September 3, 2004 (#04000924)	Bounded by Jefferson St., Jackson St., Yeend Ave., and Chickasaw Creek; 30°45′49″N 88°04′28″W	Chickasaw	
7	Citronelle Railroad Historic District	Citronelle Railroad Historic District	January 25, 1990 (#89002421)	Roughly Centre and Main from Union to Faye; 31°05′14″N 88°13′39″W	Citronelle	
8	Willis G. Clark House	Willis G. Clark House	January 25, 1990 (#89002454)	East of U.S. Route 45 south of Citronelle; 31°00′10″N 88°12′34″W	Citronelle	
9	Davis-Oak Grove District	Davis-Oak Grove District	May 3, 1988 (#88000445)	Western side of Oak Grove Rd. just north of Kali Oka Rd. 30°51′42″N 88°11′13″W	Mauvilla	
10	Dauphin Island School		June 28, 2018 (#100001878)	1016 Bienville Blvd. 30°15′17″N 88°06′52″W	Dauphin Island	
11	Ellicott Stone	Ellicott Stone	April 11, 1973 (#73000359)	1 mile south of Bucks off U.S. Route 43; 30°59′52″N 88°01′21″W	Bucks	
12	Fort Gaines	Fort Gaines	December 12, 1976 (#76000348)	South of Mobile on the eastern end of Dauphin Island; 30°14′54″N 88°04′32″W	Dauphin Island	
13	Charles Denby Garrison Sr. House		September 9, 2009 (#09000693)	County Road 55, approximately 1 mile northwest of its junction with State Route 158; 30°48′54″N 88°07′58″W	Prichard	
14	Grand Bay Historic District	Grand Bay Historic District	June 28, 1990 (#90000918)	Junction of Dezauche Ln. and Freeland; 30°28′34″N 88°20′32″W	Grand Bay	
15	Indian Mound Park	Indian Mound Park	August 14, 1973 (#73000360)	Off Cadillac Ave. on the northern side of Dauphin Island; 30°15′24″N 88°06′25″W	Dauphin Island	
16	Isle Dauphine Club	Isle Dauphine Club	January 31, 2017 (#16000815)	100 Orleans Dr. 30°14′49″N 88°07′06″W	Dauphin Island	
17	George Leatherbury House		June 14, 1990 (#90000917)	Shell Belt Rd. southeast of Sans Souci Beach; 30°22′47″N 88°15′04″W	Coden	Destroyed by Hurricane Katrina
18	Jacob Magee House	Jacob Magee House	February 12, 1988 (#88000112)	County Road 45 north of Kushla Mcleod Rd. 30°49′20″N 88°09′48″W	Kushla	
19	Middle Bay Light	Middle Bay Light	December 30, 1974 (#74000429)	Middle of Mobile Bay; 30°26′18″N 88°00′40″W	Mobile Bay	
20	Mount Vernon Arsenal-Searcy Hospital Complex	Mount Vernon Arsenal-Searcy Hospital Complex	May 26, 1988 (#88000676)	Coy Smith Highway, ½ mile east of State Route 43; 31°05′16″N 88°01′44″W	Mt. Vernon	
21	Nanna Hubba Bluff		October 1, 1974 (#74000430)	Overlooking the Tombigbee River in the northeastern corner of Mobile County; 31°09′25″N 87°58′34″W	Calvert	Destroyed
22	Old Mobile Site; Fort Louis De La Louisiane	Old Mobile Site; Fort Louis De La Louisiane	May 6, 1976 (#76000344)	Twenty-Seven Mile Bluff on the Mobile River; 30°58′01″N 87°59′32″W	Le Moyne	
23	Tanner Farmhouse	Tanner Farmhouse	May 20, 2008 (#08000429)	6885 Walter Tanner Rd. 30°50′07″N 88°21′51″W	Wilmer	
24	N.Q. and Virginia M. Thompson House	N.Q. and Virginia M. Thompson House	January 25, 1990 (#89002453)	7850 LeBaron Ave. 31°05′43″N 88°13′43″W	Citronelle	

== See also ==
- List of National Historic Landmarks in Alabama
- National Register of Historic Places listings in Alabama
