= Fernland, Alabama =

Unincorporated community in Alabama, United States

- Unincorporated community
- Location within Alabama Location within the United States
- Coordinates: 30°29′00″N 88°17′35″W
- Country: United States
- State: Alabama
- County: Mobile
- Elevation: 112 ft (34 m)
- Time zone: UTC−6 (Central (CST))
  - Summer (DST): UTC−5 (CDT)
- Area code: 251
- GNIS feature ID: 118262

Fernland is an unincorporated community in Mobile County, Alabama, United States. Fernland lies along U.S. Route 90 midway between the towns of Grand Bay to the west and St. Elmo to the east. The community originally formed around a sawmill with its own post office and rail service. During the days of segregation, elementary students attended Grand Bay Elementary School for Colored, which was located in the community. Current high school students attend Alma Bryant High School.
