= Brooks Barnhizer =

American basketball player (born 2002)

No. 23 – Oklahoma City Thunder
- Position: Shooting guard
- League: NBA

Personal information
- Born: March 2, 2002 (age 24) Lafayette, Indiana, U.S.
- Listed height: 6 ft 5 in (1.96 m)
- Listed weight: 230 lb (104 kg)

Career information
- High school: Alma Bryant (Irvington, Alabama); Jefferson (Lafayette, Indiana)
- College: Northwestern (2021–2025)
- NBA draft: 2025: 2nd round, 44th overall pick
- Drafted by: Oklahoma City Thunder
- Playing career: 2025–present

Career history
- 2025–present: Oklahoma City Thunder
- 2025–present: →Oklahoma City Blue

Career highlights
- Third-team All-Big Ten (2024); Big Ten All-Defensive Team (2024)
- Stats at NBA.com
- Stats at Basketball Reference

Brooks Barnhizer (born March 2, 2002) is an American professional basketball player for the Oklahoma City Thunder of the National Basketball Association (NBA), on a two-way contract with the Oklahoma City Blue of the NBA G League. He played college basketball for the Northwestern Wildcats.

== Early life and high school career ==
Barnhizer grew up in Elkhart, Indiana before moving to Irvington, Alabama in 2015. He began playing for the varsity basketball team at Alma Bryant High School, where his father was the head basketball coach, while in the eighth grade. After his sophomore year, Barnhizer's family moved to Lafayette, Indiana and he transferred to Jefferson High School. He averaged 20.7 points per game as a junior. As a senior, Barnhizer averaged a state-high 32.7 points per game while also averaging 11.5 rebounds, 6.5 assists, 3.8 steals, and 2.6 blocks. Barnhizer was rated a three-star recruit and committed to playing college basketball for Northwestern over offers from Butler, Xavier, and Western Kentucky.

== College career ==
Barnhizer played in 11 games during his freshman season with the Northwestern Wildcats and averaged 1.7 points per game. He played in all 34 of the Wildcats' games as a sophomore as the team's sixth man and averaged 7.6 points and 4.9 rebounds per game.

During his junior season, Barnhizer moved into Northwestern's starting lineup and started all 34 games, averaging 14.6 points, 7.5 rebounds, 2.6 assists, 1.8 steals, and 0.8 blocks per game. He recorded 10 double-doubles—the most in a single season by a Northwestern guard—and was named third-team All-Big Ten Conference as well as earning a spot on the Big Ten All-Defensive Team. He also played a key role in Northwestern's consecutive NCAA Tournament appearances, including scoring the tying layup to force overtime in the Wildcats’ first-round win over Florida Atlantic.

In his senior season, Barnhizer was selected to the preseason All-Big Ten Conference team by media. Through 17 games, he averaged 17.1 points, 8.8 rebounds, 4.2 assists, 2.3 steals, and 1.1 blocks per game, recording nine double-doubles with a streak of seven consecutive games—a program record. In January 2025, he aggravated a lingering foot injury and missed the remainder of the season. Despite the shortened campaign, he earned honorable mention All-Big Ten Conference honors and was recognized as Northwestern's Big Ten Sportsmanship Award honoree.

Barnhizer finished his collegiate career with 1,067 points, posting career averages of 11.1 points, 6.1 rebounds, and 2.2 assists over 96 games (51 starts). He became the first Big Ten player since Michael Redd to reach at least 1,000 points, 500 rebounds, and 200 assists within his first 96 career games, while also recording 133 steals and 62 blocks.

== Professional career ==
Barnhizer was selected with the 44th overall pick by the Oklahoma City Thunder in the 2025 NBA draft.

== Career statistics ==
Legend
GP	Games played	GS	Games started	MPG	Minutes per game
FG%	Field goal percentage	3P%	3-point field goal percentage	FT%	Free throw percentage
RPG	Rebounds per game	APG	Assists per game	SPG	Steals per game
BPG	Blocks per game	PPG	Points per game	**Bold**	Career high

=== NBA ===
Year	Team	GP	GS	MPG	FG%	3P%	FT%	RPG	APG	SPG	BPG	PPG
2025–26	Oklahoma City	40	0	8.7	.380	.292	.700	2.0	.6	.3	.1	1.7
Career		40	0	8.7	.380	.292	.700	2.0	.6	.3	.1	1.7

=== College ===
Year	Team	GP	GS	MPG	FG%	3P%	FT%	RPG	APG	SPG	BPG	PPG
2021–22	Northwestern	11	0	7.5	.231	.182	.833	.7	1.0	.5	.3	1.7
2022–23	Northwestern	**34**	0	24.3	.410	.310	**.836**	4.9	1.1	.8	.4	7.6
2023–24	Northwestern	**34**	**34**	36.7	**.429**	**.348**	.766	7.5	2.6	1.8	.8	14.6
2024–25	Northwestern	17	17	**36.9**	.414	.266	.764	**8.8**	**4.2**	**2.3**	**1.1**	**17.1**
Career		96	51	29.0	.415	.310	.782	6.1	2.2	1.4	.6	11.1
