= George Leatherbury House =

Historic house in Alabama, United States

- U.S. National Register of Historic Places
- Location within Alabama Location within the United States
- Location: Shell Belt Rd. SE of Sans Souci Beach, Coden, Alabama
- Coordinates: 30°22′47″N 88°15′4″W
- Area: 3.6 acres (1.5 ha)
- Built: 1912
- Architectural style: Bay house
- NRHP reference No.: 90000917
- Added to NRHP: June 14, 1990

The George Leatherbury House was a historic house along the shore of Portersville Bay, halfway between Bayou La Batre and Bayou Coden, in southern Mobile County, Alabama.

== Description and history ==
It was built in 1912 by George Scarborough Leatherbury in the local "Bay house" style. Leatherbury owned several lumber companies in Mississippi and operated a naval stores company. The house was added to the National Register of Historic Places on June 14, 1990. It was subsequently destroyed on August 29, 2005, by an estimated record-level 12-to-16-foot (3.7 to 4.9 m) storm surge generated by Hurricane Katrina.
