= Grand Bay Savanna Little River Road Addition State Nature Preserve =

Protected area in Alabama, United States

Coordinates: 30°23′24″N 88°16′41″W

The Grand Bay Savanna- Little River Road Tract Addition was acquired with financial support from the U.S. Fish and Wildlife Service in 2004, through the National Coastal Wetlands program. This tract serves as an addition to the Grand Bay Savanna Addition Tract State Nature Preserve acquired in 1996. The addition consists of 113 acres of piney flatwoods south of Grand Bay, Alabama.
