= Grand Bay Elementary School for Colored =

Information
- Established: 1919

The Grand Bay Elementary School for Colored, also known simply as the Grand Bay School, was a racially segregated elementary school located midway between Grand Bay, Alabama and St. Elmo, Alabama along U.S. Route 90. The school was established in 1919 with support from the residents of the surrounding community of Fernland and funding from the Julius Rosenwald Fund. It was constructed on land donated for that purpose by Peter Alba, a Confederate veteran of the Civil War, who lived at Bayou La Batre, Alabama. Of the thousands of schools constructed by the Rosenwald Fund, this school was the eleventh school so funded. All that remains of the original school is a 2 by 3 feet (0.61 m × 0.91 m) piece of stone and mortar.

== See also ==
- Julius Rosenwald
- Rosenwald School
