= August P. Trovaioli =

American educator and artist

August P. Trovaioli (January 8, 1921 – June 21, 1975) was an American educator, artist, and author.

== Biography ==
Trovaioli was born in Rome, Italy on January 8, 1921. His father, Agostino Trovaioli and his monther Anna Falco Trovaioli had previously immigrated to the United States and had returned to Italy for his birth. While still an infant, he immigrated to the United States with his parents, Agostino and Anna Trovaioli. They arrived at Ellis Island, New York, aboard the steamship Canada on June 12, 1921, having sailed from Naples. At the time of his arrival, his name was listed as Agostino Filippo Trovaioli. The family subsequently settled in Pennsylvania. Many of his extended family members, dating back some four generations, worked as artists and ceramicists. Trovaioli followed in their footsteps, developing a love for art and art history.

In 1938, he graduated from high school in Uniontown, Pennsylvania and enrolled at the University of Pittsburgh where he served as editor of the school yearbook. After graduating in 1942, he enlisted in the US Army Air Forces and was stationed at Keesler Air Force Base in Biloxi, Mississippi. While stationed in Biloxi, he met his wife, Iris Moore. They were married in 1945, and, following discharge from military service, they settled in Grand Bay, Alabama.

After the war, Trovaioli earned a master's degree in education from the University of Alabama. He became a teacher in the Mobile County, Alabama public school system, eventually rising to the position of principal at Grand Bay Elementary School and Superintendent of Mobile County Schools. Trovaioli lived in Grand Bay until his death in 1975.

== Career ==
While developing a lifelong career as an educator, Trovaioli worked in art restoration, restoring pieces for private collectors and public exhibits. He specialized in early American art, and became an authority on the life and work of Southern painter William Aiken Walker.

Trovaioli was instrumental in broadening art education opportunities in both public and private schools across the Gulf Coast. He devoted much of his time and energy to raising public awareness and appreciation of art and was a founding member of the Mobile Art Association, in Mobile, Alabama, the Eastern Shore Art Association in Fairhope, Alabama, and the Singing River Art Association, in Pascagoula, Mississippi.

== Published works ==
William Aiken Walker: Southern Genre Painter (Pelican Publishing)
