= Big Shrimpin' =

American reality television series

- Genre: Reality
- Starring: Cpt. Redbone; Cpt. Bullfrog; Cpt. Roundhead; Dominick Ficarino
- Narrated by: Jerry Buckner
- Composer: Vanacore Music
- Country of origin: United States
- Original language: English
- No. of seasons: 1
- No. of episodes: 8

Production
- Executive producers: Craig Piligian; Eddie Rohwedder; David M. Barsky; Susan Werbe
- Producers: Mark Duncan; Numa Fernandez; June Molgaard; Greg Tillman; Derek "Scoop" Whipple; Joe Talley; Joe Quigley; Mike Piscitelli
- Production locations: Texas, Alabama, Louisiana (Southern United States/Gulf Coast)
- Editors: Tony Diaz; Todd Felker; Kirk Kirkman; Allison MacEwan; Jeff Thurlow
- Camera setup: Multiple (Kip Robbins, Chris Knoblock)
- Running time: 45-48 minutes
- Production companies: Pilgrim Films; A&E Television Networks

Original release
- Network: History
- Release: November 17, 2011 – January 5, 2012

Big Shrimpin' is an American reality television series that premiered on November 17, 2011 on the History channel. The series follows three longtime shrimpers from Bayou La Batre, Alabama who are employed for Dominick Ficarino, who owns Dominick's Seafood. They battle each other, other companies, and harsh conditions as they shrimp for several months nonstop in the waters of Texas, Alabama, and Louisiana.

== Cast ==
=== Dominick's Seafood ===
- Dominick Ficarino - He presides over the entire enterprise and is a lifelong Bayou La Batre resident and fourth-generation shrimper who owns Dominick’s Seafood, the most successful business in town. He’s a boss with an iron fist in a velvet glove, and his crews are loyal to a fault.

=== Miss Hannah Crew ===
- Captain: Charles ("Redbone") - He is the commander of the Miss Hannah and is a fourth-generation shrimper. He claims that he has 5 decades of experience because his mother gave birth to him on a shrimping boat 50 years ago. His personality can stir up trouble with his crew though in the tight quarters of the boat.
- Deckhand: Charles Jr. ("Red")
- Deckhand: Chad ("Pecker Head")
- Deckhand: BJ

=== Miss Barbara Crew ===
- Captain: Jeremy Schjott ("Bullfrog") - He is the ruler of the roost of the Miss Barbara. He is 32 and is Dominick's youngest captain. He used to be a deckhand and has now commanded his own ship for 8 years. He is a practical joker and is dead serious about his job.
- Deckhand: Larry Godsey ("Dog")
- Deckhand: Michael Shawn Robbins
- Deckhand: Mikey Mo Robbins

=== Miss Ashleigh Crew ===
- Captain: Roy Wilkerson ("Roundhead") - He considers himself as one of the best shrimpers in the business. He has had bad luck come his way the past few years. His son Jonathan works on the boat with him and they have a testy relationship.
- Deckhand: Jonathan Wilkerson ("Little Roundhead")
- Deckhand: Joe Covas
- Deckhand: Bryant St. Amant ("Little Fella")
- Deckhand: Bobby Ray

== Episodes ==
No.	Title	Original release date
1	"No Rest 'Til Texas"	November 17, 2011
Deep in the heart of America's shrimping industry, the men of Bayou La Batre, Alabama prepare for the most important day of their season--the start of the Texas Open in the Gulf of Mexico. Dominick's three captains, known as Bullfrog, Redbone and Roundhead, race to the starting line and the potential saltwater gold that waits them. The past seasons have been tough and the stakes are high. Captain Bullfrog is a shrimp whisperer, determined to outperform his mentor, Captain Redbone, the grizzled veteran who is not giving an inch. Captain Roundhead has had a hard couple of seasons and is looking for redemption. They each run into trouble along the way and the decisions they each make to solve their problems says a lot about who they are.
2	"Shrimpin' 'Round the Clock"	November 24, 2011
As the Texas open kicks off, problems are not far behind. While Bullfrog hits the jackpot, Redbone is left with a twisted lazy line--a loss that could affect the rest of the trip. On the Miss Ashleigh a full net seems promising but turns out to be slab rock from the bottom of the ocean that damages the net. Just as the Miss Ashleigh recovers, they encounter problems with their generator. Despite Bullfrog's early stroke of luck, the Barbara runs into trouble when Mikey Mo has a brush with sharks, followed by a damaged boot that threatens to slow down the haul for the entire boat. Yet, from technical problems to sleep deprivation, Dominick's crews manage to come back strong, with Redbone redeeming himself with a huge haul of beautiful brown gold.
3	"Rising Storm"	December 1, 2011
With the Texas Open in full swing the boats are banking on good hauls in order to cash in big. The captains are doing well and Roundhead lucks out hitting saltwater gold. Unfortunately Bullfrog encounters freezer trouble that threatens to hinder his success, and greenhorn BJ's inexperience is slowing things down on the Hannah. In difficult times the boats support each other--the Hannah and Ashleigh arrange a boat-to-boat trade to pass off some much needed supplies. But just as things turn around and the fishing gets good, the captains find out that they are dead in the path of Tropical Storm Don. When Dominick comes on the radio insisting the boats dock at the nearest port, it's a race to haul in their nets and get out of Don's path of destruction.
4	"Troubled Waters"	December 8, 2011
After sacrificing their brown gold hauls to dock for Tropical Storm Don, the boats are anxious to get back to sea. Unfortunately, Barbara, whose mechanical problems have left the boat immobile, blocks in the Hannah at the dock. Neither Bullfrog nor Redbone will be getting back to sea anytime soon, and both watch helplessly as Miss Ashleigh gets a head start on fishing. Despite Roundhead's advantage he runs into trouble when a leaky bag shows negligence on the part of one of the deckhands. When Barbara's starter is finally fixed, Redbone and Bullfrog hustle to make up for lost time, hitting brown gold! But just as Bullfrog makes a comeback he discovers a problem that forces him yet again to leave the saltwater gold behind and head in to Bayou La Batre.
5	"First Weigh-In"	December 15, 2011
Emotions are running high as the end of the Texas Open draws near. From hysterical boat pranks, to near death shark experiences, to the sobering news that Redbone's father has had a stroke, the shrimpers of Dominick's fleet just want to do whatever it takes to get home safely and cash in their saltwater gold.
6	"King of the Texas Open"	December 22, 2011
Miss Ashleigh and Miss Barbara head back out for their second trip on the gulf, but are forced to dock due to Tropical Storm Lee. Meanwhile Redbone's record breaking haul is overshadowed by the news that his father has died.
7	"First Come First Serve"	December 29, 2011
After being battered by Tropical Storm Lee, Captains Bullfrog and Roundhead each race to reposition themselves for huge hauls back at sea, while Redbone, after spending time mourning his father, re-enters the race for saltwater gold in an entirely new location.
8	"The Fleet's Fortune"	January 5, 2012
From mechanical failures to storms, from extreme competition to personal loss, the shrimpers of Bayou Le Batre have been through a lot this season. Now it's time to see who will be crowned king.

== See also ==
- Deadliest Catch a similar series on the Discovery Channel
- Lobster Wars a similar series on the Discovery Channel
