= Antwan Odom =

American football player (born 1981)

No. 98
- Position: Defensive end

Personal information
- Born: September 24, 1981 (age 45); Mobile, Alabama, U.S.
- Listed height: 6 ft 5 in (1.96 m)
- Listed weight: 275 lb (125 kg)

Career information
- High school: Alma Bryant (Irvington, Alabama)
- College: Alabama
- NFL draft: 2004: 2nd round, 57th overall pick

Career history
- Tennessee Titans (2004–2007); Cincinnati Bengals (2008–2010)

Awards and highlights
- First-team All-SEC (2003)

Career NFL statistics
- Total tackles: 131
- Sacks: 23.5
- Forced fumbles: 5
- Fumble recoveries: 2
- Defensive touchdowns: 2
- Stats at Pro Football Reference

Antwan Deon Odom (born September 24, 1981) is an American former professional football player who was a defensive end in the National Football League (NFL). He played college football for the Alabama Crimson Tide and was selected by the Tennessee Titans in the second round of the 2004 NFL draft. Odom also played for the Cincinnati Bengals.

He went to high school at Alma Bryant High School, where he started at defensive end and occasionally played wide receiver.

== College career ==
Odom played in 39 games for the University of Alabama during his five-year collegiate career. He recorded 98 tackles, 21 sacks, and 26 tackles for losses in his career.

As a freshman, Odom played in every game with two starts. He was named an honorable mention for Freshman All-American by Rivals.com. As a sophomore, Odom's season was ended after receiving and having surgery on a torn labrum in his left shoulder and met requirement to regain a year of eligibility by the NCAA.

During his redshirt sophomore year, he played in all 13 games for the Tide and recorded 42 tackles with 10 sacks.

His junior season, Odom was named as All-Southeastern Conference after starting every game of the season at right defensive end in which he recorded 40 tackles, 8 sacks, and 9.5 tackles for loss. He was later honored with the team's Dwight Stephenson Most Valuable Lineman Award.

On April 14, 2010, Antwan was selected to the University of Alabama's "Team of the Decade". An Alabama Team of the Decade has been selected by Crimson Tide fans since originated by Alabama Sports Information Director Charley Thornton in 1970. The teams have been selected by readers of 'BAMA Magazine and BamaMag.com the past four decades.

== Professional career ==
=== Tennessee Titans ===
Odom was selected in the second round of the 2004 NFL draft, as the 57th overall and 3rd pick by the Tennessee Titans. He played four seasons with the Titans as he was a key defensive lineman during the Titans' 2007-08 season in which he recorded some of his best career numbers to date. Coming in second on the team to Kyle Vanden Bosch, Odom recorded 8.0 sacks on the season including 2.0 which helped the Titans defeat the Colts in Week 17 and make the playoffs for the first time since the 2003 season.

=== Cincinnati Bengals ===
He was signed by the Cincinnati Bengals during free agency in 2008, after becoming one of fourteen free agents from the Titans. Odom suffered two injuries that caused him to miss time in 2008. He missed the entire preseason schedule due to foot injury suffered in opening training camp practice on July 28. He was inactive for four games due to a shoulder injury suffered in practice. In the second week of the 2009 regular season, Odom tied a Bengals franchise record by sacking quarterback Aaron Rodgers five times in a 31–24 win over the Green Bay Packers. Odom left the Week 6 game versus the Texans with an Achilles heel injury. ESPN reported that Odom would be out for the season. Before Training Camp, Odom was quoted in saying he was ready for the 2010 season, as he said the tendon was feeling better and he could run and be ready to play and start at 100%.

On July 29, 2011, Odom was released by the Bengals.

=== Career statistics ===
Year	Team	Games	Starts	Tackles					Interceptions						Fumbles			
Year	Team	Games	Starts	Total	Solo	Ast	Sack	Sfty	PD	Int	Yards	Avg	Long	TD	FF	FR	Yds	TD
2004	TEN	16	8	21	14	7	2.0	–	3	–	–	–	–	–	1	–	–	–
2005	TEN	16	9	31	18	13	2.0	–	1	–	–	–	–	–	1	–	–	–
2006	TEN	4	2	9	8	1	0.5	–	0	–	–	–	–	–	0	–	–	–
2007	TEN	16	16	21	16	5	8.0	–	7	–	–	–	–	–	1	–	–	–
2008	CIN	12	8	26	19	7	3.0	–	2	–	–	–	–	–	2	–	–	–
2009	CIN	6	6	19	18	1	8.0	–	2	–	–	–	–	–	0	–	–	–
2010	CIN	4	3	4	3	1	0.0	–	1	–	–	–	–	–	0	–	–	–
Career		74	52	131	96	35	23.5	0	16	0	0	0	0	0	5	–	–	–

== Personal life ==
In his spare time, Odom enjoys fishing and hunting. He is also a NASCAR racing and pro-wrestling enthusiast. Odom earned a degree in Human Environmental Studies upon completing his course work at the University of Alabama.

On March 15, 2011, Odom's home in Mason, OH (a suburb of Cincinnati) was severely damaged by fire. Odom and his family were safe at his family's house in Cordova, Alabama at the time. On August 22, 2011, Odom was shot in the leg at his home in Irvington. Odom was arrested on December 15, 2011, for possession of marijuana after a traffic stop in Baldwin County, Alabama. He was released later in the day after posting $1,000.00 bail.

Odom was charged with one count of conspiracy to commit wire fraud and health care fraud, one count of wire fraud, and one count of health care fraud by the United States Department of Justice on July 24, 2020. He pleaded guilty by December 2020. By February 2022, he had been sentenced to 180 days of house arrest and ordered to perform 240 hours of community service.
