= Davis-Oak Grove District =

Historic district near Mauvilla, Alabama, United States

- U.S. National Register of Historic Places
- U.S. Historic district
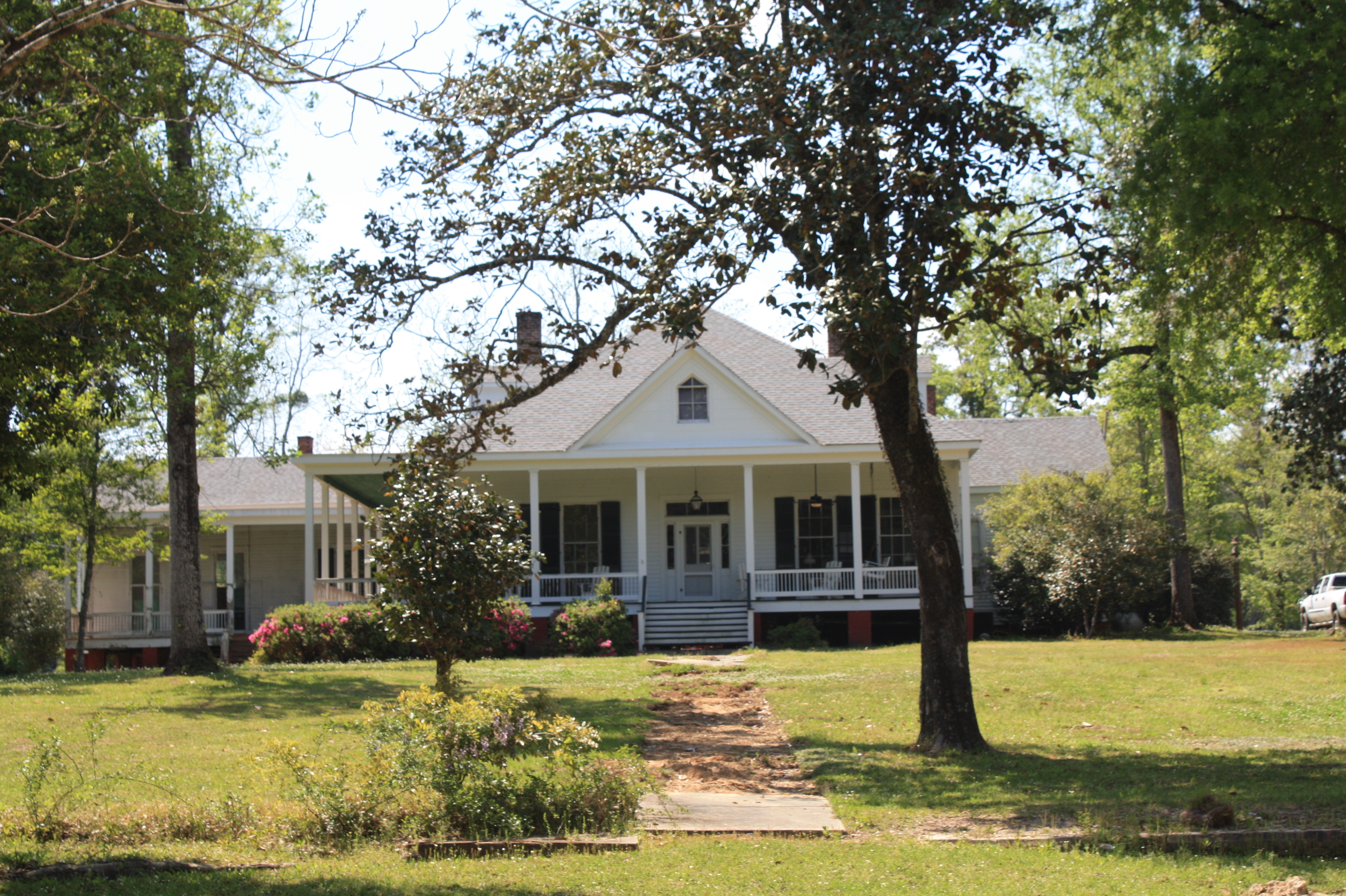
- A house in the Davis-Oak Grove District

- Location within Alabama Location within the United States
- Nearest city: Mauvilla, Alabama
- Coordinates: 30°51′42″N 88°11′13″W
- Area: 12.2 acres (4.9 ha)
- Built: 1890
- Architectural style: Greek Revival
- NRHP reference No.: 88000445
- Added to NRHP: May 3, 1988

The Davis-Oak Grove District is a historic district near Mauvilla in rural Mobile County, Alabama, United States. It is on the western side of Oak Grove Road, north of the intersection with Kali Oka Road. The district covers 12.2 acres (0.049 km^{2}) and contains 16 contributing properties. It was placed on the National Register of Historic Places on May 3, 1988.
