= El Cazador (ship) =

Spanish brig, wrecked 1784

History

Spain
- Name: El Cazador
- Fate: Wrecked early-1784

General characteristics
- Type: Two-masted brig of war
- Length: 90 feet

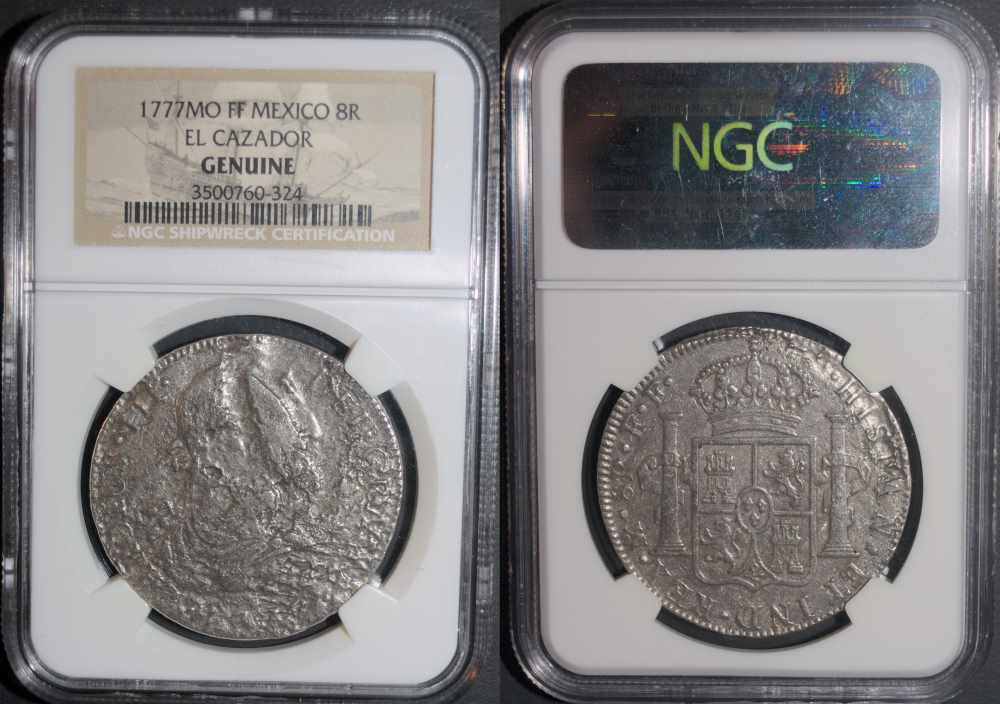
1777 eight reales coin from the El Cazador Shipwreck graded by NGC.

The El Cazador (meaning The Hunter in English) was a Spanish brig that sank in the Gulf of Mexico in 1784. The wreck was discovered in 1993 and the silver cargo recovered and sold.

== Voyage ==
In the 1770s the Spanish Louisiana Territory’s economy was faltering due to paper money that was not backed by silver or gold. Carlos III, King of Spain, decided to replace the worthless currency with valuable Spanish silver coins. On 20 October 1783 Charles III of Spain sent her on a mission to bring much-needed hard currency to the Spanish colony of Louisiana in order to stabilize the currency. The ship sailed to Veracruz, Mexico, where she was loaded with approximately 450,000 Spanish reales. To be more precise, she was loaded with silver Spanish coins, mostly 8 reales, “Pieces of Eight,” It carried 400,000 silver pesos and another 50,000 pesos worth of smaller change, of various dates. At one ounce to the peso, and 12 troy ounces to the pound, that's 37,500 pounds of silver. King Carlos III enlisted his most trusted captain, Gabriel de Campos y Pineda, to command the ship. On 11 January 1784, she sailed for New Orleans, and was never heard from again. Spain’s attempts to locate the ship were unsuccessful and in June 1784, El Cazador was officially listed as missing at sea.

== Discovery ==
On 2 August 1993, the trawler Mistake, under Captain Jerry Murphy from the home port of Pascagoula, Mississippi, was fishing in the Gulf of Mexico fifty miles south of New Orleans. As it fished, Mistake's net hung on a snag. When the crew hoisted the net and dumped the contents on the deck, they found the net was filled with silver coins. The coins bore markings from the Spanish mint in Mexico, along with the date 1783.

Treasure from the ship was originally housed in a safe at the old Grand Bay State Bank building in Grand Bay, Alabama. In December 2004 the Executors of the Reahard estate hired Jonathan Lerner of Scarsdale Coin to appraise the coins. This appraisal was completed in February 2005.

In 2007 Franklin Mint purchased about 360,000 coins from El Cazador to sell through its shopping network.
