= Taylor Harper =

American politician

Taylor Harper (born November 25, 1944) is an American lobbyist and former American politician. Harper was born in Mobile, Alabama and grew up in Grand Bay. He graduated from Grand Bay High School and attended the University of Southern Mississippi where he obtained a bachelor's degree. In 1968, he married Julie Ann Goodroe.

In 1978, Harper was elected as a Democrat to the Alabama Legislature from House District 105 where he represented communities from south Mobile County. He was elected chairman of the House Ways and Means Committee in 1987, a post he held throughout the remainder of his tenure in the legislature. In 1994 Harper entered the race for lieutenant governor. He subsequently withdrew from that race and stood for re-election to his House seat. He lost that bid for re-election and began work as a consultant. He is currently chief executive officer of Southeast Consultants, an advisory firm with offices in Montgomery, Alabama.
