= Grand Bay Historic District =

Historic district in Alabama, United States

- U.S. National Register of Historic Places
- U.S. Historic district
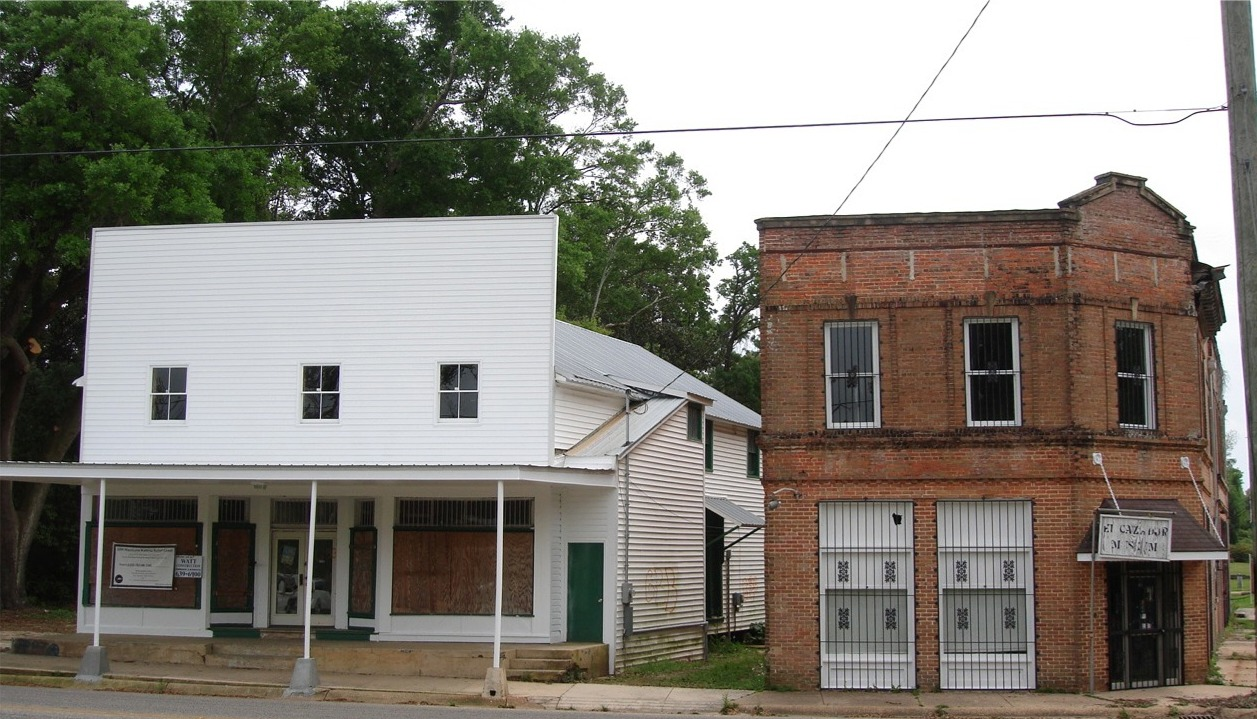

- Location within Alabama Location within the United States
- Location: Jct. of Dezauche Ln. and Freeland; Grand Bay, Alabama
- Coordinates: 30°28′34″N 88°20′32″W
- Area: 1.2 acres (0.49 ha)
- Built: 1907
- Architectural style: Vernacular commercial style
- NRHP reference No.: 90000918
- Added to NRHP: June 28, 1990

Grand Bay Historic District is a historic district in Grand Bay, Alabama. Listed on the National Register of Historic Places in 1990, the district comprises twelve acres and the three remaining original buildings from Grand Bay's central business district. The buildings include the former Freeland General Store, Grand Bay State Bank, and a small commercial building. The site was once the central business hub of the town and included an L&N passenger station, railway freight station, numerous packing houses, and additional general mercantile businesses.

== Freeland General Store ==
Freeland General Store was owned and operated by Albert Freeland. The building, a traditional two-story white frame structure, became the centerpiece of the town's commercial district. A prominent member of the community, Freeland was elected County Commissioner in 1918. He remained active in local and state politics until his death.

== Grand Bay State Bank ==
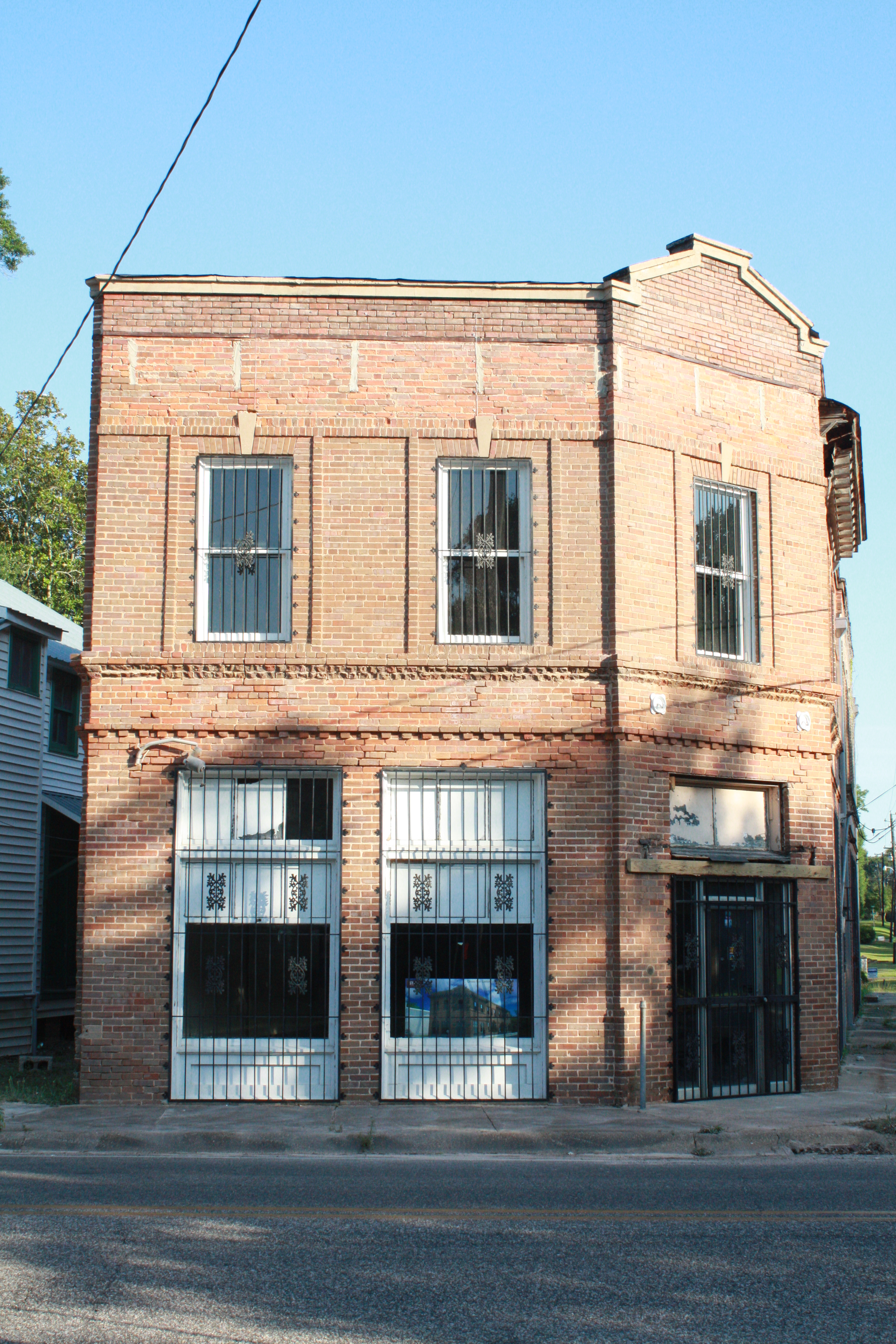
Grand Bay State Bank building

Grand Bay State Bank was incorporated in 1912. It remained in business until 1930. The bank occupied a two-story red brick building at the corner of Freeland Lane next to Freeland General Store.

== See also ==
- National Register of Historic Places listings in Mobile County, Alabama
