= Mississippi Sandhill Crane National Wildlife Refuge =

United States National Wildlife Refuge in Mississippi

- IUCN category IV (habitat/species management area)
- Location within the United States
- Nearest city: Gautier, Mississippi
- Coordinates: 30°28′31″N 88°47′00″W
- Area: 19,000 acres (77 km^{2})
- Established: 1975
- Website: Mississippi Sandhill Crane National Wildlife Refuge

The Mississippi Sandhill Crane National Wildlife Refuge was established in 1975 to safeguard the endangered Mississippi sandhill crane and its unique disappearing wet pine savanna habitat. The refuge consists of more than 19,000 acres (77 km^{2}) in four units and is now part of the Gulf Coast National Wildlife Refuge Complex. The Refuge Complex Manager also administers Grand Bay National Wildlife Refuge (Mississippi/Alabama) and Bon Secour National Wildlife Refuge (Alabama).
