= Alma Bryant High School =

Location
- 14001 Hurricane Boulevard; Irvington, Alabama 36544; United States; 30°26′28″N 88°16′50″W

Information
- School type: Public
- Established: 1998 (28 years ago)
- School district: Mobile County Public School System
- CEEB code: 010251
- Principal: David Sprinkle
- Teaching staff: 90.00 (on an FTE basis)
- Grades: 9–12
- Enrollment: 1,591 (2023–2024)
- Student to teacher ratio: 17.68
- Colors: Blue and white
- Nickname: Hurricanes
- Website: www.almabryanths.com

Alma Bryant High School is a public high school located in Irvington, Alabama, United States, off State Highway 188 between Grand Bay and Bayou La Batre.

It serves Bayou La Batre, Coden, Dauphin Island, Grand Bay, Irvington, Mon Louis Island, and St. Elmo.

== Founding ==
The school was formed in 1998 by combining Alba High School (in Bayou La Batre) and Grand Bay High School (formerly called Mobile County High School), who transitioned into respective middle schools. The school was named for Alma Bryant, an influential south Mobile County educator who had taught for a period of time at both schools.

== Athletics and activities ==
The archery team has been a top finisher in the AASP tournaments since 2005 and regularly feature as one of the nation's premier archery teams. School athletic teams are known as the Hurricanes.

Since 2014, Bryant High has been in the AHSAA Class 7A. Prior to the 2014-15 School year they were in Class 6A, formerly the largest class.

The Eye Network, a self-described student-run broadcasting organization perhaps named after a common nickname for CBS, it also happens to reference the center of a hurricane also known as the “eye” has published broadcasts of Alma Bryant athletics on their YouTube channel since 2019 and daily morning announcements since 2021.

== Notable alumni ==
- Antwan Odom, National Football League player
