= Isle Dauphine Club =

Historic building in Dauphin Island, Alabama

- U.S. National Register of Historic Places
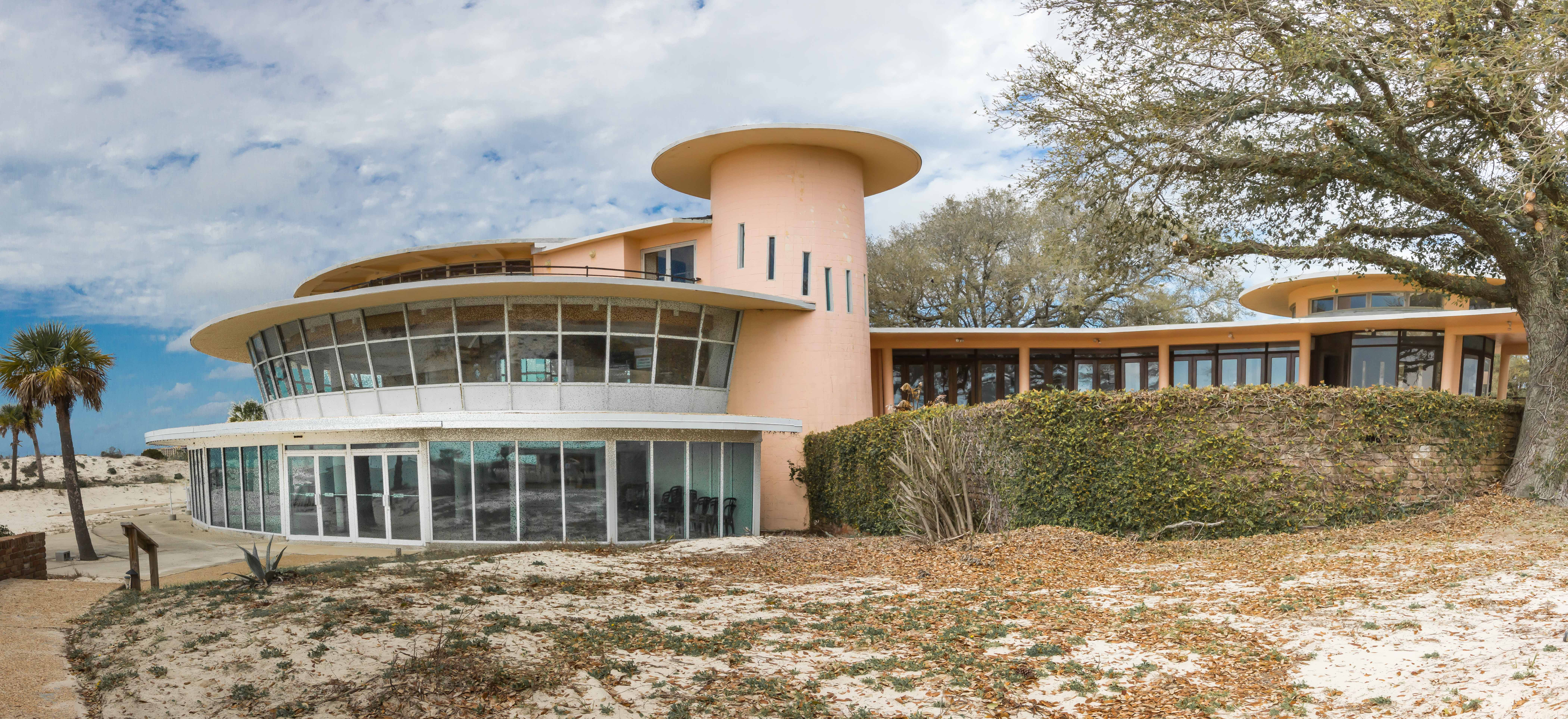
- The main building in February 2018
- Interactive map of Isle Dauphine Club
- Location: 100 Orleans Dr., Dauphin Island, Alabama
- Coordinates: 30°14′49″N 88°07′06″W
- Built: 1957
- Architect: Arch R. Winter and T. Howard Ellis
- NRHP reference No.: 16000815
- Added to NRHP: January 31, 2017

The Isle Dauphine Club is a historic social club in Dauphin Island, Alabama. The club was developed by the Dauphin Island Property Owners Association, and came to encompass the main club building, a restaurant, swimming pool, tennis courts, and a golf course. The Mid-century modern main club building was completed in 1957 and consists of three floors. The main room on each floor features circular walls, with windows facing the Gulf of Mexico. The golf clubhouse was completed in 1962, and the golf course was built the following year. A restaurant has occupied the building since 2015.

The architects were Arch R. Winter and T. Howard Ellis of Mobile. The club was listed on the National Register of Historic Places in 2017.
