= N.Q. and Virginia M. Thompson House =

Historic house in Alabama, United States

- N. Q. and Virginia M. Thompson House
- U.S. National Register of Historic Places
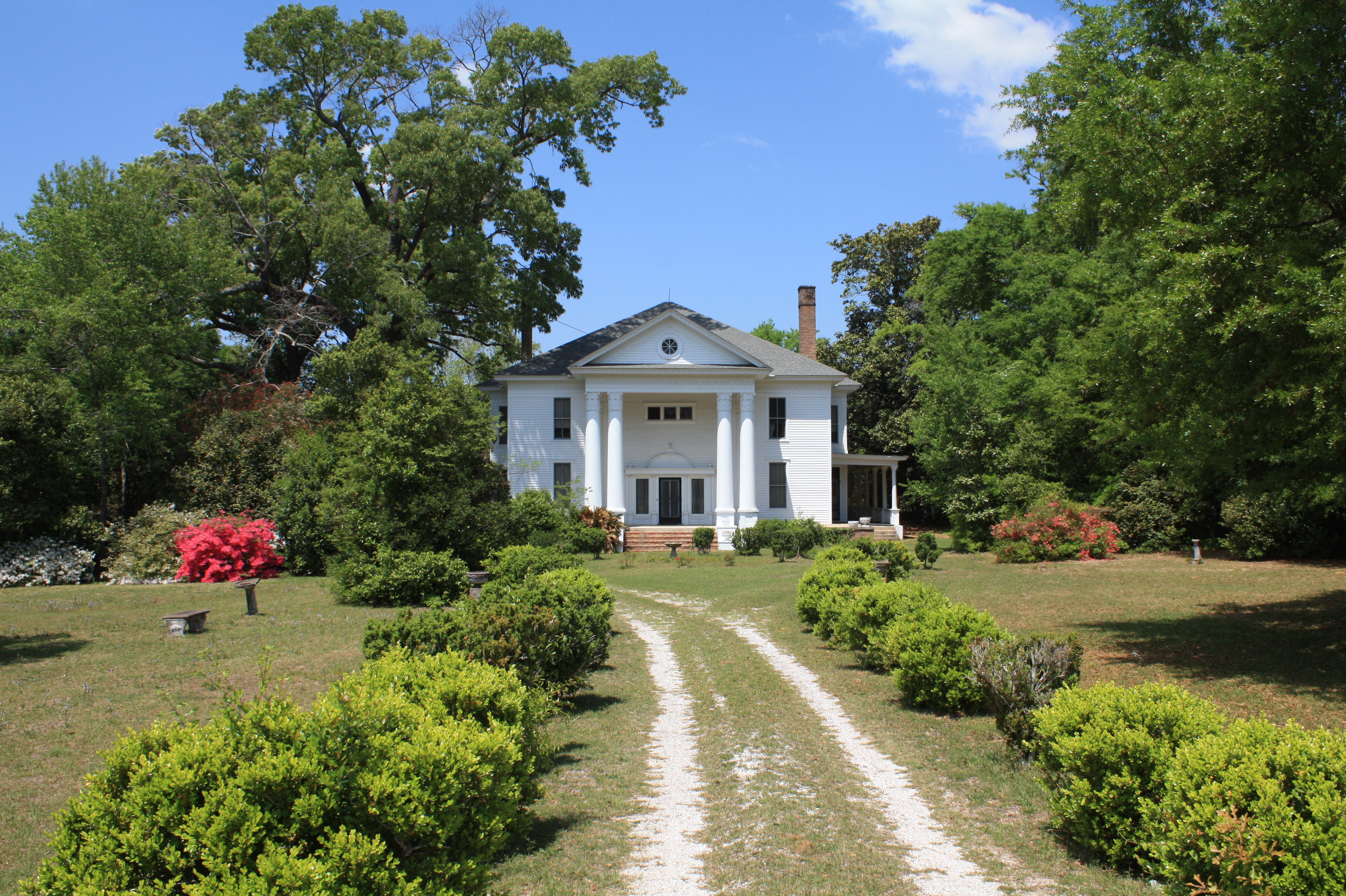
- The Thompson House in 2010

- Location within Alabama Location within the United States
- Location: 105 LeBaron Ave., Citronelle, Alabama
- Coordinates: 31°5′43″N 88°13′43″W
- Area: 2.9 acres (1.2 ha)
- Built: 1905
- Architect: George Tyrell
- Architectural style: Classical Revival
- NRHP reference No.: 89002453
- Added to NRHP: January 25, 1990

The N. Q. and Virginia M. Thompson House is a historic residence in Citronelle, Alabama, United States. The two-story Classical Revival style house was designed by George Tyrell. It was completed in 1905. Due to its architectural significance, it was added to the National Register of Historic Places on January 25, 1990.
