= Central Core Historic District =

Historic district in Alabama, United States

- U.S. National Register of Historic Places
- U.S. Historic district
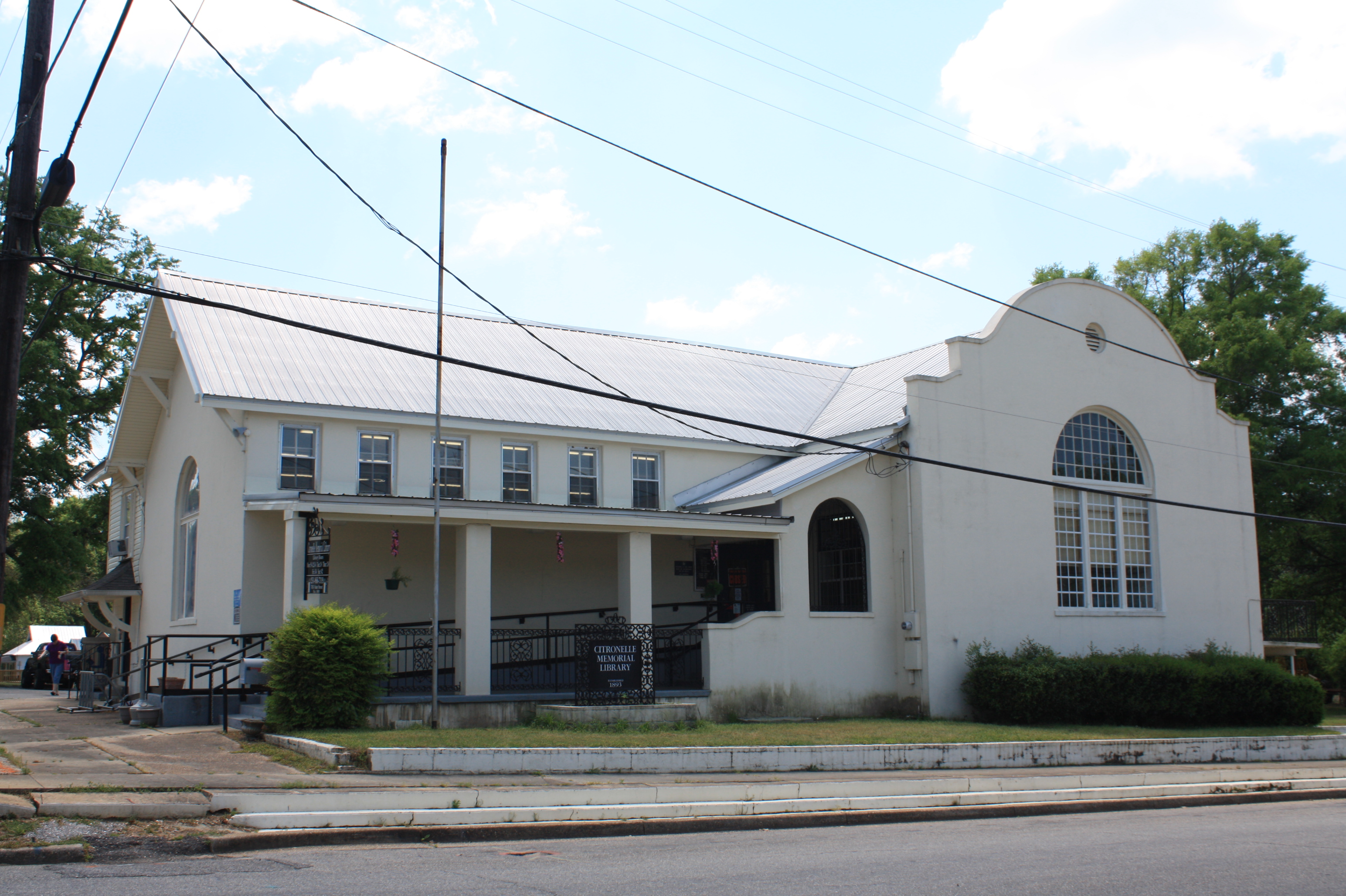
- Citronelle Memorial Library in 2010, part of the Central Core Historic District

- Location within Alabama Location within the United States
- Location: Roughly State and LeBaron from Mobile to Second, Citronelle, Alabama
- Coordinates: 31°5′34″N 88°13′52″W
- Area: 69.9 acres (28.3 ha)
- Architectural style: Late Victorian, Vernacular Victorian
- NRHP reference No.: 89002424
- Added to NRHP: January 25, 1990

The Central Core Historic District is a historic district in Citronelle, Alabama, United States. It is roughly bounded by State Street and LeBaron Avenue from Mobile to Second streets. The district covers 69.9 acres (0.283 km^{2}) and contains 62 contributing properties. It was placed on the National Register of Historic Places on January 25, 1990.
