= Irvington, Alabama =

Unincorporated community in Alabama, United States

- Unincorporated community
- Location within Alabama Location within the United States
- Coordinates: 30°30′24″N 88°14′2″W
- Country: United States
- State: Alabama
- County: Mobile
- Elevation: 131 ft (40 m)
- Time zone: UTC-6 (Central (CST))
  - Summer (DST): UTC-5 (CDT)
- ZIP code: 36544
- Area code: 251

Irvington is an unincorporated community located along U.S. Route 90, east of St. Elmo and north of Bayou La Batre in southwestern Mobile County, Alabama, United States. It has a post office utilizing the 36544 ZIP code and is home to the Mobile International Speedway and Silver King Golf Course.

== History ==
Early in the 20th century, Irvington was a thriving farm community and the center of a lucrative Tung oil (Vernicia fordii) business.

== Geography ==
Irvington is located at 30.50686°N 88.23389°W and has an elevation of 131 feet (40 m).

== Education ==
Mobile County Public School System operates Dixon Elementary School and Alma Bryant High School in the area.

== See also ==
- Mobile International Speedway
