= Charles Denby Garrison Sr. House =

Historic house in Alabama, United States

- U.S. National Register of Historic Places
- Location within Alabama Location within the United States
- Nearest city: Prichard, Alabama
- Coordinates: 30°48′54″N 88°7′58″W
- Built: 1941
- Architectural style: Colonial Revival, Classical Revival, Craftsman
- NRHP reference No.: 09000693
- Added to NRHP: September 9, 2009

The Charles Denby Garrison Sr. House is a historic residence near Prichard, Alabama, United States. The 1 1/2-story house was designed by architect Kenneth R. Giddens for a local lumberman, Charles Denby Garrison Sr. Completed in 1941, the design incorporates elements of the American Craftsman, Colonial Revival, and Classical Revival styles. The architectural landscape in the United States following World War II came to be dominated by modern styles, such as the Ranch-style. Due to its interwar period architectural significance, the house was added to the National Register of Historic Places on September 9, 2009.
