= Barr's Subdivision Historic District =

Historic district in Alabama, United States

- U.S. National Register of Historic Places
- U.S. Historic district
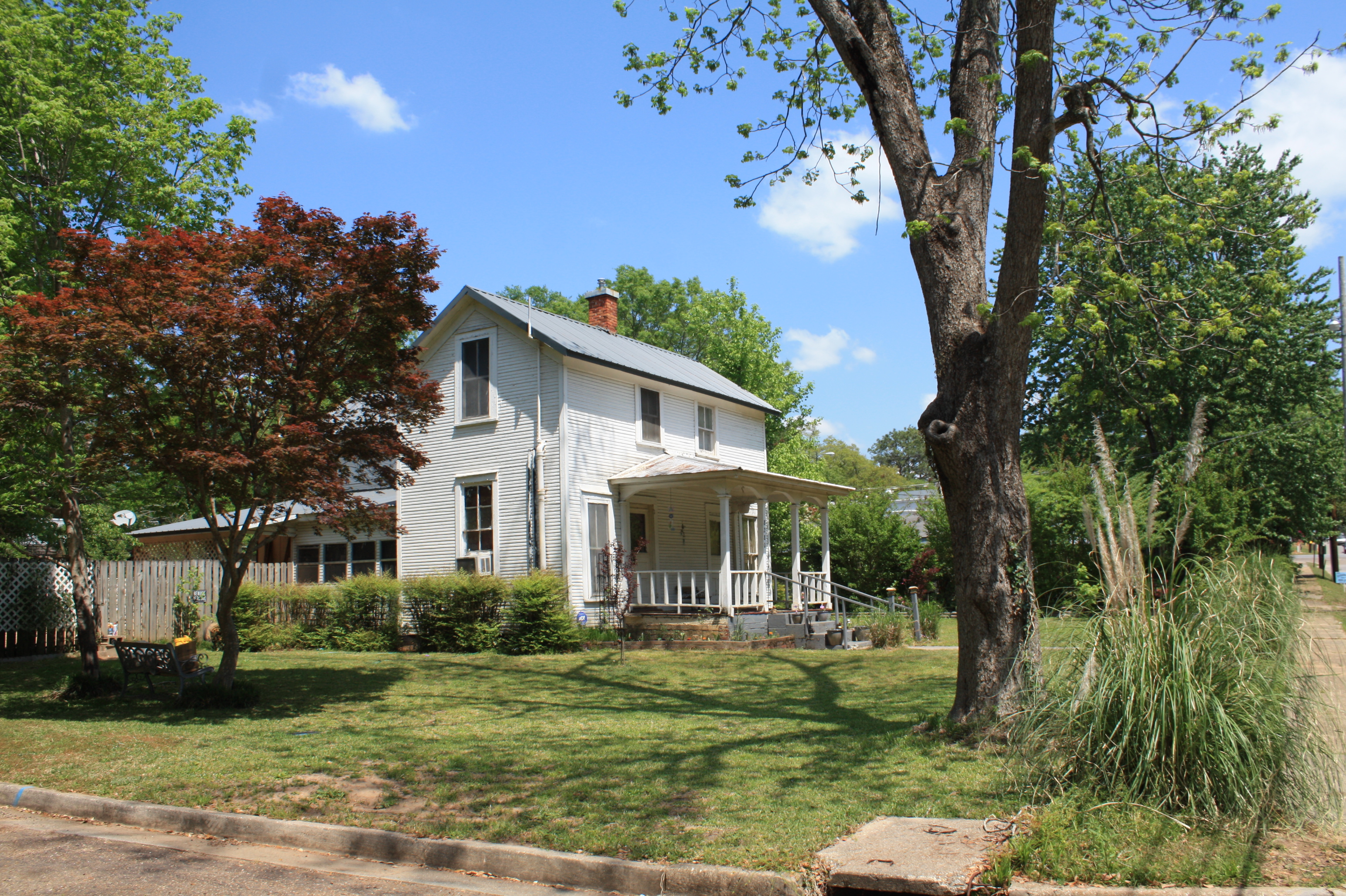
- House at the corner of Howard Avenue and State Street

- Location within Alabama Location within the United States
- Location: Roughly along US 45 and Howard Ave. between LeBaron and State, Citronelle, Alabama
- Coordinates: 31°5′33″N 88°14′20″W
- Area: 5.9 acres (2.4 ha)
- Architectural style: Late 19th And Early 20th Century American Movements, Late Victorian
- NRHP reference No.: 89002452
- Added to NRHP: January 25, 1990

Barr's Subdivision Historic District is a historic district in Citronelle, Alabama, United States. It is roughly bounded by U.S. Route 45 and Howard Avenue between LeBaron Avenue and State Street. The district covers 5.9 acres (0.024 km^{2}) and contains seven contributing properties. It was placed on the National Register of Historic Places on July 7, 2005.
