= Dauphin Island School =

Historic building on Dauphin Island, Alabama, United States

- U.S. National Register of Historic Places
- Location within Alabama Location within the United States
- Location: 1016 Bienville Boulevard, Dauphin Island, Alabama
- Coordinates: 30°15′17″N 88°06′52″W
- Built: 1931
- NRHP reference No.: 100001878
- Added to NRHP: June 28, 2018

The Dauphin Island School (also known as the Little Red Schoolhouse) is a historic former school building on Dauphin Island, Alabama. The school was built in 1931 to replace a one-room schoolhouse that was built in 1898 and burned in 1929. Originally sited on the east end of the island, it was moved to the western side in 1956. The structure has a central hallway with two classrooms on either side (one of the classrooms was later repurposed into the principal's office and a conference room) and two restrooms at the rear. A 1991 addition included a library and cafeteria.

The school remained in use until 2016. It was relocated closer to its original site the next year, and today serves as a welcome center, museum, and library. The building was listed on the National Register of Historic Places in 2018.
