= Grand Bay, Alabama =

- Census-designated place
- Motto: "A community in action"
- Location in Mobile County and the state of Alabama
- Coordinates: 30°28′09″N 88°21′43″W
- Country: United States
- State: Alabama
- County: Mobile

Area
  - Total: 8.70 sq mi (22.53 km^{2})
  - Land: 8.68 sq mi (22.47 km^{2})
  - Water: 0.023 sq mi (0.06 km^{2})
- Elevation: 89 ft (27 m)

Population (2020)
  - Total: 3,460
  - Density: 398.8/sq mi (153.99/km^{2})
- Time zone: UTC-6 (Central (CST))
  - Summer (DST): UTC-5 (CDT)
- ZIP code: 36541
- Area code: 251
- FIPS code: 01-31024
- GNIS feature ID: 2402543

Grand Bay is an unincorporated community and census-designated place (CDP) in southwest Mobile County, Alabama, United States. It is part of the Mobile metropolitan area. The population was 3,460 at the 2020 census.

== History ==
According to local accounts, George Cassibry was the first person to settle in Grand Bay. He came to the area in 1853, establishing a home site near the headwaters of Franklin Creek located today near the intersection of Highway 90 and Ramsey Road. Exploration and settlement of the area was well underway by the mid-nineteenth century.

During the Civil War, the town saw brief military action as a column of troops under U.S. General Gordon Granger reached the town as a preliminary move in the siege of Mobile. In 1870 the U.S. Postal Service established a post office at a location near the center of the current community.

Settlement began in earnest when the Grand Bay Land Company began offering ten-acre lots for sale in the early 1900s. The lots were marketed to people living in and around Chicago and other northern cities as a way to live self-sufficiently in a mild climate. Supposedly, ten acres planted in pecan and satsuma trees would be enough to supply the needs of anyone. The timber industry also attracted many to the area. Much of the region south of Grand Bay to the coast along the Mississippi Sound was clearcut.

For a time, the town flourished. A weekly newspaper was published there, and telegraph service was offered to the region through an operator at Grand Bay. The town had a number of businesses including a hotel, drug store, several general merchandise stores and a bank. However, hurricanes in 1906 and 1910, along with a severe freeze, sent many scurrying back north. Their efforts, however, have not gone unnoticed even today. Cogon grass, a highly-invasive rhizome, first introduced to the area as packing material in satsuma trees imported from Asia, has now become a serious Southeastern agricultural problem.

In 1993, the old Grand Bay State Bank building became the temporary site of the El Cazador Museum, and held treasure from the El Cazador. The area in and around the old bank building now forms the Grand Bay Historic District and is listed on the National Register of Historic Places.

== Geography ==
Grand Bay is located in southwestern Mobile County along U.S. Route 90, a few miles inland from the Mississippi Sound. US 90 leads northeast 26 miles (42 km) to Mobile and southwest 16 miles (26 km) to Pascagoula, Mississippi. The Mississippi state line is 3 miles (5 km) west of Grand Bay. Alabama State Route 188 leads southeast from Grand Bay 8 miles (13 km) to Bayou La Batre and 26 miles (42 km) to Dauphin Island.

According to the United States Census Bureau, the Grand Bay CDP has a total area of 8.7 square miles (23 km^{2}), of which 0.02 square miles (0.052 km^{2}), or 0.23% are water. The community drains north to Franklin Creek and south to a tributary of it; Franklin Creek flows west to the Escatawpa River in Mississippi, part of the Pascagoula River watershed.

== Demographics ==
Historical population
Census	Pop.	Note	%±
1980	3,185		—
1990	3,383		6.2%
2000	3,918		15.8%
2010	3,672		−6.3%
2020	3,460		−5.8%
U.S. Decennial Census

=== Racial and ethnic composition ===
Grand Bay CDP, Alabama – Racial and ethnic composition Note: the US Census treats Hispanic/Latino as an ethnic category. This table excludes Latinos from the racial categories and assigns them to a separate category. Hispanics/Latinos may be of any race.
Race / Ethnicity (NH = Non-Hispanic)	Pop 1980	Pop 1990	Pop 2000	Pop 2010	Pop 2020	% 1980	% 1990	% 2000	% 2010	% 2020
White alone (NH)	2,812	2,975	3,463	3,144	2,891	88.29%	87.94%	88.39%	85.62%	83.55%
Black or African American alone (NH)	311	350	347	343	323	9.76%	10.35%	8.86%	9.34%	9.34%
Native American or Alaska Native alone (NH)	6	13	8	21	12	0.19%	0.38%	0.20%	0.57%	0.35%
Asian alone (NH)	0	12	30	26	49	0.00%	0.35%	0.77%	0.71%	1.42%
Native Hawaiian or Pacific Islander alone (NH)	x	x	2	1	0	x	x	0.05%	0.03%	0.00%
Other race alone (NH)	0	0	2	3	9	0.00%	0.00%	0.05%	0.08%	0.26%
Mixed race or Multiracial (NH)	x	x	32	51	112	x	x	0.82%	1.39%	3.24%
Hispanic or Latino (any race)	56	33	34	83	64	1.76%	0.98%	0.87%	2.26%	1.85%
Total	3,185	3,383	3,918	3,672	3,460	100.00%	100.00%	100.00%	100.00%	100.00%

=== 2020 census ===
As of the 2020 census, Grand Bay had a population of 3,460, with 1,067 families residing in the CDP. The median age was 42.4 years. 22.1% of residents were under the age of 18 and 19.8% were 65 years of age or older. For every 100 females there were 96.9 males, and for every 100 females age 18 and over there were 94.7 males age 18 and over.

0.0% of residents lived in urban areas, while 100.0% lived in rural areas.

There were 1,282 households in Grand Bay, of which 31.1% had children under the age of 18 living in them. Of all households, 52.0% were married-couple households, 15.5% were households with a male householder and no spouse or partner present, and 25.4% were households with a female householder and no spouse or partner present. About 22.1% of all households were made up of individuals, and 10.1% had someone living alone who was 65 years of age or older.

There were 1,463 housing units, of which 12.4% were vacant. The homeowner vacancy rate was 2.0% and the rental vacancy rate was 17.7%.

=== 2010 census ===
As of the census of 2010, there were 3,672 people, 1,339 households, and 1,021 families residing in the CDP. The population density was 420 inhabitants per square mile (160/km^{2}). There were 1,498 housing units at an average density of 172.2 per square mile (66.5/km^{2}). The racial makeup of the CDP was 86.9% White, 9.4% Black or African American, 0.6% Native American, 0.7% Asian, 0.0% Pacific Islander, 0.7% from other races, and 1.7% from two or more races. Hispanics or Latinos of any race were 2.3% of the population.

There were 1,339 households, out of which 29.9% had children under the age of 18 living with them, 56.5% were married couples living together, 14.8% had a female householder with no husband present, and 23.7% were non-families. 19.9% of all households were made up of individuals, and 5.2% had someone living alone who was 65 years of age or older. The average household size was 2.68 and the average family size was 3.07.

In the CDP, the population was spread out, with 23.8% under the age of 18, 8.2% from 18 to 24, 24.1% from 25 to 44, 28.0% from 45 to 64, and 15.9% who were 65 years of age or older. The median age was 40.4 years. For every 100 females, there were 98.8 males. For every 100 females age 18 and over, there were 96.5 males.

The median income for a household in the CDP was $47,722, and the median income for a family was $52,353. Males had a median income of $42,057 versus $27,277 for females. The per capita income for the CDP was $21,141. About 9.8% of families and 13.8% of the population were below the poverty line, including 23.0% of those under age 18 and 3.1% of those age 65 or over.

=== 2000 census ===
As of the census of 2000, there were 3,918 people, 1,364 households, and 1,078 families residing in the CDP. The population density was 452.3 inhabitants per square mile (174.6/km^{2}). There were 1,441 housing units at an average density of 166.4 per square mile (64.2/km^{2}). The racial makeup of the CDP was 89.00% White, 8.88% Black or African American, 0.23% Native American, 0.79% Asian, 0.05% Pacific Islander, 0.13% from other races, and 0.92% from two or more races. Hispanic or Latino of any race were 0.87% of the population.

There were 1,364 households, out of which 37.5% had children under the age of 18 living with them, 65.5% were married couples living together, 10.0% had a female householder with no husband present, and 20.9% were non-families. 18.1% of all households were made up of individuals, and 6.9% had someone living alone who was 65 years of age or older. The average household size was 2.81 and the average family size was 3.19.

In the CDP, the population was spread out, with 27.7% under the age of 18, 9.2% from 18 to 24, 27.1% from 25 to 44, 23.3% from 45 to 64, and 12.7% who were 65 years of age or older. The median age was 36 years. For every 100 females, there were 100.0 males. For every 100 females age 18 and over, there were 95.6 males.

The median income for a household in the CDP was $38,941, and the median income for a family was $43,654. Males had a median income of $33,177 versus $21,920 for females. The per capita income for the CDP was $15,741. About 6.9% of families and 8.1% of the population were below the poverty line, including 7.1% of those under age 18 and 7.8% of those age 65 or over.

== Government and local services ==
While Grand Bay is unincorporated, the area is served by the Grand Bay Water Works Board for water service and an active volunteer fire department for fire protection. Grand Bay Water Works also provides limited sewer service for Breitling Elementary School and the business district around the Interstate 10 exchange. The Mobile County Commission, a three-member elected panel, provides all other services including road and street repair.

Grand Bay is located within District 3 of the Mobile County Commission, which is represented by current commissioner Randall Dueitt (R). In the Alabama Legislature, Grand Bay is located within House District 105, whose current representative is Chip Brown (R). In the State Senate, Grand Bay is located within District 35, which is currently represented by David Sessions (R), a native of Grand Bay.

In the US House, Grand Bay, and all of Mobile County is located within the 1st Congressional District, which is currently represented by Jerry Carl (R).

== Watermelon Festival ==
A July 4 tradition since 1973, the current version of the Grand Bay Watermelon Festival offers tourists and locals an opportunity to sample locally grown watermelon while enjoying local music, arts & crafts, and informative displays from area merchants and service providers.

The annual celebration has a long and storied history, having begun during the earliest years of the 20th Century. As the community and surrounding area changed during World War II, the annual celebration was discontinued. It was revived in 1973 by the Grand Bay Junior Chamber of Commerce. Currently, it is sponsored by the Grand Bay Independent Order of Odd Fellows #73. It is currently held at the Odd Fellows Festival Park and local baseball park just north of U.S. Highway 90 on the west side of Grand Bay. It begins on July 3 from 3-7 p.m. and continues on July 4 from 10 a.m. and concludes at 6 p.m. There is also a fantastic fireworks show that starts at dusk (about 8:15 p.m.) The website for the Grand Bay Watermelon Festival is: www.grandbaywatermelonfestival.org.

== Pecans and fruit ==
Much of the rural land around Grand Bay is planted in pecan trees, another reminder of the Grand Bay Land Company days. Many of the pecan orchards have been converted from agricultural production for use as residential home sites. However, pecan production is still an important business and provides supplemental income to residents who work in nonagricultural jobs.

In addition, the area has become home to a large peach business and satsumas, once destroyed by freezing temperatures, have now returned to commercial production in a more weather-hardy variety.

Grand Bay watermelons, however, remain the produce most identified with the community.

== Community center ==
The Grand Bay-St. Elmo Community Center is a multi-use facility located on the east side of Grand Bay at 11610 Highway 90. The building is near the intersection of Highway 90 and Ramsay Road Extension. Constructed in 2005, the center operates on a non-profit basis. Facilities are available for rent to the public. The center is located on the site of the former Grand Bay Elementary School for Colored, a racially segregated elementary school established in 1919.

== Economy ==
The business section of Grand Bay stretches east to west along Highway 90 for about two miles from Festival Park Road on the west side to Highway 188 on the east, and north to south along Grand Bay Wilmer Road from Highway 90 to Old Pascagoula Road. Recent development has centered on two areas, primarily at the intersection of Grand Bay-Wilmer Road and US 90, and at the intersection of Grand Bay-Wilmer Road and Interstate 10.

== Education ==
Mobile County Public Schools operates area public schools. Some residents are zoned to Breitling Elementary School while others are zoned to Cora Castlen Elementary School. All residents are zoned to Grand Bay Middle School and Alma Bryant High School in Irvington.

== Notable people ==
- Taylor Harper, former state legislator and current lobbyist
- Melinda Haynes, award-winning author
- Bob Henley, MLB player for Montreal Expos
- Joe Hilley, New York Times best-selling author
- Don Hultz, NFL player
- David Sessions, member Alabama House of Representatives
- Harold Page Smith, United States Navy admiral
- August P. Trovaioli, educator, artist and art historian
- Mark Woodyard, MLB player for Detroit Tigers

== See also ==
- Grand Bay National Wildlife Refuge
- Grand Bay Savanna Little River Road Addition State Nature Preserve
