= Tanner Farmhouse =

Historic house in Alabama, United States

- U.S. National Register of Historic Places
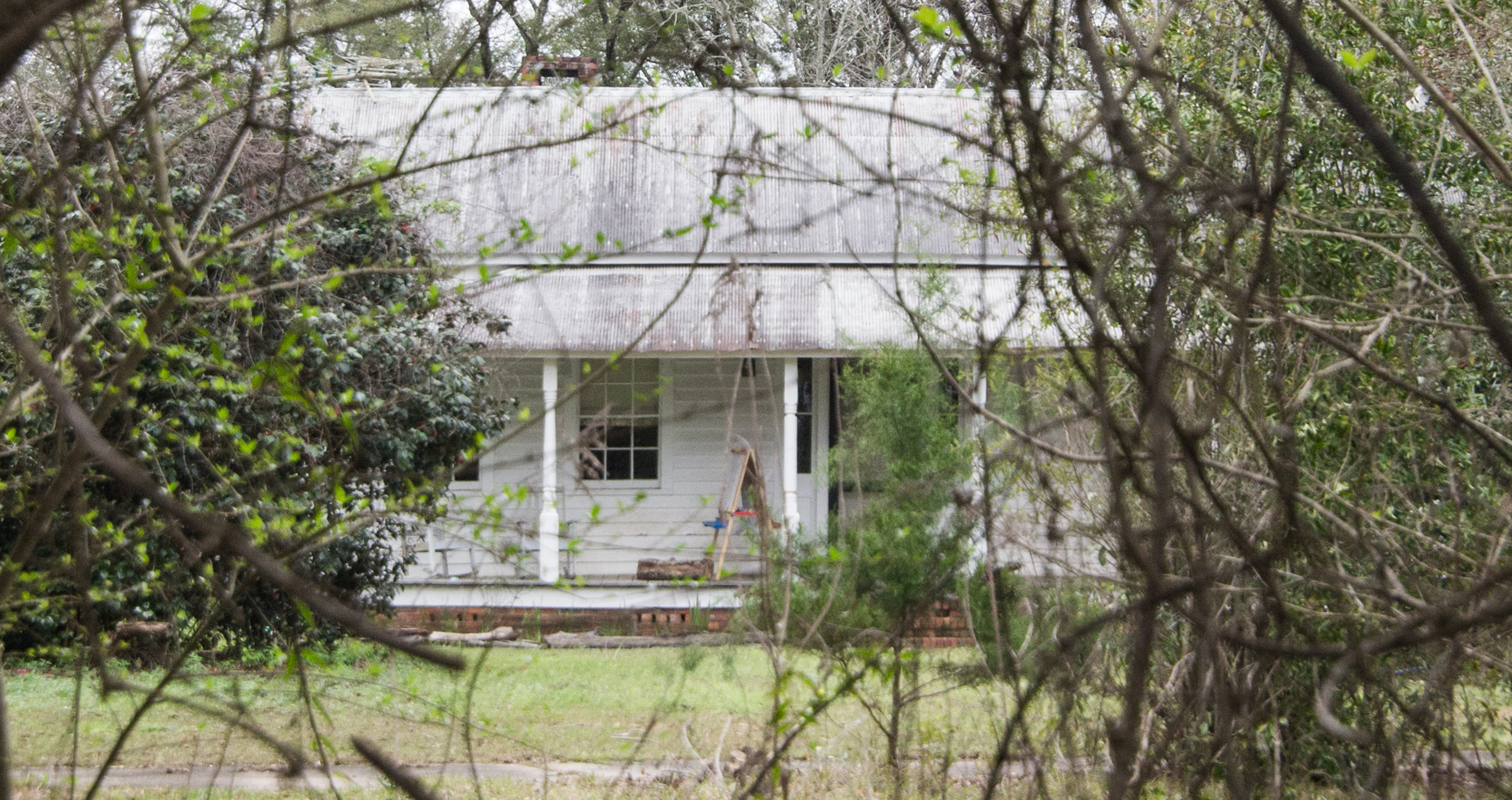

- Location within Alabama Location within the United States
- Nearest city: Wilmer, Alabama
- Coordinates: 30°50′7″N 88°21′51″W
- Area: 2.5 acres (1.0 ha)
- Built: 1886
- Architect: Joseph A. Fills
- NRHP reference No.: 08000429
- Added to NRHP: May 20, 2008

The Tanner Farmhouse is a historic residence near Wilmer, Alabama, United States. Completed in 1886, the one-story house was designed by Joseph A. Fills. Due to its architectural significance, it was added to the National Register of Historic Places on May 20, 2008.
