= Grand Bay National Wildlife Refuge =

United States National Wildlife Refuge in Mississippi

- IUCN category IV (habitat/species management area)
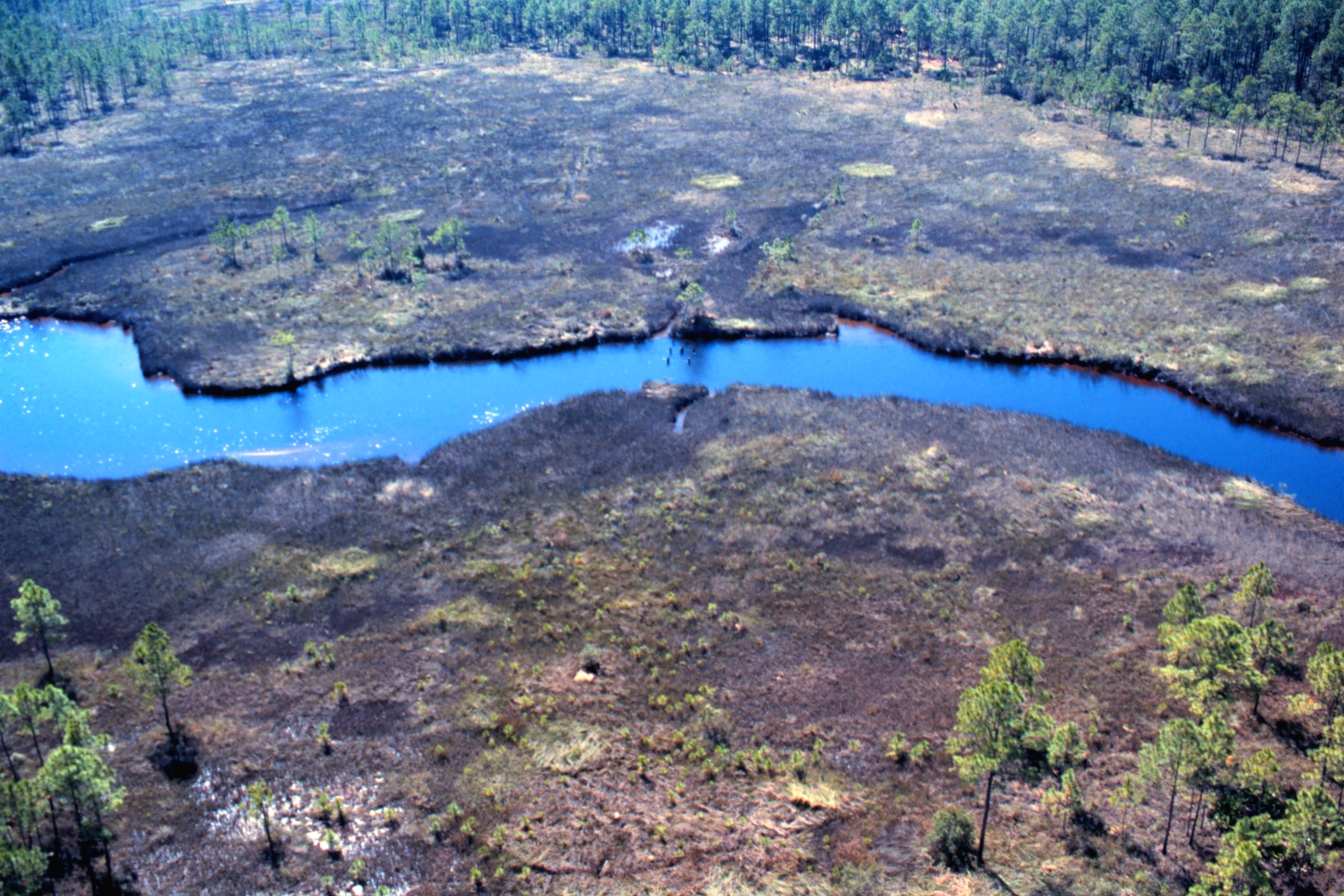
- West over Bayou Heron showing pilings from old logging road bridge in center of photo. Grand Bay, Mississippi

- Location within the United States
- Location: Mobile County, Alabama, Jackson County, Mississippi, United States
- Nearest city: Grand Bay, Alabama
- Coordinates: 30.41583°N 88.41972°W
- Area: 32,000 acres (130 km^{2})
- Established: 1992
- Governing body: U.S. Fish and Wildlife Service
- Website: Grand Bay National Wildlife Refuge

Grand Bay National Wildlife Refuge was established in 1992 under the Emergency Wetlands Resources Act of 1986 to protect one of the largest expanses of undisturbed pine savanna habitats in the Gulf Coastal Plain region. The refuge is located near Grand Bay, Alabama in Mobile County, Alabama and Jackson County, Mississippi, and when complete will encompass over 32,000 acres (130 km^{2}). The refuge is part of the National Wildlife Refuge system. The Refuge Complex Manager also administers the Mississippi Sandhill Crane National Wildlife Refuge and Bon Secour National Wildlife Refuge. Access to refuge lands (especially interior portions) is limited, but is available mostly on the Mississippi side and by boat.

== Habitat ==
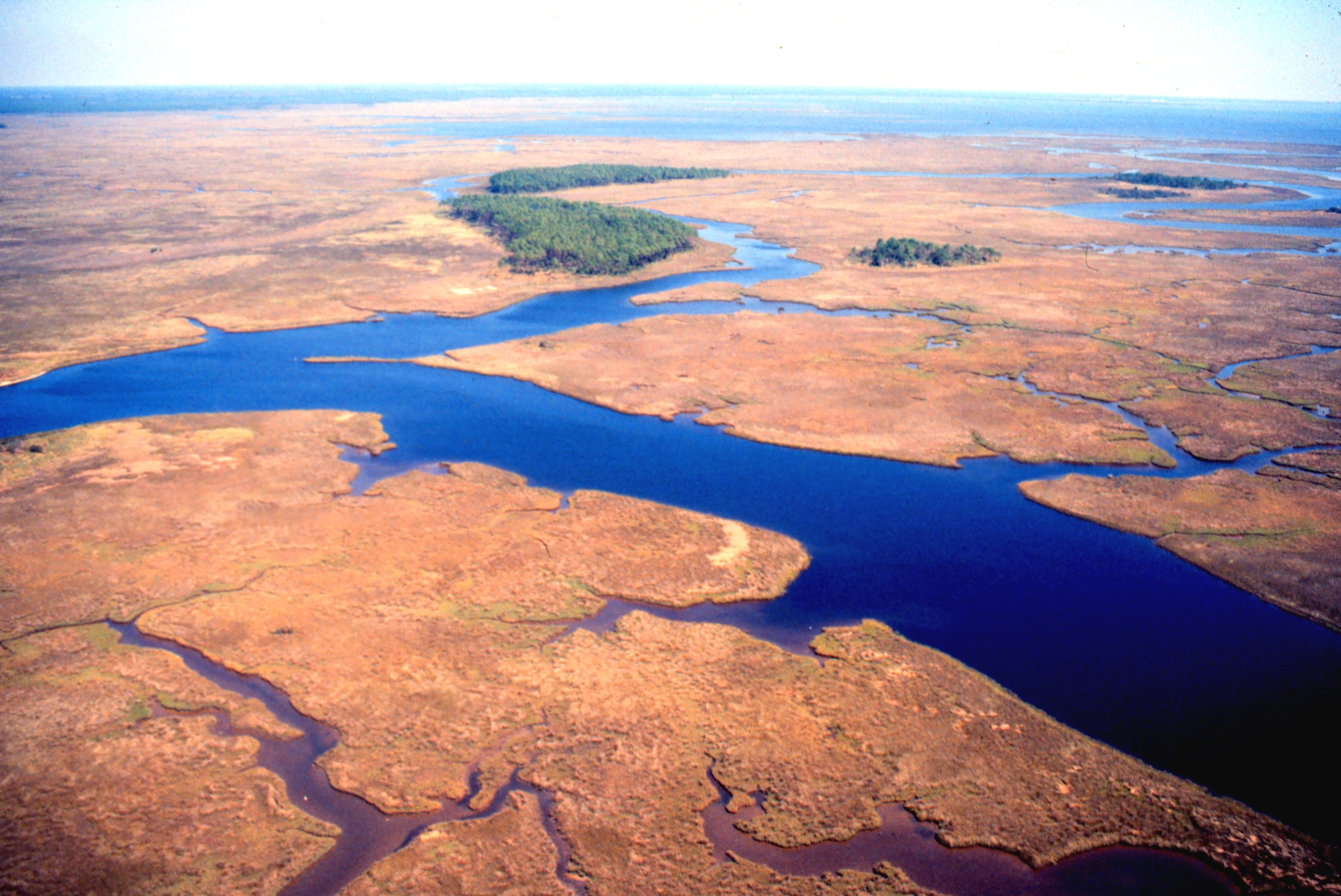
East over Bayou Cumbest looking east showing maritime pine islands on Crooked Bayou

The habitat is varied and includes wet pine savannah, maritime forest, tidal flats, nontidal wetlands, salt pans, salt marshes, bays and bayous.

== Research ==
Research projects include studying the ecological effects of rising sea levels, the ecology of vertebrates in tidal marshes, the ecology of the reserves habitats, monitoring the effects of mercury pollution, coastal plant ecology and mapping, and monitoring environmental conditions on a long-term basis.

== Flora and fauna ==
The varied parts of the refuge provide suitable habitat for many migrant and resident species of bird. These include the scarlet tanager, the black-throated green warbler, the black-and-white warbler, the eastern towhee, the gray catbird, the painted bunting and the secretive white-eyed vireo.

Nine species of carnivorous plants including pitcher plants, butterworts and sundews are present in the reserve. These plants have modifications which enable them to catch insects which provides the nitrogen they need that is deficient in their swampy habitat.
