= St. Elmo, Alabama =

Unincorporated community in Alabama, United States

- Unincorporated community
- Location within Alabama Location within the United States
- Coordinates: 30°30′13″N 088°15′15″W
- Country: United States
- State: Alabama
- County: Mobile
- Elevation: 135 ft (41 m)
- Time zone: UTC-6 (Central (CST))
  - Summer (DST): UTC-5 (CDT)
- ZIP code: 36568
- Area code: 251
- GNIS ID: 126090

St. Elmo is an unincorporated community in Mobile County, Alabama, United States. It is located approximately 7 miles (11 km) due north of Bayou La Batre and the Mississippi Sound and approximately 10 miles east of Grand Bay.

== Geography ==
St. Elmo is located at 30°30′13″N 088°15′15″W. The elevation is 135 feet (41 m). Most of the town lies along U.S. Highway 90.

== History ==
Originally a farming community, the town was served by the L&N Railroad which provided passenger and freight depots. The town derives its name from the book of the same name, authored by Augusta Evans Wilson.

It is rumored that Jesse James and his gang once hid out in St. Elmo after one of his robberies, assuming aliases while hiding out, but this has yet to be confirmed.

An airfield located just north of Highway 90, west of town was an outlying field of Brookley Air Force Base in Mobile. It was used for training flights during World War II. The airfield is now owned by the State of Alabama.

== Education ==
Mobile County Public School System operates the following schools serving the area: St. Elmo Elementary School, Hankins Middle School, and Theodore High School in Theodore.

St. Elmo High School was one of only two exclusively African American high schools in Mobile County, prior to desegregation of the public schools in the area. African American elementary students attended the Grand Bay Elementary School for Colored, located west of town near Grand Bay. The high school was closed in 1970 when its students combined with the schools in Grand Bay. The St. Elmo school re-opened as an integrated public elementary school in 1987, and continues to operate today as St. Elmo Elementary School, under the Mobile County Public School System.
