= Mauvilla, Alabama =

Unincorporated community in Alabama, United States

- Unincorporated community
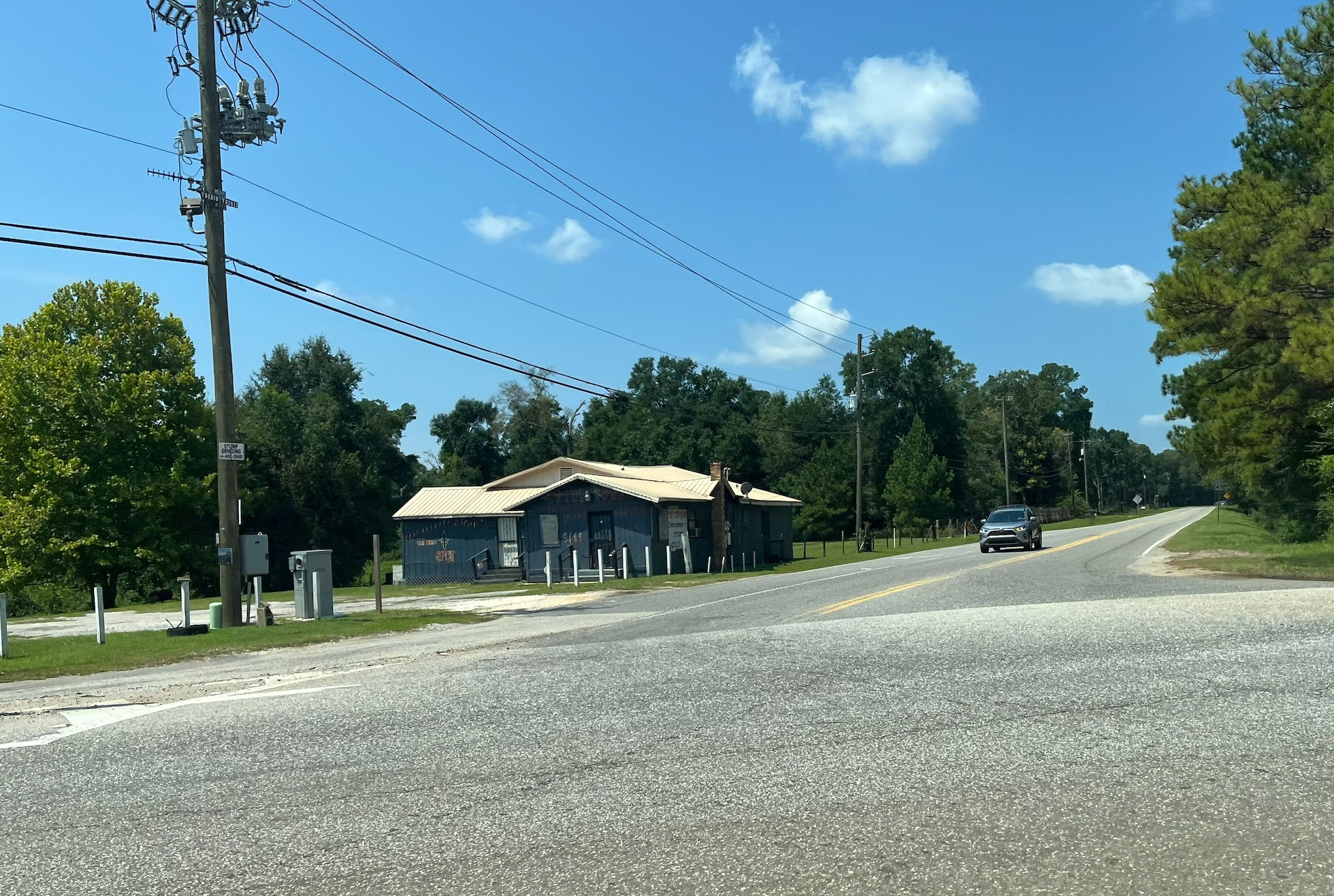
- Building in Mauvilla

- Location within Alabama Location within the United States
- Coordinates: -AL_type:city_source:GNIS 30°50′13″N 088°11′04″W
- Country: United States
- State: Alabama
- County: Mobile
- Elevation: 157 ft (48 m)
- Time zone: UTC-6 (Central (CST))
  - Summer (DST): UTC-5 (CDT)
- Area code: 251
- GNIS ID: 122399

Mauvilla is an unincorporated community in Mobile County, Alabama, United States. A post office operated under the name Mauvilla in 1856 and from 1895 to 1912.

== Geography ==
Mauvilla is located at 30°50′13″N 088°11′04″W at an elevation of 157 feet (48 m).
