= Coden, Alabama =

Unincorporated community in Alabama, United States

- Unincorporated community
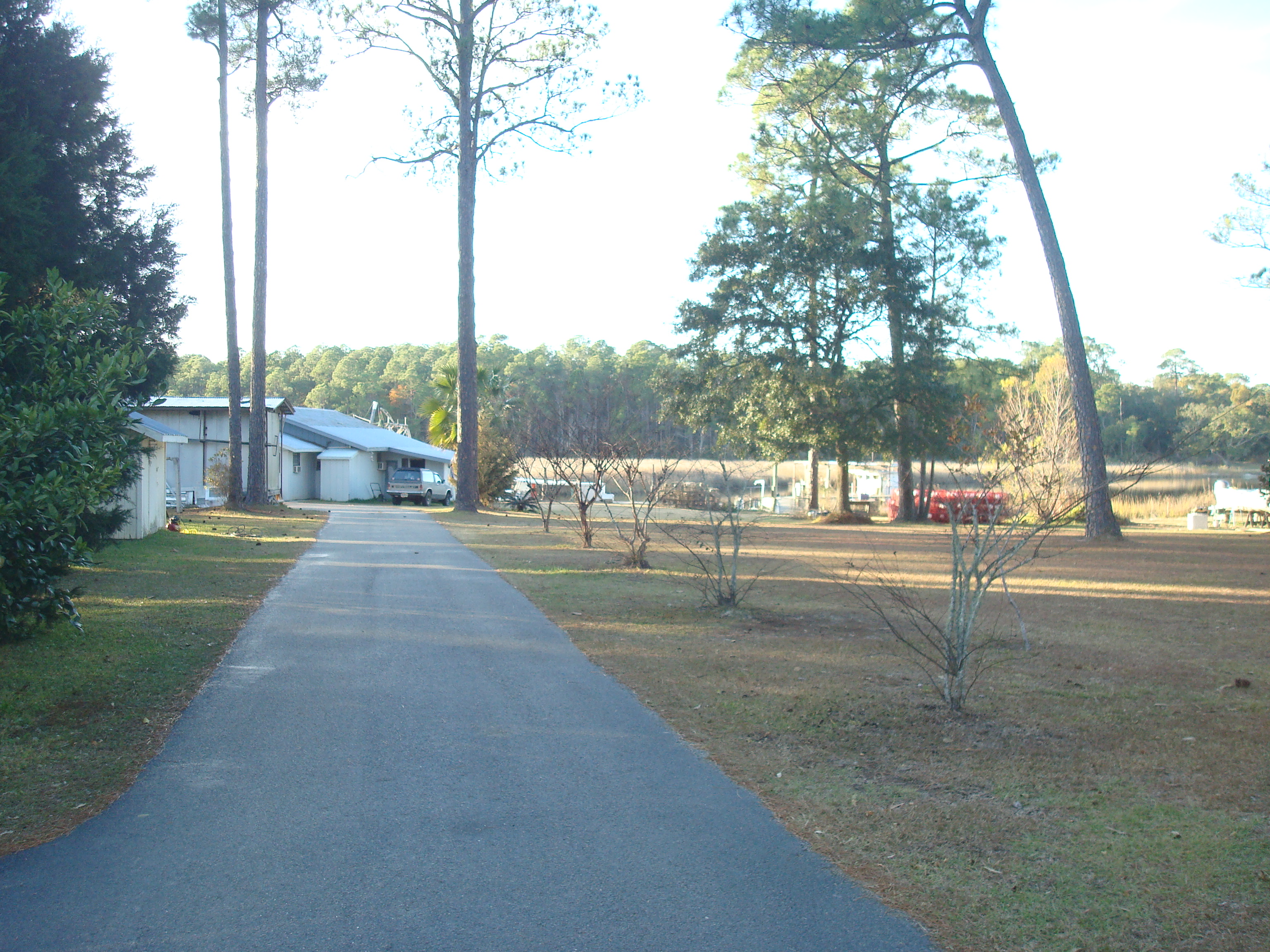
- Coden, Alabama

- Location within Alabama Location within the United States
- Coordinates: 30°22′59″N 88°14′18″W
- Country: United States
- State: Alabama
- County: Mobile
- Elevation: 7 ft (2.1 m)
- Time zone: UTC-6 (Central (CST))
  - Summer (DST): UTC-5 (CDT)
- ZIP code: 36523
- Area code: 251

Coden is an unincorporated community coastal fishing village in southern Mobile County, Alabama, United States. Located near Bayou la Batre, it lies across the Mississippi Sound from Dauphin Island.

== History ==
The name of the community is derived from Bayou Coden, the bayou that it is situated upon. Bayou Coden is an English translation of the original French name, Coq d' Inde. Beginning in the late 1800s the area became known for its resorts, but a hurricane in 1906 ended the hotel business.

== Geography ==
Coden is located at 30°22′59″N 88°14′18″W and has an elevation of 7 feet (2 m).
