= Bayou La Batre, Alabama =

City in Alabama, United States

- City (Note: Per the Code of Alabama 1975, Section 11-40-6, a municipality with a population of 2,000 or more is a city, while less than 2,000 is a town.)
- Flag Seal

- Location of in Mobile County, Alabama
- Coordinates: 30°24′34″N 88°15′05″W
- Country: United States
- State: Alabama
- County: Mobile

Government
  - Type: Mayor-Council
  - Mayor: Henry Barnes

Area
  - Total: 7.63 sq mi (19.77 km^{2})
  - Land: 7.49 sq mi (19.40 km^{2})
  - Water: 0.14 sq mi (0.37 km^{2})
- Elevation: 10 ft (3.0 m)

Population (2020)
  - Total: 2,204
  - Density: 294.3/sq mi (113.62/km^{2})
- Time zone: UTC-6 (Central (CST))
  - Summer (DST): UTC-5 (CDT)
- ZIP code: 36509
- Area code: 251
- FIPS code: 01-04684
- GNIS feature ID: 2403828
- Website: cityofbayoulabatre.com

Bayou La Batre (/ˌbaɪ.oʊ lə ˈbætri/ or locally /ˌbaɪlə ˈbætri/) is a city in Mobile County, Alabama, United States. It is part of the Mobile metropolitan area. As of the 2020 census, the population was 2,204, down from 2,558 at the 2010 census.

Bayou La Batre is a fishing village with a seafood-processing harbor for fishing boats and shrimp boats. The local chamber of commerce has described the city as the "Seafood Capital of Alabama" for packaging seafood from hundreds of fishing boats.

== History ==
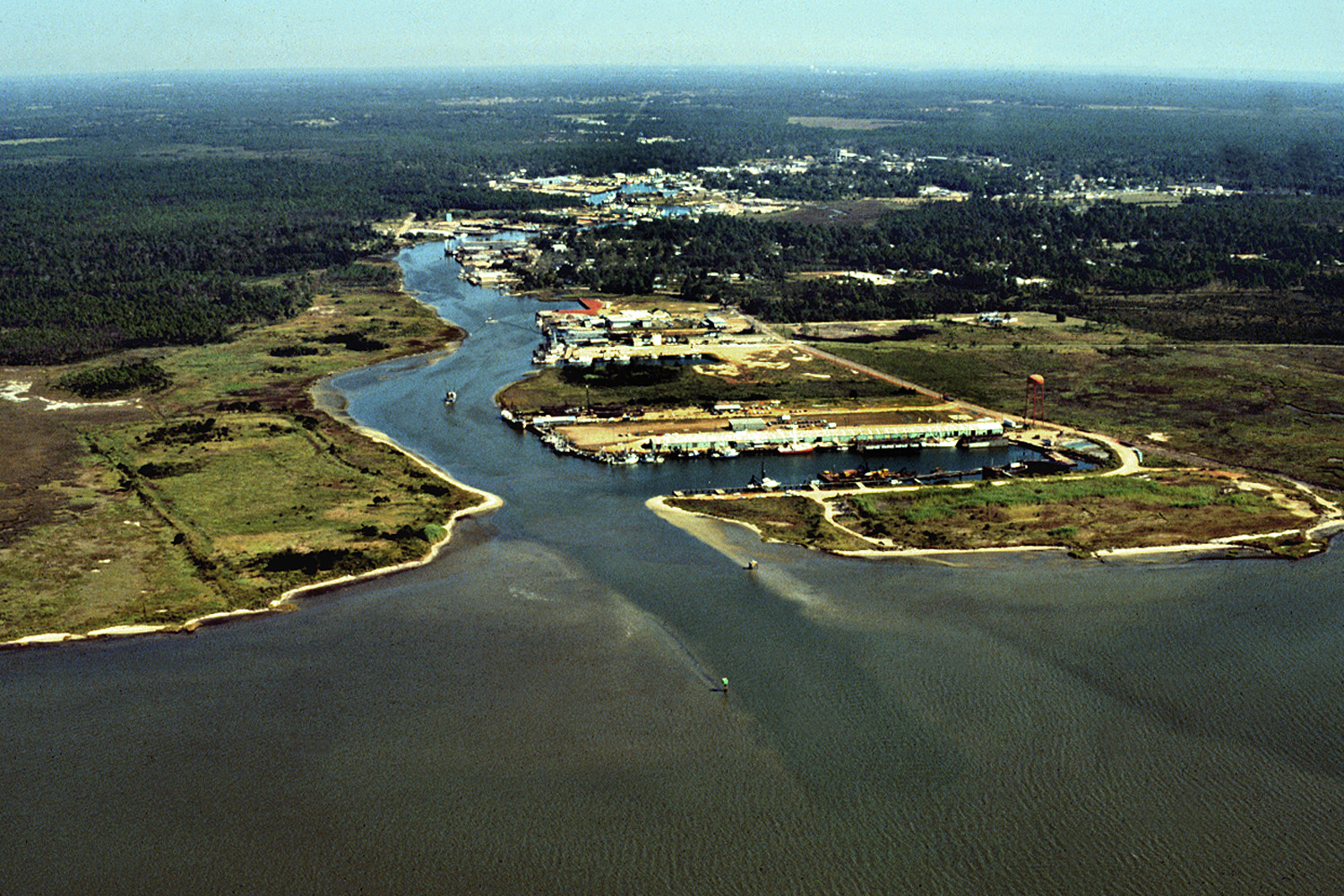
Aerial view of Bayou La Batre from the harbor entrance on the Gulf of Mexico.

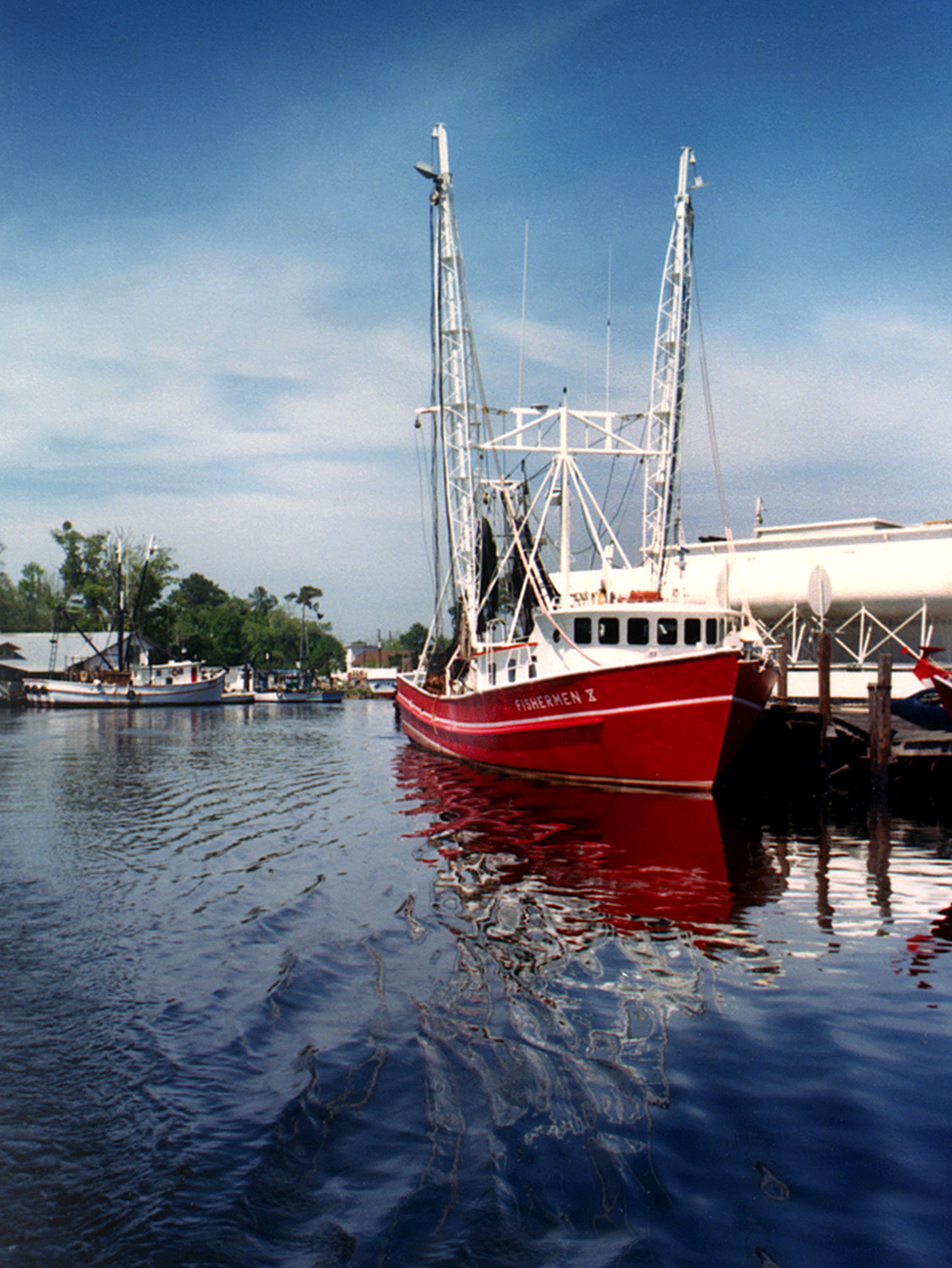
A fishing boat at the dock

As part of the French settlement of the Gulf Coast, the bayou was originally called "Riviere D'Erbane" and acquired the present name from the French-maintained battery of artillery on the west bank ("bayou of the battery"). Bayou La Batre was the first permanent settlement on the south Mobile County mainland and was founded in 1786, when Joseph Bouzage (Bosarge) [1733-95] moved into the area and was awarded a 1,259-acre (509 ha) Spanish land grant on the bayou's west bank.

Born in Poitiers, France, Joseph Bouzage came to the Gulf Coast circa 1760, married Catherine Louise Baudreau (Boudreau) on June 5, 1762, and was the father of seven children, including one son, Jean Baptiste.

Bayou La Batre was founded in 1786, when French-born Joseph Bouzage (or Bosarge) [1733-1795] was awarded a 1,259-acre (509 ha) Spanish land grant on the West Bank of the bayou. The modern city of Bayou La Batre was incorporated in 1955.

=== Hurricane Katrina ===
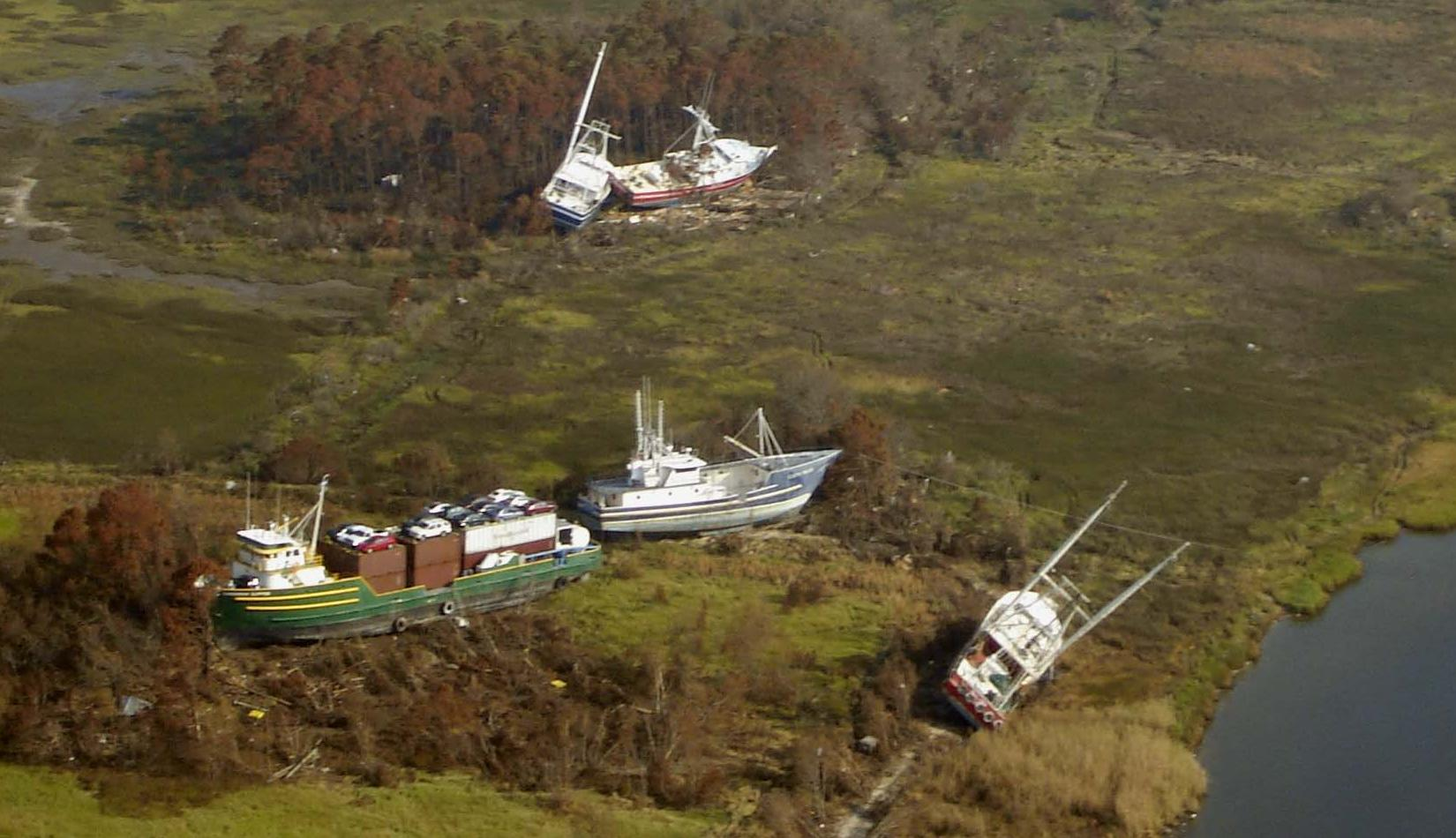
Cargo ship and boats aground at Bayou La Batre after Hurricane Katrina. The M/V Caribbean Clipper (left) was unloaded by crane six months later and refloated.

On August 29, 2005, the area was devastated by Hurricane Katrina, with a local storm surge of nearly 16-foot (5 m) and higher waves that engulfed Bayou La Batre and pushed over 23 shrimp boats and the cargo ship M/V Caribbean Clipper onto shore. The captain rode out Katrina on the 179-foot (55 m) cargo ship, owned by Caribbean Shipping Inc., and the ship was returned to sea six months later, using a large crane.

On September 7, the Hurricane Katrina Update for libraries affected by the storm indicated that the Bayou La Batre Public Library (then known as Mose Hudson Tapia Public Library) had been destroyed.

Students from the Alba Middle School documented the destruction through a series of photos that were exhibited at various venues in Alabama and the Chicago, Illinois, region. Some of these were published in a book titled Eyes of the Storm: A Community Survives after Katrina (ISBN 978-0-9789362-0-4).

Immediately following the hurricane a group of high school students from Sierra High School in Truckee, California, adopted the city of Bayou La Batre. They sent roughly $15,000, supplies, and 15 students to help rebuild homes. Students gathered donations, sold raffle tickets, and filled their school's gym with supplies from bedding and clothes to basic household items. The school also set up a pen pal program with the students of the nearby school in Bayou La Batre.

In October 2005, seven weeks after Hurricane Katrina, Bayou La Batre was adopted by the city of Santa Monica, California (see: "Santa Monica Pier") to assist in clean-up activities. The Santa Monica City Council approved loaning Bayou La Batre 18 vehicles, including six pickups, two trucks with large cranes, utility vehicles with smaller cranes, a dump truck, street sweepers, a riding lawnmower, and six chainsaws. The equipment was used to help remove debris and fishing boats from downtown.

== Shipbuilding ==
Bayou La Batre is a center for shipbuilding. The shipyards are owned and operated mainly by local families such as Gazzier Marine Services, Metal Shark (formerly Horizon Shipbuilding), Steiner Ship Yard, Rodriguez Boat Builders, Master Boat Builders, Williams Fabrication, and Landry Boat Works.

People from all over the world including the United States, South America, and Africa have boats built in Bayou La Batre frequently. In 2005, Steiner Ship Yard was asked by Walt Disney Studios to build a pirate ship, the Black Pearl; the pitch-black ship was actually a huge wooden prop built on top of a modern 96-foot-long steel utility boat. Crews sailed the ship out of the bayou to the Caribbean for the filming of sequels to Disney's 2003 film "Pirates of the Caribbean: The Curse of the Black Pearl".

Another ship, the FV Cornelia Marie from the Deadliest Catch series, was built in Bayou La Batre in 1989.

== Geography ==
Bayou La Batre is located in southern Mobile County. The waterway Bayou La Batre passes through the center of the city and leads southwest 2 miles (3 km) to Portersville Bay, an arm of Mississippi Sound in the Gulf of Mexico.

The city is 27 miles (43 km) by road south-southwest of Mobile and 12 miles (19 km) east of the Mississippi border. According to the U.S. Census Bureau, the city has a total area of 7.6 square miles (19.7 km^{2}), of which 7.5 square miles (19.4 km^{2}) are land and 0.1 square miles (0.3 km^{2}), or 1.87%, are water.

=== Climate ===
The climate in this area is characterized by hot, humid summers and generally mild to cool winters. According to the Köppen Climate Classification system, Bayou La Batre has a humid subtropical climate, abbreviated "Cfa" on climate maps.

Climate data for Bayou La Batre, Alabama
Month	Jan	Feb	Mar	Apr	May	Jun	Jul	Aug	Sep	Oct	Nov	Dec	Year
Mean daily maximum °C (°F)	16 (61)	17 (63)	21 (70)	25 (77)	28 (83)	31 (88)	32 (90)	32 (89)	31 (87)	26 (79)	22 (71)	17 (63)	25 (77)
Mean daily minimum °C (°F)	4 (39)	6 (42)	9 (48)	13 (56)	17 (63)	21 (69)	22 (72)	22 (72)	20 (68)	14 (57)	8 (47)	6 (42)	13 (56)
Average precipitation mm (inches)	140 (5.5)	140 (5.4)	150 (5.8)	120 (4.7)	120 (4.6)	140 (5.4)	190 (7.4)	180 (7)	160 (6.2)	97 (3.8)	100 (4.1)	120 (4.7)	1,640 (64.7)
Source: Weatherbase

== Demographics ==
Historical population
Census	Pop.	Note	%±
1950	2,196		—
1960	2,572		17.1%
1970	2,664		3.6%
1980	2,005		−24.7%
1990	2,456		22.5%
2000	2,313		−5.8%
2010	2,558		10.6%
2020	2,204		−13.8%
U.S. Decennial Census; 2013 Estimate

=== Racial and ethnic composition ===
Bayou La Batre city, Alabama – Racial and ethnic composition Note: the US Census treats Hispanic/Latino as an ethnic category. This table excludes Latinos from the racial categories and assigns them to a separate category. Hispanics/Latinos may be of any race. Race and ethnicity were not reported in Alabama for populations under 2,500 in 1980 and under 1,000 in 1990.
Race / Ethnicity (NH = Non-Hispanic)	Pop 1990	Pop 2000	Pop 2010	Pop 2020	% 1990	% 2000	% 2010	% 2020
White alone (NH)	1,554	1,196	1,524	1,306	63.27%	51.71%	59.58%	59.26%
Black or African American alone (NH)	249	234	312	273	10.14%	10.12%	12.20%	12.39%
Native American or Alaska Native alone (NH)	3	6	4	4	0.12%	0.26%	0.16%	0.18%
Asian alone (NH)	583	769	582	420	23.74%	33.25%	22.75%	19.06%
Native Hawaiian or Pacific Islander alone (NH)	x	9	1	1	x	0.39%	0.04%	0.05%
Other race alone (NH)	0	7	0	9	0.00%	0.30%	0.00%	0.41%
Mixed race or Multiracial (NH)	x	48	63	92	x	2.08%	2.46%	4.17%
Hispanic or Latino (any race)	67	44	72	99	2.73%	1.90%	2.81%	4.49%
Total	2,456	2,313	2,558	2,204	100.00%	100.00%	100.00%	100.00%

=== 2020 census ===
As of the 2020 census, Bayou La Batre had a population of 2,204. The median age was 36.4 years. 25.5% of residents were under the age of 18 and 15.5% of residents were 65 years of age or older. For every 100 females there were 95.0 males, and for every 100 females age 18 and over there were 90.8 males age 18 and over.

0.0% of residents lived in urban areas, while 100.0% lived in rural areas.

There were 815 households and 638 families in Bayou La Batre, of which 35.2% had children under the age of 18 living in them. Of all households, 36.3% were married-couple households, 20.6% were households with a male householder and no spouse or partner present, and 35.0% were households with a female householder and no spouse or partner present. About 26.7% of all households were made up of individuals and 10.5% had someone living alone who was 65 years of age or older.

There were 903 housing units, of which 9.7% were vacant. The homeowner vacancy rate was 1.3% and the rental vacancy rate was 4.5%.

=== 2010 census ===
As of the 2010 Census, Bayou La Batre had a population of 2,558. The racial and ethnic composition of the population was 60.3% white, 12.3% black or African American, 0.4% Native American, 22.8% Asian, 0.1% Pacific Islander, 1.0% from some other race, 3.2% from two or more races and 2.8% Hispanic or Latino of any race.

=== 2000 census ===
As of the census of 2000, there were 2,313 people, 769 households, and 599 families residing in the city. The population density was 573.9 people per square mile (221.6 people/km^{2}). There were 845 housing units at an average density of 209.7 units per square mile (81.0 units/km^{2}). The racial makeup of the city was 52.44% White, 10.25% Black or African American, 0.26% Native American, 33.29% Asian, 0.43% Pacific Islander, 0.95% from other races, and 2.38% from two or more races. 1.90% of the population were Hispanic or Latino of any race. The large Asian population is attributable to a large influx of Vietnamese American shrimpers as immigrants following the Vietnam War as well as Cambodian and Laotian refugees and their children. Bayou la Batre was a popular destination for such immigrants because it fostered and continues to foster a similar shrimping industry to that of Vietnam.

There were 769 households, out of which 37.7% had children under the age of 18 living with them, 52.8% were married couples living together, 17.6% had a female householder with no husband present, and 22.0% were non-families. 17.9% of all households were made up of individuals, and 9.4% had someone living alone who was 65 years of age or older. The average household size was 3.01, and the average family size was 3.40.

The age distribution was 29.9% under the age of 18, 11.1% from 18 to 24, 26.8% from 25 to 44, 21.0% from 45 to 64, and 11.2% who were 65 years of age or older. The median age was 31 years. For every 100 females, there were 100.4 males. For every 100 females age 18 and over, there were 98.5 males.

The median income for a household in the city was $24,539, and the median income for a family was $27,580. Males had a median income of $22,847 versus $14,042 for females. The per capita income for the city was $9,928. About 22.9% of families and 28.2% of the population were below the poverty line, including 35.9% of those under age 18 and 17.7% of those age 65 or over.

== Education ==
Bayou La Batre is served by the Mobile County Public School System. The city includes Booth (formerly Alba) Elementary School, Alba Middle School, and Alma Bryant High School, where all the high school students attend. Additionally, a small number of city residents' children attend Dixon Elementary in Irvington.

Both Alma Bryant and Booth Elementary are located on the northernmost edge of the city. Bryant, built in 1998, slightly delayed by Hurricane Georges, and Booth, built in 2006, delayed by Hurricane Katrina, are located on Hurricane Boulevard. Both schools' students were (in part) located in what is now Alba Middle School further south in Bayou La Batre. Alba High School first combined with Grand Bay High School in 1998 in the newly built, centrally located Alma Bryant High School, located on 16th Section land (land dedicated for school purposes). Alba Middle (which was in great part located in portable classrooms and was a part of the high School campus, as was Grand Bay Middle) took over the high school building, greatly relieving overcrowding. Similarly, the Alba Elementary Campus which shared land with the middle school, while being mostly autonomous, also became part of Alba Middle School. Alba and Grand Bay Middle are the focal point of bus routes for all school buses for Bryant High, those buses shared in grades 6-12 as a cost-saving effort to avoid overlapping routes for the separate schools.

In December 2007, a new library was opened to serve the area's Asian-American community. The library is located on Wintzell Avenue in the Bayou La Batre office of Boat People SOS, a national group that assists Vietnamese-Americans. The Mobile County Commission gave $2,500. The library will be used as a place where elderly immigrants can master computer skills, children can practice their Vietnamese after school, and day laborers can surf the Web after work.

== Film and book references ==
Bayou La Batre is mentioned in the 1994 film Forrest Gump and in Winston Groom's book of the same name on which the movie is based as the home of Forrest's army buddy Benjamin Buford "Bubba" Blue, and later as the home of Forrest Gump himself during his time as a shrimp boat captain. Shrimping scenes in the film were filmed in the Lowcountry region of South Carolina, primarily in the communities of Beaufort and Port Royal.

In April 2005, Disney Studios launched a secretly built pirate ship, the Black Pearl, out of Bayou La Batre for filming sequels to Pirates of the Caribbean: The Curse of the Black Pearl. Bayou La Batre's seafood industry also serves as a centerpiece for the History channel's reality documentary series Big Shrimpin'.

== Notable people ==
- Regina Benjamin, former United States Surgeon General
- Antwan Odom, American football player, NFL, Cincinnati Bengals
