= List of Alabama High School Athletic Association championships =

The Alabama High School Athletic Association (AHSAA) is the governing body of athletic programs for junior and senior high schools in the U.S. state of Alabama. It conducts state championship competitions in all AHSAA-sanctioned sports. Mountain Brook holds the most team championships with 203 state titles, followed by St. Paul’s Episcopal with 190; UMS-Wright with 166; and Hoover with 147. Mountain Brook boys tennis (29) and girls tennis (34) lead the all-time state title count as individual sports. Bayside Academy volleyball holds the consecutive record for girls sports with 21 titles (2002–22). Grissom boys swimming and diving holds the consecutive record for boys sports with 13 titles (1984–96).

== Baseball ==
Since the tournament’s establishment in 1948, seventy tournaments have been held with a total of 133 champions.

Year	7A	6A	5A	4A	3A	2A	1A
1962; 1969	No Playoff						
1970	--			Emma Sansom (2/3)		Dallas County (1/1)	
1971	--			Lee-Huntsville (1/1)		Autaugaville (1/1)	
1972	--			W. A. Berry (1/4)		Thomasville (1/4)	
1973	--			Emma Sansom (3/3)	Chilton County (1/1)	Flomaton (1/2)	
1974	--			Bradshaw (1/1)	Monroe County (1/1)	Baker (1/5)	
1975	--			Robert E. Lee (1/1)	Sheffield (1/1)	Hokes Bluff (1/9)	
1976	--			Hueytown (1/1)	Baker (2/5)	Hokes Bluff (2/9)	Gaston (1/1)
1977	--			Huffman (1/2)	Childersburg (1/3)	Hokes Bluff (3/9)	Mars Hill Bible (1/5)
1978	--			Dothan (1/1)	University Military School (1/10)	St. Paul's Episcopal (1/6)	Mars Hill Bible (2/5)
1979	--			Davidson (1/2)	Tarrant (1/1)	St. Paul’s Episcopal (2/6)	Sweet Water (1/10)
1980	--			Davidson (2/2)	Cherokee County (1/2)	West Blocton (1/1)	Sweet Water (2/10)
1981	--			W. A. Berry (2/4)	Cherokee County (2/2)	Cottonwood (1/4)	Montgomery Academy (1/1)
1982	--			Huffman (2/2)	Wetumpka (1/1)	Holtville (1/3)	Sweet Water (3/10)
1983	--			Fairhope (1/2)	Litchfield (1/1)	Holtville (2/3)	Sweet Water (4/10)
1984	--			Fairhope (2/2)	Hillcrest Tuscaloosa (1/4)	Vincent (1/3)	Oakman (1/1)
1985	--	Butler (1/1)	Etowah (1/4)	Wilson (1/1)	Vincent (2/3)	Cottonwood (2/4)	Trinity Presbyterian (1/7)
1986	--	Auburn (1/5)	Demopolis (1/2)	Tallassee (1/7)	Headland (1/1)	Cottonwood (3/4)	Sweet Water (5/10)
1987	--	Jeff Davis (1/2)	Etowah (2/4)	Tallassee (2/7)	West Limestone (1/1)	Cottonwood (4/4)	Fayetteville (1/1)
1988	--	Satsuma (1/1)	Midfield (1/1)	Thomasville (2/4)	UMS Prep (2/10)	Flomaton (2/2)	Sweet Water (6/10)
1989	--	Grissom (1/1)	Escambia County (1/1)	Tallassee (3/7)	Thomasville (3/4)	Sweet Water (7/10)	G.W. Long (1/17)
1990	--	Baker (3/5)	Hartselle (1/11)	Tallassee (4/7)	Rogers (1/2)	Sweet Water (8/10)	Waterloo (1/1)
1991	--	Vestavia Hills (1/10)	Hartselle (2/11)	Tallassee (5/7)	Rogers (2/2)	St. James (1/2)	G.W. Long (2/17)
1992	--	Vestavia Hills (2/10)	Hartselle (3/11)	Daphne (1/4)	New Hope (1/1)	Springville (1/2)	G.W. Long (3/17)
1993	--	Jeff Davis (2/2)	Daphne (2/4)	Pleasant Grove (1/3)	UMS-Wright (3/10)	Geneva County (1/2)	Houston Academy (1/3)
1994	--	Vestavia Hills (3/10)	Hartselle (4/11)	Pleasant Grove (2/3)	St. Paul's Episcopal (3/6)	Hale County (1/1)	G.W. Long (4/17)
1995	--	Vestavia Hills (4/10)	McAdory (1/1)	Tallassee (6/7)	UMS-Wright (4/10)	Alabama Christian (1/2)	G.W. Long (5/17)
1996	--	Vestavia Hills (5/10)	Etowah (3/4)	Pleasant Grove (3/3)	Central Florence (1/3)	Trinity Presbyterian (2/7)	Maplesville (1/2)
1997	--	Vestavia Hills (6/10)	Sylacauga (1/2)	Grand Bay (1/1)	UMS-Wright (5/10)	G. W. Long (6/17)	Maplesville (2/2)
1998	--	Vestavia Hills (7/10)	Sylacauga (2/2)	Tallassee (7/7)	Central Florence (2/3)	G. W. Long (7/17)	Shades Mountain Christian (1/1)
1999	--	Vestavia Hills (8/10)	Hartselle (5/11)	St. Paul’s Episcopal (4/6)	UMS-Wright (6/10)	Geneva County (2/2)	G. W. Long (8/17)
2000	--	Vestavia Hills (9/10)	Hartselle (6/11)	St. Paul’s Episcopal (5/6)	Trinity Presbyterian (3/7)	Alabama Christian (2/2)	G. W. Long (9/17)
2001	--	Daphne (3/4)	Southside-Gadsden (1/1)	Bibb County (1/1)	Northside (1/1)	Leroy (1/3)	G. W. Long (10/17)
2002	--	Daphne (4/4)	Cullman (1/5)	Childersburg (2/3)	Dadeville (1/1)	Gordo (1/4)	G. W. Long (11/17)
2003	--	Clay-Chalkville (1/1)	St. Paul’s Episcopal (6/6)	Hokes Bluff (4/9)	Ashville (1/1)	Gordo (2/4)	Holy Spirit (1/1)
2004	--	Pelham (1/2)	Charles Henderson (1/3)	Hokes Bluff (5/9)	Central-Florence (3/3)	Sumiton Christian (1/2)	American Christian (1/6)
2005	--	Baker (4/5)	Russell County (1/1)	Demopolis (2/2)	Hokes Bluff (6/9)	G. W. Long (12/17)	American Christian (2/6)
2006	--	Baker (5/5)	Stanhope-Elmore (1/1)	St. James (2/2)	Hokes Bluff (7/9)	Ranburne (1/1)	American Christian (3/6)
2007	--	Hillcrest-Tuscaloosa (2/4)	Cullman (2/5)	Childersburg (3/3)	Hokes Bluff (8/9)	Leroy (2/3)	Hackleburg (1/2)
2008	--	Hoover (3/4)	Cullman (3/5)	Jackson (1/1)	Hokes Bluff (9/9)	Leroy (3/3)	Athens Bible (1/1)
2009	--	Auburn (2/5)	Hartselle (7/11)	Haleyville (1/1)	Madison Academy (1/4)	American Christian (4/6)	Brantley (1/1)
2010	--	Auburn (3/5)	Spanish Fort (1/4)	UMS-Wright (7/10)	Luverne (1/1)	Mars Hill Bible (3/5)	Shoals Christian (1/4)
2011	--	Huntsville (1/1)	Spanish Fort (2/4)	UMS-Wright (8/10)	Gordo (3/4)	American Christian (5/6)	Shoals Christian (2/4)
2012	--	Oxford (1/2)	Spanish Fort (3/4)	Guntersville (1/1)	Trinity Presbyterian (4/7)	Mars Hill Bible (4/5)	Shoals Christian (3/4)
2013	--	Pelham (2/2)	Hartselle (8/11)	Charles Henderson (2/3)	Trinity Presbyterian (5/7)	G.W. Long (13/17)	St. Luke's (1/2)
2014	--	Spain Park (1/1)	Spanish Fort (4/4)	Charles Henderson (3/3)	Madison Academy (2/4)	Houston Academy (2/3)	St. Luke's (2/2)
2015	Smiths Station (1/1)	Cullman (4/5)	Russellville (1/5)	Trinity Presbyterian (6/7)	Madison Academy (3/4)	Mobile Christian (1/5)	Shoals Christian (4/4)
2016	Hewitt Trussville (1/2)	Hillcrest-Tuscaloosa (3/4)	Russellville (2/5)	UMS-Wright (9/10)	Madison Academy (4/4)	Mobile Christian (2/5)	Decatur Heritage (1/1)
2017	Hoover (4/4)	Helena (1/1)	Russellville (3/5)	UMS-Wright (10/10)	Gordo (4/4)	G.W. Long (14/17)	Sweet Water (9/10)
2018	Auburn (4/5)	Hazel Green (1/1)	Faith Academy (1/3)	Andalusia (1/1)	Mobile Christian (3/5)	G.W. Long (15/17)	Sweet Water (10/10)
2019	McGill-Toolen (1/1)	Cullman (5/5)	Springville (2/2)	Brooks (1/1)	Providence Christian (1/1)	G.W. Long (16/17)	Mars Hill Bible (5/5)
2020	No competition due to COVID-19 pandemic						
2021	Auburn (5/5)	Faith Academy (2/3)	Russellville (4/5)	Mobile Christian (4/5)	Phil Campbell (1/1)	Westbrook Christian (1/2)	Bayshore Christian (1/2)
2022	Central-Phenix City (1/1)	Hartselle (9/11)	Russellville (5/5)	Mobile Christian (5/5)	Trinity Presbyterian (7/7)	G.W. Long (17/17)	Bayshore Christian (2/2)
2023	Vestavia Hills (10/10)	Oxford (2/2)	Holtville (3/3)	Etowah (4/4)	Houston Academy (3/3)	Ariton (1/3)	Appalachian (1/1)
2024	Bob Jones (1/1)	Hillcrest-Tuscaloosa (4/4)	Alexandria (1/1)	Corner (1/1)	Thomasville (4/4)	Ariton (2/3)	Sumiton Christian (2/2)
2025	Tuscaloosa County (1/1)	Hartselle (10/11)	American Christian (6/6)	Deshler (1/1)	Glenwood (1/2)	Vincent (3/3)	Hackleburg (2/2)
2026	Hewitt Trussville (2/2)	Hartselle (11/11)	Faith Academy (3/3)	Westbrook Christian (2/2)	Glenwood (2/2)	Ariton (3/3)	Hubbertville (1/1)

G. W. Long holds the all-time record with 17 titles.

The Vestavia Hills Rebels hold the most consecutive championships with 7 titles (1994-00).

Year	Champion
1948	Ramsay (1/1)
1949	Woodlawn (1/3)
1950	Sidney Lanier (1/6)
1951	Sidney Lanier (2/6)
1952	Sidney Lanier (3/6)
1953	Sidney Lanier (4/6)
1954	Sidney Lanier (5/6)
1955	Sidney Lanier (6/6)
1956	Woodlawn (2/3)
1957	Emma Sansom (1/3)
1958	Anniston (1/1)
1959	Woodlawn (3/3)
1960	Vigor (1/1)
1961	Coffee (1/1)

== Basketball ==
=== Boys ===
Since the tournament’s establishment in 1921, 105 tournaments have been held with a total of 182 champions.

==== 1964–present ====
Year	7A	6A	5A	4A	3A	2A	1A
1964	--			Tuscaloosa (4/4)	Pisgah (2/3)	Hatton (1/1)	New Brockton (1/3)
1965	--			Sidney Lanier (4/6)	Fayette (2/2)	Priceville (4/4)	DAR (1/1)
1966	--			Butler (1/6)	Pisgah (3/3)	Kinston (1/3)	Pleasant Home (1/3)
1967	--			Sidney Lanier (5/6)	Scottsboro (4/4)	Hazel Green (1/1)	Clements (1/1)
1968	--			Lee-Huntsville (1/4)	B. B. Comer (1/1)	Kinston (2/3)	New Brockton (2/3)
1969	--			Parker (1/4)	Austin (1/3)	Section (1/4)	R. R. Moton (Tallassee) (1/1)
1970	--			Decatur (1/1)	Bibb County (1/2)	East Highland (1/1)	Bibb Graves (1/2)
1971	--			Parker (2/4)	Morgan County (1/2)	Abbeville (1/2)	Wilcox County Training (1/1)
1972	--			West End (1/3)	Colbert County (1/3)	J. F. Shields (1/5)	Bibb Graves (2/2)
1973	--			Austin (2/3)	Glenn (1/2)	St. Jude (1/8)	Holy Family (1/6)
1974	--			Hayes (1/4)	Glenn (2/2)	Montevallo (1/2)	East Perry (1/1)
1975	--			Parker (3/4)	Guntersville (1/1)	Montevallo (2/2)	Collinsville (1/1)
1976	--			Bradshaw (1/1)	Thompson (1/2)	Colbert Heights (1/1)	Athens Bible (1/1)
1977	--			Selma (3/4)	Thompson (2/2)	St. Jude (2/8)	Holy Family (2/6)
1978	--			Carver-Birmingham (1/2)	Eufaula (2/4)	R. C. Hatch (1/11)	Westside (1/1)
1979	--			Carver-Birmingham (2/2)	Wetumpka (1/2)	East Limestone (1/2)	Rebecca Comer (1/1)
1980	--			Coffee (2/2)	Wetumpka (2/2)	Talladega County (1/2)	Alabama Lutheran (1/1)
1981	--			Hayes (2/4)	Colbert County (2/3)	New Brockton (3/3)	Kinston (3/3)
1982	--			Hayes (3/4)	Russellville (1/1)	Autaugaville (1/4)	Holy Family (3/6)
1983	--			Carver-Montgomery (1/5)	Gadsden (1/1)	Russell County (1/1)	Loachapoka (1/5)
1984	--			Carver-Montgomery (2/5)	Midfield (1/5)	Headland (1/1)	Talladega County Training School (2/2)
1985	--	Tuskegee (1/2)	Southside-Selma (1/1)	Wilcox County (1/3)	R. C. Hatch (2/11)	St. Jude (3/8)	Calhoun (1/4)
1986	--	LeFlore (1/4)	Eufaula (3/4)	LaFayette (1/4)	Tanner (1/3)	Hazlewood (1/1)	Holy Family (4/6)
1987	--	J. O. Johnson (1/3)	Hayes (4/4)	Livingston (1/2)	R. C. Hatch (3/11)	Holy Family (5/6)	Notasulga (1/2)
1988	--	Grissom (1/2)	Sylacauga (1/2)	Sumter County (1/6)	Clayton (1/1)	Francis Marion (1/6)	Loachapoka (2/5)
1989	--	LeFlore (2/4)	Bibb County (2/2)	Clarke County (1/1)	LaFayette (2/4)	Francis Marion (2/6)	Loachapoka (3/5)
1990	--	Central-Tuscaloosa (1/2)	Woodlawn (5/6)	Wenonah (1/7)	East Limestone (2/2)	Francis Marion (3/6)	Autaugaville (2/4)
1991	--	Central-Tuscaloosa (2/2)	Tuskegee (2/2)	Buckhorn (2/5)	Francis Marion (4/6)	Clay County (1/2)	Houston Academy (1/1)
1992	--	Vestavia Hills (1/2)	Emma Sansom (1/1)	Alexandria (1/3)	South Lamar (1/1)	Clay County (2/2)	Notasulga (2/2)
1993	--	Austin (3/3)	Wenonah (2/7)	Alexandria (2/3)	Francis Marion (5/6)	Warrior (1/1)	Brantley (1/4)
1994	--	Selma (4/4)	Hartselle (2/2)	Sumter County (2/6)	R.C. Hatch (4/11)	J.F. Shields (2/5)	Brantley (2/4)
1995	--	Jeff Davis (1/2)	Buckhorn (3/5)	Central-Coosa (1/5)	R.C. Hatch (5/11)	Brantley (3/4)	Autaugaville (3/4)
1996	--	West End (2/3)	Andalusia (1/1)	Abbeville (2/2)	Holtville (1/1)	Lineville (1/1)	Calera (1/3)
1997	--	West End (3/3)	B. C. Rain (1/1)	Alexandria (3/3)	Colbert County (3/3)	Calera (2/3)	Loachapoka (4/5)
1998	--	Minor (1/1)	John Carroll (1/3)	Sumter County (3/6)	UMS-Wright (1/1)	Keith (1/1)	St. Jude (4/8)
1999	--	Grissom (2/2)	Eufaula (4/4)	Sumter County (4/6)	Trinity (1/1)	Catholic-Montgomery (1/2)	Madison Academy (1/7)
2000	--	Woodlawn (6/6)	Wilcox Central (2/3)	Central-Coosa (2/5)	Francis Marion (6/6)	Catholic-Montgomery (2/2)	Courtland (1/1)
2001	--	Sidney Lanier (6/6)	Blount (1/1)	Central-Coosa (3/5)	Calhoun (2/4)	Barbour County (1/3)	Pleasant Home (2/3)
2002	--	LeFlore (3/4)	Anniston (1/3)	Central-Hayneville (1/1)	LaFayette (3/4)	Holy Family (6/6)	Pleasant Home (3/3)
2003	--	John Carroll (2/3)	Wilcox Central (3/3)	Livingston (2/2)	Calhoun (3/4)	R. C. Hatch (6/11)	Section (2/4)
2004	--	John Carroll (3/3)	Butler (2/6)	Central-Coosa (4/5)	Sumter County (5/6)	R. C. Hatch (7/11)	J. F. Shields (3/5)
2005	--	Auburn (1/1)	Butler (3/6)	Greene County (1/2)	Sumter County (6/6)	Calera (3/3)	J. F. Shields (4/5)
2006	--	Jeff Davis (2/2)	Ramsay (1/2)	Hillcrest-Evergreen (1/2)	Madison Academy (2/7)	R. C. Hatch (8/11)	St. Jude (5/8)
2007	--	LeFlore (4/4)	Williamson (1/2)	Madison County (1/2)	Madison Academy (3/7)	R.C. Hatch (9/11)	J. F. Shields (5/5)
2008	--	Hillcrest-Tuscaloosa (1/2)	Butler (4/6)	Bullock County (1/1)	Madison Academy (4/7)	R.C. Hatch (10/11)	St. Jude (6/8)
2009	--	Vestavia Hills (2/2)	Butler (5/6)	Anniston (2/3)	Leeds (1/1)	Barbour County (2/3)	Loachapoka (5/5)
2010	--	Bob Jones (1/1)	Lee-Huntsville (2/4)	Ramsay (2/2)	Greene County (2/2)	Pickens County (1/4)	Edward Bell (1/1)
2011	--	Hillcrest-Tuscaloosa (2/2)	Wenonah (3/7)	Butler (6/6)	Greensboro (1/2)	Tanner (2/3)	Pickens County (2/4)
2012	--	Carver-Montgomery (3/5)	Wenonah (4/7)	Midfield (2/5)	Greensboro (2/2)	Barbour County (3/3)	Pickens County (3/4)
2013	--	Mountain Brook (1/6)	Wenonah (5/7)	Madison County (2/2)	Madison Academy (5/7)	Tanner (3/3)	St. Jude (7/8)
2014	--	Mountain Brook (2/6)	Parker (4/4)	Dallas County (1/1)	Midfield (3/5)	Elba (1/1)	St. Jude (8/8)
2015	Hoover (1/4)	Carver-Montgomery (4/5)	J.O. Johnson (2/3)	West Limestone (2/2)	Madison Academy (6/7)	Lafayette (4/4)	Sacred Heart (1/4)
2016	McGill-Toolen (1/1)	Homewood (1/1)	J.O. Johnson (3/3)	Westminster Christian (1/1)	Madison Academy (7/7)	Lanett (1/3)	Sacred Heart (2/4)
2017	Mountain Brook (3/6)	Paul Bryant (1/2)	Mae Jemison (1/1)	Hale County (1/1)	Midfield (4/5)	Lanett (2/3)	Sacred Heart (3/4)
2018	Mountain Brook (4/6)	Carver-Montgomery (5/5)	Sylacauga (2/2)	Cordova (1/1)	Plainview (1/4)	Lanett (3/3)	Sacred Heart (4/4)
2019	Mountain Brook (5/6)	Pinson Valley (1/1)	Wenonah (6/7)	Talladega (1/1)	Plainview (2/4)	Central-Coosa (5/5)	Decatur Heritage (1/1)
2020	Lee-Montgomery (1/1)	Huffman (1/1)	Fairfield (1/3)	Williamson (2/2)	Pike County (1/1)	Calhoun (4/4)	Pickens County (4/4)
2021	Oak Mountain (1/1)	Mountain Brook (6/6)	Lee-Huntsville (3/4)	Anniston (3/3)	Fyffe (1/1)	Midfield (5/5)	Autaugaville (4/4)
2022	Enterprise (1/1)	Cullman (1/1)	Lee-Huntsville (4/4)	Jacksonville (1/2)	Plainview (3/4)	Section (3/4)	Covenant Christian (1/2)
2023	Hoover (2/4)	Buckhorn (4/5)	Valley (1/1)	Jacksonville (2/2)	Plainview (4/4)	Aliceville (1/1)	Covenant Christian (2/2)
2024	Hoover (3/4)	Buckhorn (5/5)	Fairfield (2/3)	Jackson (1/2)	Hillcrest-Evergreen (2/2)	Mars Hill Bible (1/1)	Georgiana (1/1)
2025	Hoover (4/4)	Paul Bryant (2/2)	Vigor (1/1)	Jackson (2/2)	Montgomery Academy (1/2)	Providence Christian (1/1)	R.C. Hatch (11/11)
2026	Tuscaloosa County (2/2)	Oxford (1/1)	Wenonah (7/7)	Fairfield (3/3)	Montgomery Academy (2/2)	Section (4/4)	Brantley (4/4)

R.C. Hatch holds the all-time record with 11 titles.

Two schools share the record for most consecutive championships (4): Francis Marion (1988–91) & Sacred Heart Catholic (2015–18).

==== 1921–1964 ====
Year	AA	A
1921	Central (Birmingham) (1/1)	
1922	Chambers County (Milltown) (1/1)	
1923	Simpson (Birmingham) (1/3)	
1924	Simpson (Birmingham) (2/3)	
1925	Simpson (Birmingham) (3/3)	
1926	Snead Seminary (1/2)	
1927	Woodlawn (1/6)	
1928	Mortimer Jordan (1/1)	
1929	Snead Seminary (2/2)	
1930	Huntsville (1/1)	
1931	Geraldine (1/3)	
1932	Geraldine (2/3)	
1933	Geraldine (3/3)	
1934	Jackson County (Scottsboro) (1/4)	
1935	Tuscaloosa (1/4)	
1936	Sardis (1/1)	
1937	Woodlawn (2/6)	
1938	Jackson County (Scottsboro) (2/4)	
1939	Chilton County (1/3)	
1940	Marion County (1/1)	
1941	Chilton County (2/3)	
1942	Chilton County (3/3)	
1943	Woodlawn (3/6)	
1944	Jackson County (Scottsboro) (3/4)	
1945	A. G. Parrish (Selma) (1/4)	
1946	A. G. Parrish (Selma) (2/4)	
1947	Phil Campbell (1/1)	
1948	Etowah (1/1)	Hubbertville (1/1)
1949	Sidney Lanier (1/6)	Corner (1/2)
1950	Ensley (1/1)	Union Hill (1/1)
1951	Coffee (1/2)	Priceville (1/4)
1952	Winfield (1/1)	T. R. Miller (1/1)
1953	Eufaula (1/4)	Austinville (1/4)
1954	Dothan (1/1)	Corner (2/2)
1955	Tuscaloosa (2/4)	Priceville (2/4)
1956	Murphy (1/1)	West Limestone (1/2)
1957	Woodlawn (4/6)	Austinville (2/4)
1958	Fayette (1/2)	Austinville (3/4)
1959	Pisgah (1/3)	Austinville (4/4)
1960	Tuscaloosa County (1/2)	Buckhorn (1/5)
1961	Tuscaloosa (3/4)	Priceville (3/4)
1962	Sidney Lanier (2/6)	Danville (1/2)
1963	Sidney Lanier (3/6)	Danville (2/2)

=== Girls ===
Since the tournament’s establishment in 1978, forty-eight tournaments have been held with a total of 115 champions.

Year	7A	6A	5A	4A	3A	2A	1A
1978	--			Jefferson Davis (1/4)	Sumter County (1/2)	Winfield (1/3)	J.T. Wright (1/1)
1979	--			J.O. Johnson (1/3)	Winfield (2/3)	Red Bay (1/6)	Mars Hill Bible (1/1)
1980	--			McGill-Toolen (1/3)	Eufaula (1/5)	Red Bay (2/6)	Hubbertville (1/2)
1981	--			McGill-Toolen (2/3)	Valley (1/1)	Pisgah (1/11)	Vina (1/2)
1982	--			Central-Tuscaloosa (1/4)	Haleyville (1/1)	Pisgah (2/11)	Vina (2/2)
1983	--			J.O. Johnson (2/3)	Keith (1/3)	Tanner (1/3)	Akron (1/1)
1984	--			Central-Tuscaloosa (2/4)	Hartselle (1/2)	Winfield (3/3)	Courtland (1/4)
1985	--	Johnson (3/3)	Hartselle (2/2)	Deshler (1/8)	Ider (1/2)	Courtland (2/4)	Phillips (1/3)
1986	--	Williamson (1/2)	Wenonah (1/8)	New Hope (1/1)	Tanner (2/3)	Fyffe (1/7)	Phillips (2/3)
1987	--	Vestavia Hills (1/1)	Monroe County (1/1)	Livingston (1/1)	Lauderdale County (1/14)	Red Bay (3/6)	Spring Garden (1/10)
1988	--	McGill-Toolen (3/3)	Pell City (1/2)	Buckhorn (1/3)	Sulligent (1/2)	Gaston (1/1)	Mars Hill Bible (2/8)
1989	--	Vigor (1/1)	Williamson (2/2)	Wilson (1/1)	DAR (1/1)	Mars Hill Bible (3/8)	Hubbertville (2/2)
1990	--	Decatur (1/5)	Hamilton (1/1)	Wenonah (2/8)	Keith (2/3)	Mars Hill Bible (4/8)	Waterloo (1/1)
1991	--	Decatur (2/5)	Pell City (2/2)	Clarke County (1/1)	Lauderdale County (2/14)	Ranburne (1/1)	Mars Hill Bible (5/8)
1992	--	Decatur (3/5)	Sylacauga (1/2)	Cherokee County (1/3)	Lauderdale County (3/14)	Fyffe (2/7)	New Site (1/1)
1993	--	Carver-Montgomery (1/1)	Wenonah (3/8)	Cherokee County (2/3)	Red Bay (4/6)	Lauderdale County (4/14)	Carrollton (1/3)
1994	--	LeFlore (1/3)	Eufaula (2/5)	Buckhorn (2/3)	Central-Florence (1/1)	Fyffe (3/7)	Carrollton (2/3)
1995	--	Decatur (4/5)	Hazel Green (1/9)	T. R. Miller (1/4)	St. Paul's Episcopal (1/1)	Fyffe (4/7)	Maplesville (1/1)
1996	--	Central-Tuscaloosa (3/4)	Eufaula (3/5)	T. R. Miller (2/4)	Sulligent (2/2)	Fyffe (5/7)	Mars Hill Bible (6/8)
1997	--	Butler (1/3)	Eufaula (4/5)	Lawrence County (1/3)	Pisgah (3/11)	Fyffe (6/7)	Carrollton (3/3)
1998	--	Butler (2/3)	Sylacauga (2/2)	Cherokee County (3/3)	Lauderdale County (5/14)	Hazlewood (1/2)	Loachapoka (1/1)
1999	--	Butler (3/3)	Athens (1/3)	Lawrence County (2/3)	Montgomery Academy (1/1)	Cold Springs (1/4)	Sunshine (1/1)
2000	--	Decatur (5/5)	Buckhorn (3/3)	Lawrence County (3/3)	R. C. Hatch (1/1)	Fyffe (7/7)	Autaugaville (1/1)
2001	--	Hoover (1/12)	Boaz (1/1)	Andalusia (1/1)	Hanceville (1/1)	Red Bay (5/6)	Notasulga (1/2)
2002	--	Sparkman (1/3)	Athens (2/3)	T. R. Miller (3/4)	Lauderdale County (6/14)	Hatton (1/2)	Belgreen (1/1)
2003	--	Sparkman (2/3)	Athens (3/3)	Deshler (2/8)	Lauderdale County (7/14)	Pisgah (4/11)	Notasulga (2/2)
2004	--	Wenonah (4/8)	Ramsay (1/4)	Deshler (3/8)	Abbeville (1/1)	Hatton (2/2)	Spring Garden (2/10)
2005	--	Sidney Lanier (1/1)	Ramsay (2/4)	Deshler (4/8)	Pisgah (5/11)	Mars Hill Bible (7/8)	Spring Garden (3/10)
2006	--	Jeff Davis (2/4)	Ramsay (3/4)	Deshler (5/8)	Lauderdale County (8/14)	Samson (1/4)	McIntosh (1/3)
2007	--	Sparkman (3/3)	Ramsay (4/4)	Midfield (1/4)	Sheffield (1/1)	Samson (2/4)	McIntosh (2/3)
2008	--	Bob Jones (1/3)	Eufaula (5/5)	Midfield (2/4)	Crossville (1/1)	Cold Springs (2/4)	Spring Garden (4/10)
2009	--	Bob Jones (2/3)	LeFlore (2/3)	Midfield (3/4)	T.R. Miller (4/4)	Cold Springs (3/4)	Hazlewood (2/2)
2010	--	Hoover (2/12)	Fairfield (1/1)	Midfield (4/4)	Sumter County (2/2)	Clements (1/1)	J. F. Shields (1/1)
2011	--	Bob Jones (3/3)	Erwin (1/1)	Brewbaker Tech (1/1)	Madison Academy (1/3)	Tanner (3/3)	R. A. Hubbard (3/4)
2012	--	Hoover (3/12)	Brewer (1/1)	Jacksonville (1/1)	Lauderdale County (9/14)	Section (1/1)	McIntosh (3/3)
2013	--	Hoover (4/12)	Faith Academy (1/1)	Oneonta (1/2)	Lauderdale County (10/14)	Woodland (1/2)	Brantley (1/2)
2014	--	Shades Valley (1/1)	Wenonah (5/8)	Oneonta (2/2)	Lauderdale County (11/14)	Woodland (2/2)	Brantley (2/2)
2015	Jeff Davis (3/4)	Homewood (1/2)	Wenonah (6/8)	Deshler (6/8)	Lauderdale County (12/14)	Red Bay (6/6)	Keith (3/3)
2016	Jeff Davis (4/4)	Leflore (3/3)	Wenonah (7/8)	Deshler (7/8)	Lauderdale County (13/14)	Samson (3/4)	Spring Garden (5/10)
2017	Hoover (5/12)	Homewood (2/2)	Wenonah (8/8)	Madison Academy (2/3)	Locust Fork (1/1)	Geneva County (1/1)	R.A. Hubbard (4/4)
2018	Spain Park (1/2)	Hazel Green (2/9)	Charles Henderson (1/2)	Madison Academy (3/3)	Pisgah (6/11)	Samson (4/4)	Spring Garden (6/10)
2019	Hoover (6/12)	Hazel Green (3/9)	Central-Tuscaloosa (4/4)	Rogers (1/2)	Pisgah (7/11)	Cold Springs (4/4)	Phillips (3/3)
2020	Spain Park (2/2	Hazel Green (4/9)	Charles Henderson (2/2)	Anniston (1/1)	Pisgah (8/11)	Collinsville (1/1)	Spring Garden (7/10)
2021	Hoover (7/12)	Hazel Green (5/9)	Carver-Birmingham (1/1)	Rogers (2/2)	Prattville Cristian (1/3)	Pisgah (9/11)	Skyline (1/1)
2022	Hoover (8/12)	Hazel Green (6/9)	Guntersville (1/2)	Deshler (8/8)	Prattville Christian (2/3)	Pisgah (10/11)	Marion County (1/1)
2023	Hoover (9/12)	Hazel Green (7/9)	Pleasant Grove (1/1)	Prattville Christian (3/3)	Trinity Presbyterian (1/3)	Mars Hill Bible (8/8)	Spring Garden (8/10)
2024	Hoover (10/12)	Hazel Green (8/9)	Jasper (1/1)	Good Hope (1/2)	Trinity Presbyterian (2/3)	Ider (2/2)	Spring Garden (9/10)
2025	Hoover (11/12)	Park Crossing (1/1)	Scottsboro (1/1)	Trinity Presbyterian (3/3)	Lauderdale County (14/14)	Pisgah (11/11)	Spring Garden (10/10)
2026	Hoover (12/12)	Hazel Green (9/9)	Guntersville (2/2)	Good Hope (2/2)	St. James (1/1)	North Sand Mountain (1/1)	Winterboro (1/1)

Lauderdale County holds the all-time record with 14 titles.

The Hazel Green Trojans hold the most consecutive championships with 7 titles (2018–24).

== Bowling ==
=== Boys ===
Since the tournaments establishment in 2016, ten tournaments have been held with a total of nine champions.

Year	7A	6A	5A	4A	3A	2A	1A
2016	Spain Park (1/4)						
2017	Spain Park (2/4)						
2018	Buckhorn (1/1)						
2019	Vestavia Hills (1/2)						
2020	Thompson (1/1)						
2021	Sparkman (1/2)		East Limestone (1/1)				
2022	Spain Park (3/4)		American Christian (1/1)				
2023	Sparkman (2/2)		Etowah (1/2)				
2024	Spain Park (4/4)		John Carroll (1/1)				
2025	Vestavia Hills (2/2)		Etowah (2/2)				
2026	Stanhope-Elmore (1/1)		Scottsboro (1/1)				

Spain Park holds the all-time record with 4 titles.

Spain Park holds the most consecutive championships with two 2 titles.

=== Girls ===
Since the tournament’s establishment in 1972, sixteen tournaments have been held with a total of eleven champions.

Year	7A	6A	5A	4A	3A	2A	1A
1972	Bradshaw (1/2)						
1973	Huffman (1/2)						
1974	Bradshaw (2/2)						
1975	Hewitt-Trussville (1/2)						
1976	Huffman (2/2)						
1977	Hewitt-Trussville (2/2)						
1978-2015	Discontinued						
2016	Sparkman (1/3)						
2017	Southside-Gadsden (1/5)						
2018	Southside-Gadsden (2/5)						
2019	Southside-Gadsden (3/5)						
2020	Southside-Gadsden (4/5)						
2021	Sparkman (2/3)		Satsuma (1/1)				
2022	Sparkman (3/3)		American Christian (1/2)				
2023	American Christian (2/2)		Beauregard (1/1)				
2024	Stanhope-Elmore (1/1)		Southside-Gadsden (5/5)				
2025	Thompson (1/2)		Scottsboro (1/2)				
2026	Thompson (2/2)		Scottsboro (2/2)				

Southside-Gadsden holds the all-time record with 5 titles.

Southside-Gadsden holds the most consecutive championships with 4 titles.

== Cross Country ==
=== Boys ===
Since the tournament’s establishment in 1956, seventy-one tournaments have been held with a total of fifty-nine champions.

Year	7A	6A	5A	4A	3A	2A	1A
1965	--			Sidney Lanier (1/1)			
1966	--			Ramsay (1/1)			
1967	--			Robert E. Lee (1/1)	Auburn (1/10)		
1968	--			W. A. Berry (1/16)	Auburn (2/10)		
1969	--			Bradshaw (1/1)	Auburn (3/10)		
1970	--			W. A. Berry (2/16)	Auburn (4/10)		
1971	--			W. A. Berry (3/16) & Murphy (8/9)^{†}	University Military School (1/8)		
1972	--			Grissom (1/1)	Cullman (1/2)		
1973	--			W. A. Berry (4/16)	Cullman (2/2)		
1974	--			Mountain Brook (1/19)	Haleyville (1/5)		
1975	--			McGill-Toolen (2/4)	University Military School (2/8)	Oneonta (1/1)	
1976	--			McGill-Toolen (3/4)	Gardendale (1/5)	DAR (1/1)	
1977	--			Huntsville (1/9)	Gardendale (2/5)	Athens Bible (1/5)	
1978	--			Mountain Brook (2/19)	Gardendale (3/5)	Athens Bible (2/5)	
1979	--			Auburn (5/10)	Gardendale (4/5)	Athens Bible (3/5)	
1980	--			Auburn (6/10)	UMS Prep (3/8)	Athens Bible (4/5)	
1981	--			W. A. Berry (5/16)	Brooks (1/1)	Calhoun (1/1)	
1982	--			W. A. Berry (6/16)	Gardendale (5/5)	Randolph (1/10)	
1983	--			Huntsville (2/9)	Haleyville (2/5)	Vincent (1/1)	
1984	--	Huntsville (3/9)	Haleyville (3/5)		St. Paul's (1/10)		
1985	--	Huntsville (4/9)	Haleyville (4/5)		St. Paul's (2/10)		
1986	--	Mountain Brook (3/19)	Haleyville (5/5)		St. Paul's (3/10)		
1987	--	Vestavia Hills (1/5)	Hamilton (1/7)				
1988	--	Decatur (1/2)	Hamilton (2/7)				
1989	--	Decatur (2/2)	Hamilton (3/7)				
1990	--	McGill-Toolen (4/4)	Hamilton (4/7)	St. Paul's (4/10)			
1991	--	Scottsboro (1/20)	Hamilton (5/7)	St. Paul's (5/10)			
1992	--	W. A. Berry (7/16)	Scottsboro (2/20)	Lawrence County (1/8)			
1993	--	Mountain Brook (4/19)	Smiths Station (1/4)	Lawrence County (2/8)			
1994	--	Mountain Brook (5/19)	Scottsboro (3/20)	St. Paul's (6/10)		Shades Mountain Christian (1/6)	
1995	--	Mountain Brook (6/19)	Smiths Station (2/4)	Lawrence County (3/8)		Shades Mountain Christian (2/6)	
1996	--	Mountain Brook (7/19)	Smiths Station (3/4)	Lawrence County (4/8)		Shades Mountain Christian (3/6)	
1997	--	Hoover (8/16)	Smiths Station (4/4)	UMS-Wright (4/8)		Altamont (1/5)	
1998	--	Murphy (9/9)	Scottsboro (4/20)	Briarwood Christian (1/3)		Altamont (2/5)	
1999	--	Hoover (9/16)	Scottsboro (5/20)		Briarwood Christian (2/3)		
2000	--	Hoover (10/16)	Briarwood Christian (3/3)		Altamont (3/5)		
2001	--	Hoover (11/16)	Oak Mountain (1/1)		Altamont (4/5)		
2002	--	Hoover (12/16)	Scottsboro (6/20)		Montgomery Academy (1/4)		
2003	--	Mountain Brook (8/19)	Scottsboro (7/20)	Lawrence County (5/8)		Hatton (1/6)	
2004	--	Hoover (13/16)	Scottsboro (8/20)	Lawrence County (6/8)		Shades Mountain Christian (4/6)	
2005	--	Hoover (14/16)	St. Paul's (7/10)	Randolph (2/10)		Shades Mountain Christian (5/6)	
2006	--	Mountain Brook (9/19)	St. Paul's (8/10)	Randolph (3/10)		Shades Mountain Christian (6/6)	
2007	--	Hoover (15/16)	St. Paul's (9/10)	Randolph (4/10)		Bayside Academy (1/2)	
2008	--	Mountain Brook (10/19)	Scottsboro (9/20)	UMS-Wright (5/8)	Randolph (5/10)	Hatton (2/6)	
2009	--	Mountain Brook (11/19)	Spanish Fort (1/1)	UMS-Wright (6/8)	Randolph (6/10)	Hatton (3/6)	
2010	--	Mountain Brook (12/19)	Scottsboro (10/20)	UMS-Wright (7/8)	Randolph (7/10)	Hatton (4/6)	
2011	--	Mountain Brook (13/19)	Scottsboro (11/20)	UMS-Wright (8/8)	Randolph (8/10)	Cottage Hill Christian (1/1)	
2012	--	Vestavia Hills (2/5)	Homewood (1/8)	Randolph (9/10)	Catholic-Montgomery (1/2)	Hatton (5/6)	
2013	--	Auburn (7/10)	Homewood (2/8)	Randolph (10/10)	Westminster Christian (1/1)	Montgomery Academy (2/4)	
2014	Auburn (8/10)	Homewood (3/8)	Lawrence County (7/8)	Northside (1/1)	Montgomery Academy (3/4)	Cold Springs (1/5)	
2015	Auburn (9/10)	Homewood (4/8)	Lawrence County (8/8)	Trinity Presbyterian (1/2)	American Christian (1/5)	Cold Springs (2/5)	
2016	Auburn (10/10)	Homewood (5/8)	Scottsboro (12/20)	LAMP (1/1)	American Christian (2/5)	St. Bernard (1/2)	
2017	Mountain Brook (14/19)	Homewood (6/8)	Scottsboro (13/20)	Trinity Presbyterian (2/2)	American Christian (3/5)	Westminster-Oak Mountain (1/2)	
2018	Huntsville (5/9)	Homewood (7/8)	Scottsboro (14/20)	Catholic - Montgomery (2/2)	Pleasant Valley (1/1)	Altamont (5/5)	
2019	Huntsville (6/9)	Homewood (8/8)	Scottsboro (15/20)	Saint John Paul II Catholic (1/3)	St. Michael Catholic (1/1)	Cold Springs (3/5)	
2020	Huntsville (7/9)	Scottsboro (16/20)	Saint John Paul II Catholic (2/3)	American Christian (4/5)	St. Bernard (2/2)	Hatton (6/6)	
2021	Huntsville (8/9)	Scottsboro (17/20)	Saint John Paul II Catholic (3/3)	Bayside Academy (2/2)	Providence Christian (1/4)	Bayshore Christian (1/3)	
2022	Vestavia Hills (3/5)	Mountain Brook (15/19)	American Christian (5/5)	Providence Christian (2/4)	Bayshore Christian (2/3	Cold Springs (4/5)	
2023	Vestavia Hills (4/5)	Mountain Brook (16/19)	Scottsboro (18/20)	Providence Christian (3/4)	Bayshore Christian (3/3)	Cold Springs (5/5)	
2024	Huntsville (9/9)	Mountain Brook (17/19)	Providence Christian (4/4)	Hamilton (6/7)	J.B. Pennington (1/1)	Mars Hill Bible (1/1)	
2025	Vestavia Hills (5/5)	Mountain Brook (18/19)	Scottsboro (19/20)	Hamilton (7/7)	Montgomery Academy (4/4)	Athens Bible (5/5)	
Year	6A	5A	4A	3A	1A-2A	Double A	Single A
2026	Hoover (16/16)	Mountain Brook (19/19)	Scottsboro (20/20)	White Plains (1/1)	Sand Rock (1/1)	St. Paul's (10/10)	Westminster-Oak Mountain (2/2)

^{†} Co-Champions

Scottsboro holds the all-time record with 20 titles.

The Randolph Raiders hold the most consecutive championships with 9 titles (2005–13).

Year	AA	A
1956	Murphy (1/9)	
1957	Murphy (2/9)	
1958	Murphy (3/9)	
1959	Tuscaloosa County (1/1)	
1960	Murphy (4/9)	
1961	Murphy (5/9)	--
1962	Murphy (6/9)	--
1963	McGill Institute (1/4)	Birmingham University School (1/2)
1964	Murphy (7/9)	Birmingham University School (2/2)

=== Girls ===
Since the tournament’s establishment in 1973, fifty-four tournaments have been held with a total of forty-three champions.

Year	7A	6A	5A	4A	3A	2A	1A
1973	--			Tuscaloosa (1/1)			
1974	--			Mountain Brook (1/29)			
1975	--			Mountain Brook (2/29)			
1976	--			Grissom (1/11)		St. Paul's (1/19)	
1977	--			Mountain Brook (3/29)	Cullman (1/7)	J.T. Wright (1/6)	
1978	--			Grissom (2/11)	Cullman (2/7)	Randolph (1/7)	
1979	--			Grissom (3/11)	J.T. Wright (2/6)	Randolph (2/7)	
1980	--			Grissom (4/11)	J.T. Wright (3/6)	Randolph (3/7)	
1981	--			Vestavia Hills (1/1)	J.T. Wright (4/6)	Altamont (1/5)	
1982	--			Grissom (5/11)	J.T. Wright (5/6)	Hokes Bluff (1/1)*	
1983	--			Grissom (6/11)	J.T. Wright (6/6)	St. Paul's (2/19)	
1984	--	Grissom (7/11)	Cullman (3/7)		St. Paul's (3/19)		
1985	--	Grissom (8/11)	Cullman (4/7)		St. Paul's (4/19)		
1986	--	Grissom (9/11)	Cullman (5/7)		St. Paul's (5/19)		
1987	--	Huntsville (1/3)	St. Paul's (6/19)				
1988	--	Grissom (10/11)	St. Paul's (7/19)				
1989	--	Huntsville (2/3)	St. Paul's (8/19)				
1990	--	Mountain Brook (4/29)	Cullman (6/7)*	St. Paul's (9/19)			
1991	--	McGill-Toolen (1/2)	Fort Payne (1/2)	St. Paul's (10/19)			
1992	--	Grissom (11/11)	Scottsboro (1/25)	St. Paul's (11/19)			
1993	--	McGill-Toolen (2/2)	Cullman (7/7)	St. Paul's (12/19)			
1994	--	Mountain Brook (5/29)	Scottsboro (2/25)	St. Paul's (13/19)		Shades Mountain Christian (1/2)	
1995	--	Mountain Brook (6/29)	Scottsboro (3/25)	St. Paul's (14/19)		Shades Mountain Christian (2/2)	
1996	--	Mountain Brook (7/29)	Scottsboro (4/25)	St. Paul's (15/19)		Randolph (4/7)	
1997	--	Mountain Brook (8/29)	Scottsboro (5/25)	St. Paul's (16/19)		Pleasant Valley (1/3)	
1998	--	Pelham (1/1)	Scottsboro (6/25)	St. Paul's (17/19)		Randolph (5/7)	
1999	--	Murphy (1/1)	Scottsboro (7/25)		Briarwood Christian (1/1)		
2000	--	Mountain Brook (9/29)	St Paul's (18/19)		Speake (1/2)		
2001	--	Mountain Brook (10/29)	Scottsboro (8/25)		Speake (2/2)		
2002	--	Austin (1/1)	Scottsboro (9/25)		Altamont (2/5)		
2003	--	Mountain Brook (11/29)	Scottsboro (10/25)	Lawrence County (1/9)		Altamont (3/5)	
2004	--	Mountain Brook (12/29)	Scottsboro (11/25)	UMS-Wright (1/8)		Altamont (4/5)	
2005	--	Mountain Brook (13/29)	Scottsboro (12/25)	UMS-Wright (2/8)		Bayside Academy (1/4)	
2006	--	Mountain Brook (14/29)	Scottsboro (13/25)	Montgomery Academy (1/8)		Cold Springs (1/8)	
2007	--	Mountain Brook (15/29)	Scottsboro (14/25)	Lawrence County (2/9)		American Christian (1/8)	
2008	--	Mountain Brook (16/29)	Scottsboro (15/25)	Rogers (1/2)	Montgomery Academy (2/8)	American Christian (2/8)	
2009	--	Mountain Brook (17/29)	Scottsboro (16/25)	UMS-Wright (3/8)	Montgomery Academy (3/8)	American Christian (3/8)	
2010	--	Mountain Brook (18/29)	Scottsboro (17/25)	UMS-Wright (4/8)	Rogers (2/2)	American Christian (4/8)	
2011	--	Mountain Brook (19/29)	Scottsboro (18/25)	UMS-Wright (5/8)	Montgomery Academy (4/8)	American Christian (5/8)	
2012	--	Mountain Brook (20/29)	Scottsboro (19/25)	UMS-Wright (6/8)	Bayside Academy (2/4)	Montgomery Academy (5/8)	
2013	--	Mountain Brook (21/29)	Scottsboro (20/25)	UMS-Wright (7/8)	Bayside Academy (3/4)	Montgomery Academy (6/8)	
2014	Mountain Brook (22/29)	John Carroll Catholic (1/2)	Lawrence County (3/9)	Wilson (1/2)	American Christian (6/8)	St. Bernard (1/2)	
2015	Mountain Brook (23/29)	John Carroll Catholic (2/2)	Lawrence County (4/9)	Wilson (2/2)	Pleasant Valley (2/3)	St. Bernard (2/2)	
2016	Huntsville (3/3)	Homewood (1/4)	St. Paul's (19/19)	Randolph (6/7)	Pleasant Valley (3/3)	Westminster-Oak Mountain (1/3)	
2017	Auburn (1/8)	Fort Payne (2/2)	Scottsboro (21/25)	Randolph (7/7)	TR Miller (1/1)	Westminster-Oak Mountain (2/3)	
2018	Auburn (2/8)	Homewood (2/4)	Scottsboro (22/25)	Catholic - Montgomery (1/1)	Westminster-Oak Mountain (3/3)	Cold Springs (2/8)	
2019	Auburn (3/8)	Homewood (3/4)	Scottsboro (23/25)	American Christian (7/8)	Saint James (1/1)	Whitesburg Christian (1/5)	
2020	Auburn (4/8)	Homewood (4/4)	Lawrence County (5/9)	American Christian (8/8)	Providence Christian (1/4)	Cold Springs (3/8)	
2021	Auburn (5/8)	Mountain Brook (24/29)	Lawrence County (6/9)	Bayside Academy (4/4)	Providence Christian (2/4)	Cold Springs (4/8)	
2022	Chelsea (1/1)	Mountain Brook (25/29)	Lawrence County (7/9)	Providence Christian (3/4)	Altamont (5/5)	St. Luke's Episcopal (1/1)	
2023	Auburn (6/8)	Mountain Brook (26/29)	Lawrence County (8/9)	Providence Christian (4/4)	Whitesburg Christian (2/5)	Cold Springs (5/8)	
2024	Auburn (7/8)	Mountain Brook (27/29)	Scottsboro (24/25)	Whitesburg Christian (3/5)	Montgomery Academy (7/8)	Cold Springs (6/8)	
2025	Auburn (8/8)	Mountain Brook (28/29)	Lawrence County (9/9)	Whitesburg Christian (4/5)	Montgomery Academy (8/8)	Cold Springs (7/8)	
Year	6A	5A	4A	3A	1A-2A	Double A	Single A
2026	Hewitt-Trussville (1/1)	Mountain Brook (29/29)	Scottsboro (25/25)	Plainview (1/1)	Cold Springs (8/8)	UMS-Wright (8/8)	Whitesburg Christian (5/5)

*tie broken by best sixth-place finisher

The Mountain Brook Spartans hold the all-time record with 29 titles.

St Paul’s Episcopal holds the most consecutive championships with 16 titles (1983–98).

== Flag Football ==
Since the tournament’s establishment in 2021, five tournaments have been held with a total of six champions.

Year	7A	6A	5A	4A	3A	2A	1A
2021	Hewitt-Trussville (1/1)						
2022	Auburn (1/1)						
2023	Central-Phenix City (1/3)		Wenonah (1/1)				
2024	Central-Phenix City (2/3)		Montgomery Catholic (1/1)				
2025	Central-Phenix City (3/3)		Moody (1/1)				

Central-Phenix City holds the all-time record with 3 titles.

== Football ==
=== Playoff Champions ===
Since the tournament’s establishment in 1966, sixty tournaments have been held with a total of 132 champions.

Year	7A	6A	5A	4A	3A	2A	1A
1966	--			Sidney Lanier (1/3)	--	--	--
1967	--			Sidney Lanier (2/3)	Russellville (1/2)	Lamar County (1/2)	Marengo County (1/1)
1968	--			Sidney Lanier (3/3)	Russellville (2/2)	Gordo (1/4)	Lowndes Academy (1/1)
1969	--			Robert E. Lee (1/5)	Sylacauga (1/1)	T. R. Miller (1/6)	Excel (1/1)
1970	--			Robert E. Lee (2/5)	Valley (1/1)	Addison (1/3)	Hazlewood (1/11)
1971	--			Decatur (1/1)	Tarrant (1/1)	Abbeville (1/1) & Oneonta (1/4)^{†}	Marion County (1/4)
1972	--			Banks (1/2)	Colbert County (1/6)	Oneonta (2/4)	Marion County (2/4)
1973	--			Banks (2/2)	John Carroll (1/1)	Glencoe (1/1)	Marion County (3/4)
1974	--			Homewood (1/6)	Escambia County (1/2)	Lauderdale County (1/1)	Carrollton (1/2)
1975	--			Mountain Brook (1/2)	Athens (1/2)	Hazlewood (2/11)	Ranburne (1/1)
1976	--			Mountain Brook (2/2)	Andalusia (1/3) & Athens (2/2)^{†}	Elmore County (1/3)	Addison (2/3)
1977	--			W. A. Berry (1/13)	Andalusia (2/3)	Stevenson (1/2)	Ohatchee (1/1)
1978	--			Jeff Davis (1/2)	Eufaula (1/2)	Elmore County (2/3)	Sweet Water (1/11)
1979	--			Enterprise (1/2)	Jackson (1/4) & Colbert County (2/6)^{†}	Stevenson (2/2)	Sweet Water (2/11)
1980	--			Vestavia Hills (1/2)	Charles Henderson (1/1)	Gordo (2/4)	Akron (1/1)
1981	--			Northview (1/2)	Eufaula (2/2)	Dadeville (1/1)	Hazlewood (3/11)
1982	--			Enterprise (2/2) & W.A. Berry (2/13)^{†}	Thompson (1/7)	Hazlewood (4/11)	Sweet Water (3/11)
1983	--			Murphy (1/1)	Escambia County (2/2)	Oak Grove (1/1)	Millport (1/2)
1984	--	Prattville (1/5)	Emma Sansom (1/1)	T. R. Miller (2/6)	Lamar County (2/2)	Millport (2/2)	Valley Head (1/1)
1985	--	Northview (2/2)	Colbert County (3/6)	Alexandria (1/3)	Gordo (3/4)	Hazlewood (5/11)	Sand Rock (1/1)
1986	--	Robert E. Lee (3/5)	Gadsden (1/2)	Litchfield (1/1)	Crossville (1/1)	Cottonwood (1/1)	Sweet Water (4/11)
1987	--	Vigor (1/4)	Greenville (1/2)	Elmore County (3/3)	UMS Prep (1/9)	Reeltown (1/4)	Montgomery Academy (1/1)
1988	--	Vigor (2/4)	Oxford (1/4)	Pike County (1/5)	Thomasville (1/2)	Hazlewood (6/11)	Courtland (1/5)
1989	--	Anniston (1/2)	Oxford (2/4)	Pike County (2/5)	Elba (1/4)	Hazlewood (7/11)	Courtland (2/5)
1990	--	Jess Lanier (1/1)	Blount (1/5)	Deshler (1/3)	Dallas County (1/1)	Hazlewood (8/11)	Courtland (3/5)
1991	--	Robert E. Lee (4/5)	Gadsden (2/2)	T. R. Miller (3/6)	Luverne (1/2)	Hazlewood (9/11)	McKenzie (1/1)
1992	--	Robert E. Lee (5/5)	Blount (2/5)	Daleville (1/1)	Elba (2/4)	Hazlewood (10/11)	Billingsley (1/2)
1993	--	Central-Phenix City (1/3)	Oxford (3/4)	North Jackson (1/1)	Colbert County (4/6)	St. Clair County (1/1)	Brantley (1/4)
1994	--	Anniston (2/2)	Greenville (2/2)	T. R. Miller (4/6)	Colbert County (5/6)	Clay County (1/6)	Carrollton (2/2)
1995	--	Central-Tuscaloosa (1/2)	Homewood (2/6)	Alexandria (2/3)	Cordova (1/2)	Clay County (2/6)	Courtland (4/5)
1996	--	Jeff Davis (2/2)	Blount (3/5)	Fayette County (1/1)	Colbert County (6/6)	Clay County (3/6)	Maplesville (1/5)
1997	--	Tuscaloosa County (1/1)	Blount (4/5)	Alexandria (3/3)	Aliceville (1/2)	Luverne (2/2)	Billingsley (2/2)
1998	--	Vestavia Hills (2/2)	Blount (5/5)	Deshler (2/3)	Briarwood Christian (1/3)	Southern Choctaw (1/3)	Brantley (2/4)
1999	--	Clay-Chalkville (1/5)	Etowah (1/1)	Deshler (3/3)	Briarwood Christian (2/3)	Southern Choctaw (2/3)	Courtland (5/5)
2000	--	Hoover (3/13)	Homewood (3/6)	T. R. Miller (5/6)	Aliceville (2/2)	Clay County (4/6)	Hazlewood (11/11)
2001	--	Daphne (1/2)	Benjamin Russell (1/1)	UMS-Wright (2/9)	Hokes Bluff (1/1)	Gordo (4/4)	Reeltown (2/4)
2002	--	Hoover (4/13)	Homewood (4/6)	UMS-Wright (3/9)	T. R. Miller (6/6)	Southern Choctaw (3/3)	Clay County (5/6)
2003	--	Hoover (5/13)	Briarwood (3/3)	Trinity (1/1)	Pike County (3/5)	Randolph County	Parrish (1/1)
2004	--	Hoover (6/13)	Homewood (5/6)	Demopolis (1/2)	Oneonta (3/4)	Leroy (1/7)	Sweet Water (5/11)
2005	--	Hoover (7/13)	Homewood (6/6)	UMS-Wright (4/9)	Pike County (4/5)	Clay County (6/6)	Addison (3/3)
2006	--	Prattville (2/5)	Athens (2/2)	Guntersville (1/1)	Pike County (5/5)	Leroy (2/7)	Sweet Water (6/11)
2007	--	Prattville (3/5)	St. Paul's Episcopal (1/5)	Central-Tuscaloosa (2/2)	Cordova (2/2)	Leroy (3/7)	Sweet Water (7/11)
2008	--	Prattville (4/5)	Vigor (3/4)	UMS-Wright (5/9)	Leeds (1/4)	Leroy (4/7)	Sweet Water (8/11)
2009	--	Hoover (8/13)	Demopolis (2/2)	Cherokee County (1/1)	Piedmont (1/5)	Reeltown (3/4)	Brantley (3/4)
2010	--	Daphne (2/2)	Spanish Fort (1/4)	Thomasville (2/2)	Leeds (2/4)	Leroy (5/7)	Sweet Water (9/11)
2011	--	Prattville (5/5)	Hartselle (1/1)	Jackson (2/4)	Handley (1/3)	Elba (3/4)	Marion County (4/4)
2012	--	Hoover (9/13)	Spanish Fort (2/4)	UMS-Wright (6/9)	Madison Academy (1/3)	Tanner (1/2)	Brantley (4/4)
2013	--	Hoover (10/13)	Spanish Fort (3/4)	Oneonta (4/4)	Madison Academy (2/3)	Tanner (2/2)	Pickens County (1/1)
2014	Hoover (11/13)	Clay-Chalkville (2/5)	St. Paul's Episcopal (2/5)	Leeds (3/4)	Madison Academy (3/3)	Fyffe (1/7)	Maplesville (2/5)
2015	McGill-Toolen (1/1)	Spanish Fort (4/4)	St. Paul's Episcopal (3/5)	Leeds (4/4)	Piedmont (2/5)	Elba (4/4)	Maplesville (3/5)
2016	Hoover (12/13)	Ramsay (1/2)	Beauregard (1/1)	Handley (2/3)	Piedmont (3/5)	Fyffe (2/4)	Maplesville (4/5)
2017	Hoover (13/13)	Pinson Valley (1/3)	St. Paul's Episcopal (4/5)	UMS-Wright (7/9)	Hillcrest-Evergreen (1/1)	Lanett (1/2)	Sweet Water (10/11)
2018	Central-Phenix City (2/3)	Pinson Valley (2/3)	Central Clay County (1/2)	UMS-Wright (8/9)	Flomaton (1/1)	Fyffe (3/7)	Mars Hill Bible (1/4)
2019	Thompson (2/7)	Oxford (4/4)	Central Clay County (2/2)	UMS-Wright (9/9)	Piedmont (4/5)	Fyffe (4/7)	Lanett (2/2)
2020	Thompson (3/7)	Pinson Valley (3/3)	St. Paul’s Episcopal (5/5)	Handley (3/3)	Fyffe (5/7)	Mars Hill Bible (2/4)	Linden (1/1)
2021	Thompson (4/7)	Clay-Chalkville (3/5)	Pike Road (1/1)	Vigor (4/4)	Piedmont (5/5)	Clarke County (1/1)	Sweet Water (11/11)
2022	Thompson (5/7)	Saraland (1/1)	Ramsay (2/2)	Andalusia (3/3)	St. James (1/1)	Fyffe (6/7)	Leroy (6/7)
2023	Central-Phenix City (3/3)	Clay-Chalkville (4/5)	Gulf Shores (1/1)	Montgomery Catholic (1/2)	Mobile Christian (1/1)	Fyffe (7/7)	Leroy (7/7)
2024	Thompson (6/7)	Parker (1/1)	Montgomery Catholic (2/2)	Jackson (3/4)	Mars Hill Bible (3/4)	Reeltown (4/4)	Wadley (1/1)
2025	Thompson (7/7)	Clay-Chalkville (5/5)	Moody (1/1)	Jackson (4/4)	Mars Hill Bible (4/4)	Coosa Christian (1/1)	Maplesville (5/5)

^{†} Co-Champions

Hoover holds the all-time record with 13 titles.

Hazlewood holds the most consecutive championships with 5 titles (1988–92).

=== Mythical Champions ===
Before the playoffs began in 1966, state champions were selected by The National Sports News Service.

Year	School
1920	Sidney Lanier (7–0–1)
1921	Tuscaloosa (9–0–0)
1922	Sidney Lanier (10–0–0)
1923	Undecided
1924	Butler (9–0–0)
1925	Tuscaloosa (8–0–1)
1926	Tuscaloosa (9–0–0)
1927	Tuscaloosa (9–0–0)
1928	Tuscaloosa (9–0–0) & Sidney Lanier (11–0–0)^{†}
1929	Tuscaloosa (9–0–0)
1930	Walker County (11–0–0)
1931	Tuscaloosa (9–0–2)
1932	Decatur (10–0–0)
1933	Decatur (9–0–0)
1934	Ramsay (9–0–0)
1935	Athens (9–0–0)
1936	Tuscaloosa (8–1–0)
1937	Woodlawn (7–1–0)
1938	Ensley (8–1–0)
1939	Sidney Lanier (9–0–0)
1940	Bessemer (9–0–0)
1941	Woodlawn (9–0–0)
1942	Woodlawn (9–0–0)
1943	Woodlawn (9–0–0)
1944	Gadsden (9–0–0)
1945	Ensley (9–0–0)
1946	Ensley (9–0–0)
1947	Ramsay (9–0–0)
1948	Aliceville (9–0–0)
1949	Tuscaloosa (9–0–0) & Decatur (9–0–0)^{†}
1950	Etowah (10–0–0)
1951	Bessemer (8–0–1)
1952	Bessemer (10–0–0)
1953	West End (9–1–0) & Ensley (9–1–0)^{†}
1954	Bessemer (10–0–0)
1955	Woodlawn (10–0–0)
1956	Woodlawn (10–0–0)
1957	Walker County (10–0–0)
1958	Robert E. Lee (10–0–0)
1959	Robert E. Lee (9–1–0)
1960	Robert E. Lee (9–0–1)
1961	Sidney Lanier (9–1–0)
1962	Cullman (10–0–0)
1963	Talladega (10–0–0)
1964	Tarrant (10–0–0)
1965	Banks (10-0-0)

^{†} Co-Champions

== Golf ==
=== Boys ===
Since the tournament’s establishment in 1949, seventy-six tournaments have been held with a total of sixty-three champions.

Year	7A	6A	5A	4A	3A	2A	1A
1949	--			A. G. Parrish (Selma) (1/3)			
1950	--			A. G. Parrish (Selma) (2/3) & Tuscaloosa (1/6)^{†}			
1951	--			Tuscaloosa (2/6)			
1952	--			Sidney Lanier (1/2)			
1953	--			Tuscaloosa (3/6)			
1954	--			Gadsden (1/3)			
1955	--			Dothan (1/3)			
1956	--			Murphy (1/2)			
1957	--			Shades Valley (1/1)			
1958	--			Gadsden (2/3)			
1959	--			Dothan (2/3)			
1960	--			McGill (1/4)			
1961	--			Murphy (2/2)			
1962	--			Lee-Montgomery (1/5)			
1963	--			Lee-Montgomery (2/5)			
1964	--			Lee-Montgomery (3/5)			
1965	--			Dothan (3/3)			
1966	--			Lee-Montgomery (4/5)			
1967	--			A.G. Parrish (Selma) (3/3)			
1968	--			Shaw (1/1)			
1969	--			Greenville (1/1)			
1970	--			Sidney Lanier (2/2)			
1971	--			University Military School* (1/27)			
1972	--			Gadsden (3/3)			
1973	--			Mountain Brook (1/11)			
1974	--			Lee-Montgomery (5/5)			
1975	--			Mountain Brook (2/11)			
1976	--			Tuscaloosa (4/6)			
1977	--			Tuscaloosa (5/6)			
1978	--			Jeff Davis (1/1)			
1979	--			Tuscaloosa (6/6)			
1980	--			UMS Prep (2/27)			
1981	--			Walker (1/2)			
1982	--			Davidson (1/1)			
1983	--			UMS Prep (3/27)			
1984	--			Walker* (2/2)			
1985	--	Grissom (1/1)					
1986	--	Central-Tuscaloosa (1/2)					
1987	--	McGill-Toolen (2/4)					
1988	--	McGill-Toolen (3/4)					
1989	--	McGill-Toolen (4/4)					
1990	--	UMS-Wright (4/27)					
1991	--	Vestavia Hills (1/7)					
1992	--	UMS-Wright (5/27)					
1993	--	UMS-Wright (6/27)					
1994	--	Vestavia Hills (2/7)	Fort Payne (1/4)	UMS-Wright (7/27)			
1995	--	Central-Tuscaloosa (2/2)	Athens (1/1)	UMS-Wright (8/27)			
1996	--	Enterprise (1/1)	Fort Payne (2/4)	UMS-Wright (9/27)			
1997	--	Mountain Brook (3/11)	Deshler (1/2)	UMS-Wright (10/27)			
1998	--	Benjamin Russell (1/1)	Fort Payne (3/4)	Deshler (2/2)	UMS-Wright (11/27)	Leroy (1/1)	
1999	--	Hoover (1/4)	Bradshaw (1/2)	St. Paul's (1/12)	UMS-Wright (12/27)	Donoho (1/4)	
2000	--	Hoover (2/4)	Bradshaw (2/2)	Brooks (1/3)	UMS-Wright (13/27)	Mars Hill Bible (1/1)	
2001	--	Hoover (3/4)	St. Paul's (2/12)	UMS-Wright (14/27)	Gulf Shores (1/2)	Houston Academy (1/9)	
2002	--	Decatur (1/1)	St. Paul's (3/12)	UMS-Wright (15/27)	Gulf Shores (2/2)	Houston Academy (2/9)	
2003	--	Hoover (4/4)	St. Paul's (4/12)	UMS-Wright (16/27)	Montgomery Academy (1/10)	Houston Academy (3/9)	
2004	--	Auburn (1/4)	St. Paul's (5/12)	Andalusia (1/3)	Montgomery Academy (2/10)	Houston Academy (4/9)	
2005	--	Auburn (2/4)	Oxford (1/1)	Andalusia (2/3)	Montgomery Academy (3/10)	Houston Academy (5/9)	
2006	--	Auburn (3/4)	Briarwood (1/2)	Andalusia (3/3)	Montgomery Academy (4/10)	Donoho (2/4)	
2007	--	Auburn (4/4)	Briarwood (2/2)	Boaz (1/2)	Montgomery Academy (5/10)	Donoho (3/4) & Houston Academy (6/9)^{†}	
2008	--	Spain Park (1/8)	UMS-Wright (17/27)	Boaz (2/2)	Montgomery Academy (6/10)	Shoals Christian (1/4)	
2009	--	Spain Park (2/8)	St. Paul's (6/12)	UMS-Wright (18/27)	Cottage Hill (1/1)	Shoals Christian (2/4)	
2010	--	Spain Park (3/8)	St. Paul's (7/12)	UMS-Wright (19/27)	Montgomery Academy (7/10)	Shoals Christian (3/4)	
2011	--	Mountain Brook (4/11)	St. Paul's (8/12)	UMS-Wright (20/27)	Montgomery Academy (8/10)	Shoals Christian (4/4)	
2012	--	Spain Park (4/8)	Fort Payne (4/4)	Oneonta (1/1)	Montgomery Academy (9/10)	Providence Christian (1/4)	
2013	--	Spain Park (5/8)	St. Paul's (9/12)	Guntersville (1/2)	Bayside Academy (1/3)	St. Luke's (1/2)	
2014	--	Spain Park (6/8)	Spanish Fort	UMS-Wright (21/27)	Bayside Academy (2/3)	Providence Christian (2/4)	
2015	Mountain Brook (5/11)	Hartselle	Russellville (1/1)	St. James (1/1)	Westbrook Christian (1/5)	St. Lukes (2/2)	
2016	Spain Park (7/8)	Homewood (1/3)	St. Paul's (10/12)	UMS-Wright (22/27)	Westbrook Christian (2/5)	Providence Christian (3/4)	
2017	Mountain Brook (6/11)	Muscle Shoals (1/3)	St. Paul's (11/12)	UMS-Wright (23/27)	Providence Christian (4/4)	Westbrook Christian (3/5)	
2018	Mountain Brook (7/11)	Muscle Shoals (2/3)	St. Paul’s (12/12)	UMS-Wright (24/27)	Houston Academy (7/9)	Donoho (4/4)	
2019	Mountain Brook (8/11)	Muscle Shoals (3/3)	UMS-Wright (25/27)	Brooks (2/3)	Houston Academy (8/9)	North Sand Mountain (1/3)	
2020	No competition due to COVID-19 pandemic						
2021	Vestavia Hills (3/7)	Mountain Brook (9/11)	Guntersville (2/2)	White Plains	Houston Academy (9/9)	Elba (1/2)	
2022	Vestavia Hills (4/7)	Mountain Brook (10/11)	UMS-Wright (26/27)	Haleyville (1/4)	Bayside Academy (3/3)	Elba (2/2)	
2023	Vestavia Hills (5/7)	UMS-Wright (27/27)	Randolph (1/2)	Haleyville (2/4)	Westbrook Christian (4/5)	North Sand Mountain (2/3)	
2024	Spain Park (8/8)	Homewood (2/3)	Randolph (2/2)	Haleyville (3/4)	Westbrook Christian (5/5)	North Sand Mountain (3/3)	
2025	Vestavia Hills (6/7)	Homewood (3/3)	West Point (1/1)	Haleyville (4/4)	Lee-Scott Academy (1/1)	Bayshore Christian (1/1)	
2026	Vestavia Hills (7/7)	Mountain Brook (11/11)	Scottsboro (1/1)	Brooks (3/3)	Montgomery Academy (10/10)	Lindsay Lane (1/1)	

^{†} Co-Champions
*Sudden death playoff

UMS-Wright holds the all-time record with 27 titles.

UMS-Wright holds the most consecutive championships with 10 titles (1991-01).

=== Girls ===
Since the tournament’s establishment in 1973, fifty-two tournaments have been held with a total of thirty-four champions.

Year	7A	6A	5A	4A	3A	2A	1A
1972	No team competition						
1973	--			Vestavia Hills (1/2)			
1974	--			Vestavia Hills (2/2)			
1975	--			Tuscaloosa (1/1)			
1976	--			McGill-Toolen (1/14)			
1977	--			McGill-Toolen (2/14)			
1978	--			McGill-Toolen (3/14)			
1979	--			Mountain Brook (1/10)			
1980	--			Mountain Brook (2/10)			
1981	--			Mountain Brook (3/10)			
1982	--			Mountain Brook (4/10)			
1983	--			Bradshaw (1/1)			
1984	--			Mountain Brook (5/10)*			
1985	--	Coffee (1/1)					
1986	--	Central-Tuscaloosa (1/1)					
1987	--	W. A. Berry (1/7)					
1988	--	Walker (1/2)					
1989	--	Walker (2/2)					
1990	--	McGill-Toolen (4/14)					
1991	--	McGill-Toolen (5/14)					
1992	--	McGill-Toolen (6/14)					
1993	--	Citronelle (1/1)					
1994	--	McGill-Toolen (7/14)					
1995	--	McGill-Toolen (8/14)					
1996	--	McGill-Toolen (9/14)					
1997	--	McGill-Toolen (10/14)					
1998	--	McGill-Toolen (11/14)					
1999	--	McGill-Toolen (12/14)					
2000	--	McGill-Toolen (13/4)					
2001	--	Hoover (2/7)					
2002	--	Hoover (3/7)					
2003	--	Hoover (4/7)					
2004	--	Hoover (5/7)					
2005	--	Hewitt-Trussville (1/1)					
2006	--	Mountain Brook (6/10)					
2007	--	Mountain Brook (7/10)	St. Paul's (1/1)				
2008	--	Central-Phenix City (1/1)	Alexandria (1/2)				
2009	--	Spain Park (1/4)	Hartselle (1/4)				
2010	--	Auburn (1/4)	Hartselle (2/4)				
2011	--	Mountain Brook (8/10)	Hartselle (3/4)				
2012	--	Mountain Brook (9/10)	Hartselle (4/4)				
2013	--	Mountain Brook (10/10)	Muscle Shoals (1/4)				
2014	--	Hoover (6/7)	Muscle Shoals (2/4)				
2015	Hoover (7/7)		White Plains (1/3)		Glencoe (1/1)		
2016	Huntsville (1/1)		White Plains (2/3)		Westbrook Christian (1/1)		
2017	Spain Park (2/4)	Muscle Shoals (3/4)	Trinity Presbyterian (1/2)		Providence Christian (1/3)		
2018	Auburn (2/4)	Muscle Shoals (4/4)	Northside (1/1)		Providence Christian (2/3)		
2019	Auburn (3/4)	Northridge (1/1)	Randolph (1/1)		Providence Christian (3/3)		
2020	No competition due to COVID-19 pandemic						
2021	Spain Park (3/4)	McGill-Toolen (14/14)	White Plains (3/3)		Bayside Academy (1/1)		
2022	Spain Park (4/4)	UMS-Wright (1/2)	Pike Road (1/4)		Mars Hill Bible (1/1)		
2023	Grissom (1/2)	Pike Road (2/4)	Trinity Presbyterian (2/2)		Tuscaloosa Academy (1/3)		
2024	UMS-Wright (2/2)	Pike Road (3/4)	Alexandria (2/2)		Tuscaloosa Academy (2/3)		
2025	Auburn (4/4)	Pike Road (4/4)	Tuscaloosa Academy (3/3)		Wicksburg (1/1)		
2026	Grissom (2/2)	Spanish Fort (1/1)	West Point (1/1)		Pike Liberal Arts (1/1)		

*Sudden death playoff

McGill-Toolen holds the all-time record with 14 titles.

McGill-Toolen holds the most consecutive championships with 7 titles (1994-00).

== Indoor track ==
=== Boys ===
Since the tournament’s establishment in 1966, fifty-five tournaments have been held with a total of fifty-three champions.

Year	7A	6A	5A	4A	3A	2A	1A
1966	--			Shades Valley (1/1)	Birmingham University School (1/2)		
1967	--			Sidney Lanier (1/1)	Birmingham University School (2/2)		
1968	--			Robert E. Lee (1/8)	Auburn (1/6)		
1969	--			Robert E. Lee (2/8)	Auburn (2/6)		
1970	--			Robert E. Lee (3/8)	Auburn (3/6)		
1971	--			Robert E. Lee (4/8)	Auburn (4/6)		
1972	--			Jeff Davis (1/3)	University Military School (1/16)		
1973	--			Jeff Davis (2/3)	John Carroll (1/2) & Sylacauga (1/1)^{†}		
1974	--			Robert E. Lee (5/8)	Athens (1/3)		
1975	--			Mountain Brook (1/4)	Cullman (1/1)		
1976	--			Davidson (1/6)	Athens (2/3)		
1977	--			Jeff Davis (3/3)	Athens (3/3)		
1978	--			Robert E. Lee (6/8)	Gardendale (1/6)		
1979	--			Robert E. Lee (7/8)	Gardendale (2/6)	Calhoun (1/2)	
1980	--			Robert E. Lee (8/8)	Gardendale (3/6)	Hazlewood (1/1)	
1981	--			Davidson (2/6)	UMS Prep (2/16)	Notasulga (1/1)	
1982	--			Davidson (3/6)	UMS Prep (3/16)	Calhoun (2/2)	
1983	--			Central-Tuscaloosa (1/6)	UMS Prep (4/16)	Warrior (1/1)	
1984	--			Davidson (4/6)	Gardendale (4/6)	St. Paul's (1/12)	
1985	--	Davidson (5/6)	UMS Prep (5/16)		St. Paul's (2/12)		
1986	--	Davidson (6/6)	T.R. Miller (1/3)		Vincent (1/1)		
1987	--	Murphy (1/4)	Williamson (1/1)		St. Paul's (3/12)		
1988	--	Murphy (2/4)	Gardendale (5/6)		St. Paul's (4/12)		
1989	--	Gardendale (6/6)	Blount (1/3)		St. Paul's (5/12)		
1990	--	Murphy (3/4)	Mobile County (1/1)		St. Paul's (6/12)		
1991	--	Murphy (4/4)	Blount (2/3)		St. Paul's (7/12)		
1992	--	Theodore (1/2)	Grand Bay (1/1)	T.R. Miller (2/3)		Coffeeville (1/1)	
1993	No competition						
1994	--	Central-Tuscaloosa (2/6)	Smiths Station (1/4)	St. Paul's (8/12)		Sweet Water (1/1)	
1995	--	Central-Tuscaloosa (3/6)	Smiths Station (2/4)	St. Paul's (9/12)		Oneonta (1/1)	
1996	--	Central-Tuscaloosa (4/6)	Smiths Station (3/4)		St. Paul's (10/12)		
1997	--	Central-Tuscaloosa (5/6)	Smiths Station (4/4)		UMS-Wright (6/16)		
1998	--	Hoover (1/14)	Blount (3/3)		UMS-Wright (7/16)		
1999	--	Theodore (2/2)	Madison County (1/1)		UMS-Wright (8/16)		
2000	--	Central-Tuscaloosa (6/6)	John Carroll (2/2)		UMS-Wright (9/16)		
2001	--	Grissom (1/1)	Scottsboro (1/12)	Leeds (1/2)			
2002	--	Hoover (2/14)	Scottsboro (2/12)	Leeds (2/2)			
2003	--	Hoover (3/14)	Scottsboro (3/12)	Altamont (1/3)			
2004	--	Hoover (4/14)	Scottsboro (4/12)	Altamont (2/3)			
2005	--	Mountain Brook (2/4)	Scottsboro (5/12)	Altamont (3/3)			
2006	--	Mountain Brook (3/4)	Homewood (1/8)	UMS-Wright (10/16)			
2007	--	Mountain Brook (4/4)	St. Paul's (11/12)	Falkville (1/1)			
2008–2011	No Competition						
2012	--	Spain Park (1/1)	St. Paul's (12/12)	UMS-Wright (11/16)			
2013	--	Hoover (5/14)	Homewood (2/8)	UMS-Wright (12/16)			
2014	--	Hoover (6/14)	Homewood (3/8)	UMS-Wright (13/16)			
2015	Auburn (5/6)	Homewood (4/8)	UMS Wright (14/16)		Winfield City (1/5)		
2016	Auburn (6/6)	Opelika (1/3)	Northside (1/1)		Winfield City (2/5)		
2017	Hoover (7/14)	Opelika (2/3)	Scottsboro (6/12)		American Christian (1/2)		
2018	Hoover (8/14)	Homewood (5/8)	Guntersville (1/1)		American Christian (2/2)		
2019	Hoover (9/14)	Homewood (6/8)	Scottsboro (7/12)		Winfield City (3/5)		
2020	Hoover (10/14)	Homewood (7/8)	Scottsboro (8/12)		Bayside Academy (1/1)		
2021	Hewitt-Trussville (1/2)	Opelika (3/3)	UMS-Wright (15/16)		Winfield City (4/5)		
2022	Hoover (11/14)	Scottsboro (9/12)	UMS-Wright (16/16)		Winfield City (5/5)		
2023	Hoover (12/14)	McGill-Toolen (1/1)	Scottsboro (10/12)		Cold Springs (1/2)		
2024	Hoover (13/14)	Northridge (1/2)	Scottsboro (11/12)		Cold Springs (2/2)		
2025	Hoover (14/14)	Homewood (8/8)	Hamilton (1/1)		Dadeville (1/1)		
2026	Hewitt-Trussville (2/2)	Northridge (2/2)	Scottsboro (12/12)		T.R. Miller (3/3)		

^{†} Co-Champions

UMS-Wright holds the all-time record with 16 titles.

Scottsboro holds the most consecutive championships with 5 titles (2001–05) (Tie).

St. Paul’s Episcopal holds the most consecutive championships with 5 titles (1987–91) (Tie).

=== Girls ===
Since the tournament’s establishment in 1975, forty-six tournaments have been held with a total of forty-three champions.

Year	7A	6A	5A	4A	3A	2A	1A
1975	--			Mountain Brook (1/25)			
1976	--			Mountain Brook (2/25)			
1977	--			Mountain Brook (3/25)			
1978	--			Mountain Brook (4/25)	Walter Wellborn (1/1)		
1979	--			Mountain Brook (5/25)	Guntersville (1/1)	Vincent (1/4)	
1980	--			Grissom (1/3)	Gardendale (1/1)	Springville (1/2)	
1981	--			Mountain Brook (6/25)	J.T. Wright (1/3)	Springville (2/2)	
1982	--			Mountain Brook (7/25)	J.T. Wright (2/3)	Vincent (2/4)	
1983	--			Mountain Brook (8/25)	Clarke County (1/3)	Vincent (3/4)	
1984	--			Mountain Brook (9/25)	J.T. Wright (3/3)	Vincent (4/4)	
1985	--	Murphy (1/1)	Abbeville (1/1)		St. Paul's (1/23)		
1986	--	Grissom (2/3)	Robertsdale (1/1)		St. Paul's (2/23)		
1987	--	Grissom (3/3)	Mobile County (1/1)		Randolph (1/3) & St. Paul's (3/23)^{†}		
1988	--	Huntsville (1/2)	Clarke County (2/3)		St. Paul's (4/23)		
1989	--	Huntsville (2/2)	Williamson (1/1)		St. Paul's (5/23)		
1990	--	W. A. Berry (1/14)	Fort Payne (1/1)		Briarwood Christian (1/4)		
1991	--	Mountain Brook (10/25)	Clarke County (3/3)		St. Paul's (6/23)		
1992	--	Mountain Brook (11/25)	Cullman (1/2)	St. Paul's (7/23)		Randolph (2/3)	
1993	No competition						
1994	--	Mountain Brook (12/25)	Cullman (2/2)	St. Paul's (8/23)		Randolph (3/3)	
1995	--	Mountain Brook (13/25)	Smiths Station (1/1)	St. Paul's (9/23)		Oneonta (1/1)	
1996	--	Mountain Brook (14/25)	John Carroll (1/1)		St. Paul's (10/23)		
1997	--	Pelham (1/4)	St. Paul's (11/23)		UMS-Wright (1/5)		
1998	--	Pelham (2/4)	St. Paul's (12/23)		Briarwood Christian (2/4)		
1999	--	Hewitt-Trussville (1/2)	St. Paul's (13/23)		Briarwood Christian (3/4)		
2000	--	Mountain Brook (15/25)	St. Paul's (14/23)		Briarwood Christian (4/4)		
2001	--	Mountain Brook (16/25)	Scottsboro (1/5)	UMS-Wright (2/5)			
2002	--	Mountain Brook (17/25)	Scottsboro (2/5)	St. James (1/3)			
2003	--	Mountain Brook (18/25)	Scottsboro (3/5)	Altamont (1/8)			
2004	--	Mountain Brook (19/25)	Northridge (1/4)	Altamont (2/8)			
2005	--	Vestavia Hills (1/1)	Northridge (2/4)	Altamont (3/8)			
2006	--	Hoover (2/14)	St. Paul's (15/23)	Altamont (4/8)			
2007	--	Mountain Brook (20/25)	St. Paul's (16/23)	Altamont (5/8)			
2008–2011	No competition						
2012	--	Hoover (3/14)	St. Paul's (17/23)	UMS-Wright (3/5)			
2013	--	Mountain Brook (21/25)	St. Paul's (18/23)	UMS-Wright (4/5)			
2014	--	Hoover (4/14)	St. Paul's (19/23)	Beauregard (1/1)			
2015	Hoover (5/14)	Pelham (3/4)	St. Paul's (20/23)		American Christian (1/4)		
2016	Hoover (6/14)	Pelham (4/4)	St. Paul's (21/23)		American Christian (2/4)		
2017	Hoover (7/14)	Homewood (1/4)	St. Paul's (22/23)		American Christian (3/4)		
2018	Hoover (8/14)	Homewood (2/4)	St. Paul's (23/23)		American Christian (4/4)		
2019	Mountain Brook (22/25)	Homewood (3/4)	Montgomery Catholic (1/1)		St. James (2/3)		
2020	Hoover (9/14)	Homewood (4/4)	Scottsboro (4/5)		St. James (3/3)		
2021	Hewitt-Trussville (2/2)	Northridge (3/4)	Brewbaker Tech (1/1)		Providence Christian (1/1)		
2022	Hoover (10/14)	Northridge (4/4)	UMS-Wright (5/5)		Mobile Christian (1/1)		
2023	Hoover (11/14)	Mountain Brook (23/25)	Lawrence County (1/1)		Altamont (6/8)		
2024	Hoover (12/14)	Mountain Brook (24/25)	Scottsboro (5/5)		Houston Academy (1/1)		
2025	Hoover (13/14)	Chelsea (1/1)	Bayside Academy (1/1)		Altamont (7/8)		
2026	Hoover (14/14)	Mountain Brook (25/25)	Whitesburg Christian (1/1)		Altamont (8/8)		

^{†} Co-Champions

Mountain Brook holds the all-time record with 25 titles.

St. Paul’s Episcopal holds the most consecutive championships with 9 titles (2006–07)(2012–18) (Tie).

St. Paul’s Episcopal holds the most consecutive championships with 9 titles (1991-00) (Tie).

== Soccer ==
=== Boys ===
Since the tournament’s establishment in 1991, thirty-four tournaments have been held with a total of thirty-seven champions.

Year	7A	6A	5A	4A	3A-1A
1991	--	Vestavia Hills (1/4)	Gadsden (1/4)		
1992	--	Grissom (1/8)	Gadsden (2/4)		
1993	--	Central-Tuscaloosa (1/1)	Gadsden (3/4)		
1994	--	Grissom (2/8)	John Carroll (1/11)		
1995	--	Vestavia Hills (2/4)	Gadsden (4/4)		
1996	--	Grissom (3/8)	John Carroll (2/11)		
1997	--	Grissom (4/8)	John Carroll (3/11)		
1998	--	Grissom (5/8)	John Carroll (4/11)		
1999	--	Grissom (6/8)	John Carroll (5/11)		
2000	--	Grissom (7/8)	John Carroll (6/11)	Randolph (1/8)	
2001	--	Shades Valley (1/3)	Briarwood (1/6)	Randolph (2/8)	
2002	--	McGill-Toolen (1/1)	Cullman (1/2)	Randolph (3/8)	
2003	--	Hoover (1/2)	Homewood (1/7)	Altamont (1/3)	
2004	--	Shades Valley (2/3)	Briarwood (2/6)	Trinity (1/1)	
2005	--	Oak Mountain (1/8)	Homewood (2/7)	Holy Spirit (1/1)	
2006	--	Shades Valley (3/3)	Homewood (3/7)	Randolph (4/8)	
2007	--	Oak Mountain (2/8)	Briarwood (3/6)	Randolph (5/8)	
2008	--	Oak Mountain (3/8)	John Carroll (7/11)	Indian Springs (1/5)	
2009	--	Fairhope (1/1)	John Carroll (8/11)	Altamont (2/3)	
2010	--	Grissom (8/8)	John Carroll (9/11)	UMS-Wright (1/2)	
2011	--	Oak Mountain (4/8)	Fort Payne (1/3)	UMS-Wright (2/2)	
2012	--	Auburn (1/3)	John Carroll (10/11)	Altamont (3/3)	
2013	--	Vestavia Hills (3/4)	Briarwood (4/6)	Collinsville (1/2)	
2014	--	Vestavia Hills (4/4)	Homewood (4/7)	Indian Springs (2/5)	
2015	Oak Mountain (5/8)	Fort Payne (2/3)	Randolph (6/8)		Westminster Oak Mountain (1/4)
2016	Oak Mountain (6/8)	Cullman (2/2)	Helena (1/1)		Bayside Academy (1/6)
2017	Oak Mountain (7/8)	Pelham (1/1)	Randolph (7/8)		Indian Springs (3/5)
2018	Auburn (2/3)	Homewood (5/7)	Randolph (8/8)		Westminster Oak Mountain (2/4)
2019	Hoover (2/2)	St. Paul's (1/1)	Briarwood (5/6)		Bayside Academy (2/6)
2020	No competition due to COVID-19 pandemic				
2021	Spain Park (1/1)	Homewood (6/7)	Indian Springs (4/5)		Bayside Academy (3/6)
2022	Daphne (1/2)	Mountain Brook (1/1)	Indian Springs (5/5)		Bayside Academy (4/6)
2023	Daphne (2/2)	Fort Payne (3/3)	John Carroll (11/11)	Bayside Academy (5/6)	Tanner (1/1)
2024	Oak Mountain (8/8)	Homewood (7/7)	Gulf Shores (1/1)	Bayside Academy (6/6)	St. Luke’s Episcopal (1/1)
2025	Montgomery Academy (1/1)	Southside-Gadsden (1/1)	Guntersville (1/1)	Westminster-Oak Mountain (3/4)	Collinsville (2/2)
2026	Auburn (3/3)	Briarwood (6/6)	St. Michael Catholic (1/1)	Westminster-Oak Mountain (4/4)	Susan Moore (1/1)

John Carroll Catholic holds the all-time record with 11 titles.

Bayside Academy holds the most consecutive championships with 5 titles (2019-2024) (Tie).

Grissom holds the most consecutive championships with 5 titles (1996-00) (Tie).

John Carroll Catholic holds the most consecutive championships with 5 titles (1996-00) (Tie).

=== Girls ===
Since the tournament’s establishment in 1991, thirty-four tournaments have been held with a total of thirty-three champions.

Year	7A	6A	5A	4A	1A-3A
1991	--	W. A. Berry (1/3)	Fort Payne (1/8)		
1992	--	W. A. Berry (2/3)	Fort Payne (2/8)		
1993	--	W. A. Berry (3/3)	Fort Payne (3/8)		
1994	--	Mountain Brook (1/5)	Fort Payne (4/8)		
1995	--	Mountain Brook (2/5)	Fort Payne (5/8)		
1996	--	Grissom (1/5)	Fort Payne (6/8)		
1997	--	Grissom (2/5)	Briarwood (1/10)		
1998	--	Grissom (3/5)	Briarwood (2/10)		
1999		Grissom (4/5)	Briarwood (3/10)		
2000	--	Huntsville (1/4)	John Carroll (1/5)	Briarwood (4/10)	
2001	--	Vestavia Hills (1/7)	Fort Payne (7/8)	Montgomery Academy (1/9)	
2002	--	Huntsville (2/4)	Briarwood (5/10)		
2003	--	Bob Jones (1/1)	Fort Payne (8/8)	Indian Springs (1/4)	
2004	--	Spain Park (1/5)	Huntsville (3/4)	Altamont (1/3)	
2005	--	Vestavia Hills (2/7)	Huntsville (4/4)	Indian Springs (2/4)	
2006	--	Grissom (5/5)	Briarwood (6/10)	Altamont (2/3)	
2007	--	Vestavia Hills (3/7)	Briarwood (7/10)	Altamont (3/3)	
2008	--	Mountain Brook (3/5)	Decatur (1/1)	Guntersville (1/3)	
2009	--	Spain Park (2/5)	St. Paul's (1/2)	Randolph (1/3)	
2010	--	Spain Park (3/5)	Briarwood (8/10)	Guntersville (2/3)	
2011	--	Spain Park (4/5)	Spanish Fort (1/1)	Montgomery Academy (2/9)	
2012	--	Oak Mountain (1/4)	Chelsea (1/2)	Montgomery Academy (3/9)	
2013	--	Mountain Brook (4/5)	Athens (1/1)	Randolph (2/3)	
2014	--	Oak Mountain (2/4)	John Carroll (2/5)	Montgomery Academy (4/9)	
2015	Oak Mountain (3/4)	John Carroll (3/5)	Randolph (3/3)		Montgomery Academy (5/9)
2016	Vestavia Hills (4/7)	John Carroll (4/5)	Guntersville (3/3)		Holy Spirit (1/1)
2017	McGill-Toolen (1/1)	Chelsea (2/2)	Briarwood (9/10)		Montgomery Academy (6/9)
2018	Vestavia Hills (5/7)	John Carroll (5/5)	Trinity Presbyterian (1/3)		Montgomery Academy (7/9)
2019	Vestavia Hills (6/7)	Homewood (1/3)	Montgomery Academy (8/9)		Westminster-Oak Mountain (1/2)
2020	No competition due to COVID-19 pandemic				
2021	Oak Mountain (4/4)	St. Pauls (2/2)	Montgomery Academy (9/9)		Trinity Presbyterian (2/3)
2022	Spain Park (5/5)	Homewood (2/3)	Indian Springs (3/4)		Trinity Presbyterian (3/3)
2023	Sparkman (1/1)	Homewood (3/3)	Springville (1/2)	Westminster Christian (1/3)	Westminster-Oak Mountain (2/2)
2024	Auburn (1/2)	Mountain Brook (5/5)	Springville (2/2)	Westminster Christian (2/3)	St. James (1/1)
2025	Vestavia Hills (7/7)	Briarwood (10/10)	Westminster Christian (3/3)	St. John Paul ll (1/1)	Lee-Scott Academy (1/2)
2026	Auburn (2/2)	Northridge (1/1)	Indian Springs (4/4)	St. Luke’s Episcopal (1/1)	Lee-Scott Academy (2/2)

Briarwood Christian holds the all-time record with 10 titles.

Fort Payne holds the most consecutive championships with 6 titles (1991–96).

== Softball ==
=== Fast Pitch ===
Since the tournament’s establishment in 1995, thirty-one tournaments have been held with a total of seventy-two champions.

Year	7A	6A	5A	4A	3A	2A	1A
1995	--	Robertsdale (1/3)					
1996	--	Robertsdale (2/3)		St. James (1/6)			
1997	--	Hoover (1/5)	Robertsdale (3/3)		Trinity (1/2)		
1998	--	Hoover (2/5)	Thompson (1/4)		Alabama Christian (1/9)		
1999	--	Thompson (2/4)	Mortimer Jordan (1/4)		Alabama Christian (2/9)		
2000	--	Grissom (1/1)	Hartselle (1/5)	Brooks (1/1)		Madison Academy (1/2)	
2001	--	Hoover (3/5)	Oak Mountain (1/1)	St. James (2/6)	Madison Academy (2/2)	Pisgah (1/10)	
2002	--	Hoover (4/5)	Hartselle (2/5)	Trinity (2/2)	Alabama Christian (3/9)	Pisgah (2/10)	Athens Bible (1/2)
2003	--	Baker (1/4)	Hartselle (3/5)	Demopolis (1/1)	Alabama Christian (4/9)	Pisgah (3/10)	Waterloo (1/3)
2004	--	Hoover (5/5)	Buckhorn (1/3)	Alexandria (1/2)	Alabama Christian (5/9)	Pisgah (4/10)	Ragland (1/4)
2005	--	Baker (2/4)	Hueytown (1/4)	St. James (3/6)	Pisgah (5/10)	Flomaton (1/1)	Waterloo (2/3)
2006	--	Sparkman (1/6)	Hueytown (2/4)	St. James (4/6)	Alabama Christian (6/9)	Ider (1/3)	Waterloo (3/3)
2007	--	Baker (3/4)	Gulf Shores (1/1)	Alabama Christian (7/9)	Leeds (1/1)	Oakman (1/1)	Kinston (1/3)
2008	--	Hueytown (3/4)	Mortimer Jordan (2/4)	St. James (5/6)	Pisgah (6/10)	Ider (2/3)	Athens Bible (2/2)
2009	--	Sparkman (2/6)	Mortimer Jordan (3/4)	Alabama Christian (8/9)	West Morgan (1/1)	Ider (3/3)	Speake (1/1)
2010	--	Hueytown (4/4)	Athens (1/3)	Ardmore (1/1)	Sumiton Christian (1/4)	Hatton (1/6)	Ragland (2/4)
2011	--	Dothan (1/1)	Mortimer Jordan (4/4)	Dallas County (1/1)	Pisgah (7/10)	Hatton (2/6)	Ragland (3/4)
2012	--	Sparkman (3/6)	Chelsea (1/2)	Haleyville (1/2)	Saks (1/1)	Hatton (3/6)	Ragland (4/4)
2013	--	Sparkman (4/6)	Hayden (1/3)	Haleyville (2/2)	Pisgah (8/10)	Hatton (4/6)	Parrish (1/1)
2014	--	Sparkman (5/6)	Hartselle (4/5)	Alexandria (2/2)	Winfield (1/1)	Hale County (1/4)	Brantley (1/6)
2015	Baker (4/4)	Wetumpka (1/2)	Springville (1/4)	Curry (1/3)	Hale County (2/4)	Sumiton Christian School (2/4)	Brantley (2/6)
2016	Sparkman (6/6)	Chelsea (2/2)	Springville (2/4)	Curry (2/3)	Hale County (3/4)	Sumiton Christian School (3/4)	Brantley (3/6)
2017	Buckhorn (2/3)	Hazel Green (1/2)	Springville (3/4)	Northside (1/1)	Pisgah (9/10)	Hatton (5/6)	Sumiton Christian School (4/4)
2018	Fairhope (1/1)	Hartselle (5/5)	Springville (4/4)	Hale County (4/4)	Prattville Christian	G.W. Long (1/2)	Brantley (4/6)
2019	Hewitt-Trussville (1/5)	Buckhorn (3/3)	Hayden (2/3)	Alabama Christian (9/9)	Pisgah (10/10)	G.W. Long (2/2)	Mars Hill Bible (1/1)
2020	No competition due to COVID-19 pandemic						
2021	Hewitt-Trussville (2/5)	Hazel Green (2/2)	Satsuma (1/1)	North Jackson (1/1)	Plainview (1/2)	Orange Beach (1/6)	Brantley (5/6)
2022	Thompson (3/4)	Athens (2/3)	Hayden (3/3)	Curry (3/3)	Houston Academy (1/1)	Orange Beach (2/6)	Holy Spirit (1/1)
2023	Hewitt-Trussville (3/5)	Wetumpka (2/2)	Brewbaker Tech (1/1)	Orange Beach (3/6)	Plainview (2/2)	Hatton (6/6)	Brantley (6/6)
2024	Hewitt-Trussville (4/5)	Athens (3/3)	Jasper (1/1)	Orange Beach (4/6)	Opp (1/1)	Wicksburg (1/2)	Skyline (1/1)
2025	Thompson (4/4)	Helena (1/1)	Moody (1/1)	Orange Beach (5/6)	Wicksburg (2/2)	Zion Chapel (1/1)	Kinston (2/3)
2026	Hewitt-Trussville (5/5)	Saraland (1/1)	Lawrence County (1/1)	Orange Beach (6/6)	St. James (6/6)	Lamar County (1/1)	Kinston (3/3)

Pisgah holds the all-time record with 10 titles.

Pisgah holds the most consecutive championships with 5 titles (2001–05).

=== Slow Pitch ===
Since the tournament’s establishment in 1986, seventeen tournaments have been held with a total of thirty-four champions.

Year	6A	5A	4A	3A	2A	1A
1986	Satsuma (1/3)			Pleasant Valley (1/9)		
1987	Satsuma (2/3)		Haleyville (1/1)		Falkville (1/1)	
1988	Mary Montgomery (1/1)		Pleasant Valley (2/9)		Gaston (1/4)	
1989	Arab (1/2)	Athens (1/3)	New Hope (1/4)	Pleasant Valley (3/9)	Gaston (2/4)	Hubbertville (1/3)
1990	Satsuma (3/3)	Athens (2/3)	New Hope (2/4)	Pleasant Valley (4/9)	Gaston (3/4)	Hubbertville (2/3)
1991	Baker (1/3)	Cullman (1/3)	Carbon Hill (1/1)	Pleasant Valley (5/9)	Gaston (4/4)	Hubbertville (3/3)
1992	Baker (2/3)	Arab (2/2)	Ashford (1/3)	Pleasant Valley (6/9)	Hatton (1/3)	Speake (1/1)
1993	Baker (3/3)	Sparkman (1/1)	Hokes Bluff (1/2)	Ardmore (1/2)	Hatton (2/3)	Waterloo (1/5)
1994	Walker (1/3)	Smiths Station (1/1)	Brooks (1/1)	New Hope (3/4)	Cordova (1/3)	Waterloo (2/5)
1995	Walker (2/3)	Hazel Green (1/5)	New Hope (4/4)	Cordova (2/3)	Alabama Christian (1/1)	Waterloo (3/5)
1996	Walker (3/3)	Hazel Green (2/5)	Ashford (2/3)	Pleasant Valley (7/9)	Hatton (3/3)	Addison (1/1)
1997	Hazel Green (3/5)	Cullman (2/3)	Ashford (3/3)	Cordova (3/3)	Colbert Heights (1/1)	Waterloo (4/5)
1998	Hazel Green (4/5)	Cullman (3/3)	Hokes Bluff (2/2)	Ardmore (2/2)	Sand Rock (1/1)	Houston Academy (1/3)
1999	Athens (3/3)		Geneva (1/3)	Pleasant Valley (8/9)	Geraldine (1/2)	Houston Academy (2/3)
2000	Hazel Green (5/5)		Geneva (2/3)	Pleasant Valley (9/9)	Geraldine (2/2)	G. W. Long (1/1)
2001	Geneva (3/3)			Munford (1/1)		Waterloo (5/5)
2002	--	Houston Academy (3/3)				

Pleasant Valley holds the all-time record with 9 titles.

Pleasant Valley holds the most consecutive championships with 5 titles (1988–92).

== Swimming & Diving ==
=== Boys ===
Since the tournament’s establishment in 1960, sixty-six tournaments have been held with a total of fourteen champions.

Year	7A	6A	5A	4A	3A	2A	1A
1960	Coffee (1/1)						
1961	Tuscaloosa (1/6)						
1962	Tuscaloosa (2/6)						
1963	Tuscaloosa (3/6)						
1964	Tuscaloosa (4/6)						
1965	Tuscaloosa (5/6)						
1966	Sidney Lanier (1/1)						
1967	Tuscaloosa (6/6)						
1968	Huntsville (1/22)						
1969	W.A. Berry (1/10)						
1970	W.A. Berry (2/10)						
1971	W.A. Berry (3/10)						
1972	W.A. Berry (4/10)						
1973	W.A. Berry (5/10)						
1974	Huntsville (2/22)						
1975	Huntsville (3/22)						
1976	Mountain Brook (1/1)						
1977	Huntsville (4/22)						
1978	Huntsville (5/22)						
1979	Huntsville (6/22)						
1980	Huntsville (7/22)						
1981	Huntsville (8/22)						
1982	Huntsville (9/22)						
1983	Huntsville (10/22)						
1984	Grissom (1/15)						
1985	Grissom (2/15)						
1986	Grissom (3/15)						
1987	Grissom (4/15)						
1988	Grissom (5/15)						
1989	Grissom (6/15)						
1990	Grissom (7/15)						
1991	Grissom (8/15)						
1992	Grissom (9/15)						
1993	Grissom (10/15)						
1994	Grissom (11/15)						
1995	Grissom (12/15)						
1996	Grissom (13/15)						
1997	Hoover (6/10)						
1998	Grissom (14/15)						
1999	Grissom (15/15)						
2000	Hoover (7/10)						
2001	Hoover (8/10)						
2002	Hoover (9/10)						
2003	Hoover (10/10)						
2004	Bob Jones (1/9)						
2005	Bob Jones (2/9)						
2006	Bob Jones (3/9)						
2007	Bob Jones (4/9)						
2008	Bob Jones (5/9)						
2009	Bob Jones (6/9)						
2010	Bob Jones (7/9)						
2011	McGill-Toolen (1/1)						
2012	Huntsville (11/22)						
2013	Huntsville (12/22)						
2014	Bob Jones (8/9)		St. Paul’s (1/4)				
2015	Bob Jones (9/9)		St. Paul’s (2/4)				
2016	Huntsville (13/22)		St. Paul’s (3/4)				
2017	Huntsville (14/22)		St. Paul’s (4/4)				
2018	Huntsville (15/22)		Boaz (1/3) & T.R. Miller (1/3)				
2019	Huntsville (16/22)		T.R. Miller (2/3)				
2020	Huntsville (17/22)		T.R. Miller (3/3)				
2021	Huntsville (18/22)		Randolph (1/2)				
2022	Huntsville (19/22)		Boaz (2/3)				
2023	Huntsville (20/22)		Boaz (3/3)				
2024	Huntsville (21/22)		Scottsboro (1/1)				
2025	Huntsville (22/22)		Randolph (2/2)				

Huntsville holds the all-time record with 22 titles.

Grissom holds the most consecutive championships with 13 titles (1984–96) (Consecutive record for AHSAA boys sports).

=== Girls ===
Since the tournament’s establishment in 1963, sixty-three tournaments have been held with a total of seventeen champions.

Year	7A	6A	5A	4A	3A	2A	1A
1963	Sidney Lanier (1/3)						
1964	Floyd Junior (Montgomery) (1/1)						
1965	Sidney Lanier (2/3)						
1966	Sidney Lanier (3/3)						
1967	Coffee (1/2)						
1968	Coffee (2/2)						
1969	W. A. Berry (1/5)						
1970	W. A. Berry (2/5)						
1971	Huntsville (1/13)						
1972	Huntsville (2/13)						
1973	Huntsville (3/13)						
1974	Huntsville (4/13)						
1975	Huntsville (5/13)						
1976	Huntsville (6/13)						
1977	Grissom (1/18)						
1978	Grissom (2/18)						
1979	Grissom (3/18)						
1980	Huntsville (7/13)						
1981	Huntsville (8/13)						
1982	Huntsville (9/13)						
1983	Huntsville (10/13)						
1984	Grissom (4/18)						
1985	Grissom (5/18)						
1986	Grissom (6/18)						
1987	Grissom (7/18)						
1988	Grissom (8/18)						
1989	Grissom (9/18)						
1990	Grissom (10/18)						
1991	Grissom (11/18)						
1992	Grissom (12/8)						
1993	Grissom (13/18)						
1994	W. A. Berry (3/5)						
1995	Grissom (14/18)						
1996	Grissom (15/18)						
1997	UMS-Wright (1/4)						
1998	Grissom (16/18)						
1999	Grissom (17/18)						
2000	Mountain Brook (1/6)						
2001	Mountain Brook (2/6)						
2002	Mountain Brook (3/6)						
2003	St. Paul's (1/4)						
2004	St. Paul's (2/4)						
2005	Mountain Brook (4/6)						
2006	Mountain Brook (5/6)						
2007	Bob Jones (1/4)						
2008	Grissom (18/18)						
2009	Mountain Brook (6/6)						
2010	Hoover (4/5)						
2011	Hoover (5/5)						
2012	McGill-Toolen (1/1)						
2013	Auburn (1/5)						
2014	Auburn (2/5)		St. Paul’s (3/4)				
2015	Auburn (3/5)		St. Paul’s (4/4)				
2016	Auburn (4/5)		Westminster Christian (1/5)				
2017	Auburn (5/5)		Westminster Christian (2/5)				
2018	Westminster Christian (3/5)		UMS-Wright (2/4)				
2019	Westminster Christian (4/5)		UMS-Wright (3/4)				
2020	Huntsville (11/13)		Bayside Academy (1/1)				
2021	Huntsville (12/13)		Randolph (1/1)				
2022	Bob Jones (2/4)		UMS-Wright (4/4)				
2023	Bob Jones (3/4)		Whitesburg Christian (1/1)				
2024	Bob Jones (4/4)		Westminster Christian (5/5)				
2025	Huntsville (13/13)		Arab (1/1)				

Grissom holds the all-time record with 18 titles.

Grissom holds the most consecutive championships with 10 titles (1984–93).

== Tennis ==
=== Boys ===
Since the tournament’s establishment in 1945, eighty tournaments have been held with a total of forty-seven champions.

Year	7A	6A	5A	4A	3A	2A	1A
1945	--			Woodlawn (1/2)			
1946	--			Woodlawn (2/2)			
1947	--			Phillips (1/1)			
1948	--			Sylacauga (1/10)			
1949	--			Sylacauga (2/10)			
1950	--			Sylacauga (3/10)			
1951	--			Sylacauga (4/10)			
1952	--			Sidney Lanier (1/1)			
1953	--			Anniston (1/6)			
1954	--			Sylacauga (5/10) & Anniston (2/6)^{†}			
1955	--			Sylacauga (6/10)			
1956	--			Bessemer (1/1)			
1957	--			Shades Valley (1/1)			
1958	--			Anniston (3/6)			
1959	--			Anniston (4/6)			
1960	--			Anniston (5/6)			
1961	--			Tuscaloosa (1/6)			
1962	--			Tuscaloosa (2/6)			
1963	--			Tuscaloosa (3/6)			
1964	--			Anniston (6/6)			
1965	--			Huntsville (1/6)			
1966	--			Tuscaloosa (4/6)			
1967	--			Tuscaloosa (5/6)			
1968	--			University Military School (1/16)			
1969	--			Mountain Brook (1/30)			
1970	--			Mountain Brook (2/30)			
1971	--			Mountain Brook (3/30)			
1972	--			Mountain Brook (4/30)			
1973	--			Mountain Brook (5/30)			
1974	--			Tuscaloosa (6/6)			
1975	--			Mountain Brook (6/30)			
1976	--			McGill (1/5)			
1977	--			McGill (2/5)			
1978	--			McGill-Toolen (3/5)	Cullman (1/2)		
1979	--			McGill-Toolen (4/5)	Cullman (2/2)		
1980	--			Huntsville (2/6)	St. Paul's (1/14)		
1981	--			Huntsville (3/6)	UMS Prep (2/14)		
1982	--			Huntsville (4/6)	St. Paul’s (3/14)		
1983	--			Mountain Brook (7/30)	St. Paul’s 4/14)		
1984	--			Huntsville (5/6)	Randolph (1/2)		
1985	--	Mountain Brook (8/30)	Homewood (1/1)				
1986	--	Mountain Brook (9/30)	St. Paul’s (5/14)				
1987	--	Mountain Brook (10/30)	St. Paul's (6/14)				
1988	--	Central-Tuscaloosa (1/1)	Houston Academy (1/6)				
1989	--	Austin (1/1)	UMS-Wright (2/16)				
1990	--	Huntsville (6/6)	UMS-Wright (3/16)				
1991	--	Opelika (1/1)	Athens (1/3)	Jemison (1/3)			
1992	--	Grissom (1/1)	Athens (2/3)	Jemison (2/3)			
1993	--	Mountain Brook (11/30)	Athens (3/3)	Jemison (3/3)			
1994	--	Mountain Brook (12/30)	Sylacauga (7/10)	St. Paul's (7/14)			
1995	--	Vestavia Hills (1/11)	John Carroll (1/1)	St. Paul’s (8/14)			
1996	--	Mountain Brook (13/30)	Sylacauga (8/10)	Jacksonville (1/1)	St. Paul’s (9/14)		
1997	--	Mountain Brook (14/30)	Sylacauga (9/10)	St. Paul’s (10/14)	Montgomery Academy (1/17)		
1998	--	Mountain Brook (15/30)	Sylacauga (10/10)	St. Paul’s (11/14)	Montgomery Academy (2/17)		
1999	--	Hoover (1/3)	Walker (1/10)	Cherokee County (1/1)	Montgomery Academy (3/17)		
2000	--	Mountain Brook (16/30)	Walker (2/10)	St. Paul’s (12/14)	Trinity (1/4)		
2001	--	Hoover (2/3)	Walker (3/10)	UMS-Wright (4/16)	Montgomery Academy (4/17)		
2002	--	Mountain Brook (17/30)	Muscle Shoals (1/4)	UMS-Wright (5/16)	Montgomery Academy (5/17)		
2003	--	Mountain Brook (18/30)	Walker (4/10)	UMS-Wright (6/16)	Montgomery Academy (6/17)		
2004	--	Mountain Brook (19/30)	Bradshaw (1/1)	UMS-Wright (7/16)	Montgomery Academy (7/17)		
2005	--	Mountain Brook (20/30)	Muscle Shoals (2/4)	Trinity (2/4)	Montgomery Academy (8/17)		
2006	--	Hoover (3/3)	Walker (5/10)	UMS-Wright (8/16)	Indian Springs (1/1)		
2007	--	Spain Park (1/2)	Walker (6/10)	Trinity (3/4)	Montgomery Academy (9/17)		
2008	--	Mountain Brook (21/30)	Walker (7/10)	Trinity (4/4)	Randolph (2/2)		
2009	--	Mountain Brook (22/30)	St. Paul's (13/14)	UMS-Wright (9/16)	Bayside Academy (1/1)		
2010	--	Mountain Brook (23/30)	Walker (8/10)	UMS-Wright (10/16)	Altamont (1/2)		
2011	--	Vestavia Hills (2/11)	Muscle Shoals (3/4)	UMS-Wright (11/16)	Montgomery Academy (10/17)		
2012	--	Vestavia Hills (3/11)	Muscle Shoals (4/4)	UMS-Wright (12/16)	Montgomery Academy (11/17)		
2013	--	Vestavia Hills (4/11)	Spanish Fort (1/1)	UMS-Wright (13/16)	Montgomery Academy (12/17)		
2014	--	Vestavia Hills (5/11)	St. Paul's (14/14)	UMS-Wright (14/16)	Montgomery Academy (13/17)		
2015	Mountain Brook (24/30)	Hillcrest-Tuscaloosa (1/1)	UMS-Wright (15/16)		Montgomery Academy (14/17)		
2016	Mountain Brook (25/30)	Walker (9/10)	UMS-Wright (16/16)		Montgomery Academy (15/17)		
2017	Mountain Brook (26/30)	Florence (1/1)	Briarwood Christian (1/4)		Altamont (2/2)		
2018	McGill-Toolen (5/5)	Jasper (10/10)	Briarwood Christian (2/4)		Houston Academy (2/6)		
2019	Vestavia Hills (6/11)	Briarwood Christian (3/4)	Montgomery Academy (16/17)		Houston Academy (3/6)		
2020	No competition due to COVID-19 pandemic						
2021	Spain Park (2/2)	Montgomery Academy (17/17)	Madison Academy (1/2)		Houston Academy (4/6)		
2022	Vestavia Hills (7/11)	Northridge (1/1)	Madison Academy (2/2)		Houston Academy (5/6)		
2023	Vestavia Hills (8/11)	Mountain Brook (27/30)	LAMP (1/2)		St. James (1/1)		
2024	Vestavia Hills (9/11)	Mountain Brook (28/30)	Houston Academy (6/6)		Providence Christian (1/1)		
2025	Vestavia Hills (10/11)	Mountain Brook (29/30)	Briarwood (4/4)		Tuscaloosa Academy*(1/1)		
2026	Vestavia Hills (11/11)	Mountain Brook (30/30)	LAMP (2/2)		Lauderdale County (1/1)		

^{†} Co-Champions

*Playoff Tiebreak

The Mountain Brook Spartans hold the all-time record with 30 titles (All-time record for AHSAA boys sports).

UMS-Wright holds the most consecutive championships with 8 titles (2009–16).

=== Girls ===
Since the tournament’s establishment in 1963, sixty-two tournaments have been held with a total of thirty-three champions.

Year	7A	6A	5A	4A	3A	2A	1A
1963	--			Tuscaloosa (1/3)			
1964	--			Tuscaloosa (2/3)			
1965	--			Murphy (1/3)			
1966	--			Murphy (2/3)			
1967	--			Murphy (3/3)			
1968	--			Ramsay (1/2)			
1969	--			Ramsay (2/2)			
1970	--			Tuscaloosa (3/3)			
1971	--			Montgomery Academy (1/18)			
1972	--			Mountain Brook (1/35)			
1973	--			Mountain Brook (2/35)			
1974	--			Mountain Brook (3/35)			
1975	--			Mountain Brook (4/35)			
1976	--			Mountain Brook (5/35)			
1977	--			Mountain Brook (6/35)			
1978	--			Huntsville (1/6)	J. T. Wright (1/1)		
1979	--			Mountain Brook (7/35)	Donoho (1/3)		
1980	--			Mountain Brook (8/35)	Donoho (2/3)		
1981	--			Mountain Brook (9/35)	Donoho (3/3)		
1982	--			Huntsville (2/6)	Bayside Academy (1/6)		
1983	--			Mountain Brook (10/35)	Bayside Academy (2/6)		
1984	--			Huntsville (3/6)	Bayside Academy (3/6)		
1985	--	Mountain Brook (11/35)	St. Paul's (1/19)				
1986	--	Mountain Brook (12/35)	St. Paul's (2/19)				
1987	--	Mountain Brook (13/35)	St. Paul's (3/19)				
1988	--	Mountain Brook (14/35)	Houston Academy (1/8)				
1989	--	Vestavia Hills (1/15)	Houston Academy (2/8)				
1990	--	Huntsville (4/6)	St. Paul's (4/19)				
1991	--	Vestavia Hills (2/15)	Erwin (1/1)	Houston Academy (3/8)			
1992	--	Vestavia Hills (3/15)	Andalusia (1/5)	Houston Academy (4/8)			
1993	--	Vestavia Hills (4/15)	Andalusia (2/5)	St. Paul's (5/19)			
1994	--	Jeff Davis (1/1)	Andalusia (3/5)	UMS-Wright (1/17)			
1995	--	Mountain Brook (15/35)	Andalusia (4/5)	Trinity Presbyterian (1/6)			
1996	--	Grissom (1/1)	Andalusia (5/5)	Jemison (1/1)	Trinity Presbyterian (2/6)		
1997	--	Mountain Brook (16/35)	Muscle Shoals (1/3)	St. Paul's (6/19)	Montgomery Academy (2/18)		
1998	--	Vestavia Hills (5/15)	Cullman (1/2)	St. Paul's (7/19)	Montgomery Academy (3/18)		
1999	--	Vestavia Hills (6/15)	Muscle Shoals (2/3)	St. Paul's (8/19)	Montgomery Academy (4/18)		
2000	--	Mountain Brook (17/35)	John Carroll (1/1)	St. Paul's (9/19)	Montgomery Academy (5/18)		
2001	--	Mountain Brook (18/35)	Briarwood (1/3)	Trinity Presbyterian (3/6)	Montgomery Academy (6/18)		
2002	--	Mountain Brook (19/35)	St. Paul's (10/19)	Trinity Presbyterian (4/6)	Montgomery Academy (7/18)		
2003	--	Mountain Brook (20/35)	Walker (1/2)	St. James (1/3)	Houston Academy (5/8)		
2004	--	Mountain Brook (21/35)	St. Paul's (11/19)	UMS-Wright (2/17)	Montgomery Academy (8/18)		
2005	--	Mountain Brook (22/35)	St. Paul's (12/19)	UMS-Wright (3/17)	Houston Academy (6/8)		
2006	--	Mountain Brook (23/35)	St. Paul's (13/19)	UMS-Wright (4/17)	Houston Academy (7/8)		
2007	--	Vestavia Hills (7/15)	St. Paul's (14/19)	Trinity Presbyterian (5/6)	Bayside Academy (4/6)		
2008	--	Vestavia Hills (8/15)	St. Paul's (15/19)	Trinity Presbyterian (6/6)	Montgomery Academy (9/18)		
2009	--	Vestavia Hills (9/15)	St. Paul's (16/19)	UMS-Wright (5/17)	Montgomery Academy (10/18)		
2010	--	Vestavia Hills (10/15)	St. Paul's (17/19)	UMS-Wright (6/17)	Montgomery Academy (11/18)		
2011	--	Mountain Brook (24/35)	Muscle Shoals (3/3) & Cullman (2/2)^{†}	UMS-Wright (7/17)	Montgomery Academy (12/18)		
2012	--	Mountain Brook (25/35)	St. Paul's (18/19)	UMS-Wright (8/17)	Montgomery Academy (13/18)		
2013	--	Vestavia Hills (11/15)	Briarwood Christian (2/3)	UMS-Wright (9/17)	Montgomery Academy (14/18)		
2014	--	Mountain Brook (26/35)	St. Paul's (19/19)	UMS-Wright (10/17)	Houston Academy (8/8)		
2015	Huntsville (5/6)	Walker (2/2)	UMS-Wright (11/17)		Montgomery Academy (15/18)		
2016	Vestavia Hills (12/15)	Briarwood Christian (3/3)	UMS-Wright (12/17)		Montgomery Academy (16/18)		
2017	Mountain Brook (27/35)	Decatur (1/1)	UMS-Wright (13/17)		Montgomery Academy (17/18)		
2018	Mountain Brook (28/35)	Northridge (1/1)	UMS-Wright (14/17)		Bayside Academy (5/6)		
2019	Mountain Brook (29/35)	UMS-Wright (15/17)	Montgomery Academy (18/18)		St. James (2/3)		
2020	No competition due to COVID-19 pandemic						
2021	Auburn (1/2)	Mountain Brook (30/35)	St. John Paul ll (1/1)		St. Luke’s Episcopal (1/1)		
2022	Vestavia Hills (13/15)	Mountain Brook (31/35)	Randolph (1/1)		Bayside Academy (6/6)		
2023	Auburn (2/2)	Mountain Brook (32/35)	UMS-Wright (16/17)		Lauderdale County (1/3)		
2024	Vestavia Hills (14/15)	Mountain Brook (33/35)	UMS-Wright (17/17)		Lauderdale County (2/3)		
2025	Vestavia Hills (15/15)	Mountain Brook (34/35)	Sardis (1/1)		Lauderdale County (3/3)		
2026	Huntsville (6/6)	Mountain Brook (35/35)	St. James (3/3)		Shoals Christian (1/1)		

^{†} Co-Champions

The Mountain Brook Spartans hold the all-time record with 35 titles (All-time record for AHSAA girls sports).

UMS-Wright holds the most consecutive championships with 11 titles (2009–19).

== Track and Field ==
=== Boys ===
Since the tournament’s establishment in 1925, 100 tournaments have been held with a total of 107 champions.

Year	7A	6A	5A	4A	3A	2A	1A
1965	--			Sidney Lanier (6/7)	Auburn (1/9)	Birmingham University School (1/4)	
1966	--			Shades Valley (1/1)	Auburn (2/9)	Birmingham University School (2/4)	
1967	--			Sidney Lanier (7/7)	Auburn (3/9)	Birmingham University School (3/4)	
1968	--			Lee-Montgomery (2/7)	Auburn (4/9)	Birmingham University School (4/4)	
1969	--			Carver-Birmingham (1/1)	Auburn (5/9)	East Highland (1/2)	
1970	--			Lee-Montgomery (3/7)	Auburn (6/9)	East Highland (2/2)	
1971	--			Lee-Montgomery (4/7)	Auburn (7/9)	Ashville (1/3)	
1972	--			Murphy (6/10)	Cobb Avenue (1/1)	Ashville (2/3)	
1973	--			Jeff Davis (1/3)	Athens (1/4)	Ashville (3/3)	
1974	--			Murphy (7/10)	John Carroll (1/1)	Cherokee Vocational (1/2)	
1975	--			Parker (1/1)	Athens (2/4)	Calhoun (1/5)	
1976	--			Davidson (1/7)	Athens (3/4)	Clements (1/1)	
1977	--			Jeff Davis (2/3)	Athens (4/4)	Elmore County (1/2)	
1978	--			Lee-Montgomery (5/7)	Cherokee County (1/1)	D. C. Wolfe (1/1)	
1979	--			Lee-Montgomery (6/7)	Gardendale (1/3)	Calhoun (2/5)	Coffeeville (1/6)
1980	--			Lee-Montgomery (7/7)	McAdory (2/2)	Calhoun (3/5)	Coffeeville (2/6)
1981	--			Davidson (2/7)	UMS Prep (1/24)	Calhoun (4/5)	Coffeeville (3/6)
1982	--			Davidson (3/7)	UMS Prep (2/24)	Calhoun (5/5)	Coffeeville (4/6)
1983	--			Central-Tuscaloosa (1/4)	UMS Prep (3/24)	St. Paul's (1/17)	Coffeeville (5/6)
1984	--			Davidson (4/7)	Gardendale (2/3)	St. Paul's (2/17)	Coffeeville (6/6)
1985	--	Davidson (5/7)	Mobile County (1/1)	St. Paul's (3/17)		Hazlewood (2/16)	
1986	--	Davidson (6/7)	Monroe County (1/1)	Vincent (1/3)		Hazlewood (3/16)	
1987	--	Davidson (7/7)	Williamson (1/6)	Geneva (1/3)		Randolph (1/1)	
1988	--	Murphy (8/10)	Williamson (2/6)	Geneva (2/3)		J. F. Shields (1/1)	
1989	--	Gardendale (3/3)	Blount (1/8)	Geneva (3/3)	Cherokee Vocational (2/2) & St. Paul's (4/17)^{†}	Hazlewood (4/16)	Billingsley (1/1)
1990	--	Murphy (9/10)	Blount (2/8)	UMS-Wright (4/24)	Elmore County (2/2)	Hazlewood (5/16)	Courtland (1/7)
1991	--	Murphy (10/10)	Blount (3/8)	T. R. Miller (1/8)	UMS-Wright (5/24)	Hazlewood (6/16)	Courtland (2/7)
1992	--	Theodore (1/1)	Blount (4/8)	T. R. Miller (2/8)	St. Paul's (5/17)	Hazlewood (7/16)	Alabama School for Deaf (1/3)
1993	--	Central-Phenix City (1/1)	Williamson (3/6)	Leeds (1/8)	St. Paul's (6/17)	Hazlewood (8/16)	Montgomery County (1/1)
1994	--	Jeff Davis (3/3)	Smiths Station (1/1)	Leeds (2/8)	St. Paul's (7/17)	Hazlewood (9/16)	Courtland (3/7)
1995	--	Central-Tuscaloosa (2/4)	Williamson (4/6)	Leeds (3/8)	St. Paul's (8/17)	Oneonta (1/1)	Courtland (4/7)
1996	--	Central-Tuscaloosa (3/4)	Williamson (5/6)	Leeds (4/8)	St. Paul's (9/17)	Hazlewood (10/16)	Courtland (5/7)
1997	--	Central-Tuscaloosa (4/4)	Blount (5/8)	Madison County (1/2)	UMS-Wright (6/24)	Rogers (1/1)	St. Jude (1/4)
1998	--	Opelika (1/11)	Blount (6/8)	Leeds (5/8)	UMS-Wright (7/24)	Hazlewood (11/16)	St. Jude (2/4)
1999	--	Opelika (2/11)	Blount (7/8)	Madison County (2/2)	UMS-Wright (8/24)	Hazlewood (12/16)	St. Jude (3/4)
2000	--	Opelika (3/11)	Blount (8/8)	Leeds (6/8)	UMS-Wright (9/24)	Hazlewood (13/16)	Courtland (6/7)
2001	--	Grissom (1/1)	Williamson (6/6)	Leeds (7/8)	Lincoln (1/2)	St. Jude (4/4)	Hazlewood (14/16)
2002	--	Tuscaloosa County (1/1)	Scottsboro (1/11)	UMS-Wright (10/24)	Sheffield (1/1)	Vincent (2/3)	Hazlewood (15/16)
2003	--	Opelika (4/11)	Scottsboro (2/11)	UMS-Wright (11/24)	T. R. Miller (3/8)	Vincent (3/3)	Hazlewood (16/16)
2004	--	Opelika (5/11)	Scottsboro (3/11)	UMS-Wright (12/24)	T. R. Miller (4/8)	Randolph County (1/1)	Courtland (7/7)
2005	--	Hoover (1/14)	Scottsboro (4/11)	UMS-Wright (13/24)	Leeds (8/8)	Altamont (1/3)	Alabama School for Deaf (2/3)
2006	--	Opelika (6/11)	St. Paul's (10/17)	UMS-Wright (14/24)	T. R. Miller (5/8)	Altamont (2/3)	Alabama School for Deaf (3/3)
2007	--	Opelika (7/11)	St. Paul's (11/17)	Jacksonville (1/1)	Mobile Christian (1/3)	Falkville (1/7)	Cedar Bluff (1/6)
2008	--	Vestavia Hills (1/3)	St. Paul's (12/17)	Beauregard (1/2)	Lincoln (2/2)	Falkville (2/7)	Cedar Bluff (2/6)
2009	--	Hoover (2/14)	Spanish Fort (1/2)	UMS-Wright (15/24)	T. R. Miller (6/8)	Mobile Christian (2/3)	Cedar Bluff (3/6)
2010	--	Hoover (3/14)	Spanish Fort (2/2) & St. Paul's (13/17)^{†}	UMS-Wright (16/24)	T. R. Miller (7/8)	Lanett (1/2)	Cedar Bluff (4/6)
2011	--	Hoover (4/14)	St. Paul's (14/17)	UMS-Wright (17/24)	Greensboro (1/4)	Lanett (2/2)	Cedar Bluff (5/6)
2012	--	Hoover (5/14)	St. Paul's (15/17)	UMS-Wright (18/24)	Greensboro (2/4)	Tanner (1/1)	Cedar Bluff (6/6)
2013	--	Auburn (8/9)	Paul W. Bryant (1/1)	UMS-Wright (19/24)	Piedmont (1/2)	LaFayette (1/2)	Falkville (3/7)
2014	--	Hoover (6/14)	Homewood (1/6)	UMS-Wright (20/24)	Piedmont (2/2)	Mobile Christian (3/3)	Falkville (4/7)
2015	Hoover (7/14)	Opelika (8/11)	St. Paul's (16/17)	UMS-Wright (21/24)	Winfield (1/4)	Falkville (5/7)	Marion County (1/1)
2016	Auburn (9/9)	Opelika (9/11)	St. Paul's (17/17)	UMS-Wright (22/24)	Winfield (2/4)	Cold Springs (1/4)	St. Bernard (1/1)
2017	Hoover (8/14)	Opelika (10/11)	Scottsboro (5/11)	Greensboro (3/4)	American Christian (1/2)	Cold Springs (2/4)	Westminster-Oak Mountain (1/3)
2018	Hoover (9/14)	Homewood (2/6)	Beauregard (2/2)	Winfield (3/4)	American Christian (2/2)	Falkville (6/7)	Westminster-Oak Mountain (2/3)
2019	Hoover (10/14)	Homewood (3/6)	Scottsboro (6/11)	Greensboro (4/4)	Winfield (4/4)	Altamont (3/3)	Falkville (7/7)
2020	No competition due to COVID-19 pandemic						
2021	Vestavia Hills (2/3)	Opelika (11/11)	UMS-Wright (23/24)	Bibb County (1/1)	Montgomery Catholic (1/1)	Westminster Oak-Mountain (3/3)	Linden (1/1)
2022	Hoover (11/14)	Scottsboro (7/11)	UMS-Wright (24/24)	Anniston (1/4)	Bayside Academy (1/1)	LaFayette (2/2)	Lindsay Lane Christian (1/1)
2023	Hoover (12/14)	Homewood (4/6)	Scottsboro (8/11)	Anniston (2/4)	Madison Academy (1/2)	Cold Springs (3/4)	Loachapoka (1/2)
2024	Hoover (13/14)	Northridge (1/1)	Scottsboro (9/11)	Hamilton (1/1)	Madison Academy (2/2)	Cold Springs (4/4)	Winterboro (1/3)
2025	Vestavia Hills (3/3)	Homewood (5/6)	Scottsboro (10/11)	Anniston (3/4)	Weaver (1/1)	Loachapoka (2/2)	Winterboro (2/3)
2026	Hoover (14/14)	Homewood (6/6)	Scottsboro (11/11)	Anniston (4/4)	T.R. Miller (8/8)	Abbeville (1/1) & Holy Spirit Catholic (1/1)^{†}	Winterboro (3/3)

^{†}Co-Champions

UMS-Wright holds the all-time record with 24 titles.

UMS-Wright holds the most consecutive championships with 7 titles (2009–15) (Tie).

Auburn holds the most consecutive championships with 7 titles. (1965–71) (Tie).

Year	AA	A
1925	Snead Seminary (1/2) & Bessemer (1/5)^{†}	
1926	Snead Seminary (2/2)	
1927	Bessemer (2/5) & Phillips (1/6)^{†}	
1928	Bessemer (3/5)	
1929	Phillips (2/6)	
1930	Phillips (3/6)	
1931	Ensley (1/1)	
1932	Woodlawn (1/4)	
1933	Tuscaloosa (1/3)	
1934	West End (1/4)	
1935	West End (2/4)	
1936	West End (3/4)	
1937	Ramsay (1/8)	
1938	Ramsay (2/8)	
1939	Ramsay (3/8)	
1940	Ramsay (4/8)	
1941	Ramsay (5/8)	
1942	Phillips (4/6)	
1943	Phillips (5/6)	
1944	Woodlawn (2/4)	
1945	Woodlawn (3/4)	
1946	Woodlawn (4/4)	
1947	West End (4/4)	
1948	Sidney Lanier (1/7) & Phillips (6/6)	
1949	Ramsay (6/8) & Bessemer (4/5)	
1950	Sidney Lanier (2/7) & Bessemer (5/5)	
1951	Ramsay (7/8)	
1952	Ramsay (8/8)	Andalusia (1/3)
1953	Dothan (1/1)	Hazlewood (1/16)
1954	Sidney Lanier (3/7)	Andalusia (2/3) & McAdory (1/2)^{†}
1955	Tuscaloosa (2/3)	Andalusia (3/3)
1956	Sidney Lanier (4/7)	Fairfield (1/1)
1957	Tuscaloosa (3/3)	Enterprise (1/1)
1958	Gadsden (1/1) & Murphy (1/10)^{†}	Russellville (1/1)
1959	Murphy (2/10)	Tallassee (1/1)
1960	Murphy (3/10)	Sylacauga (1/3)
1961	Lee-Montgomery (1/7)	Sylacauga (2/3)
1962	Murphy (4/10)	Deshler (1/2)
1963	Murphy (5/10)	Sylacauga (3/3)
1964	Sidney Lanier (5/7)	Deshler (2/2)

^{†} Co-Champions

=== Girls ===
Since the tournament’s establishment in 1972, fifty-three tournaments have been held with a total of seventy-six champions.

Year	7A	6A	5A	4A	3A	2A	1A
1972	--			Clements (1/1)			
1973	--			Athens (1/3)			
1974	--			Hayes (1/2)			
1975	--			Hayes (2/2)			
1976	--			Mountain Brook (1/15)		St. Paul's (1/25)	
1977	--			Mountain Brook (2/15)	Athens (2/3)	St. Paul's (2/25)	
1978	--			Bradshaw (1/2)	Athens (3/3)	Lauderdale County (1/1)	
1979	--			Bradshaw (2/2)	Clarke County (1/9)	Calhoun (1/4)	Randolph (1/11)
1980	--			McGill-Toolen (1/1)	Clarke County (2/9)	Calhoun (2/4)	Randolph (2/11)
1981	--			Lee-Montgomery (1/1)	Weaver (1/1)	Calhoun (3/4)	Randolph (3/11)
1982	--			Murphy (1/3)	J. T. Wright (1/2)	Calhoun (4/4)	Alabama School for the Deaf (1/2)
1983	--			Murphy (2/3)	J. T. Wright (2/2)	Vincent (1/2)	Coffeeville (1/1)
1984	--			Mountain Brook (3/15)	Clarke County (3/9)	Vincent (2/2)	Alabama School for the Deaf (2/2)
1985	--	Murphy (3/3)	Cullman (1/2)	St. Paul's (3/25)		J. F. Shields (1/2)	
1986	--	Auburn (1/2)	Mobile County (1/4)	Clarke County (4/9)		Randolph (4/11)	
1987	--	Davidson (1/2)	Mobile County (2/4)	Clarke County (5/9)		Randolph (5/11)	
1988	--	Davidson (2/2)	Mobile County (3/4)	Clarke County (6/9)		J. F. Shields (2/2)	
1989	--	Jackson-Olin (1/1)	Mobile County (4/4)	Clarke County (7/9)	St. Paul's (4/25)	Randolph (6/11)	Ragland (1/1)
1990	--	Huntsville (1/1)	Williamson (1/7)	Clarke County (8/9)	St. Paul's (5/25)	Randolph (7/11)	Courtland (1/5)
1991	--	Mountain Brook (4/15)	Williamson (2/7)	Clarke County (9/9) & Lincoln (1/1)^{†}	St. Paul's (6/25)	Randolph (8/11)	Courtland (2/5)
1992	--	Mountain Brook (5/15)	Williamson (3/7)	Cherokee County (1/1)	St. Paul's (7/25)	Randolph (9/11)	Courtland (3/5)
1993	--	Mountain Brook (6/15)	Williamson (4/7)	Carver-Birmingham (1/1)	St. Paul's (8/25)	Hazlewood (1/13)	Bayside Academy (1/6)
1994	--	Vigor (1/1)	Cullman (2/2)	Jacksonville (1/1)	St. Paul's (9/25)	Hazlewood (2/13)	Randolph (10/11)
1995	--	Mountain Brook (7/15)	Fort Payne (1/1)	Greensboro (1/1)	St. Paul's (10/25)	Hazlewood (3/13)	Bayside Academy (2/6)
1996	--	J. O. Johnson (1/1)	Williamson (5/7)	Chelsea (1/2)	St. Paul's (11/25)	Hazlewood (4/13)	Mars Hill (1/2)
1997	--	Grissom (1/1)	Scottsboro (1/9)	St. Paul's (12/25)	Briarwood (1/3)	Hazlewood (5/13)	Courtland (4/5)
1998	--	Pelham (1/1)	Williamson (6/7)	Madison County (1/1)	Briarwood (2/3)	Hazlewood (6/13)	Courtland (5/5)
1999	--	Hewitt-Trussville (1/1)	Williamson (7/7)	St. Paul's (13/25)	Briarwood (3/3)	Mars Hill (2/2)	St. Jude (1/1)
2000	--	Central-Tuscaloosa (1/4)	Scottsboro (2/9)	St. Paul's (14/25)	UMS-Wright (1/17)	Hazlewood (7/13)	Cedar Bluff (1/7)
2001	--	Central-Tuscaloosa (2/4)	St. Paul's (15/25)	UMS-Wright (2/17)	Falkville (1/2)	Red Bay (1/1)	Hazlewood (8/13)
2002	--	Central-Tuscaloosa (3/4)	Scottsboro (3/9)	UMS-Wright (3/17)	Sheffield (1/1)	Altamont (1/14)	Hazlewood (9/13)
2003	--	Central-Tuscaloosa (4/4)	Scottsboro (4/9)	UMS-Wright (4/17)	Leeds (1/3)	Altamont (2/14)	Hazlewood (10/13)
2004	--	Hoover (1/15)	Northridge (1/3)	UMS-Wright (5/17)	Leeds (2/3)	Altamont (3/14)	Hazlewood (11/13)
2005	--	Smiths Station (1/1)	Northridge (2/3)	UMS-Wright (6/17)	Leeds (3/3)	Altamont (4/14)	Hazlewood (12/13)
2006	--	Hoover (2/15)	St. Paul's (16/25)	UMS-Wright (7/17)	Montgomery Academy (1/3)	Altamont (5/14)	Hazlewood (13/13)
2007	--	Mountain Brook (8/15)	St. Paul's (17/25)	Guntersville (1/2)	Altamont (6/14)	American Christian (1/9)	Cedar Bluff (2/7)
2008	--	Mountain Brook (9/15)	St. Paul's (18/25)	Guntersville (2/2)	Altamont (7/14)	American Christian (2/9)	Cedar Bluff (3/7)
2009	--	Mountain Brook (10/15)	St. Paul's (19/25)	UMS-Wright (8/17)	Altamont (8/14)	American Christian (3/9)	Cedar Bluff (4/7)
2010	--	Hoover (3/15)	St. Paul's (20/25)	UMS-Wright (9/17)	T.R. Miller (1/4)	American Christian (4/9)	Cedar Bluff (5/7)
2011	--	Mountain Brook (11/15)	St. Paul's (21/25)	UMS-Wright (10/17)	T.R. Miller (2/4)	American Christian (5/9)	Cedar Bluff (6/7)
2012	--	Hoover (4/15)	St. Paul's (22/25)	UMS-Wright (11/17)	Bayside Academy (3/6)	American Christian (6/9)	Cedar Bluff (7/7)
2013	--	Hoover (5/15)	St. Paul's (23/25)	UMS-Wright (12/17)	Bayside Academy (4/6)	Montgomery Academy (2/3)	Westminster-Oak Mountain (1/4)
2014	--	Hoover (6/15)	Homewood (1/6)	Beauregard (1/3)	T. R. Miller (3/4)	Montgomery Academy (3/3)	Westminster-Oak Mountain (2/4)
2015	Hoover (7/15)	Homewood (2/6)	Beauregard (2/3)	UMS-Wright (13/17)	American Christian (7/9)	Altamont (9/14)	Whitesburg Christian (1/7)
2016	Hoover (8/15)	Homewood (3/6)	St. Paul's (24/25)	UMS-Wright (14/17)	T. R. Miller (4/4)	LaFayette (1/1)	Whitesburg Christian (2/7)
2017	Hoover (9/15)	Homewood (4/6)	Beauregard (3/3)	Catholic-Montgomery (1/2)	American Christian (8/9)	Altamont (10/14)	Whitesburg Christian (3/7)
2018	Hoover (10/15)	Homewood (5/6)	St. Paul's (25/25)	UMS-Wright (15/17)	American Christian (9/9)	Altamont (11/14)	Whitesburg Christian (4/7)
2019	James Clemens (1/1)	Homewood (6/6)	Scottsboro (5/9)	Catholic-Montgomery (2/2)	St James (1/1)	Westminster-Oak Mountain (3/4)	Falkville (2/2)
2020	No competition due to COVID-19 pandemic						
2021	Hoover (11/15)	Northridge (3/3)	UMS-Wright (16/17)	Brooks (1/3)	Providence Christian (1/1)	Altamont (12/14)	Marion County (1/3)
2022	Hoover (12/15)	Mountain Brook (12/15)	UMS-Wright (17/17)	Brooks (2/3)	Bayside Academy (5/6)	Westminster Oak-Christian (4/4)	Holy Spirit Catholic (1/1)
2023	Hoover (13/15)	Mountain Brook (13/15)	Scottsboro (6/9)	Brooks (3/3)	Altamont (13/14)	Cold Springs (1/3)	Marion County (2/3)
2024	Hoover (14/15)	Mountain Brook (14/15)	Scottsboro (7/9)	Bayside Academy (6/6)	Altamont (14/14)	Whitesburg Christian (5/7)	Marion County (3/3)
2025	Hoover (15/15)	Chelsea (2/2)	Scottsboro (8/9)	Randolph (11/11)	Whitesburg Christian (6/7)	Cold Springs (2/3)	Winterboro (1/2)
2026	Auburn (2/2)	Mountain Brook (15/15)	Scottsboro (9/9)	Hamilton (1/1)	Whitesburg Christian (7/7)	Cold Springs (3/3)	Winterboro (2/2)

^{†} Co-Champions

St. Paul’s Episcopal holds the all-time record with 25 titles.

St. Paul’s Episcopal holds the most consecutive championships with 9 titles (1989–97).

== Volleyball ==
Since the tournament’s establishment in 1971, fifty-six tournaments have been held with a total of seventy-eight champions.

Year	7A	6A	5A	4A	3A	2A	1A	
1971	--			Bradshaw (1/7)				
1972	--			Bradshaw (2/7)				
1973	--			Bradshaw (3/7)				
1974	--			McGill-Toolen (1/26)				
1975	--			Bradshaw (4/7)			Lamar County (1/1)	
1976	--			Bradshaw (5/7)			St. Paul's (1/16)	
1977	--			McGill-Toolen (2/26)	Lawrence County (1/5)	Lexington (1/7)	Clio (1/2)	
1978	--			McGill-Toolen (3/26)	Russellville (1/1)	Montevallo (1/1)	Clio (2/2)	
1979	--			Bradshaw (6/7)	Thompson (1/3)	Lexington (2/7)	Donoho (1/13)	
1980	--			McGill-Toolen (4/26)	Hazel Green (1/7)	St. Paul's (2/16)	Donoho (2/13)	
1981	--			McGill-Toolen (5/26)	Thompson (2/3)	St. Paul's (3/16)	Bayside Academy (1/31)	
1982	--			Bradshaw (7/7)	Thompson (3/3)	Randolph County (1/1)	Bayside Academy (2/31)	
1983	--			McGill-Toolen (6/26)	Hazel Green (2/7)	Lexington (3/7)	Randolph (1/3)	
1984	--	McGill-Toolen (7/26)	Walter Wellborn (1/1)	Hazel Green (3/7)	St. Paul's (4/16)	Pleasant Valley (1/8)	Bayside Academy (3/31)	
1985	--	McGill-Toolen (8/26)	Ramsay (1/5)	Hazel Green (4/7)	St. Paul's (5/16)	West End (1/5)	Randolph (2/3)	
1986	--	McGill-Toolen (9/26)	Ramsay (2/5)	Hazel Green (5/7)	St. Paul's (6/16)	West End (2/5)	Montgomery Academy (1/9)	
1987	--	McGill-Toolen (10/26)	Ramsay (3/5)	Haleyville (1/4)	Pleasant Valley (2/8)	West End (3/5)	Donoho (3/13)	
1988	--	Grissom (1/6)	Ramsay (4/5)	Carbon Hill (1/3)	Pleasant Valley (3/8)	West End (4/5)	Donoho (4/13)	
1989	--	Grissom (2/6)	Holt (1/1)	Carbon Hill (2/3)	Lexington (4/7)	West End (5/5)	Athens Bible (1/3)	
1990	--	McGill-Toolen (11/26)	Ramsay (5/5)	Carbon Hill (3/3)	Lexington (5/7)	Hatton (1/4)	Donoho (5/13)	
1991	--	Grissom (3/6)	Homewood (1/2)	Haleyville (2/4)	Briarwood (1/7)	Hatton (2/4)	Courtland (1/1)	
1992	--	Grissom (4/6)	Homewood (2/2)	Haleyville (3/4)	St. Paul's (7/16)	Hatton (3/4)	Bayside Academy (4/31)	
1993	--	Pelham (1/3)	Daphne (1/1)	Alexandria (1/3)	Briarwood (2/7)	Hatton (4/4)	Bayside Academy (5/31)	
1994	--	Huntsville (1/11)	Hazel Green (6/7)	Alexandria (2/3)	Briarwood (3/7)	Trinity Presbyterian (1/3)	Donoho (6/13)	
1995	--	McGill-Toolen (12/26)	Saks (1/3)	Alexandria (3/4)	St. Paul's (8/16)	Springville (1/1)	Bayside Academy (6/31)	
1996	--	McGill-Toolen (13/26)	John Carroll (1/3)	Lawrence County (2/5)	Briarwood (4/7)	Pleasant Valley (4/8)	Bayside Academy (7/31)	
1997	--	Pelham (2/3)	John Carroll (2/3)	Lawrence County (3/5)	Briarwood (5/7)	Pleasant Valley (5/8)	Kinston (1/2)	
1998	--	Grissom (5/6)	Muscle Shoals (1/4)	Lawrence County (4/5)	Briarwood (6/7)	Bayside Academy (8/31)	Donoho (7/13)	
1999	--	McGill-Toolen (14/26)	Muscle Shoals (2/4)	Lawrence County (5/5)	Briarwood (7/7)	Bayside Academy (9/31)	Holy Spirit (1/2)	
2000	--	McGill-Toolen (15/26)	Muscle Shoals (3/4)	Haleyville (4/4)	Sylvania (1/1)	Bayside Academy (10/31)	Holy Spirit (2/2)	
2001	--	McGill-Toolen (16/26)	Muscle Shoals (4/4)	St. James (1/3)	Winston County (1/1)	Geraldine (1/1)	Phillips (1/1)	
2002	--	McGill-Toolen (17/26)	Huntsville (2/11)	Saks (2/3)	Alabama Christian (1/2)	Bayside Academy (11/31)	Donoho (8/13)	
2003	--	Grissom (6/6)	Huntsville (3/11)	St. James (2/3)	Alabama Christian (2/2)	Bayside Academy (12/31)	Addison (1/16)	
2004	--	McGill-Toolen (18/26)	Huntsville (4/11)	Guntersville (1/7)	Madison Academy (1/2)	Bayside Academy (13/31)	Addison (2/16)	
2005	--	McGill-Toolen (19/26)	Huntsville (5/11)	Guntersville (2/7)	Montgomery Academy (2/9)	Bayside Academy (14/31)	Addison (3/16)	
2006	--	Huntsville (6/11)	St. Paul's (9/16)	Saks (3/3)	Montgomery Academy (3/9)	Bayside Academy (15/31)	Kinston (2/2)	
2007	--	Huntsville (7/11)	St. Paul's (10/16)	Jacksonville (1/3)	Lexington (6/7)	Bayside Academy (16/31)	Spring Garden (1/3)	
2008	--	Bob Jones (1/3)	St. Paul's (11/16)	Jacksonville (2/3)	Bayside Academy (17/31)	Lexington (7/7)	Gaston (1/1)	
2009	--	Huntsville (8/11)	Faith Academy (1/1)	Guntersville (3/7)	Bayside Academy (18/31)	Addison (4/16)	Athens Bible (2/3)	
2010	--	Huntsville (9/11)	St. Paul's (12/16)	Guntersville (4/7)	Bayside Academy (19/31)	Cottage Hill (1/1)	Addison (5/16)	
2011	--	Huntsville (10/11)	St. Paul's (13/16)	Guntersville (5/7)	Bayside Academy (20/31)	Providence Christian (1/2)	Donoho (9/13)	
2012	--	Huntsville (11/11)	Hartselle (1/1)	Madison County (1/1)	Bayside Academy (21/31)	Providence Christian (2/2)	Donoho (10/13)	
2013	--	Bob Jones (2/3)	St. Paul's (14/16)	Jacksonville (3/3)	Bayside Academy (22/31)	Montgomery Academy (4/9)	Addison (6/16)	
2014	Mountain Brook (1/7)	John Carroll (3/3)	St. Paul's (15/16)	Danville (1/1)	Bayside Academy (23/31)	Addison (7/16)	Athens Bible (3/3)	
2015	Mountain Brook (2/7)	Spanish Fort (1/6)	Randolph (3/3)	Brooks (1/1)	Bayside Academy (24/31)	Addison (8/16)	Meek (1/1)	
2016	Mountain Brook (3/7)	Hazel Green (7/7)	St. Paul's (16/16)	Madison Academy (2/2)	Bayside Academy (25/31)	St. Luke's (1/2)	Addison (9/16)	
2017	McGill-Toolen (20/26)	Pelham (3/3)	Alexandria (4/4)	Saint James (3/3)	Bayside Academy (26/31)	St. Luke's (2/2)	Addison (10/16)	
2018	McGill-Toolen (21/26)	Spanish Fort (2/6)	Jasper (1/2)	Bayside Academy (27/31)	Montgomery Academy (5/9)	Addison (11/16)	Pleasant Home (1/1)	
2019	Mountain Brook (4/7)	Spanish Fort (3/6)	Jasper (2/2)	Bayside Academy (28/31)	Montgomery Academy (6/9)	G.W. Long (1/2)	Donoho (11/13)	
2020	Hoover (1/1)	Mountain Brook (5/7)	Bayside Academy (29/31)	Montgomery Academy (7/9)	Trinity Presbyterian (2/3)	Addison (12/16)	Bayshore Christian (1/1)	
2021	Spain Park (1/1)	Mountain Brook (6/7)	Bayside Academy (30/31)	Westminster Christian (1/2)	Trinity Presbyterian (3/3)	Addison (13/16)	Donoho (12/13)	
2022	McGill-Toolen (22/26)	Bayside Academy (31/31)	Westminster Christian (2/2)	Montgomery Catholic (1/2)	Prattville Christian (1/2)	Donoho (13/13)	Addison (14/16)	
2023	McGill-Toolen (23/26)	Mountain Brook (7/7)	Montgomery Academy (8/9)	Montgomery Catholic (2/2)	Plainview (1/1)	Pleasant Valley (6/8)	Spring Garden (2/3)	
2024	McGill-Toolen (24/26)	Spanish Fort (4/6)	UMS-Wright (1/1)	Prattville Christian (2/2)	Mobile Christian (1/2)	Pleasant Valley (7/8)	Spring Garden (3/3)	
2025	McGill-Toolen (25/26)	Spanish Fort (5/6)	Guntersville (6/7)	Cherokee County (1/1)	Mobile Christian (2/2)	Pleasant Valley (8/8)	Addison (15/16)	
Year	6A	5A	4A	3A	2A	1A	Double A	Single A
2026	Bob Jones (3/3)	Spanish Fort (6/6)	Guntersville (7/7)	Central-Florence (1/1)	G.W. Long (2/2)	Addison (16/16)	McGill-Toolen (26/26)	Montgomery Academy (9/9)

Bayside Academy holds the all-time record with 31 titles.

Bayside Academy holds the most consecutive championships with 21 titles (2002–22) (Consecutive record for AHSAA girls sports).

== Wrestling ==
=== Boys (Traditional Tournament) ===
Since the tournament’s establishment in 1956, seventy tournaments have been held with a total of forty-four champions.

Year	7A	6A	5A	4A	3A	2A	1A
1956	--			Clift (Opelika) (1/2)			
1957	--			Robert E. Lee (1/5)			
1958	--			Clift (Opelika) (2/2)			
1959	--			Benjamin Russell (1/14)			
1960	--			Benjamin Russell (2/14)			
1961	--			Benjamin Russell (3/14)			
1962	--			Benjamin Russell (4/14)			
1963	--			Benjamin Russell (5/14)			
1964	--			Benjamin Russell (6/14)			
1965	--			Benjamin Russell (7/14)			
1966	--			Benjamin Russell (8/14)			
1967	--			Benjamin Russell (9/14)	Fairfield (1/3)		
1968	--			Benjamin Russell (10/14)	Fairfield (2/3)		
1969	--			Benjamin Russell (11/14)	Fairfield (3/3)		
1970	--			Butler (1/5)	Autauga County (Prattville) (1/1)		
1971	--			Walker (1/2)			
1972	--			W.A. Berry (1/5)	Alabama School for the Blind (1/1)		
1973	--			Butler (2/5)	Sheffield (1/1)		
1974	--			Hueytown (1/1)	Gardendale (1/4)		
1975	--			Butler (3/5)	Gardendale (2/4)		
1976	--			Vestavia Hills (1/17)	Jacksonville (1/2)		
1977	--			Butler (4/5)	Deshler (1/3)		
1978	--			Robert E. Lee (2/5)	Deshler (2/3)		
1979	--			Butler (5/5)	Jacksonville (2/2)		
1980	--			Robert E. Lee (3/5)	Pinson Valley (1/5)		
1981	--			Benjamin Russell (12/14)	Pinson Valley (2/5)		
1982	--			Benjamin Russell (13/14)	Pinson Valley (3/5)		
1983	--			Benjamin Russell (14/14) & Hewitt-Trussville (1/3)^{†}	Deshler (3/3)		
1984	--			Robert E. Lee (4/5)	Pinson Valley (4/5)		
1985	--	Vestavia Hills (2/17)	Southside-Gadsden (1/5)				
1986	--	Vestavia Hills (3/17)	Southside-Gadsden (2/5)				
1987	--	Hewitt-Trussville (2/3)	Southside-Gadsden (3/5)				
1988	--	Hewitt-Trussville (3/3)	Athens (1/8)				
1989	--	Grissom (1/7)	Southside-Gadsden (4/5)				
1990	--	Grissom (2/7)	Pinson Valley (5/5)				
1991	--	Vestavia Hills (4/17)	Athens (2/8)				
1992	--	Robert E. Lee (5/5)	Erwin (1/2)	Fultondale (1/3)			
1993	--	Vestavia Hills (5/17)	Athens (3/8)	Weaver (1/13)			
1994	--	Vestavia Hills (6/17)	Athens (4/8)	Fultondale (2/3)			
1995	--	Grissom (3/7)	Homewood (1/5)	Fultondale (3/3)			
1996	--	Grissom (4/7)	Athens (5/8)	Weaver (2/3)			
1997	--	Grissom (5/7)	Athens (6/8)	Weaver (3/13)			
1998	--	Vestavia Hills (7/17)	Scottsboro (1/8)	Weaver (4/13)			
1999	--	Vestavia Hills (8/17)	Erwin (2/2)	Weaver (5/13)			
2000	--	Vestavia Hills (9/17)	Hartselle (1/2)	Brookwood (1/1)			
2001	--	Vestavia Hills (10/17)	Homewood (2/5)	Weaver (6/13)			
2002	--	Grissom (6/7)	Homewood (3/5)	Weaver (7/13)			
2003	--	Hoover (2/5)	Homewood (4/5)	Weaver (8/13)			
2004	--	Grissom (7/7)	Homewood (5/5)	Weaver (9/13)			
2005	--	Hoover (3/5)	Hartselle (2/2)	Elmore County (1/1)			
2006	--	Hoover (4/5)	Scottsboro (2/8)	Walter Wellborn (1/4)			
2007	--	Vestavia Hills (11/17)	Scottsboro (3/8)	Walter Wellborn (2/4)			
2008	--	Vestavia Hills (12/17)	Scottsboro (4/8)	Walter Wellborn (3/4)			
2009	--	Vestavia Hills (13/17)	Scottsboro (5/8)	Piedmont (1/1)			
2010	--	Hoover (5/5)	Southside-Gadsden (5/5)	Walter Wellborn (4/4)			
2011	--	Thompson (1/10)	Arab (1/9)	St. Clair County (1/1)			
2012	--	Thompson (2/10)	Scottsboro (6/8)	Susan Moore (1/1)			
2013	--	Thompson (3/10)	Arab (2/9)	Saint James (1/1)			
2014	--	Thompson (4/10)	Arab (3/9)	Tallassee (1/2)			
2015	Thompson (5/10)	Arab (4/9)	Leeds (1/2)				
2016	Vestavia Hills (14/17)	Arab (5/9)	Leeds (2/2)				
2017	Vestavia Hills (15/17)	Oxford (1/2)	Arab (6/9)				
2018	Thompson (6/10)	Oxford (2/2)	Arab (7/9)				
2019	Thompson (7/10)	McAdory (1/2)	Moody (1/1)				
2020	Thompson (8/10)	Gardendale (3/4)	Arab (8/9)				
2021	Vestavia Hills (16/17)	Gardendale (4/4)		Ashville (1/1)			
2022	Thompson (9/10)	Mortimer Jordan (1/1)		Weaver (10/13)			
2023	Vestavia Hills (17/17)	McAdory (2/2)	Jasper (2/2)	Weaver (11/13)			
2024	Huntsville (1/1)	Mountain Brook (1/1)	Scottsboro (7/8)	Weaver (12/13)			
2025	Thompson (10/10)	Athens (7/8)	Scottsboro (8/8)	Tallassee (2/2)			
2026	Oak Mountain (1/1)	Athens (8/8)	Arab (9/9)	Weaver (13/13)			

^{†} Co-Champions

The Vestavia Hills Rebels hold the all-time record with 17 titles.

Benjamin Russell holds the most consecutive championships with 11 titles (1959–69).

=== Boys (Duals Tournament) ===
Since the tournament’s establishment in 2017, nine tournaments have been held with a total of fifteen champions.

Year	7A	6A	5A	4A	3A	2A	1A
2017	Vestavia Hills (1/1)	Oxford (1/3)	Arab (1/5)				
2018	Bob Jones (1/1)	Oxford (2/3)	Arab (2/5)				
2019	Thompson (1/5)	Oxford (3/3)	Scottsboro (1/3)				
2020	Thompson (2/5)	Gardendale (1/2)	Arab (3/5)				
2021	Thompson (3/5)	Gardendale (2/2)		Cleburne County (1/1)			
2022	Thompson (4/5)	Arab (4/5)		Ashville (1/1)			
2023	Huntsville (1/3)	Mountain Brook (1/3)	Jasper (1/1)	Dora (1/1)			
2024	Huntsville (2/3)	Mountain Brook (2/3)	Scottsboro (2/3)	Weaver (1/1)			
2025	Huntsville (3/3)	Mountain Brook (3/3)	Scottsboro (3/3)	Tallassee (1/2)			
2026	Thompson (5/5)	Athens (1/1)	Arab (5/5)	Tallassee (2/2)			

Thompson holds the all-time record with 5 titles. (Tie)

Arab holds the all-time record with 5 titles. (Tie)

Thompson holds the most consecutive championships with 4 titles.

=== Girls (Traditional Tournament) ===
Since the tournament’s establishment in 2025, one tournament has been held with a total of two champions.

Year	7A	6A	5A	4A	3A	2A	1A
2025	Thompson (1/1)		Weaver (1/2)				
2026	Daphne (1/1)		Weaver (2/2)				

== Champions overview ==
=== State Titles by Sport ===
Championship Teams
Sport	Tournaments held	Distinct Champions	Multi-title Champions	Consecutive Champions
Baseball	70	133	61	40
Boys Basketball	105	181	93	46
Girls Basketball	48	114	57	38
Boys Bowling	10	9	4	1
Girls Bowling	16	11	6	3
Boys Cross Country	71	59	36	31
Girls Cross Country	54	43	29	24
Flag Football	5	6	1	1
Football	60	132	74	39
Boys Golf	76	63	41	30
Girls Golf	52	34	16	13
Boys Indoor Track	55	53	27	22
Girls Indoor Track	46	43	21	17
Boys Soccer	34	37	20	11
Girls Soccer	34	33	22	16
Softball (fast pitch)	31	72	37	26
Boys Swimming	66	14	9	8
Girls Swimming	63	17	11	11
Boys Tennis	80	47	24	20
Girls Tennis	62	33	21	14
Boys Track & Field	100	107	64	51
Girls Track & Field	53	76	44	36
Volleyball	56	78	49	39
Boys Wrestling (Traditional)	70	44	29	20
Boys Wrestling (Duals)	9	15	7	7
Girls Wrestling	1	2	0	0

=== Top Teams by Sport ===
Leading Teams
Sport	1st place	2nd place	3rd place	4th place	5th place
Baseball	G.W. Long (17)	Hartselle (11)	Sweet Water	Hokes Bluff (9)	Tallassee
Baseball	G.W. Long (17)	Hartselle (11)	UMS-Wright	Hokes Bluff (9)	Tallassee
Baseball	G.W. Long (17)	Hartselle (11)	Vestavia Hills (10)	Hokes Bluff (9)	Trinity (7)
Boys Basketball	R.C. Hatch (11)	St. Jude (8)	Madison Academy (7)	Woodlawn	Buckhorn
Boys Basketball	R.C. Hatch (11)	St. Jude (8)	Madison Academy (7)	Sidney Lanier	Buckhorn
Boys Basketball	R.C. Hatch (11)	St. Jude (8)	Madison Academy (7)	Mountain Brook	Loachapoka
Boys Basketball	R.C. Hatch (11)	St. Jude (8)	Madison Academy (7)	Sumter County	Midfield
Boys Basketball	R.C. Hatch (11)	St. Jude (8)	Madison Academy (7)	Francis Marion	J.F. Shields
Boys Basketball	R.C. Hatch (11)	St. Jude (8)	Madison Academy (7)	Holy Family	Carver-Montgomery
Boys Basketball	R.C. Hatch (11)	St. Jude (8)	Madison Academy (7)	Wenonah	Central-Coosa (5)
Boys Basketball	R.C. Hatch (11)	St. Jude (8)	Madison Academy (7)	Butler (6)	Central-Coosa (5)
Girls Basketball	Lauderdale County (14)	Pisgah	Spring Garden (10)	Deshler	Fyffe (7)
Girls Basketball	Lauderdale County (14)	Pisgah	Spring Garden (10)	Wenonah	Fyffe (7)
Girls Basketball	Lauderdale County (14)	Hoover (11)	Spring Garden (10)	Mars Hill Bible	Fyffe (7)
Girls Basketball	Lauderdale County (14)	Hoover (11)	Spring Garden (10)	Hazel Green (8)	Fyffe (7)
Boys Bowling	Spain Park (4)	Sparkman	Buckhorn	--	--
Boys Bowling	Spain Park (4)	Sparkman	Thompson	--	--
Boys Bowling	Spain Park (4)	Etowah	East Limestone	--	--
Boys Bowling	Spain Park (4)	Etowah	American Christian	--	--
Boys Bowling	Spain Park (4)	Vestavia Hills (2)	John Carroll (1)	--	--
Girls Bowling	Southside-Gadsden (5)	Sparkman (3)	Bradshaw	Satsuma	--
Girls Bowling	Southside-Gadsden (5)	Sparkman (3)	Huffman	Thompson	--
Girls Bowling	Southside-Gadsden (5)	Sparkman (3)	Hewitt-Trussville	Beauregard	--
Girls Bowling	Southside-Gadsden (5)	Sparkman (3)	Hewitt-Trussville	Scottsboro	--
Girls Bowling	Southside-Gadsden (5)	Sparkman (3)	American Christian (2)	Stanhope Elmore (1)	--
Boys Cross Country	Scottsboro (20)	Mountain Brook (19)	Hoover (16)	Auburn	Murphy
Boys Cross Country	Scottsboro (20)	Mountain Brook (19)	Hoover (16)	Randolph	Murphy
Boys Cross Country	Scottsboro (20)	Mountain Brook (19)	Hoover (16)	St. Paul’s Episopal (10)	Huntsville (9)
Girls Cross Country	Mountain Brook (29)	Scottsboro (25)	St. Paul’s Episcopal (19)	Grissom (11)	Lawrence County (9)
Flag Football	Central-Phenix City (3)	Hewitt-Trussville	--	--	--
Flag Football	Central-Phenix City (3)	Auburn	--	--	--
Flag Football	Central-Phenix City (3)	Wenonah	--	--	--
Flag Football	Central-Phenix City (3)	Montgomery Catholic	--	--	--
Flag Football	Central-Phenix City (3)	Moody (1)	--	--	--
Football	Hoover (13)	Hazlewood	UMS-Wright (9)	Fyffe	Clay County
Football	Hoover (13)	Hazlewood	UMS-Wright (9)	Fyffe	T.R. Miller
Football	Hoover (13)	Sweet Water (11)	UMS-Wright (9)	Leroy	Colbert County
Football	Hoover (13)	Sweet Water (11)	UMS-Wright (9)	Thompson (7)	Homewood (6)
Boys Golf	UMS-Wright (27)	St. Paul’s Episcopal (12)	Mountain Brook (10)	Houston Academy	Spain Park (8)
Boys Golf	UMS-Wright (27)	St. Paul’s Episcopal (12)	Mountain Brook (10)	Montgomery Academy (9)	Spain Park (8)
Girls Golf	McGill-Toolen (14)	Mountain Brook (10)	Hoover (7)	Spain Park	Tuscaloosa Academy
Girls Golf	McGill-Toolen (14)	Mountain Brook (10)	Hoover (7)	Muscle Shoals	Providence Christian
Girls Golf	McGill-Toolen (14)	Mountain Brook (10)	Hoover (7)	Hartselle	White Plains (3)
Girls Golf	McGill-Toolen (14)	Mountain Brook (10)	Hoover (7)	Auburn	White Plains (3)
Girls Golf	McGill-Toolen (14)	Mountain Brook (10)	Hoover (7)	Pike Road (4)	White Plains (3)
Boys Indoor Track	UMS-Wright (16)	Hoover (14)	St. Paul’s Episcopal (12)	Scottsboro (11)	Robert E. Lee
Boys Indoor Track	UMS-Wright (16)	Hoover (14)	St. Paul’s Episcopal (12)	Scottsboro (11)	Homewood (8)
Girls Indoor Track	Mountain Brook (24)	St. Paul’s Episcopal (23)	Hoover (13)	Altamont (7)	Scottsboro
Girls Indoor Track	Mountain Brook (24)	St. Paul’s Episcopal (23)	Hoover (13)	Altamont (7)	UMS-Wright (5)
Boys Soccer	John Carroll (11)	Randolph	Homewood (7)	Bayside Academy (6)	Briarwood
Boys Soccer	John Carroll (11)	Oak Mountain	Homewood (7)	Bayside Academy (6)	Briarwood
Boys Soccer	John Carroll (11)	Grissom (8)	Homewood (7)	Bayside Academy (6)	Indian Springs (5)
Girls Soccer	Briarwood (10)	Montgomery Academy (9)	Fort Payne (8)	Vestavia Hills (7)	Grissom
Girls Soccer	Briarwood (10)	Montgomery Academy (9)	Fort Payne (8)	Vestavia Hills (7)	John Carroll
Girls Soccer	Briarwood (10)	Montgomery Academy (9)	Fort Payne (8)	Vestavia Hills (7)	Mountain Brook
Girls Soccer	Briarwood (10)	Montgomery Academy (9)	Fort Payne (8)	Vestavia Hills (7)	Spain Park (5)
Softball (fast pitch)	Pisgah (10)	Alabama Christian (9)	Brantley	Hartselle	Baker
Softball (fast pitch)	Pisgah (10)	Alabama Christian (9)	Brantley	Hartselle	Hale County
Softball (fast pitch)	Pisgah (10)	Alabama Christian (9)	Brantley	Hartselle	Hueytown
Softball (fast pitch)	Pisgah (10)	Alabama Christian (9)	Hatton	Hoover	Mortimer Jordan
Softball (fast pitch)	Pisgah (10)	Alabama Christian (9)	Hatton	Hoover	Thompson
Softball (fast pitch)	Pisgah (10)	Alabama Christian (9)	Hatton	Hoover	Ragland
Softball (fast pitch)	Pisgah (10)	Alabama Christian (9)	Sparkman (6)	Saint James	
Softball (fast pitch)	Pisgah (10)	Alabama Christian (9)	Sparkman (6)	Saint James	Springville
Softball (fast pitch)	Pisgah (10)	Alabama Christian (9)	Sparkman (6)	Saint James	Sumiton Christian (4)
Softball (fast pitch)	Pisgah (10)	Alabama Christian (9)	Orange Beach (6)	Hewitt-Trussville (5)	Sumiton Christian (4)
Boys Swimming	Huntsville (22)	Grissom (16)	Hoover (10)	Bob Jones (9)	Tuscaloosa (6)
Girls Swimming	Grissom (19)	Huntsville (13)	Mountain Brook (6)	Hoover	St. Paul’s
Girls Swimming	Grissom (19)	Huntsville (13)	Mountain Brook (6)	Auburn	UMS-Wright
Girls Swimming	Grissom (19)	Huntsville (13)	Mountain Brook (6)	Westminster Christian (5)	Bob Jones (4)
Boys Tennis	Mountain Brook (29)	Montgomery Academy (17)	UMS-Wright (16)	St. Paul’s Episcopal (14)	Jasper
Boys Tennis	Mountain Brook (29)	Montgomery Academy (17)	UMS-Wright (16)	St. Paul’s Episcopal (14)	Sylacauga
Boys Tennis	Mountain Brook (29)	Montgomery Academy (17)	UMS-Wright (16)	St. Paul’s Episcopal (14)	Vestavia Hills (10)
Girls Tennis	Mountain Brook (34)	St. Paul’s Episcopal (19)	Montgomery Academy (18)	UMS-Wright (17)	Vestavia Hills (15)
Boys Track & Field	UMS-Wright (24)	St. Paul’s Episcopal (17)	Hazlewood (16)	Hoover (13)	Opelika (11)
Girls Track & Field	St. Paul’s Episcopal (25)	UMS-Wright (17)	Hoover (15)	Mountain Brook	Hazlewood (13)
Girls Track & Field	St. Paul’s Episcopal (25)	UMS-Wright (17)	Hoover (15)	Altamont (14)	Hazlewood (13)
Volleyball	Bayside Academy (31)	McGill-Toolen (26)	Addison	Donoho (13)	Huntsville (11)
Volleyball	Bayside Academy (31)	McGill-Toolen (26)	St. Paul’s Episcopal (16)	Donoho (13)	Huntsville (11)
Boys Wrestling (Traditional)	Vestavia Hills (17)	Benjamin Russell (14)	Weaver (12)	Thompson (10)	Arab (8)
Boys Wrestling (Duals)	Arab	Oxford	Gardendale (2)	Weaver	--
Boys Wrestling (Duals)	Arab	Oxford	Gardendale (2)	Bob Jones	--
Boys Wrestling (Duals)	Thompson (4)	Huntsville	Gardendale (2)	Vestavia Hills	--
Boys Wrestling (Duals)	Thompson (4)	Huntsville	Gardendale (2)	Ashville	--
Boys Wrestling (Duals)	Thompson (4)	Scottsboro	Gardendale (2)	Cleburne County	--
Boys Wrestling (Duals)	Thompson (4)	Scottsboro	Gardendale (2)	Dora	--
Boys Wrestling (Duals)	Thompson (4)	Mountain Brook (3)	Gardendale (2)	Jasper	--
Boys Wrestling (Duals)	Thompson (4)	Mountain Brook (3)	Gardendale (2)	Tallassee (1)	--
Girls Wrestling (Traditional)	Thompson	--	--	--	--
Girls Wrestling (Traditional)	Weaver (1)	--	--	--	--

=== All-time leading teams ===
Category	1st place	2nd place	3rd place	4th place	5th place
Boys Sports	UMS-Wright (113)	Hoover (87)	St. Paul’s Episcopal (81)	Mountain Brook (76)	Vestavia Hills (59)
Girls Sports	Mountain Brook (129)	St. Paul’s Episcopal (110)	Hoover (61)	UMS-Wright (54)	Bayside Academy (50)
Overall Sports	Mountain Brook (205)	St. Paul’s Episcopal (191)	UMS-Wright (167)	Hoover (148)	Scottsboro (95)
