= Harlon Hill =

American football player (1932–2013)

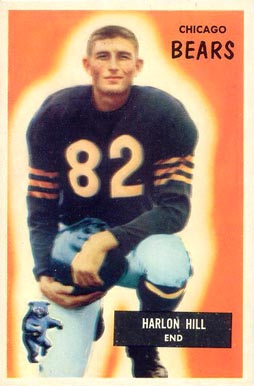
- Hill on a 1955 Bowman football card

No. 87, 82
- Positions: End, defensive back

Personal information
- Born: May 4, 1932; Killen, Alabama, U.S.
- Died: March 21, 2013 (aged 80); Florence, Alabama, U.S.
- Listed height: 6 ft 3 in (1.91 m)
- Listed weight: 199 lb (90 kg)

Career information
- High school: Lauderdale (Rogersville, Alabama)
- College: Florence State (1950–1953)
- NFL draft: 1954: 15th round, 174th overall pick

Career history
- Chicago Bears (1954–1961); Pittsburgh Steelers (1962); Detroit Lions (1962)

Awards and highlights
- NFL Most Valuable Player (1955); 2× First-team All-Pro (1955, 1956); Second-team All-Pro (1954); 3× Pro Bowl (1954–1956); 2× NFL receiving touchdowns leader (1954, 1955); 100 greatest Bears of All-Time

Career NFL statistics
- Receptions: 233
- Receiving yards: 4,717
- Receiving touchdowns: 40
- Stats at Pro Football Reference

Harlon Junius Hill (May 4, 1932 – March 21, 2013) was an American professional football end who played for nine seasons in the National Football League (NFL). Hill played for the Chicago Bears, the Pittsburgh Steelers, and the Detroit Lions. He was the NFL Rookie of the Year in 1954 and winner of the Jim Thorpe Trophy as the NFL Most Valuable Player in 1955. The Harlon Hill Trophy, named in his honor, is awarded annually to the nation's best NCAA Division II football player. After his playing career, he became a coach and educator.

== Early life and college ==
Hill was born in Killen, Alabama. Following graduation from Lauderdale County High School in nearby Rogersville in 1949, he attended Florence State Teachers College, now known as the University of North Alabama. Football was just making its return to Florence State in 1949 after several years absence due to low male enrollment. Hill was a four-year letterman on the football team, while also earning a Bachelor of Science degree in Education.

He played both offense and defense, but it was his offensive efforts that saw him named an NAIA All-American player his senior year in 1953. As with many college teams of the era, Florence State was a run-based offense and threw the ball sparingly. However, Hill made the most of his chances with 19 of his 54 career catches going for touchdowns.

In his 1977 biography Victory after the Game, Hill related his surprise at being selected in the 15th round of the 1954 NFL draft by the Chicago Bears, remaining unaware of it until approached with the news by a Florence State professor on campus: '"I had no idea I had been `discovered.' I really did not know much about the National Football League...I did not know what to think, but after I found out what it was all about, naturally I was elated." Hill went on to say he owed the discovery to a rival school. A coach for Jacksonville State University had observed Hill's play over four seasons and mentioned him to a Bears scout.

== Professional career ==
Hill's rookie season with the Chicago Bears was a memorable one. He set a team record for most receiving yards (1,124) and most touchdown receptions (12) by a rookie. The twelve touchdowns led all NFL receivers that season as he averaged 25 yards per catch on 45 total receptions, the latter of which was a Bears record for a rookie until it was broken by Darnell Mooney in 2020. His best performance that rookie year came on October 31, 1954, against the San Francisco 49ers. Hill was a Halloween nightmare for the 49ers defense, racking up 214 receiving yards and four touchdowns, the final one coming with thirty seconds left in the game to give the Bears a four-point victory. Numerous accolades came Hill's way following that season, among them being named 1954 NFL Rookie of the Year, being an All-Pro selection, and participating in the 1954 Pro Bowl.

Hill's performance numbers were down somewhat the next season, 1955, with 789 yards on 42 receptions. However, his nine touchdown catches again led the league, and he was once again selected All-Pro and Pro-Bowl participant. Fellow players voted him the first inaugural winner of the Jim Thorpe Trophy as league's most valuable player. 1956 would prove to be Hill's career best statistically with 47 catches, 1,128 receiving yards and 11 touchdowns as the Bears advanced to the NFL Championship Game against the New York Giants. Hill and the Bears were beaten soundly, 47–7, on a very icy Yankee Stadium field. After the season Hill was voted a first-team All-NFL player by numerous media including the Associated Press, United Press, and the Sporting News. He was chosen Captain of the Western Conference squad for the 1956 Pro Bowl game, which lost in a close affair, 31–30.

Injuries began to take their toll on Hill's NFL career in the late 1950s, the most serious one being a completely severed Achilles tendon in 1958. According to Hill, he was the first professional athlete to recover from the surgical repair and continue his career. The injury robbed him of much of his speed however and his offensive numbers steadily declined, with his last touchdown reception coming in the 1959 season. By 1961, his final year as a Bear, he managed only three catches for 51 yards on the season. Hill attempted to play again in the 1962 season, splitting time between the Steelers and Lions and accumulating 101 receiving yards on 14 catches. He retired from football at the conclusion of the 1962 season. Hill still holds several franchise records with the Bears and ranks among the best in others. His nineteen games with 100 or more receiving yards are still a record as are his 1,124 rookie receiving yards and 12 rookie touchdown catches. The four touchdown receptions in one game (San Francisco, 1954) are tied with Mike Ditka for team lead all-time. His career 4,616 receiving yards and 40 career touchdown receptions (32 of them coming in a 3-year span from 1954 through 1956) rank him second best all-time for Chicago.

The Professional Football Researchers Association named Hill to the PRFA Hall of Very Good Class of 2014.

=== Franchise records ===
As of 2019's NFL off-season, Harlon Hill held at least 15 Bears franchise records, including:

- Most Receiving Yds (rookie season): 1,124 (1954)
- Most Receiving Yds (game, as a rookie): 214 (1954-10-31 @SFO)
- Most Yds/Rec (career): 20.42
- Most Yds/Rec (season): 24.98 (1954)
- Most Yds/Rec (rookie season): 24.98 (1954)
- Most Receiving TDs (career): 40
- Most Receiving TDs (game): 4 (1954-10-31 @SFO)
- Most Receiving TDs (rookie season): 12 (1954; tied with Mike Ditka)
- Most Receiving TDs (game, as a rookie): 4 (1954-10-31 @SFO)
- Most Rec Yds/Game (rookie season): 93.7 (1954)
- Most Yds from Scrimmage (game, as a rookie): 214 (1954-10-31 @SFO)
- Most 100+ yard receiving games (career): 19
- Most 100+ yard receiving games (season): 7 (1954; tied with Jeff Graham and Brandon Marshall)
- Most 100+ yard receiving games (rookie season): 7
- Most 1000+ receiving yard seasons: 2 (one of five players)

== NFL career statistics ==
Legend
	Led the league
**Bold**	Career high

=== Regular season ===
Year	Team	Games		Receiving				
Year	Team	GP	GS	Rec	Yds	Avg	Lng	TD
1954	CHI	12	12	45	1,124	**25.0**	76	**12**
1955	CHI	12	12	42	789	18.8	86	9
1956	CHI	12	12	**47**	**1,128**	24.0	79	11
1957	CHI	8	8	21	483	23.0	53	2
1958	CHI	8	8	27	365	13.5	40	3
1959	CHI	11	10	36	578	16.1	**88**	3
1960	CHI	12	2	5	98	19.6	45	0
1961	CHI	14	8	3	51	17.0	23	0
1962	PIT	7	6	7	101	14.4	25	0
1962	DET	7	0	0	0	0.0	0	0
Career		103	78	233	4,717	20.2	88	40

=== Playoffs ===
Year	Team	Games		Receiving				
Year	Team	GP	GS	Rec	Yds	Avg	Lng	TD
1956	CHI	1	1	6	87	14.5	17	0
Career		1	1	6	87	14.5	17	0

== Life after the NFL ==
Hill returned to his native Alabama when his playing days were finished. He fought a successful battle against alcoholism and returned to his alma mater (then known as Florence State Teachers College), serving as an assistant football coach for the University of North Alabama in the late 1960s while also working toward a Master's degree in Education. After earning his Master's in 1969 he became a public school teacher and coach at Brooks High School, eventually becoming the school's principal. In 1986 a new award was created to highlight America's best NCAA Division II players, named the Harlon Hill Trophy in honor of his playing career. Often considered the Division II equivalent of the Heisman Trophy, it is awarded annually during the NCAA Division II Football Championship weekend in Florence, Alabama. Hill retired from the Lauderdale County, Alabama, school system and resided in Alabama until his death. Hill died March 21, 2013, at Eliza Coffee Memorial Hospital in Florence, Alabama, following a prolonged illness.
