= 2024 North Alabama Lions football team =

American college football season

2024 North Alabama Lions football
- Conference: United Athletic Conference
- Record: 3–9 (3–5 UAC)
- Head coach: Brent Dearmon (2nd season)
- Offensive coordinator: Kevin Wewers (2nd season)
- Defensive coordinator: Brock Caraboa (2nd season)
- Home stadium: Braly Municipal Stadium

2024 United Athletic Conference standings
	Conf.			Overall
Team	W		L	W		L
No. 14 Abilene Christian $^	7	–	1	9	–	5
No. 13 Tarleton State ^	6	–	2	10	–	4
No. 21 Eastern Kentucky ^	6	–	2	8	–	5
Southern Utah	6	–	2	7	–	5
Central Arkansas	3	–	5	6	–	6
Austin Peay	3	–	5	4	–	8
North Alabama	3	–	5	3	–	9
West Georgia*	1	–	7	4	–	7
Utah Tech	1	–	7	1	–	11
$ – Conference champion; ^ – FCS playoff participant; Note: West Georgia is ineligible for the UAC title and FCS postseason play due to transition from NCAA Division II.; Rankings from STATS Poll

The 2024 North Alabama Lions football team represented North Alabama University in the United Athletic Conference (UAC) during the 2024 NCAA Division I FCS football season. The Lions were led by second-year head coach Brent Dearmon. The team played its home games at Braly Municipal Stadium in Florence, Alabama.

== Offseason ==
=== Transfers ===
==== Outgoing ====
The Lions lost 5 players to the transfer portal.

Player	Position	New school
Tylen Campbell	WR	South Alabama
Elijah Elmore	DL	Alabama State
Demarcus Lacey	RB	Jacksonville State
K.J. Trujillo	DB	Idaho
Noah Walters	QB	None

==== Incoming ====
The Lions added 22 players from the transfer portal.

Player	Position	Previous school
Jayvian Allen	RB	Tennessee Tech
Travelle Anderson	RB	Central Arkansas
Anthony Bauer	OL	Louisiana–Monroe
Christopher Burnett	DB	Copiah–Lincoln CC
Dominic Braesch	OL	Georgia State
Jackson Bratton	LB	UAB
Logan Collier	WR	Lindsey Wilson
Travis Collier	DB	Jacksonville State
Hayden Edge	OL	Stetson
Walter Goggins	DL	Mercer
Jahbari Hill	DB	Florida Atlantic
Michael Jordan Jr.	DB	Lehigh
Marlon Krakue	DL	Florida Atlantic
Cade Mansmann	RB	Troy
Caleb McDougle	DB	Alabama
Ari Patu	QB	Stanford
Scott Payne	K	Middle Tennessee
Jermaine Ray Jr.	DB	Northeast Mississippi CC
Tanaka Scott	WR	Kansas
Jayme Motley-Simmons	OL	Samford
Rayqwon Smith	DL	Tennessee State
DC Tabscott	QB	New Mexico

=== Recruiting class ===
College recruiting information (2024)
Name	Hometown	School	Height	Weight	Commit date
Josh Anglin; LB	Hoschton, Georgia	Mill Creek High School	6 ft 0 in (1.83 m)	215 lb (98 kg)	Dec 20, 2023
Josh Anglin; LB	Recruit ratings: 247Sports:				
Myron Dunklin; WR	Saraland, Alabama	Saraland High School	6 ft 0 in (1.83 m)	195 lb (88 kg)	Jun 26, 2023
Myron Dunklin; WR	Recruit ratings: 247Sports:				
Jalen Fletcher; RB	Trinity, Alabama	West Morgan High School	5 ft 7 in (1.70 m)	165 lb (75 kg)	Dec 20, 2023
Jalen Fletcher; RB	Recruit ratings: No ratings found				
Kemon Folse; DB	Thibodaux, Louisiana	Thibodaux High School	5 ft 11 in (1.80 m)	155 lb (70 kg)	Dec 20, 2023
Kemon Folse; DB	Recruit ratings: No ratings found				
Leo Glover; ATH	Florence, Alabama	Florence High School	6 ft 2 in (1.88 m)	200 lb (91 kg)	Dec 20, 2023
Leo Glover; ATH	Recruit ratings: No ratings found				
Clint Houser; WR	Montgomery, Alabama	Saint James School	5 ft 10 in (1.78 m)	165 lb (75 kg)	Dec 20, 2023
Clint Houser; WR	Recruit ratings: No ratings found				
Jon Nolan Lawrence; OL	Greenville, Alabama	Fort Dale Academy	6 ft 5 in (1.96 m)	275 lb (125 kg)	Dec 20, 2023
Jon Nolan Lawrence; OL	Recruit ratings: No ratings found				
Kingston Lowe; DL/LB	Gulf Shores, Alabama	Gulf Shores High School	6 ft 0 in (1.83 m)	225 lb (102 kg)	Dec 20, 2023
Kingston Lowe; DL/LB	Recruit ratings: No ratings found				
Roderick Taylor; RB	Thibodaux, Louisiana	Thibodaux High School	6 ft 0 in (1.83 m)	187 lb (85 kg)	Dec 20, 2023
Roderick Taylor; RB	Recruit ratings: No ratings found				
Fred Vili; DL	Enterprise, Alabama	Enterprise High School	6 ft 1 in (1.85 m)	250 lb (110 kg)	Dec 20, 2023
Fred Vili; DL	Recruit ratings: No ratings found				
Jackson Ward; EDGE	Pace, Florida	Pace High School	6 ft 4 in (1.93 m)	240 lb (110 kg)	Dec 20, 2023
Jackson Ward; EDGE	Recruit ratings: No ratings found				
Carson Wheeler; OL	Killen, Alabama	Brooks High School	6 ft 3 in (1.91 m)	295 lb (134 kg)	Dec 20, 2023
Carson Wheeler; OL	Recruit ratings: No ratings found				
Anthony "Tre" Young; DB	Birmingham, Alabama	Wenonah High School	6 ft 1 in (1.85 m)	170 lb (77 kg)	Dec 20, 2023
Anthony "Tre" Young; DB	Recruit ratings: No ratings found				
Overall recruit ranking:
Note: In many cases, Scout, Rivals, 247Sports, On3, and ESPN may conflict in their listings of height and weight.; In these cases, the average was taken. ESPN grades are on a 100-point scale.; Sources: "Rivals commits". Rivals.; "2024 Team Ranking". Rivals.com.; "247Sports commits". 247Sports.

== Preseason ==
=== Spring game ===
North Alabama Purple vs White

Quarter	1	2	3	4	Total
Purple	0	14	8	0	22
White	17	7	3	6	33

at Bill Jones Athletic Complex • Florence, Alabama

- Date: March 21
- Game time: 6:30 p.m. CDT
- Game weather: Sunny, 54 °F (12 °C)
- Game attendance: 1,500

Game information

First quarter

- WHITE – TJ Smith 10-yard run, Scott Payne kick (White 7–0)
- WHITE – Kaleb Heatherly 23-yard pass from TJ Smith, Sam Contorno kick (White 14–0)
- WHITE – Scott Payne 47-yard field goal (White 17–0)

Second quarter

- PURPLE – Dennis Moody 1-yard run, Nathan Ogletree kick (White 17–7)
- PURPLE – JJ Evans 11-yard pass from Noah Walters, Zach Aird kick (White 17–14)
- WHITE – Takairee Kenebrew 20-yard pass from TJ Smith, Scott Payne kick (White 24–14)

Third quarter

- PURPLE – Noah Walters 8-yard run, Justin Luke pass from Noah Walters (White 24–22)
- WHITE – Sam Contorno 53-yard field goal (White 27–22)

Fourth quarter

- WHITE – Ben Harris 8-yard pass from TJ Smith (White 33–22)

Over 1,500 fans packed Bill Jones Athletic Complex for the 2024 University of North Alabama Purple vs White Spring Game. Both teams were stocked with its own respective players and coaches. Offensive coordinator Kevin Wewers coached Team White, while defensive coordinator Brock Caraboa coached Team Purple.

Team White led 17–0 after 1 quarter. Quarterback TJ Smith ran for an 8-yard touchdown to start the game, and then tight end Kaleb Heatherly caught a 23-yard touchdown from Smith, with transfer kicker Scott Payne closing the scoring with a 47-yard field goal. Team Purple would cut the deficit to 3 before halftime, after a 1-yard touchdown run from Dennis Moody and an 11-yard touchdown pass to wide receiver JJ Evans from quarterback Noah Walters, but receiver Takairee Kenebrew caught a 20-yard pass from TJ Smith to take a 24–14 lead at the half. Team Purple would start the 2nd half strong, after Noah Walters ran for an 8-yard touchdown and receiver Justin Luke caught the two-point pass from Walters. Team White would immediately answer with Sam Contorno hitting a 53-yard field goal. On the final play of the game, Kevin Wewers of Team White called a trick play, with transfer running back Jayvian "Juice" Allen taking the snap, handing it off to TJ Smith, who threw it to quarterback Ben Harris in the endzone for the 8-yard touchdown, capping the action with their 33–22 win.

=== Media Day ===
The 2024 UAC Media Day was held on July 23, 2024 at Texas Live! in Arlington, TX. The Preseason Polls were released on the 23rd as well. Each team had their head coach available to talk to the media at the event along with a few players. Head coach Brent Dearmon, along with players Takairee Kenebrew and Jackson Bratton, were made available for media availability. Coverage of the event was televised on ESPN+.

UAC coaches' poll
Predicted finish	Team	Votes (1st place)
1	Central Arkansas	77 (5)
2	Tarleton State	74 (3)
3	Southern Utah	54
4	Eastern Kentucky	53
5	Austin Peay	46 (1)
6	Abilene Christian	43
7	North Alabama	26
8	Utah Tech	19
9	West Georgia	13

=== Preseason All-UAC honors ===
Preseason Defensive Player of the Year

Position	Player	Class
DB	Edwin White Schultz	Redshirt JR

All-Conference Team Selections

Position	Player	Class
Offense
WR	Takairee Kenebrew	Redshirt Graduate
Defense
DB	Edwin White Schultz	Redshirt JR

== Schedule ==
North Alabama will begin its 2024 campaign with a slate of four non-conference games. The Lions will start with a Week 0 face off against the Southeast Missouri Redhawks on August 24. This was originally slated to be held in Cape Girardeau, Missouri before becoming the FCS Kickoff game in Montgomery, Alabama. This game will also mark their first matchup since 1956. The Lions' first road game will be an against the Division I FBS-level Memphis Tigers on August 31. This will be their first game against one another since 2022 and the second all-time meeting of the 2 schools. North Alabama will stay on the road to face UT Martin on September 14 in Martin, Tennessee. The Lions' home opener will be on September 21 as North Alabama welcomes Illinois State Redbirds to Braly Stadium. This will start a home and home series between the schools and it will also be the first ever meeting of the 2 teams.

North Alabama and the UAC announced the 2024 football schedule on November 14, 2023. This schedule was later revised on June 10, 2024 as Stephen F. Austin left the conference. The 2024 Lions' schedule consists of 5 home games and 6 away games for the regular season. North Alabama will host four UAC conference opponents Tarleton State, Abilene Christian, Austin Peay and Utah Tech at home and will travel to four UAC opponents West Georgia, Central Arkansas, Southern Utah and Eastern Kentucky.

West Georgia is the newest member of the United Athletic Conference and will join in July 2024 as a part of their transition to Division I athletics. This will revive a former Gulf South Conference rivalry as West Georgia and North Alabama played each other for 35 consecutive years from 1983 until the Lions made the jump to Division I after 2017. Their meeting on September 28 will mark their first meeting since 2017.

Date	Time	Opponent	Site	TV	Result	Attendance
August 24	6:00 p.m.	vs. Southeast Missouri State*	Cramton Bowl; Montgomery, AL (FCS Kickoff)	ESPN	L 15–37	4,358
August 31	6:00 p.m.	at Memphis*	Simmons Bank Liberty Stadium; Memphis, TN	ESPN+	L 0–40	25,849
September 7	6:00 p.m.	No. 21 Illinois State*	Braly Municipal Stadium; Florence, AL	ESPN+	L 14–24	8,014
September 14	6:00 p.m.	at UT Martin*	Graham Stadium; Martin, TN	ESPN+	L 28-43	3,417
September 21	6:00 p.m.	No. 16 Tarleton State	Braly Municipal Stadium; Florence, AL	ESPN+	L 14–28	7,432
September 28	1:00 p.m.	at West Georgia	University Stadium; Carrollton, GA	ESPN+	W 25–16	3,957
October 5	4:00 p.m.	Utah Tech	Braly Municipal Stadium; Florence, AL	ESPN+	W 60–14	6,875
October 12	6:00 p.m.	No. 10 Abilene Christian^{†}	Braly Municipal Stadium; Florence, AL	ESPN+	W 47–34	9,918
October 26	4:00 p.m.	at No. 12 Central Arkansas	Estes Stadium; Conway, AR	ESPN+	L 19–24	8,794
November 2	4:00 p.m.	Austin Peay	Braly Municipal Stadium; Florence, AL	ESPN+	L 17–31	7,286
November 9	2:00 p.m.	at Southern Utah	Eccles Coliseum; Cedar City, UT	ESPN+	L 26–38	3,042
November 23	1:00 p.m.	at No. 25 Eastern Kentucky	Roy Kidd Stadium; Richmond, KY	ESPN+	L 15–21	4,226
*Non-conference game; ^{†}Homecoming; Rankings from STATS Poll released prior to the game; All times are in Central time

== Game summaries ==
=== vs. Southeast Missouri State ===
Game One – North Alabama Lions (0–0) vs. Southeast Missouri State Redhawks (0–0) – Game summary

Quarter	1	2	3	4	Total
Lions	8	7	0	0	15
Redhawks	7	6	8	16	37

at Cramton Bowl • Montgomery, Alabama

- Date: August 24
- Game time: 6:00 p.m. CDT
- Game weather: Wind: SW at 8 miles per hour (13 km/h) • Weather: Sunny • Temp: 89 °F (32 °C)
- Game attendance: 4,358
- Referee: Brad Carrell
- TV announcers (ESPN): Jay Alter (play-by-play) and Rocky Boiman (analyst)

Game information

First quarter

- (7:13) SEMO – Cam Pedro 4-yard pass from Paxton DeLaurent (DC Pippin kick) (Drive: 12 plays, 57 yards, 4:28; SEMO 7-0)
- (1:22) UNA – Jayvian Allen 3-yard run (Ben Harris pass to Tanaka Scott) (Drive: 7 plays, 85 yards, 3:47; UNA 8-7)

Second quarter

- (4:11) UNA – Ari Patu 11-yard run (Sam Contorno kick) (Drive: 5 plays, 61 yards, 1:49; UNA 15-7)
- (0:18) SEMO – Payton Brown 1-yard run (Two-point conversion no-good) (Drive: 10 plays, 46 yards, 3:53; UNA 15-13)

Third quarter

- (0:15) SEMO – Payton Brown 25-yard run (Brandon Epton Jr run) (Drive: 9 plays, 73 yards, 4:26; SEMO 21-15)

Fourth quarter

- (7:13) SEMO – Payton Brown 1-yard run (Two-point conversion no-good) (Drive: 9 plays, 73 yards, 4:26; SEMO 27-15)
- (5:32) SEMO – Carter Hensley 1-yard run (DC Pippin kick) (Drive: 3 plays, 19 yards, 1:21; SEMO 34-15)
- (2:43) SEMO – DC Pippin 41-yard field goal (Drive: 4 plays, 7 yards, 2:19; SEMO 37-15)

Statistics	UNA	SEMO
First downs	16	23
Total yards	320	372
Rushing yards	216	176
Passing yards	104	196
Passing: Comp–Att–Int	12-24-2	24-31
Turnovers	4	1
Time of possession	23:21	36:39

Team	Category	Player	Statistics
North Alabama	Passing	Ari Patu	12/24, 104 yards, 2 INT
North Alabama	Rushing	Jayvian Allen	13 carries, 100 yards, TD
North Alabama	Receiving	Kobe Warden	5 receptions, 50 yards
Southeast Missouri State	Passing	Carter Hensley	10/14, 100 yards
Southeast Missouri State	Rushing	Payton Brown	19 carries, 97 yards, 3 TD
Southeast Missouri State	Receiving	Dorian Anderson	5 receptions, 71 yards

=== at Memphis ===
Game Two – North Alabama Lions (0-1) at Memphis Tigers (0-0) – Game summary

Quarter	1	2	3	4	Total
Lions	0	0	0	0	0
Tigers	7	24	3	6	40

at Simmons Bank Liberty Stadium • Memphis, TN

- Date: Saturday August 31, 2024
- Game time: 6:00 p.m.
- Game weather: Wind: SE at 5 miles per hour (8.0 km/h) • Weather: Cloudy • Temp: 89 °F (32 °C)
- Game attendance: 25,849
- Referee: Steven Anderson
- TV announcers (ESPN+): James Westling and Leger Douzable

Game information

First quarter

- (10:05) MEM – Mario Anderson Jr 4-yard run (Caden Costa kick) (Drive: 10 plays, 70 yards, 4:48; MEM 7-0)

Second quarter

- (14:56) MEM – Anthony Landphere 2-yard pass from Seth Henigan (Caden Costa kick) (Drive: 9 plays, 52 yards, 3:56; MEM 14-0)
- (8:11) MEM – Brendan Doyle 32-yard pass from Seth Henigan (Caden Costa kick) (Drive: 3 plays, 54 yards, 1:37; MEM 21-0)
- (5:20) MEM – Mario Anderson Jr 5-yard run (Caden Costa kick) (Drive: 3 plays, 26 yards, 1:20; MEM 28-0)
- (0:34) MEM – Caden Costa 38-yard field goal (Drive: 8 plays, 35 yards, 2:31; MEM 31-0)

Third quarter

- (1:25) MEM – Caden Costa 21-yard field goal (Drive: 7 plays, 59 yards, 3:35; MEM 34-0)

Fourth quarter

- (12:29) MEM – Greg Desrosiers Jr 5-yard run (Caden Costa kick no-good) (Drive: 4 plays, 63 yards, 2:20; MEM 40-0)

Statistics	UNA	MEM
First downs	11	17
Total yards	185	372
Rushing yards	67	64
Passing yards	118	308
Passing: Comp–Att–Int	17-28-2	22-30
Time of possession	32:44	27:16

Team	Category	Player	Statistics
North Alabama	Passing	Ari Patu	15/26, 103 yards, 2 INT
North Alabama	Rushing	Dennis Moody	13 carries, 39 yards
North Alabama	Receiving	Kobe Warden	3 receptions, 34 yards
Memphis	Passing	Seth Henigan	22/30, 308 yards, 2 TD
Memphis	Rushing	Mario Anderson Jr	10 carries, 46 yards, 2 TD
Memphis	Receiving	Roc Taylor	5 receptions, 87 yards

=== vs. No. 21 Illinois State ===
Game Three – No. 21 Illinois State Redbirds (0-1) vs North Alabama Lions (0-2) – Game summary

Quarter	1	2	3	4	Total
No. 21 Redbirds	7	7	10	0	24
Lions	3	0	7	7	17

at Braly Municipal Stadium • Florence, AL

- Date: Saturday September 7, 2024
- Game time: 6:00 PM CST
- Game weather: SE at 9 miles per hour (14 km/h) • Weather: Sunny • Temp: 81 °F (27 °C)
- Game attendance: 8,014
- Referee: Jeremee Tate
- TV announcers (ESPN+): Benjamin Ray and Bryan Neece

Game information

First quarter

- (11:17) ILST – Mitch Bartol 18-yard pass from Tommy Rittenhouse (Ian Wagner kick) (Drive: 7 plays, 75 yards, 3:39; ILST 7-0)
- (7:27) UNA – Scott Payne 25-yard field goal (Drive: 9 plays, 67 yards, 3:50; ILST 7-3)

Second quarter

- (11:42) ILST – Tommy Rittenhouse 3-yard rush (Ian Wagner kick) (Drive: 9 plays, 65 yards, 3:18; ILST 14-3)

Third quarter

- (6:17) UNA – Kobe Warden 15-yard pass from Ari Patu (Scott Payne kick) (Drive: 8 plays, 80 yards, 4:38; ILST 14-10)
- (6:00) ILST – Tommy Rittenhouse 71-yard rush (Ian Wagner kick) (Drive: 1 play, 71 yards, 0:10; ILST 21-10)
- (7:27) ILST – Ian Wagner 21-yard field goal (Drive: 13 plays, 83 yards, 4:48; ILST 24-10)

Fourth quarter

- (10:57) UNA – Ari Patu 7-yard rush (Scott Payne kick) (Drive: 4 play, 72 yards, 1:25; ILST 21-17)

Statistics	ILST	UNA
First downs	20	17
Total yards	478	411
Rushing yards	325	83
Passing yards	153	328
Passing: Comp–Att–Int	16-26-1	21-36-1
Time of possession	30:31	29:29

Team	Category	Player	Statistics
Illinois State	Passing	Tommy Rittenhouse	13/21, 142 yards, TD, INT
Illinois State	Rushing	Wenkers Wright	26 carries, 153 yards
Illinois State	Receiving	Dylan Ford	6 receptions, 52 yards
North Alabama	Passing	Ari Patu	21/36, 328 yards, TD, INT
North Alabama	Rushing	Jayvian Allen	14 carries, 63 yards
North Alabama	Receiving	Takairee Kenebrew	7 receptions, 129 yards

=== at UT Martin ===
Game Four – North Alabama Lions (0-3) at UT Martin Skyhawks (0-2) – Game summary

Quarter	1	2	3	4	Total
Lions	18	7	3	0	28
Skyhawks	10	10	16	7	43

at Graham Stadium • Martin, TN

- Date: Saturday September 14, 2024
- Game time: 6:00 p.m.
- Game weather: E at 6 miles per hour (9.7 km/h) • Weather: Cloudy • Temp: 71 °F (22 °C)
- Game attendance: 3,417
- Referee: Drew Myers
- TV announcers (ESPN+): Davis Gregory (play-by-play), John Halter, and Chris Brinkley (analysts)

Game information

First quarter

- (13:28) UNA – Takairee Kenebrew 78-yard pass from DC Tabscott (Nathan Curry pass from Ben Harris) (Drive: 3 plays, 80 yards, 1:27; UNA 8-0)
- (10:17) UNA – Takairee Kenebrew 8-yard pass from DC Tabscott (Scott Payne kick) (Drive: 4 plays, 54 yards, 1:40; UNA 15-0)
- (6:46) UNA – Scott Payne 45-yard field goal (Drive: 5 plays, 17 yards, 1:53; UNA 18-0)
- (1:51) UTM – Jaren Van Winkle 38-yard field goal (Drive: 6 plays, 75 yards, 2:28; UNA 18-3)
- (0:07) UTM – Trevonte Rucker 8-yard pass from Kinkead Dent (Jaren Van Winkle kick) (Drive: 2 plays, 8 yards, 0:27; UNA 18-10)

Second quarter

- (5:06) UTM – Patrick Smith 5-yard rush (Jaren Van Winkle kick) (Drive: 3 plays, 30 yards, 1:08; UNA 18-17)
- (1:19) UNA – Jayvian Allen 5-yard rush (Scott Payne kick) (Drive: 9 plays, 60 yards, 3:39; UNA 25-17)
- (0:00) UTM – Jaren Van Winkle 46-yard field goal (Drive: 8 plays, 46 yards, 1:19; UNA 25-20)

Third quarter

- (13:22) UTM – Jayvian Allen sacked for a safety (Drive: 1 play, 0 yards, 0:04; UNA 25-22)
- (10:24) UTM – Trevonte Rucker 10-yard pass from Kaiya Sheron (Jaren Van Winkle kick) (Drive: 6 plays, 53 yards, 2:50; UTM 29-25)
- (6:03) UNA – Scott Payne 23-yard field goal (Drive: 14 plays, 68 yards, 4:21; UTM 29-28)
- (2:08) UTM – Patrick Smith 1-yard rush (Jaren Van Winkle kick) (Drive: 7 plays, 75 yards, 3:55; UTM 36-28)

Fourth quarter

- (5:28) UTM – Tevin Shipp 34-yard interception return (Jaren Van Winkle kick) (Drive: 1 play, 0 yards, 0:14; UTM 43-28)

Statistics	UNA	UTM
First downs	16	21
Total yards	377	416
Rushing yards	122	193
Passing yards	255	223
Passing: Comp–Att–Int	14-33-3	18-35-2
Time of possession	27:48	32:!2

Team	Category	Player	Statistics
North Alabama	Passing	DC Tabscott	6/13, 149 yards, 2 TD, 2 INT
North Alabama	Rushing	Dennis Moody	6 carries, 53 yards
North Alabama	Receiving	Takairee Kenebrew	5 receptions, 173 yards, 2 TD
UT Martin	Passing	Kaiya Sheron	14/18, 170 yards, TD
UT Martin	Rushing	Patrick Smith	15 carries, 123 yards, 2 TD
UT Martin	Receiving	Trevonte Rucker	6 receptions, 83 yards, 2 TD

=== vs. No. 16 Tarleton State ===
Game Five – No. 16 Tarleton State Texans (2–1) vs North Alabama Lions (0–4) – Game summary

Quarter	1	2	3	4	Total
No. 16 Texans	0	7	14	7	28
Lions	3	3	8	0	14

at Braly Stadium • Florence, AL

- Date: Saturday September 21, 2024
- Game time: 6:00 PM CST
- Game weather: SE at 4 miles per hour (6.4 km/h) • Weather: Cloudy • Temp: 89 °F (32 °C)
- Game attendance: 7,432
- Referee: Gabriel Tomlin
- TV announcers (ESPN+): Benjamin Ray (play-by-play) and Bryan Neece (analyst)

Game information

First quarter

- (7:57) UNA – Scott Payne 20-yard field goal (Drive: 13 plays, 72 yards, 7:03; UNA 3-0)

Second quarter

- (9:05) TAR – Kayvon Britten 96-yard rush (Adrian Guzman kick) (Drive: 1 play, 96 yards, 0:11; TAR 7-3)
- (0:14) UNA – Scott Payne 22-yard field goal (Drive: 14 plays, 72 yards, 5:28; TAR 7-6)

Third quarter

- (10:10) TAR – Kayvon Britten 2-yard rush (Adrian Guzman kick) (Drive: 5 plays, 19 yards, 2:48; TAR 14-6)
- (6:42) UNA – Jayvian Allen 10-yard rush (Ben Harris pass to Kaleb Heatherly) (Drive: 9 plays, 75 yards, 3:28; Tie 14-14)
- (5:57) TAR – Kayvon Britten 65-yard rush (Adrian Guzman kick) (Drive: 2 plays, 71 yards, 0:39; TAR 21-14)

Fourth quarter

- (3:22) TAR – Kayvon Britten 9-yard rush (Adrian Guzman kick) (Drive: 8 plays, 80 yards, 4:51; TAR 28-14)

Statistics	TAR	UNA
First downs	10	24
Total yards	334	385
Rushing yards	284	189
Passing yards	50	196
Passing: Comp–Att–Int	6-13	20-35-1
Time of possession	22:08	37:52

Team	Category	Player	Statistics
Tarleton State	Passing	Victor Gabalis	6/13, 50 yards
Tarleton State	Rushing	Kayvon Britten	21 carries, 273 yards, 4 TD
Tarleton State	Receiving	Darius Cooper	2 receptions, 33 yards
North Alabama	Passing	Ben Harris	7/12, 100 yards, 1 INT
North Alabama	Rushing	TJ Smith	14 carries, 72 yards
North Alabama	Receiving	Dakota Warfield	6 receptions, 91 yards

=== at West Georgia ===
Game Six – North Alabama Lions (0–5) at West Georgia Wolves (1–2) – Game summary

Quarter	1	2	3	4	Total
Lions	3	10	7	5	25
Wolves	0	13	0	3	16

at University Stadium • Carrollton, GA

- Date: Saturday September 28, 2024
- Game time: 1:00 p.m.
- Game weather: SW at 8 miles per hour (13 km/h) • Weather: Cloudy • Temp: 70 °F (21 °C)
- Referee: Zach Erdmann
- TV announcers (ESPN+): Logan Maddox (play-by-play), Parker Gore (analyst), and Carlie Pair (sideline)

Game information

First quarter

- (7:57) UNA – Scott Payne 24-yard field goal (Drive: 13 plays, 58 yards, 6:11; UNA 3-0)

Second quarter

- (9:52) UWG – Davin Wydner 1-yard rush (2-point conversion no good) (Drive: 5 plays, 83 yards, 1:45; UWG 6-3)
- (5:34) UNA – Scott Payne 27-yard field goal (Drive: 6 plays, 37 yards, 2:46; Tie 6-6)
- (2:08) UWG – Davin Wydner 12-yard rush (Chance Gagnon kick) (Drive: 8 plays, 70 yards, 3:20; UWG 13-6)
- (0:04) UNA – Takairee Kenebrew 2-yard pass from TJ Smith (Scott Payne kick) (Drive: 12 plays, 75 yards, 2:04; Tie 13-13)

Third quarter

- (0:42) UNA – Dakota Warfield 4-yard pass from TJ Smith (Scott Payne kick) (Drive: 13 plays, 56 yards, 5:33; UNA 20-13)

Fourth quarter

- (7:47) UNA – Scott Payne 30-yard field goal (Drive: 9 plays, 42 yards, 5:58; UNA 23-13)
- (1:52) UWG – Chance Gagnon 32-yard field goal (Drive: 6 plays, 30 yards, 1:29; UNA 23-16)
- (0:37) UNA – Davin Wynder sacked for a safety (Drive: 1 play; UNA 25-16)

Statistics	UNA	UWG
First downs	21	16
Total yards	354	223
Rushing yards	170	80
Passing yards	184	143
Passing: Comp–Att–Int	18-29-0	10-18-0
Time of possession	43:16	16:44

Team	Category	Player	Statistics
North Alabama	Passing	TJ Smith	18/29, 184 yards, 2 TD
North Alabama	Rushing	Dennis Moody	12 carries, 54 yards
North Alabama	Receiving	Dakota Warfield	5 receptions, 51 yards, 1 TD
West Georgia	Passing	Davin Wydner	10/17, 143 yards
West Georgia	Rushing	Rajaez Mosley	9 carries, 66 yards
West Georgia	Receiving	Chase Belcher	2 receptions, 75 yards

=== vs. Utah Tech ===
Game Seven – Utah Tech Trailblazers (0–5) at North Alabama Lions (1–5) – Game summary

Quarter	1	2	3	4	Total
Trailblazers	0	0	0	14	14
Lions	18	21	14	7	60

at Braly Municipal Stadium, Florence, AL

- Date: Saturday October 5, 2024
- Game time: 4:00 p.m.
- Game weather: SW at 4 miles per hour (6.4 km/h) • Weather: Sunny • Temp: 88 °F (31 °C)
- Game attendance: 6,875
- Referee: Michael Franin
- TV announcers (ESPN+): Benjamin Ray (play-by-play) and Bryan Neece (analyst)

Game information

First quarter

- (12:36) UNA – Jayvian Allen 4-yard rush (Scott Payne kick) (Drive: 7 plays, 75 yards, 2:24; UNA 7-0)
- (8:10) UNA – Scott Payne 37-yard kick (Drive: 6 plays, 30 yards, 3:03; UNA 10-0)
- (4:03) UNA – Kaleb Heatherly 8-yard pass from TJ Smith (Marlon Krakue pass) (Drive: 6 plays, 47 yards, 2:39; UNA 18-0)

Second quarter

- (12:46) UNA – Dakota Warfield 23-yard pass from TJ Smith (Scott Payne kick) (Drive: 1 plays, 23 yards, 0:06; UNA 25-0)
- (9:43) UNA – Jyheam Ingram 40-yard fumble recovery (Scott Payne kick) (UNA 32-0)
- (8:14) UNA – Jayvian Allen 19-yard pass from TJ Smith (Scott Payne kick) (Drive: 3 plays, 24 yards, 1:23; UNA 39-0)

Third quarter

- (13:56) UNA – Jalen Fletcher 55-yard pass from TJ Smith (Scott Payne kick) (Drive: 1 play, 55 yards, 0:10; UNA 46-0)
- (6:44) UNA – TJ Smith 2-yard rush (Scott Payne kick) (Drive: 9 plays, 79 yards, 5:24; UNA 53-0)

Fourth quarter

- (14:17) UNA – Ben Harris 1-yard rush (Scott Payne kick) (Drive: 10 plays, 75 yards, 6:04; UNA 60-0)
- (11:52) UTU – Alec Burton 39-yard pass from Bronson Barben (Ilya Uvaydov kick) (Drive: 7 plays, 75 yards, 2:25; UNA 60-7)
- (9:12) UTU – Bryce Parker 75-yard pass from Bronson Barben (Ilya Uvaydov kick) (Drive: 1 play, 75 yards, 0:12; UNA 60-14)

Statistics	UTU	UNA
First downs	13	27
Total yards	240	501
Rushing yards	10	257
Passing yards	230	244
Passing: Comp–Att–Int	15–30–1	14–20–0
Time of possession	22:13	37:47

Team	Category	Player	Statistics
Utah Tech	Passing	Bronson Barben	5/8, 137 yards, 2 TD
Utah Tech	Rushing	Bretton Stone	4 carries, 28 yards
Utah Tech	Receiving	Bryce Parker	3 receptions, 98 yards, 1 TD
North Alabama	Passing	TJ Smith	13/17, 207 yards, 4 TD
North Alabama	Rushing	Jalen Fletcher	9 carries, 73 yards
North Alabama	Receiving	Takairee Kenebrew	5 receptions, 75 yards

=== vs. No. 10 Abilene Christian ===
Game Eight – No. 10 Abilene Christian Wildcats (4-2) at North Alabama Lions (2-5) – Game summary

Quarter	1	2	3	4	Total
No. 10 Wildcats	14	13	7	0	34
Lions	20	0	13	14	47

at Braly Municipal Stadium, Florence, AL

- Date: Saturday October 12, 2024
- Game time: 6:00 p.m.
- Game weather: NE at 3 miles per hour (4.8 km/h) • Weather: Sunny • Temp: 81 °F (27 °C)
- Game attendance: 9,918
- Referee: Branden McCain
- TV announcers (ESPN+): Benjamin Ray (play-by-play) and Bryan Neece (analyst)

Game information

First quarter

- (14:15) UNA – TJ Smith 1-yard rush (2-point conversion no good) (Drive: 2 plays, 6 yards, 0:39; UNA 6-0)
- (10:06) UNA – Tanaka Scott 23-yard pass from TJ Smith (Scott Payne kick) (Drive: 3 plays, 37 yards, 1:21; UNA 13-0)
- (8:52) ACU – Isaiah Johnson 60-yard rush (Ritse Vaes kick) (Drive: 4 plays, 75 yards, 1:14; UNA 13-7)
- (4:22) ACU – Blayne Taylor 16-yard pass from Maverick McIvor (Ritse Vaes kick) (Drive: 7 plays, 52 yards, 2:58; ACU 14-13)
- (2:19) UNA – TJ Smith 46-yard rush (Scott Payne kick) (Drive: 4 plays, 85 yards, 1:58; UNA 20-14)

Second quarter

- (7:21) ACU – Sam Hicks 4-yard rush (Ritse Vaes kick blocked by Edwin White-Schultz) (Drive: 6 plays, 28 yards, 2:33; Tie 20-20)
- (1:39) ACU – Sam Hicks 38-yard rush (Ritse Vaes kick) (Drive: 8 plays, 85 yards, 2:46; ACU 27-20)

Third quarter

- (14:09) UNA – Justin Luke 23-yard pass from TJ Smith (Scott Payne kick blocked by Kaghen Roach) (Drive: 3 plays, 75 yards, 0:51; ACU 27-26)
- (12:23) ACU – Isaiah Johnson 1-yard rush (Ritse Vaes kick) (Drive: 4 plays, 41 yards, 1:35; ACU 34-26)
- (2:07) UNA – Kobe Warden 37-yard pass from TJ Smith (Scott Payne kick) (Drive: 5 plays, 72 yards, 2:04; ACU 34-33)

Fourth quarter

- (11:36) UNA – Jalen Fletcher 24-yard rush (Scott Payne kick) (Drive: 8 plays, 88 yards, 3:27; UNA 40-34)
- (1:51) UNA – Kobe Warden 8-yard pass from TJ Smith (Scott Payne kick) (Drive: 9 plays, 94 yards, 4:53; UNA 47-34)

Statistics	ACU	UNA
First downs	26	22
Total yards	468	506
Rushing yards	193	286
Passing yards	275	220
Passing: Comp–Att–Int	30-48-1	17-24-1
Time of possession	31:38	28:22

Team	Category	Player	Statistics
Abilene Christian	Passing	Maverick McIvor	30/48, 275 yards, 1 TD, 1 INT
Abilene Christian	Rushing	Sam Hicks	13 carries, 99 yards, 2 TD
Abilene Christian	Receiving	Nehemiah Martinez I	13 receptions, 93 yards
North Alabama	Passing	TJ Smith	17/24, 220 yards, 4 TD, 1 INT
North Alabama	Rushing	Jalen Fletcher	10 carries, 123 yards, 1 TD
North Alabama	Receiving	Kobe Warden	9 receptions, 112 yards, 2 TD

The Lions' victory over the #10 Wildcats marked the program's first-ever win over a ranked Division I team. This also served as their first win over a ranked team at any level since 2018 when the Lions beat Division II #24 Azusa Pacific.

=== at No. 12 Central Arkansas ===
Game Nine – North Alabama Lions (3–5) at No. 12 Central Arkansas Bears (5–2) – Game summary

Quarter	1	2	3	4	Total
Lions	0	13	0	6	19
No. 12 Bears	3	7	7	7	24

at Estes Stadium • Conway, AR

- Date: Saturday October 26, 2024
- Game time: 4:00 p.m.
- Game weather: Sunny
- Game attendance: 8,794
- Referee: Matthew Jones
- TV announcers (ESPN+): J.B. Brazeal (play-by-play) and Wess Moore (analyst)

Game information

First quarter

- (2:56) UCA – Jake Gaster 30-yard kick (Drive: 7 plays, 60 yards, 2:33; UCA 3-0)

Second quarter

- (12:18) UCA – Jordan Owens 33-yard pass from Will McElvain (Jake Gaster kick) (Drive: 5 plays, 72 yards, 1:52; UCA 10-0)
- (11:22) UNA – Jalen Fletcher 8-yard rush (Scott Payne kick) (Drive: 2 plays, 12 yards, 0:44; UCA 10-7)
- (5:02) UNA – Tanaka Scott 11-yard pass from TJ Smith (2-point conversion no good) (Drive: 10 plays, 79 yards, 4:21; UNA 13-10)

Third quarter

- (11:35) UCA – Malachi Henry 21-yard pass from Will McElvain (Jake Gaster kick) (Drive: 8 plays, 75 yards, 3:25; UCA 17-13)

Fourth quarter

- (13:47) UCA – Malachi Henry 69-yard pass from Will McElvain (Jake Gaster kick) (Drive: 2 plays, 75 yards, 0:45; UCA 24-13)
- (2:56) UNA – TJ Smith 1-yard rush (2-point conversion no good) (Drive: 12 plays, 80 yards, 3:37; UCA 24-19)

Statistics	UNA	UCA
First downs	24	15
Total yards	353	306
Rushing yards	107	56
Passing yards	246	250
Passing: Comp–Att–Int	17–34–2	21–31–0
Time of possession	30:01	29:59

Team	Category	Player	Statistics
North Alabama	Passing	TJ Smith	14/31, 191 yards, 1 TD, 2 INT
North Alabama	Rushing	Jayvian Allen	12 carries, 65 yards
North Alabama	Receiving	Dakota Warfield	6 receptions, 80 yards
Central Arkansas	Passing	Will McElvain	21/31, 250 yards, 3 TD
Central Arkansas	Rushing	ShunDerrick Powell	14 carries, 70 yards
Central Arkansas	Receiving	Malachi Henry	2 receptions, 90 yards, 2 TD

=== vs Austin Peay ===
Game Ten – Austin Peay Governors (3–5) vs North Alabama Lions (3–6) – Game summary

Quarter	1	2	3	4	Total
Governors	10	14	0	7	31
Lions	0	3	14	0	17

at Braly Stadium • Florence, AL

- Date: Saturday November 2, 2024
- Game time: 4:00 p.m.
- Game weather: SW at 4 miles per hour (6.4 km/h) • Weather: Cloudy • Temp: 73 °F (23 °C)
- Game attendance: 7,286
- Referee: John Kellermeier
- TV announcers (ESPN+): Benjamin Ray (play-by-play) and Bryan Neece (analyst)

Game information

First quarter

- (10:50) APSU – Carson Smith 37-yard field goal (Drive: 6 plays, 50 yards, 2:59; APSU 3-0)
- (3:56) APSU – Jaden Barnes 57-yard pass from Austin Smith (Carson Smith kick) (Drive: 7 plays, 80 yards, 2:59; APSU 10-0)

Second quarter

- (13:24) APSU – Jaden Barnes 31-yard pass from Austin Smith (Carson Smith kick) (Drive: 7 plays, 78 yards, 3:37; APSU 17-0)
- (8:17) UNA – Scott Payne 42-yard field goal (Drive: 11 plays, 50 yards, 5:07; APSU 17-3)
- (1:16) APSU – Ramon Copeland Jr 14-yard pass from Austin Smith (Carson Smith kick) (Drive: 12 plays, 75 yards, 7:01; APSU 24-3)

Third quarter

- (13:25) UNA – TJ Smith 14-yard run (Scott Payne kick) (Drive: 4 plays, 54 yards, 1:27; APSU 24-10)
- (5:40) UNA – Ben Harris 19-yard pass from TJ Smith (Scott Payne kick) (Drive: 7 plays, 73 yards, 3:44; APSU 24-17)

Fourth quarter

- (7:21) APSU – Jaden Barnes 49-yard pass from Austin Smith (Carson Smith kick) (Drive: 3 plays, 71 yards, 1:12; APSU 31-17)

Statistics	APSU	UNA
First downs	26	20
Total yards	528	394
Rushing yards	122	116
Passing yards	406	278
Passing: Comp–Att–Int	31-35-1	25-39-1
Time of possession	33:48	26:12

Team	Category	Player	Statistics
Austin Peay	Passing	Austin Smith	31/35, 406 yards, 4 TD, 1 INT
Austin Peay	Rushing	La'Vell Wright	14 carries, 61 yards
Austin Peay	Receiving	Jaden Barnes	12 receptions, 241 yards, 3 TD
North Alabama	Passing	TJ Smith	25/39, 278 yards, 1 TD, 1 INT
North Alabama	Rushing	Jayvian Allen	10 carries, 62 yards
North Alabama	Receiving	Dakota Warfield	7 receptions, 84 yards

=== at Southern Utah ===
Game Eleven – North Alabama Lions (3–7) at Southern Utah Thunderbirds (4–5) – Game summary

Quarter	1	2	3	4	Total
Lions	0	7	19	0	26
Thunderbirds	7	14	10	7	38

at Eccles Coliseum • Cedar City, UT

- Date: Saturday November 9, 2024
- Game time: 2:00 p.m.
- Game weather: Sunny • Temperature: 49 °F (9 °C) • Wind: SE 3 miles per hour (4.8 km/h)
- Game attendance: 3,042
- Referee: Michael Lennie
- TV announcers (ESPN+): Spencer McLaughlin (play-by-play), Dallin Richards (analyst) and Kendall McGuire (sideline)

Game information

First quarter

- (4:01) SUU – Targhee Lambson 18-yard run, Jayden Rogers kick (Drive: 13 plays, 84 yards, 7:27; Southern Utah 7–0)

Second quarter

- (11:08) SUU – Targhee Lambson 1-yard run, Jayden Rogers kick (Drive: 12 plays, 72 yards, 6:49; Southern Utah 14–0)
- (1:56) SUU – Targhee Lambson 2-yard run, Jayden Rogers kick (Drive: 9 plays, 79 yards, 4:30; Southern Utah 21–0)
- (1:17) UNA – Dakota Warfield 22-yard pass from TJ Smith, Scott Payne kick (Drive: 2 plays, 78 yards, 0:32; Southern Utah 21–7)

Third quarter

- (7:42) SUU – Jayden Rogers 50-yard field goal (Drive: 9 plays, 42 yards, 4:20; Southern Utah 24–7)
- (6:58) UNA – Justin Lake 70-yard pass from TJ Smith (Drive: 2 plays, 75 yards, 0:44; Southern Utah 24–13)
- (5:33) SUU – Shane Carr 33-yard pass from Jackson Berry, Jayden Rogers kick (Drive: 4 plays, 60 yards, 1:25; Southern Utah 31–13)
- (5:24) UNA – Takairee Kenebrew 75-yard pass from TJ Smith (Drive: 1 play, 75 yards, 0:09; Southern Utah 31–19)
- (0:40) UNA – Jayvian Allen 3-yard run, Scott Payne kick (Drive: 5 plays, 82 yards, 1:32; Southern Utah 31–26)

Fourth quarter

- (10:51) SUU – Kameron Rocha 48-yard interception, Jayden Rogers kick (Southern Utah 38–26)

Statistics	UNA	SUU
First downs	18	23
Total yards	487	407
Rushing yards	35	177
Passing yards	452	230
Passing: Comp–Att–Int	21–34–2	21–31–0
Time of possession	20:32	39:28

Team	Category	Player	Statistics
North Alabama	Passing	TJ Smith	21/34, 452 yards, 3 TD, 2 INT
North Alabama	Rushing	TJ Smith	7 carries, 31 yards
North Alabama	Receiving	Takairee Kenebrew	5 receptions, 187 yards, TD
Southern Utah	Passing	Jackson Berry	21/31, 230 yards, TD
Southern Utah	Rushing	Targhee Lambson	31 carries, 165 yards, 3 TD
Southern Utah	Receiving	Gabe Nunez	7 receptions, 94 yards

=== at No. 25 Eastern Kentucky ===
Game Twelve – North Alabama Lions (3–8) at No. 25 Eastern Kentucky Colonels (7–4) – Game summary

Quarter	1	2	3	4	Total
Lions	0	0	8	7	15
No. 25 Colonels	0	14	0	7	21

at Roy Kidd Stadium • Richmond, KY

- Date: Saturday November 23, 2024
- Game time: 1:00 p.m.
- Game weather: W at 7 miles per hour (11 km/h) • Weather: Cloudy • Temp: 42 °F (6 °C)
- Game attendance: 4,226
- Referee: Zach Erdmann
- TV announcers (ESPN+): Greg Stotelymyer (play-by-play), Wes Chandler and Jim Tirey (analysts)

Game information

Second quarter

- (9:36) EKU – Matt Morrissey 2-yard run (Patrick Nations kick) (Drive: 10 plays, 91 yards, 5:07; EKU 7-0)
- (0:34) EKU – Brayden Latham 2-yard run (Patrick Nations kick) (Drive: 16 plays, 98 yards, 6:25; EKU 14-0)

Third quarter

- (3:38) UNA – Tanaka Scott 24-yard pass from TJ Smith (Jayvian Allen rush) (Drive: 12 plays, 88 yards, 7:34; EKU 14-7)

Fourth quarter

- (10:37) UNA – TJ Smith 18-yard rush (Scott Payne kick) (Drive: 11 plays, 83 yards, 4:52; UNA 15-14)
- (8:10) EKU – Marcus Calwise Jr 67-yard pass from Matt Morrissey (Patrick Nations kick) (Drive: 4 plays, 79 yards, 2:18; EKU 21-15)

Statistics	UNA	EKU
First downs	26	16
Total yards	441	395
Rushing yards	116	241
Passing yards	325	154
Passing: Comp–Att–Int	23-39-2	9-15-1
Time of possession	31:55	28:05

Team	Category	Player	Statistics
North Alabama	Passing	TJ Smith	23/39, 325 yards, 1 TD, 2 INT
North Alabama	Rushing	Jayvian Allen	17 carries, 79 yards
North Alabama	Receiving	Tanaka Scott	6 receptions, 109 yards, 1 TD
Eastern Kentucky	Passing	Matt Morrissey	9/15, 154 yards, 1 TD, 1 INT
Eastern Kentucky	Rushing	Brayden Latham	19 carries, 103 yards, 1 TD
Eastern Kentucky	Receiving	Marcus Calwise Jr	5 receptions, 99 yards, 1 TD

== Roster ==
2024 North Alabama Lions football team roster
Players
Coaches
Offense

Pos.	#	Name	Class
WR	0	Dakota Warfield	Sr
QB	1	Ari Patu	GS
QB	2	TJ Smith	Sr
WR	3	JJ Evans	Sr
WR	4	Tanaka Scott	Jr
WR	5	Takairee Kenebrew	GS
RB	6	Jayvian Allen	Jr
QB	7	Ben Harris	Jr
WR	8	Justin Luke	Jr
WR	9	Logan Collier	GS
RB	10	Dennis Moody	So
RB	11	Jalyn Daniels	Jr
QB	12	Ty Watkins	Fr
WR	13	Azariah Fletcher	Fr
WR	14	Kobe Warden	Sr
QB	17	DC Tabscott	Jr
WR	18	KJ Fields	So
WR	23	Kaden Cooper	So
RB	28	Jalen Fletcher	Fr
RB	32	Roderick Taylor Jr.	Fr
RB	34	Travelle Anderson	So
RB	38	Nic Strong	Fr
TE	40	Doug Myers	So
OL	51	Ryan Walker	Fr
OL	52	Reece Mims	Fr
OL	58	Eli Long	Fr
OL	59	Jon Lawrence	Fr
OL	60	Shane McNatt	Fr
OL	62	Carson Wheeler	Fr
OL	63	Brody Stewart	Fr
OL	64	Dominic Braesch	Fr
OL	65	Collin Wright	So
OL	66	M.J. Williams	Fr
OL	69	Hayden Edge	Fr
OL	71	La'Charles Taylor	Jr
OL	72	Witt Mitchum	Jr
OL	74	Gage Saint	Jr
OL	75	Jayme Motley-Simmons	Jr
OL	76	Anthony Faiivae	So
OL	77	Mickel Clay	Sr
OL	78	Anthony Bauer	Sr
OL	79	Raykwon Goldthwaite	So
WR	80	Daniel Cooper	Fr
WR	81	Myron Dunklin	Fr
WR	82	Clint Houser	Fr
WR	83	Nikki Taylor	So
WR	84	Omareon Finch	Fr
WR	85	Noah Gregg	Fr
TE	86	Amarie Rodgers	Fr
TE	87	Nathan Brockway	So
TE	88	Kaleb Heatherly	Jr
TE	89	Braden Forscutt	Fr
TE		Ryan Adams	Fr
OL		Trace Allen	Fr
RB		Micah Christensen	Fr
RB		Ethan Cunningham	Fr
RB		Cade Mansmann	So
QB		Kesean Pryor	Fr
TE		Korion Pryor	Fr
QB		Dawson Simmons	Fr
RB		Logan Thornton	Fr
FB		Kylan Williams	So

Defense

Pos.	#	Name	Class
DL	0	Kam'ron Green	Sr
DB	1	Edwin White Schultz	Jr
LB	2	Jackson Bratton	Sr
DB	3	Jermaine Ray Jr.	Jr
LB	4	Rush Lansdell	Sr
DB	5	Ryan Madison	Jr
DB	6	Travis Collier	Jr
DB	7	Philjae Bien-Aime	GS
LB	8	Shaun Myers	Sr
DB	9	Gregory Reddick	Sr
LB	10	Garrick Ponder	So
DB	12	Christopher Burnett	Jr
DL	15	Marlon Krakue	Sr
DB	16	Jahbari Hill	Jr
LB	19	Josh Anglin	Fr
DB	20	A.J. Seay	Jr
DB	21	Ashaad Williams	Jr
LB	22	A.J. Phillips	Sr
DB	24	Cameron Jamar	Jr
DB	25	Caleb McDougle	GS
DB	26	Michael Jordan Jr.	Jr
DB	27	Camden Allison	So
DB	29	Ike Rowell	Jr
DB	30	Leo Glover	Fr
DB	31	John Taylor	Fr
DL	33	E.J. Colbert	Jr
DB	39	Josiah Hixon	Fr
DL	41	Walter Goggins	Fr
DL	42	Jackson Ward	Fr
DL	43	Kingston Lowe	Fr
DL	44	Jyheam Ingram	So
DL	45	Tyrik Daniels	Jr
LB	46	Chris Cotton	Fr
LB	48	Seth Hampton	So
DE	49	Avery Howard	So
DL	50	Grant Wisdom	Sr
LB	52	Kendrick Davis	Fr
DL	55	Rayqwon Smith	Fr
DL	57	Fred Vili	Fr
DB	81	Noah Fuller	Jr
DE	90	Zacchaeus Dixon	So
DT	91	Jake McCluskey	So
DL	94	Jalin Edwards	Fr
DL	99	Kaleb Brown	Jr
DL		Jaden Edwards	Jr
DB		Kemon Folse	Fr
DB		Drake Fowler	Fr
DL		Matt Heard	Fr
DB		Magnum Henderson	Fr
LB		Jake McDonald	Fr
DB		Alex McLeod	Fr
LB		Aidan Robinson	Jr
DB		Barry Womack	GS
DB		Anthony Young	Fr

Special teams

Pos.	#	Name	Class
P	35	Adam Watford	So
K	36	Scott Payne	GS
K	37	Sam Contorno	Sr
LS	47	Nathan Curry	So
LS	53	Evan Godwin	So
K, P	54	Jack Rice	So
K	92	Nathan Ogletree	So
K		Zach Aird	So

Head coach

- Brent Dearmon – Quarterbacks

Coordinators/assistant coaches

- Brock Caraboa – Assistant head coach/defensive coordinator
- Kevin Wewers – Offensive coordinator/tight ends
- Morgan Cruce – Running backs/director of football operations
- Samie Parker – Wide receivers
- Richard Hutchings – Offensive line
- Thomas Johnston – Defensive line
- Deshaun Davis – Linebackers
- De'Von Lockett – Defensive backs
- Luke Roth – Special teams coordinator/nickels
- Bret Peterson – Offensive analyst
- Kyle Persons – Defensive analyst
- Kerryon Johnson – Director of player development
- Ben Hamner – Director of player personnel

Legend

- (C) Team captain
- (S) Suspended
- (I) Ineligible
- Injured
- Redshirt

Roster
Last update: October 17, 2024

== Awards ==
=== Watchlists ===
Award	Player
Jerry Rice Award	Josh Anglin; Jalen Flechter

=== Player honors ===
Weekly Honors
Player	Award	Ref.
Jalen Flechter	UAC Freshman of the Week (Week Zero); UAC Freshman of the Week (Week Six); UAC Freshman of the Week (Week Seven); Stats Perform FCS Freshman of the Week finalist (Week Seven)	
Gregory Reddick	UAC Co-Defensive Player of the Week (Week Zero); UAC Co-Defensive Player of the Week (Week Seven)	
Fred Vili	UAC Freshman of the Week (Week One)	
Josh Anglin	UAC Freshman of the Week (Week Two); UAC Freshman of the Week (Week Three); UAC Freshman of the Week (Week Eleven); Jerry Rice Award finalist	
Scott Payne	UAC Specialist of the Week (Week Five)	
TJ Smith	UAC Offensive Player of the Week (Week Seven); FCS Player of the Week (Week Seven)	
Brent Dearmon	Our Coaching Staff FCS National Coach of the Week (Week Seven)	
Justin Luke	UAC Specialist of the Week (Week Nine)	

=== Team honors ===
Weekly Honors
Award	Ref.
Stats Perform FCS National Team of the Week (Week 7)	

== Statistics ==
=== Team ===
	North Alabama	Opp
Scoring	283	350
Points per Game	23.58	29.17
First downs	243	220
Rushing	94	91
Passing	124	109
Penalty	25	20
Rushing yards	1763	1913
Avg per play	4.0	4.6
Avg per game	146.9	159.4
Rushing touchdowns	16	26
Passing yards	2951	2599
Att-Comp-Int	375-219-17	343-223-7
Avg per pass	7.87	7.58
Avg per catch	13.47	11.65
Avg per game	245.92	216.58
Passing touchdowns	19	18
Total offense	4714	4512
Plays	816	757
Avg per play	5.8	6.0
Avg per game	392.8	376.0
Fumbles-Lost	19-8	14-6
Penalties-Yards	71-606	83-737
Avg per game	50.50	61.42

	North Alabama	Opp
Punt-Yards	51-2100	63-2657
Avg per play	41.18	42.17
Avg per punt net	38.37	38.89
Punt Return-Yards	17-147	8-83
Avg per punt return	8.65	10.38
Kickoffs-Yards	58-3329	66-4129
Avg per kick	57.40	62.56
Avg per kick net	41.79	44.91
Kickoff Return-Yards	25-545	24-505
Avg per kickoff return	21.80	21.04
Interceptions-Yards	7-76	17-186
Avg per play	10.86	10.94
Time of possession / game	30:47	29:13
3rd Down Conversions (Pct%)	59-163 (36.20%)	63-157 (40.13%)
4th Down Conversions (Pct%)	12-26 (46.15 %)	4-9 (44.44%)
Touchdowns Scored	36	46
Field Goals-Attempts	10-15	10-15
PAT-Attempts	25-27	40-42
Sack by Yards	24-197	23-185
Misc Yards	0	55
Onside kicks	1-1	0-2
Red zone scores	33-43	35-40
Red zone touchdowns	24-43	28-40
Attendance	39,525	53,643
Date/Avg per date	5-7,905	7-7,663

=== Individual leaders ===
==== Offense ====
Passing statistics
#	NAME	POS	RAT	CMP-ATT-INT	YDS	AVG/G	CMP%	TD	LONG
2	TJ Smith	QB	147.57	147-238-8	1993 yrds	166.08	61.76%	16 TDs	75
1	Ari Patu	QB	100.28	48-86-5	535 yrds	178.33	55.81%	1 TD	47
7	Ben Harris	QB	97.41	18-38-2	274 yrds	24.91	47.37%	0 TDs	37
17	DC Tabscott	QB	162.43	6-13-2	149 yrds	74.50	46.15%	2 TDs	78
	TOTALS		132.16	219-375-17	2951 yrds	245.92	58.40%	19 TDs	78

Rushing statistics
#	NAME	POS	ATT	GAIN	AVG	TD	LONG	AVG/G
		RB	0	0 yrds	0.0	0 TDs	0	0.0
	TOTALS		0	0 yrds	0.0	0 TDs	0	0.0

Receiving statistics
#	NAME	POS	CTH	YDS	AVG	TD	LONG	AVG/G
		WR	0	0 yrds	0.0	0 TDs	0	0.0
	TOTALS		0	0 yrds	0.0	0 TDs	0	0.0

==== Defense ====
Defense statistics
#	NAME	POS	SOLO	AST	TOT	TFL-YDS	SACK-YDS	INT-YDS-TD	BU	QBH	RCV-YDS	FF	BLK	SAF
			0	0	0	0-0 yrds	0-0 yrds	-	-	-	-	-	-	-
	TOTAL		0	0	0	0-0 yrds	0-0 yrds	0-0 yrds- 0 TDs	0	0	-	0	0	-

Key: POS: Position, SOLO: Solo Tackles, AST: Assisted Tackles, TOT: Total Tackles, TFL: Tackles-for-loss, SACK: Quarterback Sacks, INT: Interceptions, BU: Passes Broken Up, PD: Passes Defended, QBH: Quarterback Hits, FR: Fumbles Recovered, FF: Forced Fumbles, BLK: Kicks or Punts Blocked, SAF: Safeties, TD : Touchdown

==== Special teams ====
Kicking/off statistics
#	NAME	POS	XPM-XPA (XP%)	FGM-FGA (FG%)	1–19	20–29	30–39	40–49	50+	PTS	LNG	KICKS	YDS	AVG	TB	OB
		PK	0-0 (0.0%)	0-0 (0.0%)	-/-	-/-	-/-	-/-	-/-	0 pts	0	0	0 yrds	0.0	0	-
	TOTALS		0-0 (0.0%)	0-0 (0.0%)	-/-	-/-	-/-	-/-	-/-	0	0	0	0 yrds	0.0	0	-

Punting statistics
#	NAME	POS	PUNTS	YDS	AVG	LONG	TB	FC	I–20	50+	BLK
		P	-	-	-	-	-	-	-	-	-
	Team	--	0	-	-	-	-	-	-	-	0
	TOTALS		0	0 yrds	0.0	0	0	0	0	0	0

Kick return statistics
#	NAME	POS	RTNS	YDS	AVG	TD	LNG
			-	-	-	-	-
	TOTALS		0	0 yrds	0.0	0 TD's	0

Punt return statistics
#	NAME	POS	RTNS	YDS	AVG	TD	LONG
			-	-	-	-	-
	TOTALS		0	0 yrds	0.0	0 TD's	0

== Media Affiliates ==
=== Radio ===
- Florence - WLX (98.3/103.5)

=== TV ===
- ESPN Family – ESPN, ESPN+

=== TV ratings ===
Opponent	Outlet	Viewers
Southeast Missouri State	ESPN	627,000
at Memphis	ESPN+	†
No. 21 Illinois State	ESPN+	†

All totals via Sports Media Watch. Streaming numbers not included. † - Data not available.
