= Wilson High School =

Wilson High School may refer to:

In the United States:

- Wilson Classical High School, Long Beach, California
- Wilson High School (Alabama), a public K-12 school in Lauderdale County, Alabama
- Wilson High School (Oklahoma), a public high school in Wilson, Oklahoma
- Wilson High School (Pennsylvania), a public high school in West Lawn, Pennsylvania
- Wilson High School (South Carolina), a public high school in Florence, South Carolina
- Wilson High School (New York), a public high school in Wilson, New York
- Wilson High School (California), an alternative high school in Santa Clara, California
- Glen A. Wilson High School, Hacienda Heights, California
- Joseph C. Wilson Magnet High School, Rochester, New York

== See also ==
- Wilson School (disambiguation)
- Woodrow Wilson High School (disambiguation)
- Woodrow Wilson Junior High School (disambiguation)
