= Wilson School =

Wilson School may refer to:

- The Princeton School of Public and International Affairs, formerly the Woodrow Wilson School of Public and International Affairs, at Princeton University, Princeton, New Jersey

or it may refer to:

also in the United States

(by state)

- Wilson High School, also known as Wilson School, in Lauderdale County, Alabama
- Woodrow Wilson Middle School (Terre Haute, Indiana), listed on the NRHP in Indiana
- Wilson School (Clear Spring, Maryland), listed on the National Register of Historic Places in Maryland
- The Wilson School (St. Louis, Missouri), an Independent School and member of NAIS and ISACS
- Woodrow Wilson School (Fargo, North Dakota), listed on the NRHP in North Dakota
- Wilson School (Henryetta, Oklahoma), listed on the NRHP in Oklahoma
- Woodrow Wilson Junior High School (Eugene, Oregon), listed on the NRHP in Oregon
- Castor Gardens Middle School, formerly Woodrow Wilson Junior High School, in listed on the NRHP in Pennsylvania
- Wilson School (Mannington, West Virginia), listed on the NRHP in West Virginia

== See also ==
- Wilson High School (disambiguation)
- Woodrow Wilson High School (disambiguation)
- Woodrow Wilson Junior High School (disambiguation)
