= Lauderdale County School District =

Lauderdale County School District, Lauderdale County School System, or Lauderdale County Schools may refer to:

- Lauderdale County School District (Alabama)
- Lauderdale County School District (Mississippi)
- Lauderdale County School District (Tennessee)
