= Patrick Hape =

American football player (born 1974)

No. 82, 86
- Position: Tight end

Personal information
- Born: June 6, 1974 (age 52); Killen, Alabama, U.S.
- Listed height: 6 ft 4 in (1.93 m)
- Listed weight: 254 lb (115 kg)

Career information
- High school: Brooks (Killen)
- College: Alabama
- NFL draft: 1997: 5th round, 137th overall pick

Career history
- Tampa Bay Buccaneers (1997–2000); Denver Broncos (2001–2005); Houston Texans (2006)*
- * Offseason or practice squad member only

Career NFL statistics
- Receptions: 51
- Receiving yards: 287
- Receiving touchdowns: 11
- Stats at Pro Football Reference

Patrick Stephen Hape (born June 6, 1974) is an American former professional football player who was a fullback and tight end for the Denver Broncos, Tampa Bay Buccaneers, and Houston Texans of the National Football League (NFL). He played college football for the Alabama Crimson Tide and was selected in the fifth round of the 1997 NFL draft with the 137th overall pick.

Hape played four seasons with the Tampa Bay Buccaneers as a tight end, and five seasons with the Denver Broncos, although he did not play in 2005. His career high in receptions came in 2001 when he had 15 catches for 96 yards and 3 touchdowns in his first year with the Broncos. In eight seasons, Hape grabbed 51 receptions for 287 yards and 11 touchdowns. 22% of his career receptions were touchdowns. He also scored the first regular-season touchdown at Invesco Field at Mile High.

In December 2000, Hape was fined $5,000 by the NFL for excessive end zone celebration with teammates Keyshawn Johnson and Dave Moore.

He was known for his versatility, blocking, durability in remaining rather injury-free, reliability near the goal line, ability to play the H-Back position (a position developed by coach Joe Gibbs), and a colorful personality in the locker room.

He signed a three-year, $1.7 million contract with the Broncos in April 2004, only to be cut by Denver on August 30, 2005.

In late May 2006, free agent Hape was briefly reunited with his former offensive coordinator, Gary Kubiak, signing a contract with the Houston Texans after being out of the league in 2005. He was released by the Texans less than three months later, essentially ending his active NFL career. He is no longer listed as an active NFL player, nor has he explicitly retired.

Hape is also friends with former-Buccaneer teammate Mike Alstott.

As a Buccaneer, he wore jersey number 82. As a Bronco, he switched to number 86. In his brief stint as a Texan in 2006, he wore number 45.

He is an avid golfer, winning the Town of Castle Rock Celebrity Golf Tournament in 2004, playing with other Denver Bronco teammates.

He went on bowling excursions to bolster team chemistry while in Denver with then-Bronco teammates including Matt Lepsis, Tom Nalen, and Jeb Putzier.

The future NFLer earned all-state accolades while playing tight end, linebacker and running back at Brooks High School in Alabama. Hape rushed for 660 yards and scored seven touchdowns as a prep. At the University of Alabama, Hape majored in Business Management. Hape is currently a financial advisor at Merrill Lynch.
