= Marsha Thornton =

American singer-songwriter (born 1964)

- Born: October 22, 1964 (age 61)
- Origin: Killen, Alabama, United States
- Genre: Country
- Occupation: singer
- Instrument: Vocals
- Years active: 1989–2003
- Labels: MCA; Metronome

Marsha Thornton (born October 22, 1964, in Killen, Alabama) is an American country music singer. Between 1990 and 2003, she released three studio albums, with her first two released on MCA Records; she has also issued four singles on the Hot Country Songs charts. Her highest peaking single was "A Bottle of Wine and Patsy Cline", written by Lindy Gravelle, which reached No. 59 in 1990.

In 1991, Thornton was shortlisted for the Academy of Country Music Award for New Female Artist of the Year.

== Discography ==
=== Albums ===
Title	Album details	Peak positions
Title	Album details	US Country
Marsha Thornton	Release date: December 20, 1989; Label: MCA Records	49
Maybe the Moon Will Shine	Release date: February 19, 1991; Label: MCA Records	—
Farther Along: Acappella Hymns of Farewell	Release date: 2003; Label: Metronome	—
"—" denotes releases that did not chart

=== Singles ===
Year	Single	Peak positions		Album
Year	Single	US Country	CAN Country	Album
1989	"Deep Water"	62	—	Marsha Thornton
1990	"A Bottle of Wine and Patsy Cline"	59	23	Marsha Thornton
1990	"The Grass Is Greener"	—^{A}	65	Marsha Thornton
1991	"Maybe the Moon Will Shine"	73	—	Maybe the Moon Will Shine
"—" denotes releases that did not chart

Notes:

- ^{A} "The Grass Is Greener" did not chart on Hot Country Songs, but peaked at No. 4 on Hot Country Radio Breakouts.

=== Music videos ===
Year	Video
1990	"A Bottle of Wine and Patsy Cline"
1991	"Maybe The Moon Will Shine"
