= Lauderdale County High School =

Coordinates: 34.82872°N 87.29132°W

Location
- 201 Cedar Street; Rogersville, Alabama 35652; United States

Information
- Type: Primary and secondary School (American)
- Established: 1907 (119 years ago)
- School district: Lauderdale County School District
- CEEB code: 012340
- Principal: Joshua Jennings
- Staff: 29.67 (FTE)
- Grades: K to 12
- Gender: coed
- Enrollment: 562 (2023–2024)
- Student to teacher ratio: 18.94
- Campus size: 52 acres (21 ha)
- Colors: Maroon and white
- Mascot: Tiger
- Newspaper: The Paw Print
- Yearbook: The Reflector
- Website: lauderdalehs.lcschools.org

Lauderdale County High School (LCHS) is a public elementary and high school (grades K-12) located in Rogersville, Alabama. It is one of eleven public schools in the Lauderdale County, Alabama School District.

== History ==
In August 1907, the Alabama Legislature passed an act mandating the establishment public high schools for the education of white students in each county under Governor B. B. Comer. Rogersville was chosen as the site for Lauderdale County by the Lauderdale County Board of Education.

The elementary building was destroyed by fire in 1959 and was replaced by a modern structure. The present high school building was built in 1958.

The present campus is approximately fifty-two acres. It consists of an elementary building, a junior high building, a high school building, a science wing, a cafeteria, band room, gym and athletic facilities. Completed in 2001, the prominent Office/Library Complex contains the school's main office, a library media center for Grades 7-12 and two English classrooms. A new elementary building was built in 2010 to accommodate elementary students in grades four through six and provides grade-level access to a resource classroom, counselor office, conference room and a teacher workroom. The newest addition to Lauderdale County High School was a new high school science wing that was completed in January 2015. The new building has four new state-of-the-art science classrooms and labs, along with a teacher workroom.

== Sports ==
Lauderdale County High School has earned 20 state championships, one in football (1974), one in track (1979), one in boys tennis (2026), three in girls tennis (2023, 2024, 2025), and fourteen in girls basketball: (1987, 1991, 1992, 1993, 1998, 2002, 2003, 2006, 2012, 2013, 2014, 2015, 2016, and 2025). The Lady Tigers basketball team holds the records for most girls' state basketball championships in Alabama (14) and for the most wins recorded in a single season (39). Records for the University of North Alabama indicate that the school then known as Florence Normal College once played Lauderdale County High School in football in the early part of the century, and LCHS won over the college team. In the 1940s during World War II, many young men were fighting, so the school played six-man football.

== Notable alumni ==
- Harlon Hill
