= Waterloo High School (Alabama) =

Public high school in Waterloo, Alabama, United States

Location
- 311 School House Lane; Waterloo, Alabama 35677; United States
- 34°55′07″N 88°03′52″W

Information
- Type: Public high school
- School district: Lauderdale County Schools
- CEEB code: 012805
- Principal: Tim McFall (2024-Present)
- Teaching staff: 22.70 (on FTE basis)
- Grades: PK-12
- Enrollment: 339 (2023-2024)
- Student to teacher ratio: 14.93
- Colors: Green and white
- Mascot: Cougar
- Website: waterloo.lcschools.org

Waterloo High School is a high school in Waterloo, Alabama in Lauderdale County, Alabama. The high school is a public school in the Lauderdale County School System under the Alabama State Board of Education. The high school has grades Kindergarten - Twelfth grade in one building. It has about 250-350 students in a school year. The current building was constructed in 1986.

== Sports ==
The school has six sports: Baseball, softball, cross country, volleyball, basketball, and football. They compete in the Alabama High School Athletic Association division 1A. The mascot is the Cougar. Previous mascots include the Stripes (for Striped Bass), the Bulldog, and the Lilly Pads.

The school has won state titles in the following sports:

- Girls Basketball: 1990
- Girls Fast Pitch Softball: 2003, 2005, 2006
- Girls Slow Pitch softball: 1993, 1994, 1995, 1997, 2001
- Boys Baseball: 1990
