= Brooks High School (Alabama) =

Public high school in Killen, Alabama, United States

Location
- 4300 Highway 72; Killen, Alabama 35645; United States
- 34°51′27″N 87°29′40″W

Information
- Other name: BHS
- Type: Public high school
- Established: 1908 (118 years ago)
- School district: Lauderdale County Schools
- CEEB code: 011568
- NCES School ID: 010201000764
- Principal: Jerry Hill
- Teaching staff: 42.00 (on an FTE basis)
- Grades: 7–12
- Enrollment: 744 (2023-2024)
- Student to teacher ratio: 17.71
- Colors: Orange and black
- Mascot: Luther the Lion
- Website: brookshs.lcschools.org

Brooks High School (BHS) is a public high school in Killen, Alabama, United States. It was established in 1908 and is part of the Lauderdale County Schools district.

== History ==
The first Killen school was built in 1908 on what is now Jones Avenue and was moved to the present site of Brooks Elementary School in 1935. The tradition of Brooks High School began with the 1968–1969 school year, during which Brooks had an enrollment of 325 students in grades seven through 10. The modern school's enrollment is around 780 students in grades seven through 12.

== Notable alumni ==
- Patrick Hape, NFL fullback and tight end
- Freddie Roach, football player and assistant football coach for The University of Alabama

== Notable staff ==
- Harlon Hill — teacher and principal, NFL player
