= Woodrow Wilson High School =

Woodrow Wilson High School may refer to:

== Schools currently named Woodrow Wilson High School ==
- Wilson Memorial High School, Fishersville, Virginia
- Woodrow Wilson Classical High School, Long Beach, California
- Woodrow Wilson High School (Beckley, West Virginia)
- Woodrow Wilson High School (Dallas, Texas)
- Woodrow Wilson High School (Los Angeles)
- Woodrow Wilson High School (Spring Township, Pennsylvania)

== Schools formerly named Woodrow Wilson High School ==
- August Martin High School, Jamaica, Queens: Reconfigured in 1971
- Dakota High School (Fargo, North Dakota): Renamed in 2021
- Eastside High School (Camden, New Jersey): Renamed in 2022
- Harry S Truman High School (Levittown, Pennsylvania): Renamed in 1980
- Ida B. Wells-Barnett High School, Portland, Oregon: Renamed in 2021
- Jackson-Reed High School, Washington, D.C. Renamed in 2022
- Manor High School (Portsmouth, Virginia): Renamed in 2021
- Silas High School, Tacoma, Washington: Renamed in 2021
- Woodrow Wilson High School (Middletown, Connecticut): Closed in 1958
- Woodrow Wilson High School, San Francisco Unified School District school closed in 1996
- Woodrow Wilson High School (Youngstown, Ohio): Closed in 2007

== See also ==
- Wilson School (disambiguation)
- Wilson High School (disambiguation)
- Woodrow Wilson Junior High School (disambiguation)
