= 2024 Tarleton State Texans football team =

American college football season

2024 Tarleton State Texans football

NCAA Division I Second Round, L 31–42 at South Dakota
- Conference: United Athletic Conference

Ranking
- STATS: No. 13
- FCS Coaches: No. 12
- Record: 10–4 (6–2 UAC)
- Head coach: Todd Whitten (15th season)
- Offensive coordinator: Adam Austin (1st season)
- Co-offensive coordinator: Scott Carey (1st season)
- Offensive scheme: Pro spread
- Defensive coordinator: Tyrone Nix (3rd season)
- Base defense: 4–3
- Home stadium: Memorial Stadium

2024 United Athletic Conference standings
| | Conf. | | | Overall |
| Team | W | | L | W | | L |
|---|---|---|---|---|---|---|
| No. 14 Abilene Christian $^ | 7 | – | 1 | 9 | – | 5 |
| No. 13 Tarleton State ^ | 6 | – | 2 | 10 | – | 4 |
| No. 21 Eastern Kentucky ^ | 6 | – | 2 | 8 | – | 5 |
| Southern Utah | 6 | – | 2 | 7 | – | 5 |
| Central Arkansas | 3 | – | 5 | 6 | – | 6 |
| Austin Peay | 3 | – | 5 | 4 | – | 8 |
| North Alabama | 3 | – | 5 | 3 | – | 9 |
| West Georgia* | 1 | – | 7 | 4 | – | 7 |
| Utah Tech | 1 | – | 7 | 1 | – | 11 |
$ – Conference champion; ^ – FCS playoff participant; Note: West Georgia is ineligible for the UAC title and FCS postseason play due to transition from NCAA Division II.; Rankings from STATS Poll

The 2024 Tarleton State Texans football team represented Tarleton State University as a member of the United Athletic Conference (UAC) during the 2024 NCAA Division I FCS football season. The Texans were coached by fifteenth-year head coach Todd Whitten and played at Memorial Stadium in Stephenville, Texas.

== Schedule ==
| Date | Time | Opponent | Rank | Site | TV | Result | Attendance |
|---|---|---|---|---|---|---|---|
| August 24 | 2:30 p.m. | McNeese* | No. 21 | Memorial Stadium; Stephenville, TX | ESPN2 | W 26–23 | 16,125 |
| August 31 | 6:00 p.m. | at Baylor* | No. 21 | McLane Stadium; Waco, TX | ESPN+ | L 3–45 | 42,272 |
| September 7 | 6:00 p.m. | at Houston Christian* | No. 20 | Husky Stadium; Houston, TX | ESPN+ | W 35–18 | 2,080 |
| September 21 | 6:00 p.m. | at North Alabama | No. 16 | Braly Stadium; Florence, AL | ESPN+ | W 28–14 | 7,432 |
| September 28 | 6:00 p.m. | Southeastern Louisiana* | No. 16 | Memorial Stadium; Stephenville, TX | ESPN+ | W 36–33 | 22,312 |
| October 5 | 7:00 p.m. | Southern Utah | No. 14 | Eccles Coliseum; Cedar City, UT | ESPN+ | W 38–37 ^{OT} | 3,562 |
| October 12 | 6:00 p.m. | Utah Tech^{†} | No. 13 | Memorial Stadium; Stephenville, TX | ESPN+ | W 42–0 | 22,018 |
| October 26 | 3:00 p.m. | at Austin Peay | No. 8 | Fortera Stadium; Clarksville, TN | ESPN+ | W 27–17 | 8,219 |
| November 2 | 6:00 p.m. | Eastern Kentucky | No. 7 | Memorial Stadium; Stephenville, TX | ESPN+ | L 13–17 | 15,281 |
| November 9 | 1:00 p.m. | at West Georgia | No. 14 | University Stadium; Carrollton, GA | ESPN+ | W 38–21 | 2,634 |
| November 16 | 6:00 p.m. | No. 14 Abilene Christian | No. 13 | Memorial Stadium; Stephenville, TX | ESPN+ | L 31–35 | 22,348 |
| November 23 | 2:00 p.m. | Central Arkansas | No. 16 | Memorial Stadium; Stephenville, TX | ESPN+ | W 39–14 | 14,800 |
| November 30 | 2:00 p.m. | Drake* | No. 14 | Memorial Stadium; Stephenville, TX (NCAA Division I First Round) | ESPN+ | W 43–29 | 3,583 |
| December 7 | 2:00 p.m. | at No. 4 South Dakota* | No. 14 | DakotaDome; Vermillion, SD (NCAA Division I Second Round) | ESPN+ | L 31–42 | 6,231 |
*Non-conference game; ^{†}Homecoming; Rankings from STATS Poll released prior to the game; All times are in Central time

== Game summaries ==
=== vs. McNeese ===
Game One – McNeese Cowboys (0-0) vs No.21 Tarleton State Texans (0-0) – Game summary

| Quarter | 1 | 2 | 3 | 4 | Total |
|---|---|---|---|---|---|
| Cowboys | 7 | 0 | 3 | 13 | 23 |
| No. 21 Texans | 16 | 10 | 0 | 0 | 26 |

at Memorial Stadium • Stephenville, TX

- Date: Saturday August 24, 2024
- Game time: 2:30 p.m.
- Game weather: Sunny, 96 °F (36 °C), SE at 9 miles per hour (14 km/h)
- Game attendance: 16,125
- Referee: Matthew Jones
- TV announcers (ESPN2): Lowell Galindo (play-by-play) and Fozzy Whittaker (analyst)

Game information

First quarter

- (11:12) TAR – Michael James 53-yard field goal (Drive: 6 plays, 12 yards, 02:41, Tarleton State 3–0)
- (08:16) MCN – Jamaal Levi 43-yard pass from Clifton McDowell (Tyler Larco kick) (Drive: 8 plays, 43 yards, 02:56, McNeese 7–3)
- (04:09) TAR – Derrel Kelley III 1-yard run (Michael James kick) (Drive: 10 plays, 64 yards, 04:01, Tarleton State 10–7)
- (03:23) TAR – Kasyus Kurns 31-yard fumble recovery (kick failed) (Tarleton State 16–7)

Second quarter

- (07:35) TAR – Keylan Johnson 26-yard pass from Victor Gabalis (Michael James kick) (Drive: 12 plays, 83 yards, 04:34, Tarleton State 23–7)
- (03:10) TAR – Michael James 34-yard field goal (Drive: 6 plays, 38 yards, 03:05, Tarleton State 26–7)

Third quarter

- (00:46) MCN – Tyler Larco 36-yard field goal (Drive: 10 plays, 38 yards, 05:58, Tarleton State 26–10)

Fourth quarter

- (09:32) MCN – D'Angelo Durham 7-yard run (kick failed) (Drive: 9 plays, 72 yards, 00:11, Tarleton State 26–16)
- (04:15) MCN – Matthew McCallister 80-yard pass from Clifton McDowell (Tyler Larco kick) (Drive: 1 play, 80 yards, 00:11, Tarleton State 26–23)

| Statistics | MCN | TAR |
|---|---|---|
| First downs | 20 | 19 |
| Total yards | 66–445 | 69–339 |
| Rushing yards | 46–200 | 43–195 |
| Passing yards | 245 | 144 |
| Passing: Comp–Att–Int | 14—20–1 | 12–26–0 |
| Time of possession | 25:32 | 34:28 |

| Team | Category | Player | Statistics |
|---|---|---|---|
| McNeese | Passing | Clifton McDowell | 13/19, 242 yards, 2 TD, INT |
| McNeese | Rushing | Clifton McDowell | 20 carries, 67 yards |
| McNeese | Receiving | Matthew McCallister | 1 reception, 80 yards, TD |
| Tarleton State | Passing | Victor Gabelis | 11/18, 140 yards, TD |
| Tarleton State | Rushing | Kayvon Britten | 25 carries, 164 yards |
| Tarleton State | Receiving | Darius Cooper | 6 receptions, 85 yards |

=== at Baylor (FBS) ===
Game Two – No. 21 Tarleton State Texans (1–0) vs Baylor Bears (FBS) (0–0) – Game summary

| Quarter | 1 | 2 | 3 | 4 | Total |
|---|---|---|---|---|---|
| No. 21 Texans | 0 | 0 | 3 | 0 | 3 |
| Bears (FBS) | 21 | 7 | 7 | 10 | 45 |

at McLane Stadium • Waco, TX

- Date: Saturday August 31, 2024
- Game time: 6:00 PM CST
- Game weather: Sunny, 89 °F (32 °C)
- Game attendance: 42,272
- Referee: Cravonne Barrett
- TV announcers (ESPN+): Pete Souza (play-by-play) and Brad Hopkins (analyst)

Game information

First quarter

- (13:37) BAY - Dequan Finn 39-yard rush (Isaiah Hankins kick) Drive: 5 Plays, 66 Yards, 1:23. Bears 7-0
- (4:52) BAY - Ashtyn Hawkins 32-yard reception from Dequan Finn (Isaiah Hankins Kick) Drive: 5 Plays, 46 Yards, 2:09 Bears 14-0
- (4:12) BAY - Keaton Thomas 35-yard interception return (Isaiah Hankins kick) Bears 21-0

Second quarter

- (9:59) BAY - Dawson Pendergrass 1-yard rush (Isaiah Hankins kick) Drive: 9 Plays, 66 Yards, 2:50 Bears 28-0

Third quarter

- (11:23) TAR - Adrian Guzman 34-yard Field Goal Drive: 8 Plays, 58 Yards, 2:24 Bears 28-3
- (8:11) BAY - Michael Trigg 19-yard reception from Dequan Finn (Isaiah Hankins kick) Drive: 7 Plays, 63 Yards, 3:08 Bears 35-3

Fourth quarter

- (9:37) BAY - Isaiah Hankins 39-yard Field Goal Drive: 8 Plays, 22 Yards, 2:40 Bears 38-3
- (3:51) BAY - Ketron Jackson Jr. 30-yard reception from Sawyer Robertson Drive: 9 Plays, 83 Yards, 3:13 Bears 45-3

| Statistics | TAR | BAY |
|---|---|---|
| First downs | 9 | 24 |
| Total yards | 181 | 442 |
| Rushing yards | 101 | 164 |
| Passing yards | 80 | 278 |
| Passing: Comp–Att–Int | 7–15–1 | 18–28–2 |
| Time of possession | 31:20 | 28:40 |

| Team | Category | Player | Statistics |
|---|---|---|---|
| Tarleton State | Passing | Daniel Greek | 7/13, 80 yards |
| Tarleton State | Rushing | Kayvon Britten | 13 carries, 68 yards |
| Tarleton State | Receiving | Darius Cooper | 2 receptions, 44 yards |
| Baylor | Passing | Dequan Finn | 14/22, 192 yards, 2 TD |
| Baylor | Rushing | Richard Reese | 18 carries, 78 yards |
| Baylor | Receiving | Ketron Jackson Jr. | 2 receptions, 69 yards, TD |

=== at Houston Christian ===
Game Three – No. 20 Tarleton State Texans (1–1) vs Houston Christian Huskies (0–1) – Game summary

| Quarter | 1 | 2 | 3 | 4 | Total |
|---|---|---|---|---|---|
| No. 20 Texans | 0 | 0 | 0 | 0 | 0 |
| Huskies | 0 | 0 | 0 | 0 | 0 |

at Husky Stadium • Houston, TX

- Date: Saturday September 7, 2024
- Game time: 6:00 PM CST
- Game weather: 0 °F (−18 °C)
- TV announcers (ESPN+): Jordan Smith (play-by-play) and Brandon Kruse (analyst)

Game information

First quarter
Second quarter
Third quarter
Fourth quarter

| Statistics | TAR | HCU |
|---|---|---|
| First downs | | |
| Total yards | | |
| Rushing yards | | |
| Passing yards | | |
| Passing: Comp–Att–Int | | |
| Time of possession | | |

| Team | Category | Player | Statistics |
|---|---|---|---|
| Tarleton State | Passing | | |
| Tarleton State | Rushing | | |
| Tarleton State | Receiving | | |
| Houston Christian | Passing | | |
| Houston Christian | Rushing | | |
| Houston Christian | Receiving | | |

=== at North Alabama ===
Game Four – No. 16 Tarleton State Texans (2–1) vs North Alabama Lions (0–4) – Game summary

| Quarter | 1 | 2 | 3 | 4 | Total |
|---|---|---|---|---|---|
| No. 16 Texans | 0 | 7 | 14 | 7 | 28 |
| Lions | 3 | 3 | 8 | 0 | 14 |

at Braly Stadium • Florence, AL

- Date: Saturday September 21, 2024
- Game time: 6:00 PM CST
- Game weather: SE at 4 miles per hour (6.4 km/h) • Weather: Cloudy • Temp: 89 °F (32 °C)
- Game attendance: 7,432
- Referee: Gabriel Tomlin
- TV announcers (ESPN+): Benjamin Ray (play-by-play) and Bryan Neece (analyst)

Game information

First quarter

- (7:57) UNA – Scott Payne 20-yard field goal (Drive: 13 plays, 72 yards, 7:03; UNA 3-0)

Second quarter

- (9:05) TAR – Kayvon Britten 96-yard rush (Adrian Guzman kick) (Drive: 1 play, 96 yards, 0:11; TAR 7-3)
- (0:14) UNA – Scott Payne 22-yard field goal (Drive: 14 plays, 72 yards, 5:28; TAR 7-6)

Third quarter

- (10:10) TAR – Kayvon Britten 2-yard rush (Adrian Guzman kick) (Drive: 5 plays, 19 yards, 2:48; TAR 14-6)
- (6:42) UNA – Jayvian Allen 10-yard rush (Ben Harris pass to Kaleb Heatherly) (Drive: 9 plays, 75 yards, 3:28; Tie 14-14)
- (5:57) TAR – Kayvon Britten 65-yard rush (Adrian Guzman kick) (Drive: 2 plays, 71 yards, 0:39; TAR 21-14)

Fourth quarter

- (3:22) TAR – Kayvon Britten 9-yard rush (Adrian Guzman kick) (Drive: 8 plays, 80 yards, 4:51; TAR 28-14)

| Statistics | TAR | UNA |
|---|---|---|
| First downs | 10 | 24 |
| Total yards | 334 | 385 |
| Rushing yards | 284 | 189 |
| Passing yards | 50 | 196 |
| Passing: Comp–Att–Int | 6-13 | 20-35-1 |
| Time of possession | 22:08 | 37:52 |

| Team | Category | Player | Statistics |
|---|---|---|---|
| Tarleton State | Passing | Victor Gabalis | 6/13, 50 yards |
| Tarleton State | Rushing | Kayvon Britten | 21 carries, 273 yards, 4 TD |
| Tarleton State | Receiving | Darius Cooper | 2 receptions, 33 yards |
| North Alabama | Passing | Ben Harris | 7/12, 100 yards, 1 INT |
| North Alabama | Rushing | TJ Smith | 14 carries, 72 yards |
| North Alabama | Receiving | Dakota Warfield | 6 receptions, 91 yards |

=== vs. Southeastern Louisiana ===
Game Five – Southeastern Louisiana Lions (1–3) vs No. 16 Tarleton State Texans (3–1) – Game summary

| Quarter | 1 | 2 | 3 | 4 | Total |
|---|---|---|---|---|---|
| Lions | 0 | 16 | 10 | 7 | 33 |
| No. 16 Texans | 0 | 14 | 15 | 7 | 36 |

at Memorial Stadium • Stephenville, TX

- Date: Saturday September 28, 2024
- Game time: 6:03 p.m.
- Game weather: Wind: NW 8 mph • Weather: Clear • Temperature: 86
- Game attendance: 22,312
- TV: ESPN+

Game information

First quarter
Second quarter
Third quarter
Fourth quarter

| Statistics | SELA | TAR |
|---|---|---|
| First downs | 22 | 24 |
| Total yards | 73–396 | 67–416 |
| Rushing yards | 44–236 | 41–213 |
| Passing yards | 160 | 203 |
| Passing: Comp–Att–Int | 18–29–1 | 15–26–1 |
| Time of possession | 31:12 | 28:48 |

| Team | Category | Player | Statistics |
|---|---|---|---|
| Southeastern Louisiana | Passing | Eli Sawyer | 17/27, 155 yards, 1 INT |
| Southeastern Louisiana | Rushing | Antonio Martin Jr. | 32 carries, 206 yards, 3 TD |
| Southeastern Louisiana | Receiving | Jaylon Domingeaux | 4 receptions, 59 yards |
| Tarleton State | Passing | Victor Gabalis | 15/26, 203 yards, 3 TD, 1 INT |
| Tarleton State | Rushing | Kayvon Britten | 28 carries, 174 yards, 1 TD |
| Tarleton State | Receiving | Darius Cooper | 8 receptions, 90 yards, 2 TD |

=== vs. Southern Utah ===
Game Six – Southern Utah Thunderbirds (2–3) vs No. 14 Tarleton State Texans (4–1) – Game summary

| Quarter | 1 | 2 | 3 | 4 | Total |
|---|---|---|---|---|---|
| Thunderbirds | 0 | 0 | 0 | 0 | 0 |
| No. 14 Texans | 0 | 0 | 0 | 0 | 0 |

at Memorial Stadium • Stephenville, TX

- Date: Saturday October 5, 2024
- Game time: 7:00 p.m.
- TV announcers (ESPN+): TBD

Game information

First quarter
Second quarter
Third quarter
Fourth quarter

| Statistics | SUU | TAR |
|---|---|---|
| First downs | | |
| Total yards | | |
| Rushing yards | | |
| Passing yards | | |
| Passing: Comp–Att–Int | | |
| Time of possession | | |

| Team | Category | Player | Statistics |
|---|---|---|---|
| Southern Utah | Passing | | |
| Southern Utah | Rushing | | |
| Southern Utah | Receiving | | |
| Tarleton State | Passing | | |
| Tarleton State | Rushing | | |
| Tarleton State | Receiving | | |

=== vs. Utah Tech ===
Game Seven – Utah Tech Trailblazers (0–6) vs No. 13 Tarleton State Texans (5–1) – Game summary

| Quarter | 1 | 2 | 3 | 4 | Total |
|---|---|---|---|---|---|
| Trailblazers | 0 | 0 | 0 | 0 | 0 |
| No. 13 Texans | 0 | 0 | 0 | 0 | 0 |

at Memorial Stadium • Stephenville, TX

- Date: Saturday October 12, 2024
- Game time: 5:00 p.m.
- TV announcers (ESPN+): TBD

Game information

First quarter
Second quarter
Third quarter
Fourth quarter

| Statistics | UTU | TAR |
|---|---|---|
| First downs | | |
| Total yards | | |
| Rushing yards | | |
| Passing yards | | |
| Passing: Comp–Att–Int | | |
| Time of possession | | |

| Team | Category | Player | Statistics |
|---|---|---|---|
| Utah Tech | Passing | | |
| Utah Tech | Rushing | | |
| Utah Tech | Receiving | | |
| Tarleton State | Passing | | |
| Tarleton State | Rushing | | |
| Tarleton State | Receiving | | |

=== at Austin Peay ===
Game Eight – No. 8 Tarleton State Texans (6–1) vs Austin Peay Governors (3–4) – Game summary

| Quarter | 1 | 2 | 3 | 4 | Total |
|---|---|---|---|---|---|
| No. 8 Texans | 0 | 0 | 0 | 0 | 0 |
| Governors | 0 | 0 | 0 | 0 | 0 |

at Fortera Stadium • Clarksville, TN

- Date: Saturday October 26, 2024
- Game time: 3:00 PM CST
- Game weather: 0 °F (−18 °C)
- TV announcers (ESPN+): Ethan Schmidt (play-by-play) and Colby Wilson (analyst)

Game information

First quarter
Second quarter
Third quarter
Fourth quarter

| Statistics | TAR | APSU |
|---|---|---|
| First downs | | |
| Total yards | | |
| Rushing yards | | |
| Passing yards | | |
| Passing: Comp–Att–Int | | |
| Time of possession | | |

| Team | Category | Player | Statistics |
|---|---|---|---|
| Tarleton State | Passing | | |
| Tarleton State | Rushing | | |
| Tarleton State | Receiving | | |
| Austin Peay | Passing | | |
| Austin Peay | Rushing | | |
| Austin Peay | Receiving | | |

=== vs. Eastern Kentucky ===
Game Nine – Eastern Kentucky Colonels (4–4) vs No. 7 Tarleton State Texans (7–1) – Game summary

| Quarter | 1 | 2 | 3 | 4 | Total |
|---|---|---|---|---|---|
| Colonels | 0 | 7 | 3 | 7 | 17 |
| No. 7 Texans | 7 | 6 | 0 | 0 | 13 |

at Memorial Stadium • Stephenville, TX

- Date: Saturday November 2, 2024
- Game time: 6:00 p.m.
- Game weather: Cloudy • Temperature: 77 °F (25 °C) • Wind: SE 14 miles per hour (23 km/h)
- Game attendance: 15,281
- Referee: Brad Carrell
- TV announcers (ESPN+): Greg Stotelmyer (play-by-play), Wes Chandler and Jim Trey (analysts)

Game information

First quarter

- TSU – Cody Jackson 23-yard pass from Victor Gabalis (Corbin Poston kick), 4:03. Tarleton State 7–0. Drive: 9 plays, 89 yards, 4:18.

Second quarter

- TSU – Corbin Poston 24-yard field goal, 14:49. Tarleton State 10–0. Drive: 7 plays, 62 yards, 2:08.
- EKU – Joshua Carter 1-yard run (Patrick Nations kick), 7:10. Tarleton State 10–7. Drive: 1 play, 1 yard, 0:05.
- TSU – Corbin Poston 42-yard field goal, 0:20. Tarleton State 13–7. Drive: 13 plays, 62 yards, 3:04.

Third quarter

- EKU – Patrick Nations 34-yard field goal, 7:48. Tarleton State 13–10. Drive: 7 plays, 23 yards, 2:57.

Fourth quarter

- EKU – Joshua Carter 23-yard run (Patrick Nations kick), 2:26. Eastern Kentucky 17–13. Drive: 4 plays, 62 yards, 1:48.

| Statistics | EKU | TAR |
|---|---|---|
| First downs | 16 | 22 |
| Total yards | 274 | 397 |
| Rushing yards | 243 | 163 |
| Passing yards | 31 | 234 |
| Passing: Comp–Att–Int | 6–11–1 | 17–41–3 |
| Time of possession | 33:46 | 25:41 |

| Team | Category | Player | Statistics |
|---|---|---|---|
| Eastern Kentucky | Passing | Matt Morrissey | 6/11, 31 yards, INT |
| Eastern Kentucky | Rushing | Joshua Carter | 22 carries, 147 yards, 2 TD |
| Eastern Kentucky | Receiving | Caeleb Schlachter | 1 reception, 11 yards |
| Tarleton State | Passing | Victor Gabalis | 17/41, 234 yards, TD, 3 INT |
| Tarleton State | Rushing | Kayvon Britten | 25 carries, 154 yards |
| Tarleton State | Receiving | Benjamin Omayebu | 9 receptions, 100 yards |

=== at West Georgia ===
Game Ten – No. 14 Tarleton State Texans (7–2) vs West Georgia Wolves (3–6) – Game summary

| Quarter | 1 | 2 | 3 | 4 | Total |
|---|---|---|---|---|---|
| No. 14 Texans | 0 | 0 | 0 | 0 | 0 |
| Wolves | 0 | 0 | 0 | 0 | 0 |

at University Stadium • Carrollton, GA

- Date: Saturday November 9, 2024
- Game time: 1:00 PM CST
- Game weather: 0 °F (−18 °C)
- TV announcers (ESPN+): TBD

Game information

First quarter
Second quarter
Third quarter
Fourth quarter

| Statistics | TAR | UWG |
|---|---|---|
| First downs | | |
| Total yards | | |
| Rushing yards | | |
| Passing yards | | |
| Passing: Comp–Att–Int | | |
| Time of possession | | |

| Team | Category | Player | Statistics |
|---|---|---|---|
| Tarleton State | Passing | | |
| Tarleton State | Rushing | | |
| Tarleton State | Receiving | | |
| West Georgia | Passing | | |
| West Georgia | Rushing | | |
| West Georgia | Receiving | | |

=== vs. No. 14 Abilene Christian ===
Game Eleven – No. 14 Abilene Christian Wildcats (7–3) vs No. 13 Tarleton State Texans (8–2) – Game summary

| Quarter | 1 | 2 | 3 | 4 | Total |
|---|---|---|---|---|---|
| No. 14 Wildcats | 10 | 7 | 3 | 15 | 35 |
| No. 13 Texans | 14 | 0 | 7 | 10 | 31 |

at Memorial Stadium • Stephenville, TX

- Date: Saturday November 16, 2024
- Game time: 6:00 p.m.
- Game weather: Sunny • Temperature: 75 °F (24 °C) • Wind: SE 13 miles per hour (21 km/h)
- Game attendance: 22,348
- Referee: John Kellermeier
- TV announcers (ESPN+): Alex Gould (play-by-play) and Ethan Schmidt (analyst)

Game information

First quarter

- (10:52) ACU – Nehemiah Martinez I 5-yard pass from Maverick McIvor, Ritse Vaes kick (Drive: 9 plays, 75 yards, 4:08; Abilene Christian 7–0)
- (8:50) TAR – Cody Jackson 58-yard pass from Victor Gabalis, Corbin Poston kick (Drive: 4 plays, 85 yards, 1:59; Tied 7–7)
- (0:21) ACU – Ritse Vaes 32-yard field goal (Drive: 15 plays, 60 yards, 8:29; Abilene Christian 10–7)
- (0:09) TAR – Darius Cooper 75-yard pass from Victor Gabalis, Corbin Poston kick (Drive: 1 play, 75 yards, 0:12; Tarleton State 14–10)

Second quarter

- (12:17) ACU – Javon Gipson 29-yard pass from Maverick McIvor, Ritse Vaes kick (Drive: 7 plays, 75 yards, 2:52; Abilene Christian 17–14)

Third quarter

- (13:25) TAR – Darius Cooper 22-yard pass from Victor Gabalis, Corbin Poston kick (Drive: 4 plays, 75 yards, 1:35; Tarleton State 21–17)
- (1:23) ACU – Ritse Vaes 27-yard field goal (Drive: 14 plays, 87 yards, 7:14; Tarleton State 21–20)

Fourth quarter

- (12:27) TAR – Braelon Bridges 1-yard run, Corbin Poston kick (Drive: 8 plays, 83 yards, 3:51; Tarleton State 28–20)
- (9:25) ACU – Sam Hicks 12-yard run, Blayne Taylor pass (Drive: 7 plays, 77 yards, 2:56; Tied 28–28)
- (1:48) TAR – Corbin Poston 25-yard field goal (Drive: 14 plays, 58 yards, 7:37; Tarleton State 31–28)
- (0:19) ACU – Sam Hicks 1-yard pass from Maverick McIvor, Ritse Vaes kick (Drive: 12 plays, 75 yards, 1:29; Abilene Christian 35–31)

| Statistics | ACU | TAR |
|---|---|---|
| First downs | 31 | 20 |
| Total yards | 544 | 486 |
| Rushing yards | 153 | 182 |
| Passing yards | 391 | 304 |
| Passing: Comp–Att–Int | 35–55–0 | 15–20–0 |
| Time of possession | 35:54 | 24:06 |

| Team | Category | Player | Statistics |
|---|---|---|---|
| Abilene Christian | Passing | Maverick McIvor | 35/55, 391 yards, 3 TD |
| Abilene Christian | Rushing | Sam Hicks | 22 carries, 135 yards, TD |
| Abilene Christian | Receiving | Blayne Taylor | 10 receptions, 168 yards |
| Tarleton State | Passing | Victor Gabalis | 15/20, 304 yards, 3 TD |
| Tarleton State | Rushing | Kayvon Britten | 22 carries, 101 yards |
| Tarleton State | Receiving | Darius Cooper | 6 receptions, 141 yards, 2 TD |

=== vs. Central Arkansas ===
Game Twelve – Central Arkansas Bears (6–5) vs No. 16 Tarleton State Texans (8–3) – Game summary

| Quarter | 1 | 2 | 3 | 4 | Total |
|---|---|---|---|---|---|
| Bears | 0 | 0 | 0 | 0 | 0 |
| No. 16 Texans | 0 | 0 | 0 | 0 | 0 |

at Memorial Stadium • Stephenville, TX

- Date: Saturday November 23, 2024
- Game time: 6:00 p.m.
- TV announcers (ESPN+): TBD

Game information

First quarter
Second quarter
Third quarter
Fourth quarter

| Statistics | UCA | TAR |
|---|---|---|
| First downs | | |
| Total yards | | |
| Rushing yards | | |
| Passing yards | | |
| Passing: Comp–Att–Int | | |
| Time of possession | | |

| Team | Category | Player | Statistics |
|---|---|---|---|
| Central Arkansas | Passing | | |
| Central Arkansas | Rushing | | |
| Central Arkansas | Receiving | | |
| Tarleton State | Passing | | |
| Tarleton State | Rushing | | |
| Tarleton State | Receiving | | |

=== vs. Drake (NCAA Division I playoff–first round) ===
Game Thirteen – Drake Bulldogs (8–2) vs No. 14 Tarleton State Texans (9–3) – Game summary

| Quarter | 1 | 2 | 3 | 4 | Total |
|---|---|---|---|---|---|
| Bulldogs | 14 | 0 | 7 | 8 | 29 |
| No. 14 Texans | 3 | 19 | 7 | 14 | 43 |

at Memorial Stadium • Stephenville, TX

- Date: Saturday November 30, 2024
- Game time: 2:00 p.m.
- TV announcers (ESPN+): Peter Sousa (play-by-play) and Dave Steckel (analyst)

Game information

First quarter
Second quarter
Third quarter
Fourth quarter

| Statistics | DRKE | TAR |
|---|---|---|
| First downs | | |
| Total yards | | |
| Rushing yards | | |
| Passing yards | | |
| Passing: Comp–Att–Int | | |
| Time of possession | | |

| Team | Category | Player | Statistics |
|---|---|---|---|
| Drake | Passing | | |
| Drake | Rushing | | |
| Drake | Receiving | | |
| Tarleton State | Passing | | |
| Tarleton State | Rushing | | |
| Tarleton State | Receiving | | |

=== at No. 4 South Dakota (NCAA Division I playoff–second round) ===
Game Fourteen – No. 14 Tarleton State Texans (10–3) vs No. 4 South Dakota Coyotes (9–2) – Game summary

| Quarter | 1 | 2 | 3 | 4 | Total |
|---|---|---|---|---|---|
| No. 14 Texans | 7 | 14 | 7 | 3 | 31 |
| No. 4 Coyotes | 7 | 7 | 7 | 21 | 42 |

at DakotaDome • Vermillion, SD

- Date: Saturday December 7, 2024
- Game time: 2:00 p.m.
- Game attendance: 6,231
- TV announcers (ESPN+): TBD

Game information

First quarter
Second quarter
Third quarter
Fourth quarter

| Statistics | TAR | SDAK |
|---|---|---|
| First downs | | |
| Total yards | | |
| Rushing yards | | |
| Passing yards | | |
| Passing: Comp–Att–Int | | |
| Time of possession | | |

| Team | Category | Player | Statistics |
|---|---|---|---|
| Tarleton State | Passing | | |
| Tarleton State | Rushing | | |
| Tarleton State | Receiving | | |
| South Dakota | Passing | | |
| South Dakota | Rushing | | |
| South Dakota | Receiving | | |
