= Woodrow Wilson Junior High School =

Woodrow Wilson Junior High School may refer to:

- Castor Gardens Middle School, formerly Woodrow Wilson Junior High School, listed on the NRHP in Pennsylvania
- Woodrow Wilson Junior High School (Eugene, Oregon), listed on the NRHP in Oregon: Closed in 1987
- Woodrow Wilson Middle School (Terre Haute, Indiana), formerly Woodrow Wilson Junior High School, listed on the NRHP in Indiana

== See also ==
- Wilson School (disambiguation)
- Wilson High School (disambiguation)
- Woodrow Wilson High School (disambiguation)
