= Rogersville, Alabama =

- Town
- Town of Rogersville
- Location of Rogersville in Lauderdale County, Alabama.
- Coordinates: 34°49′24″N 87°15′57″W
- Country: United States
- State: Alabama
- County: Lauderdale

Area
  - Total: 3.03 sq mi (7.86 km^{2})
  - Land: 3.03 sq mi (7.86 km^{2})
  - Water: 0.0039 sq mi (0.01 km^{2})
- Elevation: 646 ft (197 m)

Population (2020)
  - Total: 1,286
  - Density: 424.0/sq mi (163.71/km^{2})
- Time zone: UTC-6 (Central (CST))
  - Summer (DST): UTC-5 (CDT)
- ZIP code: 35652
- Area code: 256
- FIPS code: 01-66216
- GNIS feature ID: 2407235
- Website: rogersvillealabama.gov

Rogersville is a town in Lauderdale County, Alabama, United States. As of the 2020 census, Rogersville had a population of 1,286.

== History ==
The town became an incorporated municipality on February 2, 1858. Originally known as "Rodgersville", it took its name from Andrew and Patience Rodgers of South Carolina who moved into the area and purchased 79.8 acres (323,000 m^{2}) at a public land sale in Huntsville on May 3, 1818. Their land eventually became what is now the downtown business district. When the Rogersville Post Office was established on October 4, 1825, with Thomas Cunningham as the postmaster, the 'd' was dropped from the town's name and it has been known as Rogersville ever since.

The town became a popular trading center due in part to its location near the intersection of three early thoroughfares, U.S. 72, Snake Road and Lamb's Ferry Road. U.S. 72, which now connects Chattanooga and Memphis, Tennessee, was once part of an Indian trail from Ditto's Landing on the Tennessee River south of Huntsville and was used to bypass the Muscle Shoals river barrier. Snake Road leads out of Rogersville into neighboring Limestone County and provided passage from Florence to Athens by way of a shallow ford across Elk River. Lamb's Ferry Road was named for John Lamb who moved from Indian Creek in Giles County, Tennessee in 1816 to establish a ferry across the Tennessee River south of what would later become Rogersville. Lamb's Ferry became an important river port where boats from Knoxville and other points on the upper Tennessee River would unload supplies that were taken over land to areas around Pulaski, TN.

== Geography ==
According to the U.S. Census Bureau, the town has a total area of 3.1 square miles (8.0 km^{2}), all land.

== Demographics ==
Historical population
Census	Pop.	Note	%±
1870	435		—
1880	61		−86.0%
1920	397		—
1930	445		12.1%
1940	508		14.2%
1950	531		4.5%
1960	766		44.3%
1970	950		24.0%
1980	1,224		28.8%
1990	1,125		−8.1%
2000	1,199		6.6%
2010	1,257		4.8%
2020	1,286		2.3%
U.S. Decennial Census; 2013 Estimate

=== 2020 census ===
As of the 2020 census, Rogersville had a population of 1,286. The median age was 39.8 years. 23.8% of residents were under the age of 18 and 21.9% of residents were 65 years of age or older. For every 100 females there were 84.5 males, and for every 100 females age 18 and over there were 82.2 males age 18 and over.

0.0% of residents lived in urban areas, while 100.0% lived in rural areas.

There were 542 households in Rogersville, of which 31.0% had children under the age of 18 living in them. Of all households, 44.1% were married-couple households, 16.4% were households with a male householder and no spouse or partner present, and 34.9% were households with a female householder and no spouse or partner present. About 31.9% of all households were made up of individuals and 18.4% had someone living alone who was 65 years of age or older.

There were 635 housing units, of which 14.6% were vacant. The homeowner vacancy rate was 1.4% and the rental vacancy rate was 10.7%.

Racial composition as of the 2020 census
Race	Number	Percent
White	1,122	87.2%
Black or African American	65	5.1%
American Indian and Alaska Native	5	0.4%
Asian	10	0.8%
Native Hawaiian and Other Pacific Islander	2	0.2%
Some other race	22	1.7%
Two or more races	60	4.7%
Hispanic or Latino (of any race)	33	2.6%

=== 2010 census ===
At the 2010 census there were 1,257 people, 555 households, and 342 families in the town. The population density was 405.5 inhabitants per square mile (156.6/km^{2}). There were 639 housing units at an average density of 206.1 per square mile (79.6/km^{2}). The racial makeup of the town was 91.2% White, 6.1% Black or African American, 1.0% Native American, 0.6% Asian, 0.2% from other races, and 0.8% from two or more races. 1.7% of the population were Hispanic or Latino of any race. Of the 555 households 24.7% had children under the age of 18 living with them, 44.3% were married couples living together, 13.2% had a female householder with no husband present, and 38.4% were non-families. 34.6% of households were one person and 18.9% were one person aged 65 or older. The average household size was 2.26 and the average family size was 2.94.

The age distribution was 22.1% under the age of 18, 7.5% from 18 to 24, 23.4% from 25 to 44, 25.1% from 45 to 64, and 22.0% 65 or older. The median age was 43 years. For every 100 females, there were 87.9 males. For every 100 females age 18 and over, there were 92.6 males.

The median household income was $32,727 and the median family income was $44,803. Males had a median income of $44,219 versus $38,229 for females. The per capita income for the town was $19,605. About 12.2% of families and 12.8% of the population were below the poverty line, including 12.5% of those under age 18 and 10.8% of those age 65 or over.

=== 2000 census ===
At the 2000 census there were 1,199 people, 536 households, and 361 families in the town. The population density was 389.6 inhabitants per square mile (150.4/km^{2}). There were 604 housing units at an average density of 196.3 per square mile (75.8/km^{2}). The racial makeup of the town was 93.08% White, 5.67% Black or African American, 0.17% Native American, 0.42% Asian, 0.08% from other races, and 0.58% from two or more races. 0.42% of the population were Hispanic or Latino of any race. Of the 536 households 26.1% had children under the age of 18 living with them, 51.1% were married couples living together, 12.9% had a female householder with no husband present, and 32.5% were non-families. 31.2% of households were one person and 19.0% were one person aged 65 or older. The average household size was 2.24 and the average family size was 2.79.

The age distribution was 22.2% under the age of 18, 7.3% from 18 to 24, 24.7% from 25 to 44, 24.4% from 45 to 64, and 21.4% 65 or older. The median age was 42 years. For every 100 females, there were 83.6 males. For every 100 females age 18 and over, there were 79.8 males.

The median household income was $29,779 and the median family income was $37,639. Males had a median income of $30,852 versus $18,571 for females. The per capita income for the town was $16,435. About 10.2% of families and 14.3% of the population were below the poverty line, including 19.2% of those under age 18 and 15.7% of those age 65 or over.

== Education ==
It is in the Lauderdale County School District. The area high school is Lauderdale County High School.

== Notable people ==
- Susan Parker, 37th Alabama State Auditor
- Larry Woods, former NFL player
- Casey White, Alabama prisoner convicted of murder, known for a high-profile 2022 jail escape involving a corrections officer.
