= 2024 Austin Peay Governors football team =

American college football season

2024 Austin Peay Governors football
- Conference: United Athletic Conference
- Record: 4–8 (3–5 UAC)
- Head coach: Jeff Faris (1st season)
- Offensive coordinator: Quinn Billerman (1st season)
- Defensive coordinator: Tripp Weaver (1st season)
- Home stadium: Fortera Stadium

2024 United Athletic Conference standings
	Conf.			Overall
Team	W		L	W		L
No. 14 Abilene Christian $^	7	–	1	9	–	5
No. 13 Tarleton State ^	6	–	2	10	–	4
No. 21 Eastern Kentucky ^	6	–	2	8	–	5
Southern Utah	6	–	2	7	–	5
Central Arkansas	3	–	5	6	–	6
Austin Peay	3	–	5	4	–	8
North Alabama	3	–	5	3	–	9
West Georgia*	1	–	7	4	–	7
Utah Tech	1	–	7	1	–	11
$ – Conference champion; ^ – FCS playoff participant; Note: West Georgia is ineligible for the UAC title and FCS postseason play due to transition from NCAA Division II.; Rankings from STATS Poll

The 2024 Austin Peay Governors football team represented Austin Peay State University as a member of the United Athletic Conference (UAC) during the 2024 NCAA Division I FCS football season. The Governors were coached by first-year head coach Jeff Faris and played at Fortera Stadium in Clarksville, Tennessee.

== Schedule ==
Date	Time	Opponent	Site	TV	Result	Attendance
August 31	11:00 a.m.	at Louisville*	L&N Federal Credit Union Stadium; Louisville, KY	ACCN	L 0–62	47,067
September 7	6:00 p.m.	No. 10 Southern Illinois*	Fortera Stadium; Clarksville, TN	ESPN+	L 17–31	8,124
September 14	6:00 p.m.	at No. 7 Central Arkansas	Estes Stadium; Conway, AR	ESPN+	L 17–45	9,167
September 21	6:00 p.m.	Alabama A&M*	Fortera Stadium; Clarksville, TN	ESPN+	W 59–16	7,947
September 28	1:00 p.m.	Southern Utah	Fortera Stadium; Clarksville, TN	ESPN+	L 17–28	3,988
October 5	1:00 p.m.	at West Georgia	University Stadium; Carrollton, GA	ESPN+	W 20–16	2,674
October 19	3:00 p.m.	at Utah Tech	Greater Zion Stadium; St. George, UT	ESPN+	W 13–7	3,133
October 26	3:00 p.m.	No. 8 Tarleton State^{†}	Fortera Stadium; Clarksville, TN	ESPN+	L 17–27	8,219
November 2	4:00 p.m.	at North Alabama	Braly Municipal Stadium; Florence, AL	ESPN+	W 31–17	7,286
November 9	3:00 p.m.	No. 15 Abilene Christian	Fortera Stadium; Clarksville, TN	ESPN+	L 34–35	3,741
November 16	1:00 p.m.	Eastern Kentucky	Fortera Stadium; Clarksville, TN	ESPN+	L 27–30 ^{OT}	6,117
November 23	1:00 p.m.	Chattanooga*	Fortera Stadium; Clarksville, TN	ESPN+	L 17–24	6,105
*Non-conference game; ^{†}Homecoming; Rankings from STATS Poll released prior to the game; All times are in Central time

== Game summaries ==
=== at Louisville (FBS) ===
Game One – Austin Peay Governors (0-0) at Louisville Cardinals (FBS) (0-0) – Game summary

Quarter	1	2	3	4	Total
Governors	0	0	0	0	0
Cardinals (FBS)	10	28	21	3	62

at L&N Stadium • Louisville, KY

- Date: Saturday August 31, 2024
- Game time: 12:00 p.m.
- Game weather: 0 °F (−18 °C)
- TV announcers (ACCN): Jorge Sedano (play-by-play), Orlando Franklin (analyst), and Morgan Uber (sideline)

Game information

First quarter

- (10:48) LOU – Brock Travelstead 30-yard field goal (Drive: 7 plays, 62 yards, 4:12; Louisville 3–0)
- (8:10) LOU – Ja'Corey Brooks 9-yard pass from Tyler Shough (Brock Travelstead kick) (Drive: 5 plays, 33 yards, 1:36; Louisville 10–0)

Second quarter

- (14:51) LOU – Keyjuan Brown 4-yard run (Brock Travelstead kick) (Drive: 9 plays, 54 yards, 5:07; Louisville 17–0)
- (10:55) LOU – Jadon Thompson 33-yard pass from Tyler Shough (Brock Travelstead kick) (Drive: 5 plays, 90 yards, 1:56; Louisville 24–0)
- (7:17) LOU – Mark Redman 21-yard pass from Tyler Shough (Brock Travelstead kick) (Drive: 3 plays, 35 yards, 1:27; Louisville 31–0)
- (0:10) LOU – Jadon Thompson 5-yard pass from Tyler Shough (Brock Travelstead kick) (Drive: 2 plays, 13 yards, 0:15; Louisville 38–0)

Third quarter

- (8:04) LOU – Isaac Brown 77-yard run (Brock Travelstead kick) (Drive: 1 play, 77 yards, 0:15; Louisville 45–0)
- (2:39) LOU – Ramon Puryear 0-yard fumble recovery (Cooper Ranvier kick) (Louisville 52–0)
- (0:17) LOU – Duke Watson 7-yard run (Nick Keller kick) (Drive: 3 plays, 24 yards, 1:12; Louisville 59–0)

Fourth quarter

- (5:00) LOU – Brock Travelstead 38-yard field goal (Drive: 11 plays, 59 yards, 6:53; Louisville 62–0)

Statistics	APSU	LOU
First downs	9	23
Total yards	106	571
Rushing yards	34	293
Passing yards	72	278
Passing: Comp–Att–Int	14–24–1	27–34–0
Time of possession	29:10	30:50

Team	Category	Player	Statistics
Austin Peay	Passing	Austin Smith	11–16, 53 yards, INT
Austin Peay	Rushing	Lavell Wright	7 carries, 23 yards
Austin Peay	Receiving	Jaden Barnes	3 receptions, 30 yards
Louisville	Passing	Tyler Shough	18–24, 232 yards, 4 TD
Louisville	Rushing	Isaac Brown	5 carries, 123 yards, TD
Louisville	Receiving	Ja'Corey Brooks	7 receptions, 83 yards, TD

=== No. 10 Southern Illinois ===
Game Two – No. 10 Southern Illinois Salukis (0–1) vs Austin Peay Governors (0–1) – Game summary

Quarter	1	2	3	4	Total
No. 10 Salukis	0	0	0	0	0
Governors	0	0	0	0	0

at Fortera Stadium • Clarksville, TN

- Date: September 7, 2024
- Game time: 6:00 p.m. CST
- Game weather: 0 °F (−18 °C)
- Game attendance: 8,124
- TV announcers (ESPN+): Alex Gould, Ethan Schmidt

Game information

First quarter
Second quarter
Third quarter
Fourth quarter

Statistics	SIU	APSU
First downs		
Total yards		
Rushing yards		
Passing yards		
Passing: Comp–Att–Int		
Time of possession		

Team	Category	Player	Statistics
Southern Illinois	Passing		
Southern Illinois	Rushing		
Southern Illinois	Receiving		
Austin Peay	Passing		
Austin Peay	Rushing		
Austin Peay	Receiving		

=== at No. 7 Central Arkansas ===
Game Three – Austin Peay Governors (0–2) vs No. 7 Central Arkansas Bears (1–1) – Game summary

Quarter	1	2	3	4	Total
Governors	0	0	0	0	0
No. 7 Bears	0	0	0	0	0

at Estes Stadium • Conway, AR

- Date: Saturday September 14, 2024
- Game time: 6:00 PM CST
- Game weather: 0 °F (−18 °C)
- TV announcers (ESPN+): Dylan McLemore, JB Brazeal

Game information

First quarter
Second quarter
Third quarter
Fourth quarter

Statistics	UCA	APSU
First downs		
Total yards		
Rushing yards		
Passing yards		
Passing: Comp–Att–Int		
Time of possession		

Team	Category	Player	Statistics
Central Arkansas	Passing		
Central Arkansas	Rushing		
Central Arkansas	Receiving		
Austin Peay	Passing		
Austin Peay	Rushing		
Austin Peay	Receiving		

=== vs. Alabama A&M ===
Game Four – Alabama A&M Bulldogs (2–1) vs Austin Peay Governors (0–3) – Game summary

Quarter	1	2	3	4	Total
Bulldogs	0	0	0	0	0
Governors	0	0	0	0	0

at Fortera Stadium • Clarksville, TN

- Date: Saturday September 21, 2024
- Game time: 6:00 PM CST
- Game weather: 0 °F (−18 °C)
- TV announcers (ESPN+): Alex Gould, Ethan Schmidt

Game information

First quarter
Second quarter
Third quarter
Fourth quarter

Statistics	AAMU	APSU
First downs		
Total yards		
Rushing yards		
Passing yards		
Passing: Comp–Att–Int		
Time of possession		

Team	Category	Player	Statistics
Alabama A&M	Passing		
Alabama A&M	Rushing		
Alabama A&M	Receiving		
Austin Peay	Passing		
Austin Peay	Rushing		
Austin Peay	Receiving		

=== vs. Southern Utah ===
Game Five – Southern Utah Thunderbirds (1–3) vs Austin Peay Governors (1–3) – Game summary

Quarter	1	2	3	4	Total
Thunderbirds	0	0	0	0	0
Governors	0	0	0	0	0

at Fortera Stadium • Clarksville, TN

- Date: Saturday September 28, 2024
- Game time: 1:00 PM CST
- Game weather: 0 °F (−18 °C)
- TV announcers (ESPN+): Ethan Schmidt, Colby Wilson

Game information

First quarter
Second quarter
Third quarter
Fourth quarter

Statistics	SUU	APSU
First downs		
Total yards		
Rushing yards		
Passing yards		
Passing: Comp–Att–Int		
Time of possession		

Team	Category	Player	Statistics
Southern Utah	Passing		
Southern Utah	Rushing		
Southern Utah	Receiving		
Austin Peay	Passing		
Austin Peay	Rushing		
Austin Peay	Receiving		

=== at West Georgia ===
Game Six – Austin Peay Governors (1–4) at West Georgia Wolves (1–3) – Game summary

Quarter	1	2	3	4	Total
Governors	0	0	0	0	0
Wolves	0	0	0	0	0

at University Stadium • Carrollton, GA

- Date: Saturday October 5, 2024
- Game time: 1:00 p.m.
- Game weather: 0 °F (−18 °C)
- TV announcers (ESPN+): Logan Maddox, Parker Gore, Carlie Pair

Game information

First quarter
Second quarter
Third quarter
Fourth quarter

Statistics	APSU	UWG
First downs		
Total yards		
Rushing yards		
Passing yards		
Passing: Comp–Att–Int		
Time of possession		

Team	Category	Player	Statistics
Austin Peay	Passing		
Austin Peay	Rushing		
Austin Peay	Receiving		
West Georgia	Passing		
West Georgia	Rushing		
West Georgia	Receiving		

=== at Utah Tech ===
Game Seven – Austin Peay Governors (2–4) at Utah Tech Trailblazers (0–7) – Game summary

Quarter	1	2	3	4	Total
Governors	0	0	0	0	0
Trailblazers	0	0	0	0	0

at Greater Zion Stadium • St. George, UT

- Date: Saturday October 19, 2024
- Game time: 2:00 p.m.
- Game weather: 0 °F (−18 °C)
- TV announcers (ESPN+): Rod Zundel, Max Christensen III

Game information

First quarter
Second quarter
Third quarter
Fourth quarter

Statistics	APSU	UTU
First downs		
Total yards		
Rushing yards		
Passing yards		
Passing: Comp–Att–Int		
Time of possession		

Team	Category	Player	Statistics
Austin Peay	Passing		
Austin Peay	Rushing		
Austin Peay	Receiving		
Utah Tech	Passing		
Utah Tech	Rushing		
Utah Tech	Receiving		

=== vs. No. 8 Tarleton State ===
Game Eight – No. 8 Tarleton State Texans (6–1) vs Austin Peay Governors (3–4) – Game summary

Quarter	1	2	3	4	Total
No. 8 Texans	0	0	0	0	0
Governors	0	0	0	0	0

at Fortera Stadium • Clarksville, TN

- Date: Saturday October 26, 2024
- Game time: 3:00 PM CST
- Game weather: 0 °F (−18 °C)
- TV announcers (ESPN+): Ethan Schmidt, Colby Wilson

Game information

First quarter
Second quarter
Third quarter
Fourth quarter

Statistics	TAR	APSU
First downs		
Total yards		
Rushing yards		
Passing yards		
Passing: Comp–Att–Int		
Time of possession		

Team	Category	Player	Statistics
Tarleton State	Passing		
Tarleton State	Rushing		
Tarleton State	Receiving		
Austin Peay	Passing		
Austin Peay	Rushing		
Austin Peay	Receiving		

=== at North Alabama ===
Game Nine – Austin Peay Governors (3–5) vs North Alabama Lions (3–6) – Game summary

Quarter	1	2	3	4	Total
Governors	10	14	0	7	31
Lions	0	3	14	0	17

at Braly Stadium • Florence, AL

- Date: Saturday November 2, 2024
- Game time: 4:00 PM CST
- Game weather: SW at 4 miles per hour (6.4 km/h) • Weather: Cloudy • Temp: 73 °F (23 °C)
- Game attendance: 7,286
- Referee: John Kellermeier
- TV announcers (ESPN+): Benjamin Ray (play-by-play) and Bryan Neece (analyst)

Game information

First quarter

- (10:50) APSU – Carson Smith 37-yard field goal (Drive: 6 plays, 50 yards, 2:59; APSU 3-0)
- (3:56) APSU – Jaden Barnes 57-yard pass from Austin Smith (Carson Smith kick) (Drive: 7 plays, 80 yards, 2:59; APSU 10-0)

Second quarter

- (13:24) APSU – Jaden Barnes 31-yard pass from Austin Smith (Carson Smith kick) (Drive: 7 plays, 78 yards, 3:37; APSU 17-0)
- (8:17) UNA – Scott Payne 42-yard field goal (Drive: 11 plays, 50 yards, 5:07; APSU 17-3)
- (1:16) APSU – Ramon Copeland Jr 14-yard pass from Austin Smith (Carson Smith kick) (Drive: 12 plays, 75 yards, 7:01; APSU 24-3)

Third quarter

- (13:25) UNA – TJ Smith 14-yard run (Scott Payne kick) (Drive: 4 plays, 54 yards, 1:27; APSU 24-10)
- (5:40) UNA – Ben Harris 19-yard pass from TJ Smith (Scott Payne kick) (Drive: 7 plays, 73 yards, 3:44; APSU 24-17)

Fourth quarter

- (7:21) APSU – Jaden Barnes 49-yard pass from Austin Smith (Carson Smith kick) (Drive: 3 plays, 71 yards, 1:12; APSU 31-17)

Statistics	APSU	UNA
First downs	26	20
Total yards	528	394
Rushing yards	122	116
Passing yards	406	278
Passing: Comp–Att–Int	31–35–1	25–39–1
Time of possession	33:48	26:12

Team	Category	Player	Statistics
Austin Peay	Passing	Austin Smith	31/35, 406 yards, 4 TD, INT
Austin Peay	Rushing	La'Vell Wright	14 carries, 61 yards
Austin Peay	Receiving	Jaden Barnes	12 receptions, 241 yards, 3 TD
North Alabama	Passing	TJ Smith	25/39, 278 yards, TD, INT
North Alabama	Rushing	Jayvian Allen	10 carries, 62 yards
North Alabama	Receiving	Dakota Warfield	7 receptions, 84 yards

=== vs. No. 15 Abilene Christian ===
Game Ten – No. 15 Abilene Christian Wildcats (6–3) vs Austin Peay Governors (4–5) – Game summary

Quarter	1	2	3	4	Total
No. 15 Wildcats	14	0	14	7	35
Governors	14	13	0	7	34

at Fortera Stadium • Clarksville, TN

- Date: Saturday November 9, 2024
- Game time: 3:00 PM CST
- Game weather: Rain • Temperature: 59 °F (15 °C) • Wind: E 4 miles per hour (6.4 km/h)
- Game attendance: 3,741
- Referee: Jeremee Tate
- TV announcers (ESPN+): Alex Gould, Ethan Schmidt

Game information

First quarter

- (12:35) APSU – Jaden Barnes 58-yard pass from Austin Smith, Carson Smith kick (Drive: 3 plays, 69 yards, 0:55; Austin Peay 7–0)
- (9:58) ACU – JJ Henry 66-yard pass from Maverick McIvor, Ritse Vaes kick (Drive: 5 plays, 80 yards, 2:31; Tied 7–7)
- (6:39) APSU – La'Vell Wright 2-yard run, Carson Smith kick (Drive: 7 plays, 71 yards, 3:13; Austin Peay 14–7)
- (3:52) ACU – JJ Henry 44-yard pass from Maverick McIvor, Ritse Vaes kick (Drive: 6 plays, 79 yards, 2:42; Tied 14–14)

Second quarter

- (10:38) APSU – Carson Smith 29-yard field goal (Drive: 15 plays, 52 yards, 8:06; Austin Peay 17–14)
- (8:24) APSU – Jaden Barnes 73-yard pass from Austin Smith, Carson Smith kick (Drive: 1 play, 73 yards, 0:11; Austin Peay 24–14)
- (0:16) APSU – Carson Smith 33-yard field goal (Drive: 15 plays, 50 yards, 4:59; Austin Peay 27–14)

Third quarter

- (6:23) ACU – Sam Hicks 14-yard run, Ritse Vaes kick (Drive: 9 plays, 56 yards, 5:12; Austin Peay 27–21)
- (0:55) ACU – Sam Hicks 15-yard run, Ritse Vaes kick (Drive: 8 plays, 72 yards, 3:25; Abilene Christian 28–27)

Fourth quarter

- (11:54) APSU – Austin Smith 1-yard run, Carson Smith kick (Drive: 7 plays, 68 yards, 3:53; Austin Peay 34–28)
- (3:07) ACU – Jed Castles 15-yard pass from Maverick McIvor, Ritse Vaes kick (Drive: 10 plays, 74 yards, 3:12; Abilene Christian 35–34)

Statistics	ACU	APSU
First downs	26	17
Total yards	526	415
Rushing yards	171	107
Passing yards	355	308
Passing: Comp–Att–Int	25–42–0	18–32–0
Time of possession	30:58	29:02

Team	Category	Player	Statistics
Abilene Christian	Passing	Maverick McIvor	25/42, 355 yards, 3 TD
Abilene Christian	Rushing	Sam Hicks	16 carries, 113 yards, 2 TD
Abilene Christian	Receiving	JJ Henry	3 receptions, 125 yards, 2 TD
Austin Peay	Passing	Austin Smith	18/32, 308 yards, 2 TD
Austin Peay	Rushing	La'Vell Wright	17 carries, 66 yards, TD
Austin Peay	Receiving	Jaden Barnes	6 receptions, 179 yards, 2 TD

=== vs. Eastern Kentucky ===
Game Eleven – Eastern Kentucky Colonels (6–4) vs Austin Peay Governors (4–6) – Game summary

Quarter	1	2	3	4	Total
Colonels	0	0	0	0	0
Governors	0	0	0	0	0

at Fortera Stadium • Clarksville, TN

- Date: Saturday November 16, 2024
- Game time: 1:00 PM CST
- Game weather: 0 °F (−18 °C)
- TV announcers (ESPN+): Ethan Schmidt, Colby Wilson

Game information

First quarter
Second quarter
Third quarter
Fourth quarter

Statistics	EKU	APSU
First downs		
Total yards		
Rushing yards		
Passing yards		
Passing: Comp–Att–Int		
Time of possession		

Team	Category	Player	Statistics
Eastern Kentucky	Passing		
Eastern Kentucky	Rushing		
Eastern Kentucky	Receiving		
Austin Peay	Passing		
Austin Peay	Rushing		
Austin Peay	Receiving		

=== vs. Chattanooga ===
Game Twelve – Chattanooga Mocs (6–5) vs Austin Peay Governors (4–7) – Game summary

Quarter	1	2	3	4	Total
Mocs	0	0	0	0	0
Governors	0	0	0	0	0

at Fortera Stadium • Clarksville, TN

- Date: Saturday November 23, 2024
- Game time: 1:00 PM CST
- Game weather: 0 °F (−18 °C)
- TV announcers (ESPN+): Ethan Schmidt, Colby Wilson

Game information

First quarter
Second quarter
Third quarter
Fourth quarter

Statistics	UTC	APSU
First downs		
Total yards		
Rushing yards		
Passing yards		
Passing: Comp–Att–Int		
Time of possession		

Team	Category	Player	Statistics
Chattanooga	Passing		
Chattanooga	Rushing		
Chattanooga	Receiving		
Austin Peay	Passing		
Austin Peay	Rushing		
Austin Peay	Receiving		
