= Lauderdale County School District (Alabama) =

School district in Alabama

Lauderdale County Schools

Address
- 355 County Rd 61 Florence, Lauderdale, Alabama, 35634; United States

District information
- Grades: PreK-12
- NCES District ID: 0102010

Students and staff
- Enrollment: 8,038 (2020-2021)
- Staff: 476.27 (on an FTE basis)
- Student–teacher ratio: 16.88

Other information
- Website: www.lcschools.org

Lauderdale County School District, Lauderdale County School System, or Lauderdale County Schools is a school district in Lauderdale County, Alabama. Its headquarters is in an unincorporated area near Florence.

It includes areas not in the city of Florence.

== Schools ==
- Allen Career Technical Center
- Brooks High School
- Brooks Elementary
- Central School
- Lauderdale County High School
- Lexington School
- Rogers School
- Underwood Elementary
- Waterloo High School
- Wilson High School
