= Wilson High School (Alabama) =

High school in Alabama, United States

Coordinates: 34.9270°N 87.6703°W

Information
- Established: 1916; 110 years ago
- School district: Lauderdale County School District
- NCES District ID: 0102010
- Teaching staff: 80
- Employees: 130 (including teachers)
- Grades: K-12
- Enrollment: 1300
- Website: wilsonhs.lcschools.org

Wilson High School is a public K-12 school in Lauderdale County, Alabama, near Florence. It is a part of Lauderdale County School District.

As of 2019 it had 130 employees, with 80 of them in the faculty, and 1,300 students.

== History ==
It was established in 1916 and occupied its current site in 1920. It later added a high school program with the first class graduating in 1970.

In 2019, the school administration noticed vaping occurring with students in restrooms for male students, and uninstalled bathroom stall doors to address this. The story was re-posted by news channels outside of Alabama.
