= Killen, Alabama =

- Town
- Town of Killen
- Seal
- Motto: "Home of the Brooks Lions"
- Location of Killen in Lauderdale County, Alabama.
- Coordinates: 34°51′37″N 87°30′42″W
- Country: United States
- State: Alabama
- County: Lauderdale
- Founded: August 22, 1896
- Incorporated: 1957

Area
  - Total: 2.03 sq mi (5.26 km^{2})
  - Land: 2.02 sq mi (5.24 km^{2})
  - Water: 0.0039 sq mi (0.01 km^{2})
- Elevation: 538 ft (164 m)

Population (2020)
  - Total: 1,034
  - Density: 511/sq mi (197.2/km^{2})
- Time zone: UTC-6 (Central (CST))
  - Summer (DST): UTC-5 (CDT)
- ZIP code: 35645
- Area code: 256
- FIPS code: 01-39784
- GNIS feature ID: 2405945
- Website: townofkillen.org

Killen is a town in Lauderdale County, Alabama, United States. It is part of the Florence - Muscle Shoals Metropolitan Statistical Area known as "The Shoals". It was incorporated in 1957. As of the 2020 census, the population of the town is 1,034, down from its record high of 1,119 in 2000.

== History ==
Killen was founded on the Muscle Shoals Canal.

== Geography ==
According to the U.S. Census Bureau, the town has a total area of 1.9 square miles (4.9 km^{2}), all land.

== Demographics ==
=== 2020 census ===
As of the 2020 census, Killen had a population of 1,034. The median age was 45.0 years. 20.8% of residents were under the age of 18, and 20.6% were 65 years of age or older. For every 100 females, there were 91.1 males, and for every 100 females age 18 and over there were 91.8 males age 18 and over.

0.0% of residents lived in urban areas, while 100.0% lived in rural areas.

There were 440 households in Killen, of which 31.4% had children under the age of 18 living in them. Of all households, 52.5% were married-couple households, 15.5% were households with a male householder and no spouse or partner present, and 28.0% were households with a female householder and no spouse or partner present. About 30.2% of all households were made up of individuals, and 14.7% had someone living alone who was 65 years of age or older.

There were 474 housing units, of which 7.2% were vacant. The homeowner vacancy rate was 0.0%, and the rental vacancy rate was 6.1%.

Killen racial composition
Race	Num.	Perc.
White (non-Hispanic)	906	87.62%
Black or African American (non-Hispanic)	29	2.8%
Native American	1	0.1%
Asian	6	0.58%
Other/Mixed	64	6.19%
Hispanic or Latino	28	2.71%

=== 2010 census ===
At the 2010 census there were 1,108 people, 457 households, and 323 families in the town. The population density was 583.2 inhabitants per square mile (225.2/km^{2}). There were 499 housing units at an average density of 262.2 per square mile (101.2/km^{2}). The racial makeup of the town was 94.0% White, 3.2% Black or African American, 0.5% Asian, 1.2% from other races, and 1.0% from two or more races. 2.4%. were Hispanic or Latino of any race.

Of the 457 households, 28.7% had children under the age of 18 living with them, 56.5% were married couples living together, 10.9% had a female householder with no husband present, and 29.3% were non-families. 26.9% of households were made up of individuals, and 10.7% were one person aged 65 or older. The average household size was 2.42, and the average family size was 2.92.

The age distribution was 23.7% under the age of 18, 4.8% from 18 to 24, 26.4% from 25 to 44, 28.5% from 45 to 64, and 16.5% 65 or older. The median age was 40.7 years. For every 100 females, there were 93.7 males. For every 100 females age 18 and over, there were 95.3 males.

The median household income was $48,309, and the median family income was $63,182. Males had a median income of $46,563 versus $34,038 for females. The per capita income for the town was $24,209. About 6.3% of families and 10.2% of the population were below the poverty line, including 12.5% of those under age 18 and 11.9% of those age 65 or over.

=== 2000 census ===
Historical population
Census	Pop.	Note	%±
1960	620		—
1970	683		10.2%
1980	747		9.4%
1990	1,047		40.2%
2000	1,119		6.9%
2010	1,108		−1.0%
2020	1,034		−6.7%
U.S. Decennial Census; 2013 Estimate

At the 2000 census there were 1,119 people, 435 households, and 338 families in the town. The population density was 585.0 inhabitants per square mile (225.9/km^{2}). There were 484 housing units at an average density of 253.0 per square mile (97.7/km^{2}). The racial makeup of the town was 95.26% White, 2.23% Black or African American, 0.45% Asian, 1.61% from other races, and 0.45% from two or more races. 2.59%. were Hispanic or Latino of any race.

Of the 435 households, 35.6% had children under the age of 18 living with them, 66.9% were married couples living together, 7.8% had a female householder with no husband present, and 22.1% were non-families. 18.2% of households were made up of individuals, and 9.0% were one person aged 65 or older. The average household size was 2.57, and the average family size was 2.94.

The age distribution was 24.8% under the age of 18, 7.1% from 18 to 24, 32.2% from 25 to 44, 23.2% from 45 to 64, and 12.6% 65 or older. The median age was 36 years. For every 100 females, there were 91.9 males. For every 100 females age 18 and over, there were 86.9 males.

The median household income was $43,203, and the median family income was $47,596. Males had a median income of $36,957 versus $22,102 for females. The per capita income for the town was $17,872. About 2.4% of families and 5.4% of the population were below the poverty line, including 2.8% of those under age 18 and 8.4% of those age 65 or over.

== Notable people ==
- David Briggs, keyboardist, record producer, and recording studio owner
- Donna Jean Godchaux, session vocalist and former member of the Grateful Dead
- Patrick Hape, former NFL player
- Michael Hill, secessionist, neo-Confederate, and alt-right activist.
- Iron Horse, bluegrass band known for their covers of rock songs
- Willie Ruff, jazz musician and Yale professor
- Marsha Thornton, country music singer
- Shonna Tucker, bassist and former member of the Drive-By Truckers
