= 2024 Central Arkansas Bears football team =

American college football season

2024 Central Arkansas Bears football
- Conference: United Athletic Conference
- Record: 6–6 (3–5 UAC)
- Head coach: Nathan Brown (7th season)
- Offensive coordinator: Ken Collums (7th season)
- Offensive scheme: Spread
- Defensive coordinator: Greg Stewart (4th season)
- Base defense: 4–3
- Home stadium: Estes Stadium

2024 United Athletic Conference standings
	Conf.			Overall
Team	W		L	W		L
No. 14 Abilene Christian $^	7	–	1	9	–	5
No. 13 Tarleton State ^	6	–	2	10	–	4
No. 21 Eastern Kentucky ^	6	–	2	8	–	5
Southern Utah	6	–	2	7	–	5
Central Arkansas	3	–	5	6	–	6
Austin Peay	3	–	5	4	–	8
North Alabama	3	–	5	3	–	9
West Georgia*	1	–	7	4	–	7
Utah Tech	1	–	7	1	–	11
$ – Conference champion; ^ – FCS playoff participant; Note: West Georgia is ineligible for the UAC title and FCS postseason play due to transition from NCAA Division II.; Rankings from STATS Poll

The 2024 Central Arkansas Bears football team represented the University of Central Arkansas as a member of the United Athletic Conference (UAC) during the 2024 NCAA Division I FCS football season. The Bears were coached by seventh-year head coach Nathan Brown and played at Estes Stadium in Conway, Arkansas.

== Schedule ==
Date	Time	Opponent	Rank	Site	TV	Result	Attendance
August 31	6:00 p.m.	at Arkansas State*	No. 11	Centennial Bank Stadium; Jonesboro, AR	ESPN+	L 31–34	21,708
September 7	6:00 p.m.	at Lindenwood*	No. 9	Harlen C. Hunter Stadium; St. Charles, MO	ESPN+	W 34–13	4,668
September 14	6:00 p.m.	Austin Peay	No. 7	Estes Stadium; Conway, AR	ESPN+	W 45–17	9,167
September 21	6:00 p.m.	at Arkansas–Pine Bluff*	No. 8	Simmons Bank Field; Pine Bluff, AR		W 56–17	8,247
September 28	6:00 p.m.	No. 19 Lamar*	No. 7	Estes Stadium; Conway, AR	ESPN+	W 34–14	9,873
October 5	3:00 p.m.	at No. 16 Abilene Christian	No. 5	Wildcat Stadium; Abilene, TX	ESPN+	L 34–41	7,853
October 12	4:00 p.m.	West Georgia	No. 12	Estes Stadium; Conway, AR	ESPN+	W 34–33	4,630
October 26	4:00 p.m.	North Alabama^{†}	No. 12	Estes Stadium; Conway, AR	ESPN+	W 24–19	8,794
November 2	3:00 p.m.	at Utah Tech	No. 11	Greater Zion Stadium; St. George, UT	ESPN+	L 21–34	2,526
November 9	1:00 p.m.	at Eastern Kentucky	No. 16	Roy Kidd Stadium; Richmond, KY	ESPN+	L 24–31	7,902
November 16	4:00 p.m.	Southern Utah	No. 24	Estes Stadium; Conway, AR	ESPN+	L 31–38	4,024
November 23	2:00 p.m.	at No. 16 Tarleton State		Memorial Stadium; Stephenville, TX	ESPN+	L 14–39	14,800
*Non-conference game; ^{†}Homecoming; Rankings from STATS Poll released prior to the game; All times are in Central time

== Game summaries ==
=== at Arkansas State (FBS) ===
Game One – No. 11 Central Arkansas Bears (0–0) at Arkansas State Red Wolves (FBS) (0–0) – Game summary

Quarter	1	2	3	4	Total
No. 11 Bears	0	0	10	21	31
Red Wolves (FBS)	6	7	7	14	34

at Centennial Bank Stadium • Jonesboro, AR

- Date: Saturday August 31, 2024
- Game time: 6:00 p.m.
- Game weather: Sunny • Temperature: 91 °F (33 °C) • Wind: N at 5 miles per hour (8.0 km/h)
- Game attendance: 21,708
- Referee: Marshall Lewis
- TV announcers (ESPN+): Roger Twibell (play-by-play) and Darrell Greene (analyst)

Game information

First quarter

- (12:47) ARST – Clune Van Andel 44-yard field goal (Drive: 7 plays, 42 yards, 2:05; Arkansas State 3–0)
- (2:20) ARST – Clune Van Andel 23-yard field goal (Drive: 18 plays, 75 yards, 7:23; Arkansas State 6–0)

Second quarter

- (0:37) ARST – Zak Wallace 1-yard run, Clune Van Andel kick (Drive: 9 plays, 75 yards, 1:33; Arkansas State 13–0)

Third quarter

- (14:02) UCA – Jake Gaster 42-yard field goal (Drive: 4 plays, 19 yards, 0:50; Arkansas State 13–3)
- (10:36) UCA – ShunDerrick Powell 23-yard run, Jake Gaster kick (Drive: 4 plays, 43 yards, 2:06; Arkansas State 13–10)
- (7:40) ARST – Zak Wallace 2-yard run, Clune Van Andel kick (Drive: 9 plays, 68 yards, 2:48; Arkansas State 20–10)

Fourth quarter

- (14:15) ARST – Jaylen Raynor 5-yard run, Clune Van Andel kick (Drive: 9 plays, 98 yards, 4:28; Arkansas State 27–10)
- (13:38) UCA – ShunDerrick Powell 81-yard run, Jake Gaster kick (Drive: 2 plays, 89 yards, 0:33; Arkansas State 27–17)
- (10:33) UCA – Tyion Berry 23-yard pass from Will McElvain, Jake Gaster kick (Drive: 6 plays, 83 yards, 1:43; Arkansas State 27–24)
- (0:55) UCA – Darius Hale 4-yard run, Jake Gaster kick (Drive: 3 plays, 35 yards, 0:50; Central Arkansas 31–27)
- (0:03) ARST – Corey Rucker 7-yard pass from Jaylen Raynor, Clune Van Andel kick (Drive: 7 plays, 70 yards, 0:52; Arkansas State 34–31)

Statistics	UCA	ARST
First downs	20	24
Total yards	432	457
Rushing yards	235	140
Passing yards	197	317
Passing: Comp–Att–Int	16–29–0	24–47–1
Time of possession	27:23	32:37

Team	Category	Player	Statistics
Central Arkansas	Passing	Will McElvain	15/28, 168 yards, TD
Central Arkansas	Rushing	ShunDerrick Powell	15 carries, 176 yards, 2 TD
Central Arkansas	Receiving	Malachi Henry	4 receptions, 61 yards
Arkansas State	Passing	Jaylen Raynor	24/47, 317 yards, TD, INT
Arkansas State	Rushing	Ja'Quez Cross	13 carries, 50 yards
Arkansas State	Receiving	Corey Rucker	9 receptions, 179 yards, TD

=== at Lindenwood ===
Game Two – No. 9 Central Arkansas Bears (0–1) at Lindenwood Lions (0–1) – Game summary

Quarter	1	2	3	4	Total
No. 9 Bears	0	13	7	14	34
Lions	3	0	3	7	13

at Harlen C. Hunter Stadium • St. Charles, Missouri

- Date: Saturday September 7, 2024
- Game time: 6:00 p.m.
- Game weather: Sunny, 73 °F (23 °C)
- Game attendance: 4,668
- Referee: Michael Lennie
- TV announcers (ESPN+): TBD

Game information

First quarter

- (1:08) LIN – Logan Seibert 32 yard field goal (8 plays, 64 yards, 3:50; LIN 3–0)

Second quarter

- (11:11) CARK – ShunDerrick Powell 4 yard run (Drive: 13 plays, 75 yards, 4:57; CARK 6–3)
- (3:36) CARK – ShunDerrick Powell 55 yard run, Jake Gaster kick (Drive: 6 plays, 93 yards, 3:07; CARK 13–3)

Third quarter

- (8:17) LIN – Logan Seibert 20 yard field goal (Drive: 10 plays, 71 yards, 5:05; CARK 13–6)
- (6:32) CARK – ShunDerrick Powell 69 yard pass from Will McElvain, Jake Gaster kick (Drive: 4 plays, 85 yards, 1:39; CARK 20–6)

Fourth quarter

- (13:43) CARK – Darius Hale 1 yard run, Jake Gaster kick (Drive: 8 plays, 69 yards, 3:16; CARK 27–6)
- (7:08) LIN – Reece Thomas 4 yard pass from Nate Glantz, Logan Seibert kick (Drive: 10 plays, 68 yards, 3:32; CARK 27–13)
- (3:17) CARK – Darius Hale 3 yard run, Jake Gaster kick (Drive: 8 plays, 75 yards, 3:51; CARK 34–13)

Statistics	UCA	LIN
First downs	21	15
Total yards	554	258
Rushing yards	221	76
Passing yards	333	182
Passing: Comp–Att–Int	20–28–0	17–33–0
Time of possession	30:04	29:56

Team	Category	Player	Statistics
Central Arkansas	Passing	Will McElvain	20/28, 333 yards, 1 TD
Central Arkansas	Rushing	ShunDerrick Powell	17 carries, 126 yards, 2 TD
Central Arkansas	Receiving	Kam Robinson	6 receptions, 112 yards
Lindenwood	Passing	Nate Glantz	17/33, 182 yards, TD
Lindenwood	Rushing	Steve Hall	11 carries, 59 yards
Lindenwood	Receiving	Jeff Caldwell	6 receptions, 99 yards

=== vs. Austin Peay ===
Game Three – Austin Peay Governors (0–2) vs No. 7 Central Arkansas Bears (1–1) – Game summary

Quarter	1	2	3	4	Total
Governors	0	0	0	0	0
No. 7 Bears	0	0	0	0	0

at Estes Stadium • Conway, AR

- Date: Saturday September 14, 2024
- Game time: 6:00 PM CST
- Game weather: 0 °F (−18 °C)
- TV announcers (ESPN+): TBD

Game information

First quarter
Second quarter
Third quarter
Fourth quarter

Statistics	APSU	UCA
First downs		
Total yards		
Rushing yards		
Passing yards		
Passing: Comp–Att–Int		
Time of possession		

Team	Category	Player	Statistics
Austin Peay	Passing		
Austin Peay	Rushing		
Austin Peay	Receiving		
Central Arkansas	Passing		
Central Arkansas	Rushing		
Central Arkansas	Receiving		

=== at Arkansas–Pine Bluff ===
Game Four – No. 8 Central Arkansas Bears (2–1) at Arkansas–Pine Bluff Golden Lions (1–2) – Game summary

Quarter	1	2	3	4	Total
No. 8 Bears	0	0	0	0	0
Golden Lions	0	0	0	0	0

at Simmons Bank Field • Pine Bluff, AR

- Date: Saturday September 21, 2024
- Game time: 6:00 p.m.
- Game weather: 0 °F (−18 °C)
- TV announcers (TBD): TBD

Game information

First quarter
Second quarter
Third quarter
Fourth quarter

Statistics	UCA	UAPB
First downs		
Total yards		
Rushing yards		
Passing yards		
Passing: Comp–Att–Int		
Time of possession		

Team	Category	Player	Statistics
Central Arkansas	Passing		
Central Arkansas	Rushing		
Central Arkansas	Receiving		
Arkansas–Pine Bluff	Passing		
Arkansas–Pine Bluff	Rushing		
Arkansas–Pine Bluff	Receiving		

=== vs. No. 19 Lamar ===
Game Five – No. 19 Lamar Cardinals (3–1) vs No. 7 Central Arkansas Bears (3–1) – Game summary

Quarter	1	2	3	4	Total
No. 19 Cardinals	0	7	7	0	14
No. 7 Bears	10	10	7	7	34

at Estes Stadium • Conway, AR

- Date: Saturday September 28, 2024
- Game time: 6:00 PM CST
- Game weather: Weather: Sunny 0 °F (−18 °C)
- Game attendance: 9,873
- Referee: Michael Frain
- TV: ESPN+

Game information

First Quarter

- (06:32 UCA – Courtney, Dax 12 yd pass from McElvain, Will (Gaster, Jake kick) Drive: 8 plays, 80 yards, TOP 05:31, UCA 0–7.
- (03:48 UCA – Gaster, Jake 23 yd field goa Drive: 4 plays, 5 yards, TOP 01:15, UCA 0–10.

Second Quarter

- (08:04) LU – Griffin, Khalan 1 yd run (Woodard, Ben kick) Drive: 2 plays, 10 yards, TOP 00:25, UCA 7–10.
- (04:14) UCA – Powell, ShunDerrick 11 yd run (Gaster, Jake kick) Drive: 9 plays, 75 yards, TOP 03:50, UCA 7–17.
- (00:00) UCA – Gaster, Jake 28 yd field goal Drive: 12 plays, 69 yards, TOP 01:53, UCA 7–20.

Third Quarter

- (06:31) UCA – Hale, Darius 5 yd run (Gaster, Jake kick) Drive: 3 plays, 30 yards, TOP 01:34, UCA 7–27.
- (01:02) LU – Coleman, Robert 16 yd run (Woodard, Ben kick) Drive: 10 plays, 75 yards, TOP 05:29, UCA 14–27.

Fourth Quarter

- (12:26) UCA – Powell, ShunDerrick 18 yd run (Gaster, Jake kick) Drive: 8 plays, 75 yards, TOP 03:36, UCA 14–34.

Statistics	LAM	UCA
First downs	16	26
Total yards	220	439
Rushing yards	108	281
Passing yards	112	158
Passing: Comp–Att–Int	11-20-1	5-22-1
Time of possession	26:28	33:32

Team	Category	Player	Statistics
Lamar	Passing	Robert Coleman	11/20 122 yds. 1 INT
Lamar	Rushing	Khalan Griffin	18 carries, 74 yds, 1 TD
Lamar	Receiving	Sevonne Rhea	5 Receptions, 55 yds
Central Arkansas	Passing	Will McElvain	15/22 158 yds, 1 TD, 1 INT
Central Arkansas	Rushing	ShunDerrick Powell	25 carries, 187 yds, 2 TD
Central Arkansas	Receiving	Trejan Bridges	4 receptions, 60 yds

=== at No. 16 Abilene Christian ===
Game Six – No. 5 Central Arkansas Bears (4–1) at No. 16 Abilene Christian Wildcats (3–2) – Game summary

Quarter	1	2	3	4	Total
No. 5 Bears	7	10	7	10	34
No. 16 Wildcats	14	17	3	7	41

at Wildcat Stadium, Abilene, Texas

- Date: Saturday October 5, 2024
- Game time: 3:00 p.m. CDT
- Game weather: Sunny
- Game attendance: 7,853
- Referee: Gabe Tomlin
- TV announcers (ESPN+): Grant Boone (play-by-play) and Bob Shipley (analyst)

Game information

First quarter

- ACU – Nehemiah Martinez I 70-yard pass from Maverick McIvor (Ritse Vaes kick), 11:27. Wildcats 7–0. Drive: 1 play, 70 yards, 0:16.
- CARK – ShunDerrick Powell 62-yard run (Jake Gaster kick), 10:40. Tied 7–7. Drive: 2 plays, 75 yards, 0:47.
- ACU – Blayne Taylor 13-yard pass from Maverick McIvor (Ritse Vaes kick), 4:20. Wildcats 14–7. Drive: 14 plays, 66 yards, 6:11.

Second quarter

- ACU – Ritse Vaes 27-yard field goal, 14:09. Wildcats 17–7. Drive: 9 plays, 67 yards, 3:02.
- CARK – ShunDerrick Powell 51-yard run (Jake Gaster kick), 13:04. Wildcats 17–14. Drive: 3 plays, 79 yards, 1:00.
- ACU – Hut Graham 9-yard pass from Maverick McIvor (Ritse Vaes kick), 8:54. Wildcats 24–14. Drive: 9 plays, 54 yards, 4:02.
- ACU – Nehemiah Martinez I 26-yard pass from Maverick McIvor (Ritse Vaes kick), 4:54. Wildcats 31–14. Drive: 8 plays, 59 yards, 2:40.
- CARK – Jake Gaster 26-yard field goal, 0:00. Wildcats 31–17. Drive: 10 plays, 64 yards, 1:40.

Third quarter

- ACU – Ritse Vaes 20-yard field goal, 5:52. Wildcats 34–17. Drive: 5 plays, 77 yards, 2:21.
- CARK – ShunDerrick Powell 11-yard pass from Will McElvain (Jake Gaster kick), 0:36. Wildcats 34–24. Drive: 11 plays, 87 yards, 5:08.

Fourth quarter

- ACU – Nehemiah Martinez I 3-yard pass from Maverick McIvor (Ritse Vaes kick), 12:52. Wildcats 41–24. Drive: 6 plays, 75 yards, 2:44.
- CARK – Jake Gaster 21-yard field goal, 7:49. Wildcats 41–27. Drive: 12 plays, 71 yards, 5:03.
- CARK – Trejan Bridges 11-yard pass from Will McElvain (Jake Gaster kick), 1:38. Wildcats 41–34. Drive: 12 plays, 90 yards, 2:51.

Statistics	UCA	ACU
First downs	31	23
Total yards	528	506
Rushing yards	202	156
Passing yards	326	350
Turnovers	2	0
Time of possession	30:17	29:43

Team	Category	Player	Statistics
Central Arkansas	Passing	Will McElvain	33/46, 326 yards, 2 TD, INT
Central Arkansas	Rushing	ShunDerrick Powell	20 carries, 155 yards, 2 TD
Central Arkansas	Receiving	Malachi Henry	5 receptions, 83 yards
Abilene Christian	Passing	Maverick McIvor	22/36, 350 yards, 5 TD
Abilene Christian	Rushing	Isaiah Johnson	15 carries, 91 yards
Abilene Christian	Receiving	Nehemiah Martinez I	7 receptions, 202 yards, 3 TD

=== vs. West Georgia ===
Game Seven – West Georgia Wolves (1–4) at No. 13 Central Arkansas Bears (4–2) – Game summary

Quarter	1	2	3	4	Total
Wolves	0	0	0	0	0
No. 13 Bears	0	0	0	0	0

at Estes Stadium • Conway, AR

- Date: Saturday October 12, 2024
- Game time: 4:00 p.m.
- Game weather: 0 °F (−18 °C)
- TV announcers (ESPN+): TBD

Game information

First quarter
Second quarter
Third quarter
Fourth quarter

Statistics	UWG	UCA
First downs		
Total yards		
Rushing yards		
Passing yards		
Passing: Comp–Att–Int		
Time of possession		

Team	Category	Player	Statistics
West Georgia	Passing		
West Georgia	Rushing		
West Georgia	Receiving		
Central Arkansas	Passing		
Central Arkansas	Rushing		
Central Arkansas	Receiving		

=== vs. North Alabama ===
Game Eight – North Alabama Lions (3–5) at No. 12 Central Arkansas Bears (5–2) – Game summary

Quarter	1	2	3	4	Total
Lions	0	13	0	6	19
No. 12 Bears	3	7	7	7	24

at Estes Stadium • Conway, AR

- Date: Saturday October 26, 2024
- Game time: 4:00 p.m.
- Game weather: Sunny
- Game attendance: 8,794
- Referee: Matthew Jones
- TV announcers (ESPN+): J.B. Brazeal (play-by-play) and Wess Moore (analyst)

Game information

First quarter

- (2:56) UCA – Jake Gaster 30-yard kick (Drive: 7 plays, 60 yards, 2:33; UCA 3-0)

Second quarter

- (12:18) UCA – Jordan Owens 33-yard pass from Will McElvain (Jake Gaster kick) (Drive: 5 plays, 72 yards, 1:52; UCA 10-0)
- (11:22) UNA – Jalen Fletcher 8-yard rush (Scott Payne kick) (Drive: 2 plays, 12 yards, 0:44; UCA 10-7)
- (5:02) UNA – Tanaka Scott 11-yard pass from TJ Smith (2-point conversion no good) (Drive: 10 plays, 79 yards, 4:21; UNA 13-10)

Third quarter

- (11:35) UCA – Malachi Henry 21-yard pass from Will McElvain (Jake Gaster kick) (Drive: 8 plays, 75 yards, 3:25; UCA 17-13)

Fourth quarter

- (13:47) UCA – Malachi Henry 69-yard pass from Will McElvain (Jake Gaster kick) (Drive: 2 plays, 75 yards, 0:45; UCA 24-13)
- (2:56) UNA – TJ Smith 1-yard rush (2-point conversion no good) (Drive: 12 plays, 80 yards, 3:37; UCA 24-19)

Statistics	UNA	UCA
First downs	24	15
Total yards	353	306
Rushing yards	107	56
Passing yards	246	250
Passing: Comp–Att–Int	17–34–2	21–31–0
Time of possession	30:01	29:59

Team	Category	Player	Statistics
North Alabama	Passing	TJ Smith	14/31, 191 yards, TD, 2 INT
North Alabama	Rushing	Jayvian Allen	12 carries, 65 yards
North Alabama	Receiving	Dakota Warfield	6 receptions, 80 yards
Central Arkansas	Passing	Will McElvain	21/31, 250 yards, 3 TD
Central Arkansas	Rushing	ShunDerrick Powell	14 carries, 70 yards
Central Arkansas	Receiving	Malachi Henry	2 receptions, 90 yards, 2 TD

=== at Utah Tech ===
Game Nine – No. 11 Central Arkansas Bears (6–2) at Utah Tech Trailblazers (0–9) – Game summary

Quarter	1	2	3	4	Total
No. 11 Bears	0	0	0	0	0
Trailblazers	0	0	0	0	0

at Greater Zion Stadium • St. George, UT

- Date: Saturday November 2, 2024
- Game time: 2:00 p.m.
- Game weather: 0 °F (−18 °C)
- TV announcers (ESPN+): TBD

Game information

First quarter
Second quarter
Third quarter
Fourth quarter

Statistics	UCA	UTU
First downs		
Total yards		
Rushing yards		
Passing yards		
Passing: Comp–Att–Int		
Time of possession		

Team	Category	Player	Statistics
Central Arkansas	Passing		
Central Arkansas	Rushing		
Central Arkansas	Receiving		
Utah Tech	Passing		
Utah Tech	Rushing		
Utah Tech	Receiving		

=== at Eastern Kentucky ===
Game Ten – No. 16 Central Arkansas Bears (6–3) vs Eastern Kentucky Colonels (5–4) – Game summary

Quarter	1	2	3	4	Total
No. 16 Bears	0	0	0	0	0
Colonels	0	0	0	0	0

at Roy Kidd Stadium • Richmond, KY

- Date: Saturday November 9, 2024
- Game time: 1:00 p.m.
- TV announcers (ESPN+): TBD

Game information

First quarter
Second quarter
Third quarter
Fourth quarter

Statistics	UCA	EKU
First downs		
Total yards		
Rushing yards		
Passing yards		
Passing: Comp–Att–Int		
Time of possession		

Team	Category	Player	Statistics
Central Arkansas	Passing		
Central Arkansas	Rushing		
Central Arkansas	Receiving		
Eastern Kentucky	Passing		
Eastern Kentucky	Rushing		
Eastern Kentucky	Receiving		

=== vs. Southern Utah ===
Game Eleven – Southern Utah Thunderbirds (5–5) at No. 24 Central Arkansas Bears (6–4) – Game summary

Quarter	1	2	3	4	Total
Thunderbirds	0	0	0	0	0
No. 24 Bears	0	0	0	0	0

at Estes Stadium • Conway, AR

- Date: Saturday November 16, 2024
- Game time: 4:00 p.m.
- Game weather: 0 °F (−18 °C)
- TV announcers (ESPN+): TBD

Game information

First quarter
Second quarter
Third quarter
Fourth quarter

Statistics	SUU	UCA
First downs		
Total yards		
Rushing yards		
Passing yards		
Passing: Comp–Att–Int		
Time of possession		

Team	Category	Player	Statistics
Southern Utah	Passing		
Southern Utah	Rushing		
Southern Utah	Receiving		
Central Arkansas	Passing		
Central Arkansas	Rushing		
Central Arkansas	Receiving		

=== at No. 16 Tarleton State ===
Game Twelve – Central Arkansas Bears (6–5) vs No. 16 Tarleton State Texans (8–3) – Game summary

Quarter	1	2	3	4	Total
Bears	0	0	0	0	0
No. 16 Texans	0	0	0	0	0

at Memorial Stadium • Stephenville, TX

- Date: Saturday November 23, 2024
- Game time: 6:00 p.m.
- TV announcers (ESPN+): TBD

Game information

First quarter
Second quarter
Third quarter
Fourth quarter

Statistics	UCA	TAR
First downs		
Total yards		
Rushing yards		
Passing yards		
Passing: Comp–Att–Int		
Time of possession		

Team	Category	Player	Statistics
Central Arkansas	Passing		
Central Arkansas	Rushing		
Central Arkansas	Receiving		
Tarleton State	Passing		
Tarleton State	Rushing		
Tarleton State	Receiving		
