= 2024 Eastern Kentucky Colonels football team =

American college football season

2024 Eastern Kentucky Colonels football

NCAA Division I First Round, L 17–22 at Villanova
- Conference: United Athletic Conference

Ranking
- STATS: No. 21
- FCS Coaches: No. 25
- Record: 8–5 (6–2 UAC)
- Head coach: Walt Wells (5th season)
- Offensive coordinator: Andy Richman (5th season)
- Defensive coordinator: Jake Johnson (5th season)
- Home stadium: Roy Kidd Stadium

2024 United Athletic Conference standings
	Conf.			Overall
Team	W		L	W		L
No. 14 Abilene Christian $^	7	–	1	9	–	5
No. 13 Tarleton State ^	6	–	2	10	–	4
No. 21 Eastern Kentucky ^	6	–	2	8	–	5
Southern Utah	6	–	2	7	–	5
Central Arkansas	3	–	5	6	–	6
Austin Peay	3	–	5	4	–	8
North Alabama	3	–	5	3	–	9
West Georgia*	1	–	7	4	–	7
Utah Tech	1	–	7	1	–	11
$ – Conference champion; ^ – FCS playoff participant; Note: West Georgia is ineligible for the UAC title and FCS postseason play due to transition from NCAA Division II.; Rankings from STATS Poll

The 2024 Eastern Kentucky Colonels football team represented Eastern Kentucky University as a member of the United Athletic Conference (UAC) during the 2024 NCAA Division I FCS football season. The Colonels were coached by fifth-year head coach Walt Wells and played at Roy Kidd Stadium in Richmond, Kentucky.

== Schedule ==
Date	Time	Opponent	Rank	Site	TV	Result	Attendance
August 31	6:00 p.m.	at Mississippi State*		Davis Wade Stadium; Mississippi State, MS	SECN+/ESPN+	L 7–56	48,724
September 7	7:00 p.m.	at Western Kentucky*		Houchens Industries–L. T. Smith Stadium; Bowling Green, KY (Battle of the Bluegrass)	ESPN+	L 0–31	16,712
September 14	6:00 p.m.	West Georgia		Roy Kidd Stadium; Richmond, KY	ESPN+	W 26–7	6,387
September 21	6:00 p.m.	Morehead State*		Roy Kidd Stadium; Richmond, KY (Old Hawg Rifle)	ESPN+	W 42–13	7,087
September 28	2:00 p.m.	Robert Morris*		Roy Kidd Stadium; Richmond, KY	ESPN+	W 31–7	2,868
October 12	4:00 p.m.	at Southern Utah		Eccles Coliseum; Cedar City, UT	ESPN+	L 21–42	5,134
October 19	4:00 p.m.	at No. 17 Abilene Christian		Wildcat Stadium; Abilene, TX	ESPN+	L 20–34	10,411
October 26	3:00 p.m.	Utah Tech^{†}		Roy Kidd Stadium; Richmond, KY	ESPN+	W 28–17	7,491
November 2	7:00 p.m.	at No. 7 Tarleton State		Memorial Stadium; Stephenville, TX	ESPN+	W 17–13	15,281
November 9	2:00 p.m.	No. 16 Central Arkansas		Roy Kidd Stadium; Richmond, KY	ESPN+	W 31–24	7,902
November 16	2:00 p.m.	at Austin Peay		Fortera Stadium; Clarksville, TN	ESPN+	W 30–27 ^{OT}	6,117
November 23	2:00 p.m.	North Alabama	No. 25	Roy Kidd Stadium; Richmond, KY	ESPN+	W 21–15	4,226
November 30	2:00 p.m.	at No. 12 Villanova*	No. 22	Villanova Stadium; Villanova, PA (NCAA Division I First Round)	ESPN+	L 17–22	1,722
*Non-conference game; ^{†}Homecoming; Rankings from STATS Poll released prior to the game; All times are in Eastern time

== Game summaries ==
=== at Mississippi State (FBS) ===
Game One – Eastern Kentucky Colonels (0–0) vs Mississippi State Bulldogs (FBS) (0–0) – Game summary

Quarter	1	2	3	4	Total
Colonels	0	7	0	0	7
Bulldogs (FBS)	14	21	7	14	56

at Davis Wade Stadium • Starkville, MS

- Date: Saturday August 31, 2024
- Game time: 7:00 p.m.
- Game weather: Sunny • Temperature: 84 °F (29 °C) • Wind: SE 5 mph
- Game attendance: 48,724
- Referee: Wayne Winker
- TV announcers (SECN+/ESPN+): Kevin Fitzgerald (play-by-play) and Charlie Strong (analyst)
- Box Score

Game information
First quarter
- MSST – Jordan Mosley 65-yard pass from Blake Shapen (Kyle Ferrie kick), 14:28. Mississippi St. 7–0. Drive: 3 plays, 75 yards, 0:32.
- MSST – Blake Shapen 4-yard run (Kyle Ferrie kick), 11:07. Mississippi St. 14–0. Drive: 4 plays, 26 yards, 1:04.

Second quarter

- MSST – Creed Whittemore 41-yard run (Kyle Ferrie kick), 11:01. Mississippi St. 21–0. Drive: 5 plays, 47 yards, 2:11.
- MSST – Kevin Coleman Jr. 23-yard pass from Blake Shapen (Kyle Ferrie kick), 7:10. Mississippi St. 28–0. Drive: 5 plays, 48 yards, 1:55.
- MSST – Mario Craver 54-yard pass from Blake Shapen (Kyle Ferrie kick), 3:16. Mississippi St. 35–0. Drive: 2 plays, 54 yards, 0:13.
- EKU – Ron Vann Jr. 9-yard pass from Matt Morrissey (Patrick Nations kick), 0:03. Mississippi St. 35–7. Drive: 14 plays, 75 yards, 3:13.

Third quarter

- MSST – Davon Booth 1-yard run (Kyle Ferrie kick), 7:42. Mississippi St. 42–7. Drive: 10 plays, 65 yards, 3:55.

Fourth quarter

- MSST – Mario Craver 0-yard blocked punt return (Kyle Ferrie kick), 6:58. Mississippi St. 49–7.
- MSST – Elijah Cannon 51-yard interception return (Kyle Ferrie kick), 4:07. Mississippi St. 56–7.

Statistics	EKU	MSST
First downs	16	19
Total yards	295	450
Rushing yards	126	203
Passing yards	169	247
Passing: Comp–Att–Int	22–38–1	15–22–0
Time of possession	38:06	21:54

Team	Category	Player	Statistics
Eastern Kentucky	Passing	Matt Morrissey	22/38, 169 yds, TD, INT
Eastern Kentucky	Rushing	Joshua Carter	19 rushes, 75 yds
Eastern Kentucky	Receiving	Marcus Calwise Jr.	5 receptions, 45 yds
Mississippi State	Passing	Blake Shapen	15/20, 247 yds, 3 TD
Mississippi State	Rushing	Blake Shapen	7 rushes, 44 yds, TD
Mississippi State	Receiving	Jordan Mosley	5 receptions, 104 yds, TD

=== at Western Kentucky (FBS) (Battle of the Bluegrass) ===
Game Two – Eastern Kentucky Colonels (0–1) vs Western Kentucky Hilltoppers (FBS) (0–1) – Game summary

Quarter	1	2	3	4	Total
Colonels	0	0	0	0	0
Hilltoppers (FBS)	10	7	0	14	31

at Houchens Industries-L. T. Smith Stadium • Bowling Green, Kentucky

- Date: Saturday September 7, 2024
- Game time: 7:00 p.m.
- Game weather: Sunny
- Game attendance: 16,712
- Referee: Reed Brotherton
- TV announcers (ESPN+): Steve Schlanger (play-by-play) and Terry Obee (analyst)
- Box Score

Game information
First quarter
- WKU – Lucas Carneiro 29-yard field goal, 12:11. Western Kentucky 3–0. Drive: 10 plays, 64 yards, 2:49.
- WKU – Elijah Young 1-yard run (Lucas Carniero kick), 0:22. Western Kentucky 10–0. Drive: 4 plays, 22 yards, 1:00.

Second quarter

- WKU – L.T. Sanders 2-yard run (Lucas Carniero kick), 3:41. Western Kentucky 17–0. Drive: 9 plays, 84 yards, 3:29.

Third quarter

- No scoring plays.

Fourth quarter

- WKU – Elijah Young 9-yard run (Lucas Carniero kick), 7:07. Western Kentucky 24–0. Drive: 9 plays, 80 yards, 4:20.
- WKU – Dalvin Smith 12-yard pass from TJ Finley (Lucas Carniero kick), 2:38. Western Kentucky 31–0. Drive: 7 plays, 77 yards, 2:19.

Statistics	EKU	WKU
First downs	13	25
Total yards	266	467
Rushing yards	190	116
Passing yards	76	351
Passing: Comp–Att–Int	11–20–0	27–39–0
Time of possession	34:10	25:50

Team	Category	Player	Statistics
Eastern Kentucky	Passing	Matt Morrissey	9/17, 70 yds
Eastern Kentucky	Rushing	Joshua Carter	19 rushes, 100 yds
Eastern Kentucky	Receiving	Marcus Calwise Jr.	4 receptions, 24 yds
Western Kentucky	Passing	TJ Finley	27/39, 351 yds, TD
Western Kentucky	Rushing	Elijah Young	13 rushes, 52 yds, 2 TD
Western Kentucky	Receiving	Kisean Johnson	6 receptions, 119 yds

=== vs. West Georgia ===
Game Three – West Georgia Wolves (1–1) vs Eastern Kentucky Colonels (0–2) – Game summary

Quarter	1	2	3	4	Total
Wolves	0	7	0	0	7
Colonels	3	10	6	7	26

at Roy Kidd Stadium • Richmond, KY

- Date: Saturday September 14, 2024
- Game time: 6:00 p.m.
- Game weather: Sunny • Temperature: 85 °F (29 °C)
- Game attendance: 6,387
- Referee: Matthew Jones
- TV announcers (ESPN+): TBD
- Box Score

Game information
First quarter
- EKU – Patrick Nations 47-yard field goal, 10:03. Eastern Kentucky 3–0. Drive: 7 plays, 56 yards, 2:53.

Second quarter

- EKU – Joshua Carter 9-yard run (Patrick Nations kick), 11:45. Eastern Kentucky 10–0. Drive: 10 plays, 80 yards, 4:38.
- UWG – Rajaez Mosley 4-yard run (Chance Gagnon kick), 7:00. Eastern Kentucky 10–7. Drive: 12 plays, 85 yards, 4:38.
- EKU – Patrick Nations 35-yard field goal, 0:20. Eastern Kentucky 13–7. Drive: 10 plays, 65 yards, 1:48.

Third quarter

- EKU – Caeleb Schlachter 19-yard pass from Matt Morrissey, 5:09. Eastern Kentucky 19–7. Drive: 3 plays, 22 yards, 0:51.

Fourth quarter

- EKU – Jakob Dixon 15-yard pass from Matt Morrissey (Patrick Nations kick), 4:29. Eastern Kentucky 26–7. Drive: 14 plays, 75 yards, 8:44.

Statistics	UWG	EKU
First downs	21	19
Total yards	380	365
Rushing yards	185	88
Passing yards	195	277
Passing: Comp–Att–Int	16–31–0	17–30–0
Time of possession	26:53	33:07

Team	Category	Player	Statistics
West Georgia	Passing	Davin Wydner	16/31, 195 yds
West Georgia	Rushing	Rajaez Mosley	23 rushes, 85 yds, TD
West Georgia	Receiving	Karmello English	9 receptions, 109 yds
Eastern Kentucky	Passing	Matt Morrissey	17/30, 277 yds, 2 TD
Eastern Kentucky	Rushing	Joshua Carter	19 rushes, 61 yds, TD
Eastern Kentucky	Receiving	Jalen Montgomery	1 reception, 46 yds

=== vs. Morehead State (Old Hawg Rifle) ===
Game Four – Morehead State Eagles (2–1) vs Eastern Kentucky Colonels (1–2) – Game summary

Quarter	1	2	3	4	Total
Eagles	3	7	3	0	13
Colonels	14	7	7	14	42

at Roy Kidd Stadium • Richmond, KY

- Date: Saturday September 21, 2024
- Game time: 6:00 p.m.
- Game weather: Cloudy • Temperature: 84 °F (29 °C)
- Game attendance: 7,087
- Referee: Michael Frain
- TV announcers (ESPN+): TBD
- Box Score

Game information
First quarter
- MSU – Thomas Schwartz V 31-yard field goal, 8:44. Morehead State 3–0. Drive: 8 plays, 19 yards, 3:55.
- EKU – Dequan Stanley 21-yard pass from Matt Morrissey (Patrick Nations kick), 3:35. Eastern Kentucky 7–3. Drive: 10 plays, 81 yards, 5:03.
- EKU – Joshua Carter 14-yard run (Patrick Nations kick), 1:15. Eastern Kentucky 14–3. Drive: 2 plays, 22 yards, 0:37.

Second quarter

- MSU – Isaac Stopke 2-yard run (Thomas Schwartz V kick), 11:59. Eastern Kentucky 14–10. Drive: 7 plays, 75 yards, 4:16.
- EKU – Dequan Stanley 27-yard pass from Matt Morrissey (Patrick Nations kick), 4:47. Eastern Kentucky 21–10. Drive: 2 plays, 26 yards, 0:51.

Third quarter

- EKU – Matt Morrissey 1-yard run (Patrick Nations kick), 10:12. Eastern Kentucky 28–10. Drive: 8 plays, 84 yards, 4:41.
- MSU – Thomas Schwartz V 34-yard field goal, 1:18. Eastern Kentucky 28–13. Drive: 9 plays, 63 yards, 3:41.

Fourth quarter

- EKU – Brayden Latham 7-yard run (Patrick Nations kick), 11:23. Eastern Kentucky 35–10. Drive: 9 plays, 85 yards, 4:50.
- EKU – Telly McCallister 11-yard run (Patrick Nations kick), 4:13. Eastern Kentucky 42–10. Drive: 8 plays, 71 yards, 4:06.

Statistics	MORE	EKU
First downs	13	27
Total yards	228	463
Rushing yards	77	301
Passing yards	151	162
Passing: Comp–Att–Int	14–27–2	13–19–0
Time of possession	31:08	28:52

Team	Category	Player	Statistics
Morehead State	Passing	Bryce Patterson	8/14, 106 yds, INT
Morehead State	Rushing	James Louis	13 rushes, 69 yds
Morehead State	Receiving	Nathan Garnett Jr.	4 receptions, 55 yds
Eastern Kentucky	Passing	Matt Morrissey	13/19, 162 yds, 2 TD
Eastern Kentucky	Rushing	Brayden Latham	11 rushes, 76 yds, TD
Eastern Kentucky	Receiving	Dequan Stanley	3 receptions, 49 yds, 2 TD

=== vs. Robert Morris ===
Game Five – Robert Morris Colonials (2–2) vs Eastern Kentucky Colonels (2–2) – Game summary

Quarter	1	2	3	4	Total
Colonials	0	7	0	0	7
Colonels	7	3	14	7	31

at Roy Kidd Stadium • Richmond, KY

- Date: Saturday September 28, 2024
- Game time: 2:00 p.m.
- Game weather: Rain • Temperature: 68 °F (20 °C)
- Game attendance: 2,868
- Referee: Michael Lennie
- TV announcers (ESPN+): TBD
- Box Score

Game information
First quarter
- EKU – Joshua Carter 6-yard run (Patrick Nations kick), 12:11. Eastern Kentucky 7–0. Drive: 8 plays, 75 yards, 2:44.

Second quarter

- RMU – Noah Robinson 19-yard pass from Shawn Charles (Jayson Jenkins kick), 9:59. Tied 7–7. Drive: 6 plays, 43 yards, 2:14.
- EKU – Patrick Nations 23-yard field goal, 0:00. Eastern Kentucky 10–7. Drive: 15 plays, 84 yards, 2:27.

Third quarter

- EKU – Joshua Carter 18-yard run (Patrick Nations kick), 12:17. Eastern Kentucky 17–7. Drive: 6 plays, 75 yards, 2:01.
- EKU – Dequan Stanley 57-yard pass from Matt Morrissey (Patrick Nations kick), 3:52. Eastern Kentucky 24–7. Drive: 6 plays, 92 yards, 3:21.

Fourth quarter

- EKU – Bryant Johnson 9-yard pass from Matt Morrissey (Patrick Nations kick), 12:09. Eastern Kentucky 31–7. Drive: 10 plays, 80 yards, 4:48.

Statistics	RMU	EKU
First downs	17	23
Total yards	232	513
Rushing yards	71	242
Passing yards	161	271
Passing: Comp–Att–Int	19–38–1	18–34–0
Time of possession	28:05	31:55

Team	Category	Player	Statistics
Robert Morris	Passing	Anthony Chiccitt	18/36, 142 yds, INT
Robert Morris	Rushing	Tyvon Edmonds Jr.	14 rushes, 31 yds
Robert Morris	Receiving	Noah Robinson	9 receptions, 89 yds, TD
Eastern Kentucky	Passing	Matt Morrissey	17/29, 265 yds, 2 TD
Eastern Kentucky	Rushing	Joshua Carter	19 rushes, 123 yds, 2 TD
Eastern Kentucky	Receiving	Dequan Stanley	4 receptions, 78 yds, TD

=== at Southern Utah ===
Game Six – Eastern Kentucky Colonels (3–2) at Southern Utah Thunderbirds (2–4) – Game summary

Quarter	1	2	3	4	Total
Colonels	0	6	8	7	21
Thunderbirds	7	7	14	14	42

at Eccles Coliseum • Cedar City, UT

- Date: Saturday October 12, 2024
- Game time: 4:00 p.m.
- Game weather: Sunny • Temperature: 75 °F (24 °C) • Wind: NE 13 miles per hour (21 km/h)
- Game attendance: 5,134
- Referee: John Kellermeier
- TV: ESPN+
- Box Score

Game information
First quarter
- SUU – Targhee Lambson 3-yard run (Jayden Rogers kick), 4:31. Southern Utah 7–0. Drive: 12 plays, 69 yards, 6:06.

Second quarter

- EKU – Patrick Nations 34-yard field goal, 14:01. Southern Utah 7–3. Drive: 16 plays, 58 yards, 5:30.
- SUU – Gabe Nunez 11-yard pass from Jackson Berry (Jayden Rogers kick), 6:03. Southern Utah 14–3. Drive: 12 plays, 75 yards, 7:58.
- EKU – Patrick Nations 47-yard field goal, 0:02. Southern Utah 14–6. Drive: 6 plays, 45 yards, 0:38.

Third quarter

- EKU – Joshua Carter 2-yard run (Jeremiah Bailey pass), 11:23. Tied 14–14. Drive: 7 plays, 75 yards, 3:37.
- SUU – Devin Downing 12-yard pass from Jackson Berry (Jayden Rogers kick), 7:21. Southern Utah 21–14. Drive: 9 plays, 75 yards, 4:02.
- SUU – Targhee Lambson 8-yard run (Jayden Rogers kick), 3:13. Southern Utah 28–14. Drive: 7 plays, 31 yards, 3:32.

Fourth quarter

- SUU – Shane Carr 38-yard pass from Jackson Berry (Jayden Rogers kick), 8:49. Southern Utah 35–14. Drive: 9 plays, 88 yards, 4:59.
- EKU – Dequan Stanley 9-yard pass from Matt Morrissey (Patrick Nations kick), 5:55. Southern Utah 35–21. Drive: 8 plays, 60 yards, 2:50.
- SUU – Targhee Lambson 1-yard run (Jayden Rogers kick), 1:58. Southern Utah 42–21. Drive: 9 plays, 75 yards, 3:57.

Statistics	EKU	SUU
First downs	23	27
Total yards	276	482
Rushing yards	69	278
Passing yards	207	204
Passing: Comp–Att–Int	24–36–1	13–23–0
Time of possession	23:18	36:42

Team	Category	Player	Statistics
Eastern Kentucky	Passing	Matt Morrissey	24/36, 207 yds, TD, INT
Eastern Kentucky	Rushing	Joshua Carter	11 rushes, 43 yds, TD
Eastern Kentucky	Receiving	Dequan Stanley	6 receptions, 47 yds, TD
Southern Utah	Passing	Jackson Berry	13/23, 204 yds, 3 TD
Southern Utah	Rushing	Targhee Lambson	34 rushes, 170 yds, 3 TD
Southern Utah	Receiving	Devin Downing	3 receptions, 69 yds, TD

=== at No. 17 Abilene Christian ===
Game Seven – Eastern Kentucky Colonels (3–3) at No. 17 Abilene Christian Wildcats (4–3) – Game summary

Quarter	1	2	3	4	Total
Colonels	0	7	13	0	20
No. 17 Wildcats	0	14	14	6	34

at Wildcat Stadium, Abilene, Texas

- Date: Saturday October 19, 2024
- Game time: 4:00 pm
- Game weather: Sunny
- Game attendance: 10,411
- Referee: Zach Erdmann
- TV announcers (ESPN+): Grant Boone (play-by-play) and Bob Shipley (analyst)
- Box Score

Game information
First quarter
- No scoring plays.

Second quarter

- ACU – Sam Hicks 8-yard run (Ritse Vaes kick), 14:55. Abilene Christian 7–0. Drive: 11 plays, 87 yards, 4:14.
- ACU – Jed Castles 18-yard pass from Maverick McIvor (Ritse Vaes kick), 8:44. Abilene Christian 14–0. Drive: 8 plays, 80 yards, 3:41.
- EKU – Marcus Calwise Jr. 8-yard pass from Matt Morrissey (Patrick Nations kick), 0:29. Abilene Christian 14–7. Drive: 10 plays, 58 yards, 5:55.

Third quarter

- ACU – Blayne Taylor 45-yard pass from Maverick McIvor (Ritse Vaes kick), 13:22. Abilene Christian 21–7. Drive: 4 plays, 75 yards, 1:38.
- EKU – Dequan Stanley 75-yard pass from Matt Morrissey (Patrick Nations kick), 13:12. Abilene Christian 21–14. Drive: 1 play, 75 yards, 0:10.
- EKU – Joshua Carter 3-yard run, 5:17. Abilene Christian 21–20. Drive: 12 plays, 78 yards, 6:28.
- ACU – Blayne Taylor 11-yard pass from Maverick McIvor (Ritse Vaes kick), 1:27. Abilene Christian 28–20. Drive: 10 plays, 75 yards, 3:50.

Fourth quarter

- ACU – Ritse Vaes 21-yard field goal, 12:55. Abilene Christian 31–20. Drive: 7 plays, 16 yards, 2:41.
- ACU – Ritse Vaes 35-yard field goal, 2:17. Abilene Christian 34–20. Drive: 11 plays, 78 yards, 6:07.

Statistics	EKU	ACU
First downs	19	27
Total yards	357	552
Rushing yards	92	212
Passing yards	265	340
Passing: Comp–Att–Int	20–33–3	24–37–1
Time of possession	29:24	30:36

Team	Category	Player	Statistics
Eastern Kentucky	Passing	Matt Morrissey	20/33, 265 yds, 2 TD, 3 INT
Eastern Kentucky	Rushing	Joshua Carter	16 rushes, 79 yds, TD
Eastern Kentucky	Receiving	Dequan Stanley	5 receptions, 116 yds, TD
Abilene Christian	Passing	Maverick McIvor	24/37, 340 yds, 3 TD, INT
Abilene Christian	Rushing	Sam Hicks	24 rushes, 146 yds, TD
Abilene Christian	Receiving	Blayne Taylor	10 receptions, 154 yds, 2 TD

=== vs. Utah Tech ===
Game Eight – Utah Tech Trailblazers (0–8) vs Eastern Kentucky Colonels (3–4) – Game summary

Quarter	1	2	3	4	Total
Trailblazers	0	3	7	7	17
Colonels	0	14	7	7	28

at Roy Kidd Stadium • Richmond, KY

- Date: Saturday October 26, 2024
- Game time: 3:00 p.m.
- Game weather: Cloudy • Temperature: 65 °F (18 °C)
- Game attendance: 7,491
- Referee: Branden McCain
- TV announcers (ESPN+): TBD
- Box Score

Game information
First quarter
- No scoring plays

Second quarter

- UTU – Ilya Uvaydov 24-yard field goal, 11:29. Utah Tech 3–0. Drive: 10 plays, 87 yards, 3:35.
- EKU – Joshua Carter 1-yard run (Patrick Nations kick), 4:42. Eastern Kentucky 7–3. Drive: 6 plays, 52 yards, 2:46.
- EKU – Maddox Marcellus 23-yard fumble recovery (Patrick Nations kick), 3:57. Eastern Kentucky 14–3.

Third quarter

- EKU – Cameron Hergott 1-yard run (Patrick Nations kick), 8:44. Eastern Kentucky 21–3. Drive: 14 plays, 75 yards, 6:16.
- UTU – Bryce Parker 9-yard pass from Bronson Barben (Ilya Uvaydov kick), 4:05. Eastern Kentucky 21–10. Drive: 9 plays, 75 yards, 4:39.

Fourth quarter

- EKU – Joshua Carter 6-yard run (Patrick Nations kick), 2:27. Eastern Kentucky 28–10. Drive: 10 plays, 71 yards, 5:16.
- UTU – Eni Falayi 11-yard pass from Bronson Barben (Ilya Uvaydov kick), 1:13. Eastern Kentucky 28–17. Drive: 8 plays, 75 yards, 1:14.

Statistics	UTU	EKU
First downs	21	24
Total yards	346	362
Rushing yards	115	287
Passing yards	231	75
Passing: Comp–Att–Int	22–40–0	10–18–0
Time of possession	26:19	33:41

Team	Category	Player	Statistics
Utah Tech	Passing	Bronson Barben	22/39, 231 yds, 2 TD
Utah Tech	Rushing	Bronson Barben	13 rushes, 37 yds
Utah Tech	Receiving	Josh Rillos	7 receptions, 72 yds
Eastern Kentucky	Passing	Matt Morrissey	10/18, 75 yds
Eastern Kentucky	Rushing	Joshua Carter	31 rushes, 167 yds, 2 TD
Eastern Kentucky	Receiving	Ron Vann Jr.	4 receptions, 33 yds

=== at No. 7 Tarleton State ===
Game Nine – Eastern Kentucky Colonels (4–4) vs No. 7 Tarleton State Texans (7–1) – Game summary

Quarter	1	2	3	4	Total
Colonels	0	7	3	7	17
No. 7 Texans	7	6	0	0	13

at Memorial Stadium • Stephenville, TX

- Date: Saturday November 2, 2024
- Game time: 7:00 p.m.
- Game weather: Cloudy • Temperature: 77 °F (25 °C) • Wind: SE 14 miles per hour (23 km/h)
- Game attendance: 15,281
- Referee: Brad Carrell
- TV announcers (ESPN+): Greg Stotelmyer (play-by-play), Wes Chandler and Jim Trey (analysts)
- Box Score

Game information
First quarter
- TSU – Cody Jackson 23-yard pass from Victor Gabalis (Corbin Poston kick), 4:03. Tarleton State 7–0. Drive: 9 plays, 89 yards, 4:18.

Second quarter

- TSU – Corbin Poston 24-yard field goal, 14:49. Tarleton State 10–0. Drive: 7 plays, 62 yards, 2:08.
- EKU – Joshua Carter 1-yard run (Patrick Nations kick), 7:10. Tarleton State 10–7. Drive: 1 play, 1 yard, 0:05.
- TSU – Corbin Poston 42-yard field goal, 0:20. Tarleton State 13–7. Drive: 13 plays, 62 yards, 3:04.

Third quarter

- EKU – Patrick Nations 34-yard field goal, 7:48. Tarleton State 13–10. Drive: 7 plays, 23 yards, 2:57.

Fourth quarter

- EKU – Joshua Carter 23-yard run (Patrick Nations kick), 2:26. Eastern Kentucky 17–13. Drive: 4 plays, 62 yards, 1:48.

Statistics	EKU	TAR
First downs	16	22
Total yards	274	397
Rushing yards	243	163
Passing yards	31	234
Passing: Comp–Att–Int	6–11–1	17–41–3
Time of possession	33:46	25:41

Team	Category	Player	Statistics
Eastern Kentucky	Passing	Matt Morrissey	6/11, 31 yds, INT
Eastern Kentucky	Rushing	Joshua Carter	22 rushes, 147 yds, 2 TD
Eastern Kentucky	Receiving	Caeleb Schlachter	1 reception, 11 yds
Tarleton State	Passing	Victor Gabalis	17/41, 234 yds, TD, 3 INT
Tarleton State	Rushing	Kayvon Britten	25 rushes, 154 yds
Tarleton State	Receiving	Benjamin Omayebu	9 receptions, 100 yds

=== vs. No. 16 Central Arkansas ===
Game Ten – No. 16 Central Arkansas Bears (6–3) vs Eastern Kentucky Colonels (5–4) – Game summary

Quarter	1	2	3	4	Total
No. 16 Bears	10	7	7	0	24
Colonels	7	10	7	7	31

at Roy Kidd Stadium • Richmond, KY

- Date: Saturday November 9, 2024
- Game time: 2:00 pm
- Game weather: Sunny • Temperature: 63 °F (17 °C) • Wind: E 8 miles per hour (13 km/h)
- Game attendance: 7,902
- Referee: Drew Myers
- TV announcers (ESPN+): TBD
- Box Score

Game information
First quarter
- UCA – Jake Gaster 23-yard field goal, 10:37. Central Arkansas 3–0. Drive: 9 plays, 76 yards, 4:19.
- UCA – Malachi Henry 2-yard pass from Will McElvain (Jake Gaster kick), 4:45. Central Arkansas 10–0. Drive: 7 plays, 31 yards, 2:35.
- EKU – Brayden Latham 39-yard run (Patrick Nations kick), 2:17. Central Arkansas 10–7. Drive: 5 plays, 77 yards, 2:28.

Second quarter

- EKU – Marcus Calwise Jr. 12-yard pass from Matt Morrissey (Patrick Nations kick), 14:55. Eastern Kentucky 14–10. Drive: 3 plays, 15 yards, 0:39.
- UCA – Trejan Bridges 17-yard pass from Will McElvain (Jake Gaster kick), 9:06. Central Arkansas 17–14. Drive: 5 plays, 63 yards, 2:07.
- EKU – Patrick Nations 21-yard field goal, 1:10. Tied 17–17. Drive: 4 plays, 8 yards, 0:54.

Third quarter

- EKU – Caeleb Schlachter 73-yard kickoff return (Patrick Nations kick), 14:51. Eastern Kentucky 24–17.
- UCA – Trejan Bridges 30-yard pass from Will McElvain (Jake Gaster kick), 13:39. Tied 24–24. Drive: 3 plays, 75 yards, 1:12.

Fourth quarter

- EKU – Joshua Carter 3-yard run (Patrick Nations kick), 2:24. Eastern Kentucky 31–24. Drive: 9 plays, 70 yards, 4:19.

Statistics	UCA	EKU
First downs	25	14
Total yards	458	268
Rushing yards	201	160
Passing yards	257	108
Passing: Comp–Att–Int	21–36–1	10–20–0
Time of possession	31:26	28:34

Team	Category	Player	Statistics
Central Arkansas	Passing	Will McElvain	10/14, 113 yds, 2 TD
Central Arkansas	Rushing	Darius Hale	16 rushes, 90 yds
Central Arkansas	Receiving	Trejan Bridges	8 receptions, 143 yds, 2 TD
Eastern Kentucky	Passing	Matt Morrissey	10/20, 108 yds, TD
Eastern Kentucky	Rushing	Brayden Latham	11 rushes, 73 yds, TD
Eastern Kentucky	Receiving	Marcus Calwise Jr.	3 receptions, 37 yds, TD

=== at Austin Peay ===
Game Eleven – Eastern Kentucky Colonels (6–4) vs Austin Peay Governors (4–6) – Game summary

Quarter	1	2	3	4	OT	Total
Colonels	7	0	3	14	6	30
Governors	10	14	0	0	3	27

at Fortera Stadium • Clarksville, TN

- Date: Saturday November 16, 2024
- Game time: 2:00 p.m.
- Game weather: Sunny • Temperature: 63 °F (17 °C) • Wind: E 5 miles per hour (8.0 km/h)
- Game attendance: 6,117
- Referee: Gabriel Tomlin
- TV announcers (ESPN+): TBD
- Box Score

Game information
First quarter
- AP – Carson Smith 31-yard field goal, 9:39. Austin Peay 3–0. Drive: 10 plays, 65 yards, 5:14.
- AP – Jackson Head 2-yard pass from Austin Smith (Carson Smith kick), 7:15. Austin Peay 10–0. Drive: 5 plays, 31 yards, 2:17.
- EKU – Joshua Carter 1-yard run (Patrick Nations kick), 0:09. Austin Peay 10–7. Drive: 13 plays, 81 yards, 6:57.

Second quarter

- AP – Jaden Barnes 60-yard pass from Austin Smith (Carson Smith kick), 12:26. Austin Peay 17–7. Drive: 1 play, 60 yards, 0:09.
- AP – Romon Copeland Jr. 1-yard run (Carson Smith kick), 0:49. Austin Peay 24–7. Drive: 7 plays, 55 yards, 1:22.

Third quarter

- EKU – Patrick Nations 36-yard field goal, 3:42. Austin Peay 24–10. Drive: 13 plays, 51 yards, 6:08.

Fourth quarter

- EKU – Marcus Calwise Jr. 13-yard pass from Matt Morrissey (Patrick Nations kick), 13:00. Austin Peay 24–17. Drive: 9 plays, 77 yards, 4:02.
- EKU – Matt Morrissey 1-yard run (Patrick Nations kick), 0:13. Tied 24–24. Drive: 9 plays, 45 yards, 3:03.

Overtime

- AP – Carson Smith 23-yard field goal. Austin Peay 27–24. Drive: 6 plays, 19 yards.
- EKU – Joshua Carter 23-yard run. Eastern Kentucky 30–27. Drive: 2 plays, 25 yards.

Statistics	EKU	APSU
First downs	27	12
Total yards	402	287
Rushing yards	172	48
Passing yards	230	239
Passing: Comp–Att–Int	21–33–1	23–35–0
Time of possession	38:16	21:44

Team	Category	Player	Statistics
Eastern Kentucky	Passing	Matt Morrissey	21/33, 230 yds, TD, INT
Eastern Kentucky	Rushing	Joshua Carter	26 rushes, 106 yds, 2 TD
Eastern Kentucky	Receiving	Marcus Calwise Jr.	6 receptions, 83 yds, TD
Austin Peay	Passing	Austin Smith	23/35, 239 yds, 2 TD
Austin Peay	Rushing	La'Vell Wright	8 rushes, 16 yds
Austin Peay	Receiving	Jaden Barnes	8 receptions, 131 yds, TD

=== vs. North Alabama ===
Game Twelve – North Alabama Lions (3–8) vs No. 25 Eastern Kentucky Colonels (7–4) – Game summary

Quarter	1	2	3	4	Total
Lions	0	0	8	7	15
No. 25 Colonels	0	14	0	7	21

at Roy Kidd Stadium • Richmond, KY

- Date: Saturday November 23, 2024
- Game time: 2:00 p.m.
- Game weather: Cloudy • Temperature: 42 °F (6 °C) • Wind: W 7 miles per hour (11 km/h)
- Game attendance: 4,226
- Referee: Zach Erdmann
- TV announcers (ESPN+): Greg Stotelymyer (play-by-play), Wes Chandler and Jim Tirey (analysts)
- Box Score

Game information
First quarter
- No scoring plays

Second quarter

- EKU – Matt Morrissey 2-yard run (Patrick Nations kick), 9:36. Eastern Kentucky 7–0. Drive: 10 plays, 91 yards, 5:07.
- EKU – Brayden Latham 2-yard run (Patrick Nations kick), 0:34. Eastern Kentucky 14–0. Drive: 16 plays, 98 yards, 6:25.

Third quarter

- UNA – Tanaka Scott 24-yard pass from TJ Smith (Jayvian Allen rush), 3:38. Eastern Kentucky 14–8. Drive: 12 plays, 88 yards, 7:34.

Fourth quarter

- UNA – TJ Smith 18-yard run (Scott Payne kick), 10:37. North Alabama 15–14. Drive: 11 plays, 83 yards, 4:52.
- EKU – Marcus Calwise Jr. 67-yard pass from Matt Morrissey (Patrick Nations kick), 8:10. Eastern Kentucky 21–15. Drive: 4 plays, 79 yards, 2:18.

Statistics	UNA	EKU
First downs	26	16
Total yards	441	395
Rushing yards	116	241
Passing yards	325	154
Passing: Comp–Att–Int	23–39–2	9–15–1
Time of possession	31:55	28:05

Team	Category	Player	Statistics
North Alabama	Passing	TJ Smith	23/39, 325 yds, TD, 2 INT
North Alabama	Rushing	Jayvian Allen	17 rushes, 79 yds
North Alabama	Receiving	Tanaka Scott	6 receptions, 109 yds, TD
Eastern Kentucky	Passing	Matt Morrissey	9/15, 154 yds, TD, INT
Eastern Kentucky	Rushing	Brayden Latham	19 rushes, 103 yds, TD
Eastern Kentucky	Receiving	Marcus Calwise Jr.	5 receptions, 99 yds, TD

=== at No. 12 Villanova (NCAA Division I playoff–first round) ===
Game Thirteen – No. 22 Eastern Kentucky (8–4) at No. 12 Villanova Wildcats (9–3) – Game summary

Quarter	1	2	3	4	Total
No. 22 Colonels	14	3	0	0	17
No. 12 Wildcats	0	9	7	6	22

at Villanova Stadium, Villanova, PA

- Date: Saturday November 30, 2024
- Game time: 2:00 p.m.
- Game weather: Sunny
- Game attendance: 1,722
- Referee: Jason Soistman
- TV announcers (ESPN+): Mike Corey (play-by-play) and Jordan Reid (analyst)

Game information

First quarter
Second quarter
Third quarter
Fourth quarter

Statistics	EKU	VILL
First downs	19	20
Total yards	286	324
Rushing yards	211	147
Passing yards	75	177
Passing: Comp–Att–Int	9-27-0	14-24-1
Time of possession	27:33	32:27

Team	Category	Player	Statistics
Eastern Kentucky	Passing	Matt Morrissey	9/27, 75 yards, TD
Eastern Kentucky	Rushing	Joshua Carter	21 carries, 150 yards, TD
Eastern Kentucky	Receiving	Joshua Carter	4 receptions, 43 yards
Villanova	Passing	Connor Watkins	14/24, 177 yards, 2 TD, INT
Villanova	Rushing	David Avit	17 carries, 94 yards
Villanova	Receiving	David Avit	2 receptions, 75 yards
