= 2024 West Georgia Wolves football team =

American college football season

2024 West Georgia Wolves football
- Conference: United Athletic Conference
- Record: 4–7 (1–7 UAC)
- Head coach: Joel Taylor (1st season)
- Offensive coordinator: Dane Stevens (1st season)
- Defensive coordinator: Mike Adams (1st season)
- Home stadium: University Stadium

2024 United Athletic Conference standings
	Conf.			Overall
Team	W		L	W		L
No. 14 Abilene Christian $^	7	–	1	9	–	5
No. 13 Tarleton State ^	6	–	2	10	–	4
No. 21 Eastern Kentucky ^	6	–	2	8	–	5
Southern Utah	6	–	2	7	–	5
Central Arkansas	3	–	5	6	–	6
Austin Peay	3	–	5	4	–	8
North Alabama	3	–	5	3	–	9
West Georgia*	1	–	7	4	–	7
Utah Tech	1	–	7	1	–	11
$ – Conference champion; ^ – FCS playoff participant; Note: West Georgia is ineligible for the UAC title and FCS postseason play due to transition from NCAA Division II.; Rankings from STATS Poll

The 2024 West Georgia Wolves football team represented the University of West Georgia as a member of the United Athletic Conference (UAC) during the 2024 NCAA Division I FCS football season. The Wolves were coached by first-year head coach Joel Taylor and played at University Stadium in Carrollton, Georgia.

== Offseason ==
=== Transfers ===
==== Transfers in ====
The Wolves added thirteen players via transfer.

Name	Number	Pos.	Height	Weight	Year	Hometown	Transfer from
Quincy Casey	#8	QB	6'1"	180	Senior	Memphis, Tennessee	Alabama A&M
Jordan Mitchell	#9	LB	5'9"	209	Senior	Beulaville, North Carolina	Alabama A&M
DeAndre Jones	#55	DL	6'5"	283	Redshirt Freshman	Douglasville, Georgia	Chattanooga
Kyeaure Magloire	#34	CB	6'1"	190	Junior	Minneola, Florida	Eastern Kentucky
Malik Charles	#73	DL	6'4"	245	Sophomore	Mesa, Arizona	Northern Arizona
Warren-Stevens Tayou	#99	DL	6'2"	255	Junior	Inglewood, California	Northern Arizona
Malachi Williams	#34	DB	6'0"	195	Junior	San Diego, California	Northern Arizona
Bryce Dickerson	#86	TE	6'4"	240	Junior	Bowman, Georgia	Wofford
Julian Richardson	#7	LB	6'3"	235	Senior	Albany, Georgia	Akron
Tysheik Galloway	#7	DL	6'0"	300	Senior	Anderson, South Carolina	Liberty
David Stanphill	#95	LS	5'7"	145	Sophomore	St. Simons, Georgia	Navy
Cedric Seabrough	#14	TE	6'3"	225	Sophomore	Swainsboro, Georgia	NC State
Davin Wydner	#17	QB	6'5"	220	Redshirt Freshman	Cocoa, Florida	Ole Miss

== Schedule ==
Date	Time	Opponent	Site	TV	Result	Attendance
August 31	6:00 p.m.	Samford*	University Stadium; Carrollton, GA	ESPN+	W 38–29	4,329
September 7	8:00 p.m.	at Abilene Christian	Wildcat Stadium; Abilene, TX	ESPN+	L 24–38	7,094
September 14	6:00 p.m.	at Eastern Kentucky	Roy Kidd Stadium; Richmond, KY	ESPN+	L 7–26	6,387
September 28	2:00 p.m.	North Alabama	University Stadium; Carrollton, GA	ESPN+	L 16–25	3,957
October 5	2:00 p.m.	Austin Peay	University Stadium; Carrollton, GA	ESPN+	L 16–20	2,674
October 12	5:00 p.m.	at No. 12 Central Arkansas	Estes Stadium; Conway, AR	ESPN+	L 33–34	4,630
October 19	2:00 p.m.	Shorter*^{†}	University Stadium; Carrollton, GA	ESPN+	W 41–13	5,327
October 26	2:00 p.m.	Southern Utah	University Stadium; Carrollton, GA	ESPN+	L 17–28	2,243
November 2	2:00 p.m.	Lincoln (CA)*	University Stadium; Carrollton, GA	ESPN+	W 88–12	1,812
November 9	2:00 p.m.	No. 14 Tarleton State	University Stadium; Carrollton, GA	ESPN+	L 21–38	2,634
November 16	4:00 p.m.	at Utah Tech	Greater Zion Stadium; St. George, UT	ESPN+	W 34–31	2,791
*Non-conference game; ^{†}Homecoming; Rankings from STATS Poll released prior to the game; All times are in Eastern time

== Game summaries ==
=== vs. Samford ===
Game One – Samford Bulldogs (0-0) at West Georgia Wolves (0-0) – Game summary

Quarter	1	2	3	4	Total
Bulldogs	7	7	15	0	29
Wolves	14	12	0	12	38

at University Stadium • Carrollton, GA

- Date: August 31
- Game time: 6:00 p.m.
- Game weather: Wind: S at 4 miles per hour (6.4 km/h) • Weather: Cloudy • Temp: 88 °F (31 °C)
- Game attendance: 4,329
- Referee: Gabriel Maddox
- TV announcers (ESPN+): Logan Maddox, Parker Gore, and Carlie Fair

Game information

First quarter

- (13:49) UWG – Chase Belcher 3-yard run (Chance Gagnon kick) (Drive: 3 plays, 75 yards, 1:11; UWG 7-0)
- (11:04) SAM – Quincy Crittendon 1-yard run (Forrest Taylor kick) (Drive: 8 plays, 70 yards, 2:38; Tie 7-7)
- (4:41) UWG – Bryce Dickerson 29-yard pass from Davin Wydner (Chance Gagnon kick) (Drive: 13 plays, 75 yards, 6:23; UWG 14-7)

Second quarter

- (13:08) UWG – Chance Gagnon 49-yard field goal (Drive: 9 plays, 29 yards, 4:25; UWG 17-7)
- (8:43) SAM – Damonta Witherspoon 3-yard pass from Quincy Crittendon (Forrest Taylor kick) (Drive: 10 plays, 70 yards, 4:18; UWG 17-14)
- (2:18) UWG – Chance Gagnon 28-yard field goal (Drive: 15 plays, 66 yards, 6:19; UWG 20-14)
- (0:00) UWG – Dylan Gary 44-yard pass from Davin Wydner (Chance Gagnon kick no good) (Drive: 5 plays, 75 yards, 0:49; UWG 26-14)

Third quarter

- (8:41) SAM – Quincy Crittendon 3-yard run (Forrest Taylor kick) (Drive: 19 plays, 71 yards, 6:14; UWG 26-21)
- (5:54) SAM – Brendan Jenkins 68-yard pass from Quincy Crittendon (E. Jai Mason rush) (Drive: 1 play, 68 yards, 0:13; SAM 29-26)

Fourth quarter

- (13:40) UWG – Chase Belcher 4-yard run (Chance Gagnon kick blocked) (Drive: 7 plays, 30 yards, 2:26; UWG 32-29)
- (8:18) UWG – Davin Wydner 21-yard run (Chance Gagnon kick no good) (Drive: 8 plays, 87 yards, 3:45; UWG 38-29)

Statistics	SAM	UWG
First downs	25	24
Total yards	465	456
Rushing yards	163	185
Passing yards	302	271
Passing: Comp–Att–Int	24-41-1	24-35
Time of possession	25:01	34:59

Team	Category	Player	Statistics
Samford	Passing	Quincy Crittendon	24/41, 302 yards, 2 TD, 1 INT
Samford	Rushing	Quincy Crittendon	19 carries, 95 yards, 2 TD
Samford	Receiving	Brendan Jenkins	4 receptions, 81 yards, 1 TD
West Georgia	Passing	Davin Wydner	24/35, 271 yards, 2 TD
West Georgia	Rushing	Rajaez Mosley	23 carries, 66 yards
West Georgia	Receiving	Karmello English	6 receptions, 108 yards

=== at Abilene Christian ===
Game Two – West Georgia Wolves (1–0) at Abilene Christian Wildcats (0–1) – Game summary

Quarter	1	2	3	4	Total
Wolves	0	3	7	14	24
Wildcats	14	0	7	17	38

at Wildcat Stadium, Abilene, Texas

- Date: September 7
- Game time: 7:00 p.m. CDT
- Game weather: Sunny
- Game attendance: 7,094
- Referee: Michael Frain
- TV announcers (ESPN+): Grant Boone, Bob Shipley

Game information
First quarter
- ACU – Sam Hicks 27-yard run (Ritse Vaes kick), 12:24. Wildcats 7–0. Drive: 7 plays, 77 yards, 2:31.
- ACU – Nehemiah Martinez I 20-yard pass from Maverick McIvor (Ritse Vaes kick), 2:18. Wildcats 14–0. Drive: 10 plays, 67 yards, 4:28.

Second quarter

- UWG – Chance Gagnon 31-yard field goal, 11:22. Wildcats 14–3. Drive: 7 plays, 17 yards, 2:35.

Third quarter

- ACU – Nehemiah Martinez I 72-yard pass from Maverick McIvor (Ritse Vaes kick), 11:38. Wildcats 21–3. Drive: 2 plays, 73 yards, 0:50.
- UWG – Dylan Gary 27-yard pass from Quincy Casey (Chance Gagnon kick), 5:20. Wildcats 21–10. Drive: 1 play, 27 yards, 0:06.

Fourth quarter

- ACU – Ritse Vaes 27-yard field goal, 12:31. Wildcats 24–10. Drive: 16 plays, 81 yards, 7:47.
- UWG – Dylan Gary 22-yard pass from Quincy Casey (Chance Gagnon kick), 10:02. Wildcats 24–17. Drive: 9 plays, 80 yards, 2:22.
- ACU – Isaiah Johnson 3-yard run (Ritse Vaes kick), 5:01. Wildcats 31–17. Drive: 10 plays, 75 yards, 4:55.
- ACU – Bryan Henry 18-yard pass from Maverick McIvor (Ritse Vaes kick), 3:35. Wildcats 38–17. Drive: 4 plays, 31 yards, 1:16.
- UWG – Quincy Casey 2-yard run (Chance Gagnon kick), 0:01. Wildcats 38–24. Drive: 13 plays, 75 yards, 3:34.

Statistics	UWG	ACU
First downs	22	28
Total yards	344	499
Rushing yards	102	202
Passing yards	242	297
Turnovers	1	2
Time of possession	26:06	33:54

Team	Category	Player	Statistics
West Georgia	Passing	Quincy Casey	14/34, 201 yards, 2 TD, INT
West Georgia	Rushing	Quincy Casey	9 rushes, 50 yards, TD
West Georgia	Receiving	Dylan Gary	7 receptions, 153 yards, 2 TD
Abilene Christian	Passing	Maverick McIvor	24/37, 297 yards, 3 TD
Abilene Christian	Rushing	Isaiah Johnson	14 rushes, 71 yards, TD
Abilene Christian	Receiving	Nehemiah Martinez I	7 receptions, 132 yards, 2 TD

=== at Eastern Kentucky ===
Game Three – West Georgia Wolves (1–1) vs Eastern Kentucky Colonels (0–2) – Game summary

Quarter	1	2	3	4	Total
Wolves	0	7	0	0	7
Colonels	3	10	6	7	26

at Roy Kidd Stadium • Richmond, KY

- Date: Saturday September 14, 2024
- Game time: 6:00 p.m.
- Game weather: Sunny • Temperature: 85 °F (29 °C)
- Game attendance: 6,387
- Referee: Matthew Jones
- TV announcers (ESPN+): Greg Stotelmyer, Wes Chandler, Jim Tirey

Game information

First quarter

- EKU – Patrick Nations 47-yard field goal, 10:03. Eastern Kentucky 3–0. Drive: 7 plays, 56 yards, 2:53.

Second quarter

- EKU – Joshua Carter 9-yard run (Patrick Nations kick), 11:45. Eastern Kentucky 10–0. Drive: 10 plays, 80 yards, 4:38.
- UWG – Rajaez Mosley 4-yard run (Chance Gagnon kick), 7:00. Eastern Kentucky 10–7. Drive: 12 plays, 85 yards, 4:38.
- EKU – Patrick Nations 35-yard field goal, 0:20. Eastern Kentucky 13–7. Drive: 10 plays, 65 yards, 1:48.

Third quarter

- EKU – Caeleb Schlachter 19-yard pass from Matt Morrissey, 5:09. Eastern Kentucky 19–7. Drive: 3 plays, 22 yards, 0:51.

Fourth quarter

- EKU – Jakob Dixon 15-yard pass from Matt Morrissey (Patrick Nations kick), 4:29. Eastern Kentucky 26–7. Drive: 14 plays, 75 yards, 8:44.

Statistics	UWG	EKU
First downs	21	19
Total yards	380	365
Rushing yards	185	88
Passing yards	195	277
Passing: Comp–Att–Int	16–31–0	17–30–0
Time of possession	26:53	33:07

Team	Category	Player	Statistics
West Georgia	Passing	Davin Wydner	16/31, 195 yds
West Georgia	Rushing	Rajaez Mosley	23 rushes, 85 yds, TD
West Georgia	Receiving	Karmello English	9 receptions, 109 yds
Eastern Kentucky	Passing	Matt Morrissey	17/30, 277 yds, 2 TD
Eastern Kentucky	Rushing	Joshua Carter	19 rushes, 61 yds, TD
Eastern Kentucky	Receiving	Jalen Montgomery	1 reception, 46 yds

=== vs. North Alabama ===
Game Four – North Alabama Lions (0–5) at West Georgia Wolves (1–2) – Game summary

Quarter	1	2	3	4	Total
Lions	3	10	7	5	25
Wolves	0	13	0	3	16

at University Stadium • Carrollton, GA

- Date: Saturday September 28, 2024
- Game time: 2:00 p.m.
- Game weather: SW at 8 miles per hour (13 km/h) • Weather: Cloudy • Temp: 70 °F (21 °C)
- Referee: Zach Erdmann
- TV announcers (ESPN+): Logan Maddox (play-by-play), Parker Gore (analyst), and Carlie Pair (sideline)

Game information

First quarter

- (7:57) UNA – Scott Payne 24-yard field goal (Drive: 13 plays, 58 yards, 6:11; UNA 3-0)

Second quarter

- (9:52) UWG – Davin Wydner 1-yard rush (2-point conversion no good) (Drive: 5 plays, 83 yards, 1:45; UWG 6-3)
- (5:34) UNA – Scott Payne 27-yard field goal (Drive: 6 plays, 37 yards, 2:46; Tie 6-6)
- (2:08) UWG – Davin Wydner 12-yard rush (Chance Gagnon kick) (Drive: 8 plays, 70 yards, 3:20; UWG 13-6)
- (0:04) UNA – Takairee Kenebrew 2-yard pass from TJ Smith (Scott Payne kick) (Drive: 12 plays, 75 yards, 2:04; Tie 13-13)

Third quarter

- (0:42) UNA – Dakota Warfield 4-yard pass from TJ Smith (Scott Payne kick) (Drive: 13 plays, 56 yards, 5:33; UNA 20-13)

Fourth quarter

- (7:47) UNA – Scott Payne 30-yard field goal (Drive: 9 plays, 42 yards, 5:58; UNA 23-13)
- (1:52) UWG – Chance Gagnon 32-yard field goal (Drive: 6 plays, 30 yards, 1:29; UNA 23-16)
- (0:37) UNA – Davin Wynder sacked for a safety (Drive: 1 play; UNA 25-16)

Statistics	UNA	UWG
First downs	21	16
Total yards	354	223
Rushing yards	170	80
Passing yards	184	143
Passing: Comp–Att–Int	18-29-0	10-18-0
Time of possession	43:16	16:44

Team	Category	Player	Statistics
North Alabama	Passing	TJ Smith	18/29, 184 yards, 2 TD
North Alabama	Rushing	Dennis Moody	12 carries, 54 yards
North Alabama	Receiving	Dakota Warfield	5 receptions, 51 yards, 1 TD
West Georgia	Passing	Davin Wydner	10/17, 143 yards
West Georgia	Rushing	Rajaez Mosley	9 carries, 66 yards
West Georgia	Receiving	Chase Belcher	2 receptions, 75 yards

=== vs. Austin Peay ===
Game Five – Austin Peay Governors (1–4) at West Georgia Wolves (1–3) – Game summary

Quarter	1	2	3	4	Total
Governors	0	0	0	0	0
Wolves	0	0	0	0	0

at University Stadium • Carrollton, GA

- Date: Saturday October 5, 2024
- Game time: 2:00 p.m.
- Game weather: 0 °F (−18 °C)
- TV announcers (ESPN+): Logan Maddox, Parker Gore, Carlie Pair

Game information

First quarter
Second quarter
Third quarter
Fourth quarter

Statistics	APSU	UWG
First downs		
Total yards		
Rushing yards		
Passing yards		
Passing: Comp–Att–Int		
Time of possession		

Team	Category	Player	Statistics
Austin Peay	Passing		
Austin Peay	Rushing		
Austin Peay	Receiving		
West Georgia	Passing		
West Georgia	Rushing		
West Georgia	Receiving		

=== at No. 13 Central Arkansas ===
Game Six – West Georgia Wolves (1–4) at No. 13 Central Arkansas Bears (4–2) – Game summary

Quarter	1	2	3	4	Total
Wolves	0	0	0	0	0
No. 13 Bears	0	0	0	0	0

at Estes Stadium • Conway, AR

- Date: Saturday October 12, 2024
- Game time: 5:00 p.m.
- Game weather: 0 °F (−18 °C)
- TV announcers (ESPN+): Dylan McLemore, JB Brazeal

Game information

First quarter
Second quarter
Third quarter
Fourth quarter

Statistics	UWG	UCA
First downs		
Total yards		
Rushing yards		
Passing yards		
Passing: Comp–Att–Int		
Time of possession		

Team	Category	Player	Statistics
West Georgia	Passing		
West Georgia	Rushing		
West Georgia	Receiving		
Central Arkansas	Passing		
Central Arkansas	Rushing		
Central Arkansas	Receiving		

=== vs. Shorter (DII) ===
Game Seven – Shorter Hawks (DII) (2–2) vs West Georgia Wolves (1–5) – Game summary

Quarter	1	2	3	4	Total
Hawks (DII)	0	0	0	0	0
Wolves	0	0	0	0	0

at University Stadium • Carrollton, GA

- Date: Saturday October 19, 2024
- Game time: 2:00 p.m.
- TV announcers (ESPN+): Logan Maddox, Parker Gore, Carlie Pair

Game information

First quarter
Second quarter
Third quarter
Fourth quarter

Statistics	SHORT	UWG
First downs		
Total yards		
Rushing yards		
Passing yards		
Passing: Comp–Att–Int		
Time of possession		

Team	Category	Player	Statistics
Shorter	Passing		
Shorter	Rushing		
Shorter	Receiving		
West Georgia	Passing		
West Georgia	Rushing		
West Georgia	Receiving		

=== vs. Southern Utah ===
Game Eight – Southern Utah Thunderbirds (3–4) vs West Georgia Wolves (2–5) – Game summary

Quarter	1	2	3	4	Total
Thunderbirds	0	0	0	0	0
Wolves	0	0	0	0	0

at University Stadium • Carrollton, GA

- Date: Saturday October 26, 2024
- Game time: 2:00 p.m.
- TV announcers (ESPN+): Logan Maddox, Parker Gore, Carlie Pair

Game information

First quarter
Second quarter
Third quarter
Fourth quarter

Statistics	SUU	UWG
First downs		
Total yards		
Rushing yards		
Passing yards		
Passing: Comp–Att–Int		
Time of possession		

Team	Category	Player	Statistics
Southern Utah	Passing		
Southern Utah	Rushing		
Southern Utah	Receiving		
West Georgia	Passing		
West Georgia	Rushing		
West Georgia	Receiving		

=== vs. Lincoln (CA) (IND) ===
Game Nine – Lincoln Oaklanders (IND) (0–8) vs West Georgia Wolves (2–6) – Game summary

Quarter	1	2	3	4	Total
Oaklanders (IND) (Note: Lincoln is unaffiliated with any national sanctioning body and permanently plays as a travel team.)	0	0	0	0	0
Wolves	0	0	0	0	0

at University Stadium • Carrollton, GA

- Date: Saturday November 2, 2024
- Game time: 2:00 p.m.
- TV announcers (ESPN+): Logan Maddox, Parker Gore, Carlie Pair

Game information

First quarter
Second quarter
Third quarter
Fourth quarter

Statistics	LCLN	UWG
First downs		
Total yards		
Rushing yards		
Passing yards		
Passing: Comp–Att–Int		
Time of possession		

Team	Category	Player	Statistics
Lincoln (CA)	Passing		
Lincoln (CA)	Rushing		
Lincoln (CA)	Receiving		
West Georgia	Passing		
West Georgia	Rushing		
West Georgia	Receiving		

=== vs. No. 14 Tarleton State ===
Game Ten – No. 14 Tarleton State Texans (7–2) vs West Georgia Wolves (3–6) – Game summary

Quarter	1	2	3	4	Total
No. 14 Texans	0	0	0	0	0
Wolves	0	0	0	0	0

at University Stadium • Carrollton, GA

- Date: Saturday November 9, 2024
- Game time: 1:00 PM CST
- Game weather: 0 °F (−18 °C)
- TV: ESPN+

Game information

First quarter
Second quarter
Third quarter
Fourth quarter

Statistics	TAR	UWG
First downs		
Total yards		
Rushing yards		
Passing yards		
Passing: Comp–Att–Int		
Time of possession		

Team	Category	Player	Statistics
Tarleton State	Passing		
Tarleton State	Rushing		
Tarleton State	Receiving		
West Georgia	Passing		
West Georgia	Rushing		
West Georgia	Receiving		

=== at Utah Tech ===
Game Eleven – West Georgia Wolves (3–7) at Utah Tech Trailblazers (1–9) – Game summary

Quarter	1	2	3	4	Total
Wolves	0	0	0	0	0
Trailblazers	0	0	0	0	0

at Greater Zion Stadium • St. George, UT

- Date: Saturday November 16, 2024
- Game time: 4:00 p.m.
- Game weather: 0 °F (−18 °C)
- TV announcers (ESPN+): Rod Zundel, Max Christensen III

Game information

First quarter
Second quarter
Third quarter
Fourth quarter

Statistics	UWG	UTU
First downs		
Total yards		
Rushing yards		
Passing yards		
Passing: Comp–Att–Int		
Time of possession		

Team	Category	Player	Statistics
West Georgia	Passing		
West Georgia	Rushing		
West Georgia	Receiving		
Utah Tech	Passing		
Utah Tech	Rushing		
Utah Tech	Receiving		
