= 2024 Southern Utah Thunderbirds football team =

American college football season

2024 Southern Utah Thunderbirds football
- Conference: United Athletic Conference
- Record: 7–5 (6–2 UAC)
- Head coach: DeLane Fitzgerald (3rd season)
- Defensive coordinator: John Kelling (3rd season)
- Home stadium: Eccles Coliseum

2024 United Athletic Conference standings
| | Conf. | | | Overall |
| Team | W | | L | W | | L |
|---|---|---|---|---|---|---|
| No. 14 Abilene Christian $^ | 7 | – | 1 | 9 | – | 5 |
| No. 13 Tarleton State ^ | 6 | – | 2 | 10 | – | 4 |
| No. 21 Eastern Kentucky ^ | 6 | – | 2 | 8 | – | 5 |
| Southern Utah | 6 | – | 2 | 7 | – | 5 |
| Central Arkansas | 3 | – | 5 | 6 | – | 6 |
| Austin Peay | 3 | – | 5 | 4 | – | 8 |
| North Alabama | 3 | – | 5 | 3 | – | 9 |
| West Georgia* | 1 | – | 7 | 4 | – | 7 |
| Utah Tech | 1 | – | 7 | 1 | – | 11 |
$ – Conference champion; ^ – FCS playoff participant; Note: West Georgia is ineligible for the UAC title and FCS postseason play due to transition from NCAA Division II.; Rankings from STATS Poll

The 2024 Southern Utah Thunderbirds football team represented Southern Utah University as a member of the United Athletic Conference (UAC) during the 2024 NCAA Division I FCS football season. The Thunderbirds were coached by third-year head coach DeLane Fitzgerald and played at Eccles Coliseum in Cedar City, Utah.

== Schedule ==
| Date | Time | Opponent | Site | TV | Result | Attendance |
|---|---|---|---|---|---|---|
| August 29 | 7:00 p.m. | at No. 12 (FBS) Utah* | Rice–Eccles Stadium; Salt Lake City, UT | ESPN+ | L 0–49 | 52,210 |
| September 7 | 7:00 p.m. | at UTEP* | Sun Bowl; El Paso, TX | ESPN+ | W 27–24 ^{OT} | 41,609 |
| September 14 | 6:00 p.m. | No. 15 UC Davis* | Eccles Coliseum; Cedar City, UT | ESPN+ | L 21–24 | 5,013 |
| September 21 | 4:00 p.m. | at Idaho State* | ICCU Dome; Pocatello, ID | ESPN+ | L 28–38 | 8,688 |
| September 28 | 12:00 p.m. | at Austin Peay | Fortera Stadium; Clarksville, TN | ESPN+ | W 28–17 | 3,988 |
| October 5 | 6:00 p.m. | No. 14 Tarleton State | Eccles Coliseum; Cedar City, UT | ESPN+ | L 37–38 ^{OT} | 3,562 |
| October 12 | 2:00 p.m. | Eastern Kentucky^{†} | Eccles Coliseum; Cedar City, UT | ESPN+ | W 42–21 | 5,134 |
| October 26 | 12:00 p.m. | at West Georgia | University Stadium; Carrollton, GA | ESPN+ | W 28–17 | 2,243 |
| November 2 | 2:00 p.m. | at No. 17 Abilene Christian | Wildcat Stadium; Abilene, TX | ESPN+ | L 25–28 | 9,701 |
| November 9 | 1:00 p.m. | North Alabama | Eccles Coliseum; Cedar City, UT | ESPN+ | W 38–26 | 3,042 |
| November 16 | 3:00 p.m. | at No. 24 Central Arkansas | Estes Stadium; Conway, AR | ESPN+ | W 38–31 | 4,024 |
| November 23 | 1:00 p.m. | Utah Tech | Eccles Coliseum; Cedar City, UT | ESPN+ | W 37–34 ^{2OT} | 4,115 |
*Non-conference game; ^{†}Homecoming; Rankings from STATS Poll released prior to the game; All times are in Mountain time

== Game summaries ==
=== at No. 12 (FBS) Utah ===
Game One – Southern Utah Thunderbirds (0-0) vs No. 12 (FBS) Utah Utes (0-0) – Game summary

| Quarter | 1 | 2 | 3 | 4 | Total |
|---|---|---|---|---|---|
| Thunderbirds | 0 | 0 | 0 | 0 | 0 |
| No. 12 (FBS) Utes | 7 | 28 | 7 | 7 | 49 |

at Rice-Eccles Stadium • Salt Lake City, UT

- Date: Thursday August 29, 2024
- Game time: 7:00 p.m.
- Game weather: 76 °F (24 °C)
- Game attendance: 52,210
- Referee: Henry Johns
- TV announcers (ESPN+): Richard Cross (play-by-play), Barrett Brooks (analyst), and Shane Sparks (sideline reporter)

Game information

First quarter

- (8:46) UTAH – Dijon Stanley 64-yard pass from Cameron Rising (Cole Becker kick) (Drive: 7 plays, 90 yards, 2:56; Utah 7-0)

Second quarter

- (14:48) UTAH – Brant Kuithe 29-yard pass from Cameron Rising (Cole Becker kick) (Drive: 8 plays, 67 yards, 3:01; Utah 14-0)
- (11:27) UTAH – Brant Kuithe 18-yard pass from Cameron Rising (Cole Becker kick) (Drive: 3 plays, 48 yards, 1:44; Utah 21-0)
- (9:04) UTAH – Dijon Stanley 79-yard pass from Cameron Rising (Cole Becker kick) (Drive: 1 play, 79 yards, 0:12; Utah 28-0)
- (1:08) UTAH – Brant Kuithe 11-yard pass from Cameron Rising (Cole Becker kick) (Drive: 11 plays, 74 yards, 5:34; Utah 35-0)

Third quarter

- (4:23) UTAH – Mike Mitchell 4-yard run (Cole Becker kick) (Drive: 12 plays, 57 yards, 6:09; Utah 42-0)

Fourth quarter

- (11:05) UTAH – Caleb Lohner 20-yard pass from Isaac Wilson (Trey Coleman kick) (Drive: 1 play, 20 yards, 0:07; Utah 49-0)

| Statistics | SUU | UTAH |
|---|---|---|
| First downs | 9 | 26 |
| Total yards | 150 | 513 |
| Rushing yards | 79 | 185 |
| Passing yards | 71 | 328 |
| Passing: Comp–Att–Int | 8–21–1 | 17–26–2 |
| Time of possession | 28:45 | 31:15 |

| Team | Category | Player | Statistics |
|---|---|---|---|
| Southern Utah | Passing | Jackson Berry | 6/11, 54 yards, INT |
| Southern Utah | Rushing | Targhee Lambson | 6 carries, 44 yards |
| Southern Utah | Receiving | Mark Bails | 3 receptions, 42 yards |
| Utah | Passing | Cameron Rising | 10/15, 254 yards, 5 TD |
| Utah | Rushing | Dijon Stanley | 6 carries, 34 yards |
| Utah | Receiving | Dijon Stanley | 3 receptions, 150 yards, 2 TD |

=== at UTEP (FBS) ===
Game Two – Southern Utah Thunderbirds (0–1) vs UTEP Miners (FBS) (0–1) – Game summary

| Quarter | 1 | 2 | 3 | 4 | OT | Total |
|---|---|---|---|---|---|---|
| Thunderbirds | 6 | 0 | 8 | 10 | 3 | 27 |
| Miners (FBS) | 14 | 0 | 3 | 7 | 0 | 24 |

at Sun Bowl • El Paso, TX

- Date: Saturday September 7, 2024
- Game time: 7:00 p.m.
- Game weather: Sunny • Temperature: 82 °F (28 °C)
- Game attendance: 41,609
- Referee: Rory Bernard
- TV announcers (ESPN+): TBD
- Box Score

Game information
First quarter
- UTEP – Jevon Jackson 5-yard pass from Skyler Locklear (Buzz Flabiano kick), 10:33. UTEP 7–0. Drive: 9 plays, 75 yards, 4:27.
- SUU – Zach Mitchell 40-yard pass from Bronson Barron, 6:09. UTEP 7–6. Drive: 8 plays, 75 yards, 4:24.
- UTEP – Skyler Locklear 5-yard run (Buzz Flabiano kick), 1:35. UTEP 14–6. Drive: 11 plays, 75 yards, 4:34.

Second quarter

- UTEP – Buzz Flabiano 43-yard field goal, 2:57. UTEP 17–6. Drive: 7 plays, 50 yards, 2:59.

Third quarter

- SUU – Targhee Lambson 20-yard run (Mark Bails Jr. run), 6:31. UTEP 17–14. Drive: 6 plays, 50 yards, 2:53.

Fourth quarter

- SUU – Targhee Lambson 46-yard run (Danny King kick), 13:15. Southern Utah 21–17. Drive: 4 plays, 60 yards, 1:37.
- SUU – Danny King 38-yard field goal, 2:39. Southern Utah 24–17. Drive: 11 plays, 59 yards, 5:37.
- UTEP – Skyler Locklear 4-yard pass from Jaden Smith (Buzz Flabiano kick), 0:00. Tied 24–24. Drive: 9 plays, 77 yards, 2:34.

Overtime

- SUU – Danny King 33-yard field goal. Southern Utah 27–24. Drive: 7 plays, 9 yards.

| Statistics | SUU | UTEP |
|---|---|---|
| First downs | 21 | 17 |
| Total yards | 383 | 423 |
| Rushing yards | 268 | 124 |
| Passing yards | 115 | 299 |
| Passing: Comp–Att–Int | 11–18–0 | 23–30–0 |
| Time of possession | 31:24 | 28:36 |

| Team | Category | Player | Statistics |
|---|---|---|---|
| Southern Utah | Passing | Jackson Berry | 10/17, 75 yds |
| Southern Utah | Rushing | Targhee Lambson | 20 rushes, 183 yds, 2 TD |
| Southern Utah | Receiving | Zach Mitchell | 3 receptions, 62 yds, TD |
| UTEP | Passing | Skyler Locklear | 22/29, 295 yds, TD |
| UTEP | Rushing | Jevon Jackson | 20 rushes, 80 yds |
| UTEP | Receiving | Kam Thomas | 5 receptions, 99 yds |

=== vs. No. 15 UC Davis ===
Game Three – No. 15 UC Davis Aggies (1–1) vs Southern Utah Thunderbirds (1–1) – Game summary

| Quarter | 1 | 2 | 3 | 4 | Total |
|---|---|---|---|---|---|
| No. 15 Aggies | 3 | 3 | 18 | 0 | 24 |
| Thunderbirds | 7 | 7 | 0 | 7 | 21 |

at Eccles Coliseum • Cedar City, UT

- Date: Saturday September 14, 2024
- Game time: 6:00 p.m.
- Game weather: Sunny • Temperature: 80 °F (27 °C) • Wind: N 12 miles per hour (19 km/h)
- Game attendance: 5,013
- Referee: Zach Erdmann
- TV announcers (ESPN+): Scott Marsh (play-by-play) and Scott Gordon (analyst)
- Box Score

Game information
First quarter
- SUU – LaCarea Pleasant-Johnson 59-yard interception (Danny King kick), 13:11. Southern Utah 7–0.
- UCD – Hunter Ridley 39-yard field goal, 4:37. Southern Utah 7–3. Drive: 11 plays, 54 yards, 8:34.

Second quarter

- SUU – Targhee Lambson 3-yard run (Danny King kick), 1:21. Southern Utah 14–3. Drive: 12 plays, 88 yards, 6:05.
- UCD – Hunter Ridley 37-yard field goal, 0:00. Southern Utah 14–6. Drive: 6 plays, 56 yards, 1:21.

Third quarter

- UCD – Winston Williams 10-yard pass from Miles Hastings (Lan Larison pass), 10:43. Tied 14–14. Drive: 7 plays, 68 yards, 3:03.
- UCD – Lan Larison 60-yard pass from Miles Hastings (Hunter Ridley kick), 8:39. UC Davis 21–14. Drive: 1 play, 60 yards, 0:13.
- UCD – Hunter Ridley 23-yard field goal, 1:45. UC Davis 24–14. Drive: 4 plays, 2 yards, 1:27.

Fourth quarter

- SUU – Targhee Lambson 2-yard run (Danny King kick), 5:13. UC Davis 24–21. Drive: 9 plays, 74 yards, 3:44.

| Statistics | UCD | SUU |
|---|---|---|
| First downs | 18 | 22 |
| Total yards | 355 | 340 |
| Rushing yards | 89 | 210 |
| Passing yards | 266 | 130 |
| Passing: Comp–Att–Int | 24–31–1 | 14–28–1 |
| Time of possession | 30:10 | 29:50 |

| Team | Category | Player | Statistics |
|---|---|---|---|
| UC Davis | Passing | Miles Hastings | 24/30, 266 yds, 2 TD, INT |
| UC Davis | Rushing | Lan Larison | 15 rushes, 88 yds |
| UC Davis | Receiving | Lan Larison | 7 receptions, 92 yds, TD |
| Southern Utah | Passing | Bronson Barron | 7/15, 81 yds, INT |
| Southern Utah | Rushing | Targhee Lambson | 24 rushes, 149 yds, 2 TD |
| Southern Utah | Receiving | Mark Bails Jr. | 7 receptions, 45 yds |

=== at Idaho State ===
Game Four – Southern Utah Thunderbirds (1–2) at Idaho State Bengals (1–2) – Game summary

| Quarter | 1 | 2 | 3 | 4 | Total |
|---|---|---|---|---|---|
| Thunderbirds | 0 | 0 | 0 | 0 | 0 |
| Bengals | 0 | 0 | 0 | 0 | 0 |

at ICCU Dome • Pocatello, ID

- Date: Saturday September 21, 2024
- Game time: 4:00 PM MST
- Game weather: None (Indoor stadium)
- TV announcers (ESPN+): TBD

Game information

First quarter
Second quarter
Third quarter
Fourth quarter

| Statistics | SUU | IDST |
|---|---|---|
| First downs | | |
| Total yards | | |
| Rushing yards | | |
| Passing yards | | |
| Passing: Comp–Att–Int | | |
| Time of possession | | |

| Team | Category | Player | Statistics |
|---|---|---|---|
| Southern Utah | Passing | | |
| Southern Utah | Rushing | | |
| Southern Utah | Receiving | | |
| Idaho State | Passing | | |
| Idaho State | Rushing | | |
| Idaho State | Receiving | | |

=== at Austin Peay ===
Game Five – Southern Utah Thunderbirds (1–3) vs Austin Peay Governors (1–3) – Game summary

| Quarter | 1 | 2 | 3 | 4 | Total |
|---|---|---|---|---|---|
| Thunderbirds | 0 | 0 | 0 | 0 | 0 |
| Governors | 0 | 0 | 0 | 0 | 0 |

at Fortera Stadium • Clarksville, TN

- Date: Saturday September 28, 2024
- Game time: 12:00 PM MST
- Game weather: 0 °F (−18 °C)
- TV announcers (ESPN+): TBD

Game information

First quarter
Second quarter
Third quarter
Fourth quarter

| Statistics | SUU | APSU |
|---|---|---|
| First downs | | |
| Total yards | | |
| Rushing yards | | |
| Passing yards | | |
| Passing: Comp–Att–Int | | |
| Time of possession | | |

| Team | Category | Player | Statistics |
|---|---|---|---|
| Southern Utah | Passing | | |
| Southern Utah | Rushing | | |
| Southern Utah | Receiving | | |
| Austin Peay | Passing | | |
| Austin Peay | Rushing | | |
| Austin Peay | Receiving | | |

=== at No. 14 Tarleton State ===
Game Six – Southern Utah Thunderbirds (2–3) vs No. 14 Tarleton State Texans (4–1) – Game summary

| Quarter | 1 | 2 | 3 | 4 | Total |
|---|---|---|---|---|---|
| Thunderbirds | 0 | 0 | 0 | 0 | 0 |
| No. 14 Texans | 0 | 0 | 0 | 0 | 0 |

at Memorial Stadium • Stephenville, TX

- Date: Saturday October 5, 2024
- Game time: 7:00 p.m.
- TV announcers (ESPN+): TBD

Game information

First quarter
Second quarter
Third quarter
Fourth quarter

| Statistics | SUU | TAR |
|---|---|---|
| First downs | | |
| Total yards | | |
| Rushing yards | | |
| Passing yards | | |
| Passing: Comp–Att–Int | | |
| Time of possession | | |

| Team | Category | Player | Statistics |
|---|---|---|---|
| Southern Utah | Passing | | |
| Southern Utah | Rushing | | |
| Southern Utah | Receiving | | |
| Tarleton State | Passing | | |
| Tarleton State | Rushing | | |
| Tarleton State | Receiving | | |

=== vs. Eastern Kentucky ===
Game Seven – Eastern Kentucky Colonels (3–2) at Southern Utah Thunderbirds (2–4) – Game summary

| Quarter | 1 | 2 | 3 | 4 | Total |
|---|---|---|---|---|---|
| Colonels | 0 | 6 | 8 | 7 | 21 |
| Thunderbirds | 7 | 7 | 14 | 14 | 42 |

at Eccles Coliseum • Cedar City, UT

- Date: Saturday October 12, 2024
- Game time: 2:00 p.m.
- Game weather: Sunny • Temperature: 75 °F (24 °C) • Wind: NE 13 miles per hour (21 km/h)
- Game attendance: 5,134
- Referee: John Kellermeier
- TV announcers (ESPN+): TBD

Game information

First quarter

- SUU – Targhee Lambson 3-yard run (Jayden Rogers kick), 4:31. Southern Utah 7–0. Drive: 12 plays, 69 yards, 6:06.

Second quarter

- EKU – Patrick Nations 34-yard field goal, 14:01. Southern Utah 7–3. Drive: 16 plays, 58 yards, 5:30.
- SUU – Gabe Nunez 11-yard pass from Jackson Berry (Jayden Rogers kick), 6:03. Southern Utah 14–3. Drive: 12 plays, 75 yards, 7:58.
- EKU – Patrick Nations 47-yard field goal, 0:02. Southern Utah 14–6. Drive: 6 plays, 45 yards, 0:38.

Third quarter

- EKU – Joshua Carter 2-yard run (Jeremiah Bailey pass), 11:23. Tied 14–14. Drive: 7 plays, 75 yards, 3:37.
- SUU – Devin Downing 12-yard pass from Jackson Berry (Jayden Rogers kick), 7:21. Southern Utah 21–14. Drive: 9 plays, 75 yards, 4:02.
- SUU – Targhee Lambson 8-yard run (Jayden Rogers kick), 3:13. Southern Utah 28–14. Drive: 7 plays, 31 yards, 3:32.

Fourth quarter

- SUU – Shane Carr 38-yard pass from Jackson Berry (Jayden Rogers kick), 8:49. Southern Utah 35–14. Drive: 9 plays, 88 yards, 4:59.
- EKU – Dequan Stanley 9-yard pass from Matt Morrissey (Patrick Nations kick), 5:55. Southern Utah 35–21. Drive: 8 plays, 60 yards, 2:50.
- SUU – Targhee Lambson 1-yard run (Jayden Rogers kick), 1:58. Southern Utah 42–21. Drive: 9 plays, 75 yards, 3:57.

| Statistics | EKU | SUU |
|---|---|---|
| First downs | 23 | 27 |
| Total yards | 276 | 482 |
| Rushing yards | 69 | 278 |
| Passing yards | 207 | 204 |
| Passing: Comp–Att–Int | 24–36–1 | 13–23–0 |
| Time of possession | 23:18 | 36:42 |

| Team | Category | Player | Statistics |
|---|---|---|---|
| Eastern Kentucky | Passing | Matt Morrissey | 24/36, 207 yards, TD, INT |
| Eastern Kentucky | Rushing | Joshua Carter | 11 carries, 43 yards, TD |
| Eastern Kentucky | Receiving | Dequan Stanley | 6 receptions, 47 yards, TD |
| Southern Utah | Passing | Jackson Berry | 13/23, 204 yards, 3 TD |
| Southern Utah | Rushing | Targhee Lambson | 34 carries, 170 yards, 3 TD |
| Southern Utah | Receiving | Devin Downing | 3 receptions, 69 yards, TD |

=== at West Georgia ===
Game Eight – Southern Utah Thunderbirds (3–4) vs West Georgia Wolves (2–5) – Game summary

| Quarter | 1 | 2 | 3 | 4 | Total |
|---|---|---|---|---|---|
| Thunderbirds | 0 | 0 | 0 | 0 | 0 |
| Wolves | 0 | 0 | 0 | 0 | 0 |

at University Stadium • Carrollton, GA

- Date: Saturday October 26, 2024
- Game time: 12:00 p.m.
- TV announcers (ESPN+): TBD

Game information

First quarter
Second quarter
Third quarter
Fourth quarter

| Statistics | SUU | UWG |
|---|---|---|
| First downs | | |
| Total yards | | |
| Rushing yards | | |
| Passing yards | | |
| Passing: Comp–Att–Int | | |
| Time of possession | | |

| Team | Category | Player | Statistics |
|---|---|---|---|
| Southern Utah | Passing | | |
| Southern Utah | Rushing | | |
| Southern Utah | Receiving | | |
| West Georgia | Passing | | |
| West Georgia | Rushing | | |
| West Georgia | Receiving | | |

=== at No. 17 Abilene Christian ===
Game Nine – Southern Utah Thunderbirds (4–4) vs No. 17 Abilene Christian Wildcats (5–3) – Game summary

| Quarter | 1 | 2 | 3 | 4 | Total |
|---|---|---|---|---|---|
| Thunderbirds | 0 | 3 | 7 | 15 | 25 |
| No. 17 Wildcats | 14 | 7 | 0 | 7 | 28 |

at Wildcat Stadium • Abilene, TX

- Date: Saturday November 2, 2024
- Game time: 2:00 p.m.
- Game weather: Cloudy, 78 °F (26 °C)
- Game attendance: 9,701
- Referee: Matthew Jones
- TV announcers (ESPN+): Grant Boone (play-by-play) and Bob Shipley (analyst)

Game information

First quarter

- (10:03) ACU – Javon Gipson 13-yard pass from Maverick McIvor, Ritse Vaes kick (Drive: 8 plays, 61 yards, 3:33; Abilene Christian 7–0)
- (2:05) ACU – Isaiah Johnson 6-yard run, Ritse Vaes kick (Drive: 12 plays, 81 yards, 4:44; Abilene Christian 14–0)

Second quarter

- (10:22) ACU – Isaiah Johnson 1-yard run, Ritse Vaes kick (Drive: 9 plays, 71 yards, 4:38; Abilene Christian 21–0)
- (0:27) SUU – Jayden Rogers 42-yard field goal (Drive: 11 plays, 56 yards, 2:57; Abilene Christian 21–3)

Third quarter

- (1:22) SUU – Targhee Lambson 3-yard run, Jayden Rogers kick (Drive: 4 plays, 78 yards, 1:55; Abilene Christian 21–10)

Fourth quarter

- (9:54) ACU – Sam Hicks 12-yard pass from Maverick McIvor, Ritse Vaes kick (Drive: 12 plays, 88 yards, 6:28; Abilene Christian 28–10)
- (5:56) SUU – Targhee Lambson 13-yard run, Jayden Rogers kick (Drive: 11 plays, 75 yards, 3:58; Abilene Christian 28–17)
- (4:03) SUU – Targhee Lambson 1-yard run, Jayden Rogers kick (Drive: 1 play, 1 yard, 0:04; Abilene Christian 28–25)

| Statistics | SUU | ACU |
|---|---|---|
| First downs | 17 | 26 |
| Total yards | 296 | 445 |
| Rushing yards | 220 | 139 |
| Passing yards | 76 | 306 |
| Passing: Comp–Att–Int | 12–19–0 | 22–31–1 |
| Time of possession | 25:02 | 34:58 |

| Team | Category | Player | Statistics |
|---|---|---|---|
| Southern Utah | Passing | Jackson Berry | 12/19, 76 yards |
| Southern Utah | Rushing | Targhee Lambson | 27 carries, 198 yards, 3 TD |
| Southern Utah | Receiving | Devin Downing | 2 receptions, 21 yards |
| Abilene Christian | Passing | Maverick McIvor | 22/31, 306 yards, 2 TD, INT |
| Abilene Christian | Rushing | Isaiah Johnson | 19 carries, 72 yards, 2 TD |
| Abilene Christian | Receiving | Blayne Taylor | 5 receptions, 81 yards |

=== vs. North Alabama ===
Game Ten – North Alabama Lions (3–7) at Southern Utah Thunderbirds (4–5) – Game summary

| Quarter | 1 | 2 | 3 | 4 | Total |
|---|---|---|---|---|---|
| Lions | 0 | 7 | 19 | 0 | 26 |
| Thunderbirds | 7 | 14 | 10 | 7 | 38 |

at Eccles Coliseum • Cedar City, UT

- Date: Saturday November 9, 2024
- Game time: 1:00 p.m.
- Game weather: Sunny • Temperature: 49 °F (9 °C) • Wind: SE 3 miles per hour (4.8 km/h)
- Game attendance: 3,042
- Referee: Michael Lennie
- TV announcers (ESPN+): Spencer McLaughlin (play-by-play), Dallin Richards (analyst) and Kendall McGuire (sideline)

Game information

First quarter

- (4:01) SUU – Targhee Lambson 18-yard run, Jayden Rogers kick (Drive: 13 plays, 84 yards, 7:27; Southern Utah 7–0)

Second quarter

- (11:08) SUU – Targhee Lambson 1-yard run, Jayden Rogers kick (Drive: 12 plays, 72 yards, 6:49; Southern Utah 14–0)
- (1:56) SUU – Targhee Lambson 2-yard run, Jayden Rogers kick (Drive: 9 plays, 79 yards, 4:30; Southern Utah 21–0)
- (1:17) UNA – Dakota Warfield 22-yard pass from TJ Smith, Scott Payne kick (Drive: 2 plays, 78 yards, 0:32; Southern Utah 21–7)

Third quarter

- (7:42) SUU – Jayden Rogers 50-yard field goal (Drive: 9 plays, 42 yards, 4:20; Southern Utah 24–7)
- (6:58) UNA – Justin Lake 70-yard pass from TJ Smith (Drive: 2 plays, 75 yards, 0:44; Southern Utah 24–13)
- (5:33) SUU – Shane Carr 33-yard pass from Jackson Berry, Jayden Rogers kick (Drive: 4 plays, 60 yards, 1:25; Southern Utah 31–13)
- (5:24) UNA – Takairee Kenebrew 75-yard pass from TJ Smith (Drive: 1 play, 75 yards, 0:09; Southern Utah 31–19)
- (0:40) UNA – Jayvian Allen 3-yard run, Scott Payne kick (Drive: 5 plays, 82 yards, 1:32; Southern Utah 31–26)

Fourth quarter

- (10:51) SUU – Kameron Rocha 48-yard interception, Jayden Rogers kick (Southern Utah 38–26)

| Statistics | UNA | SUU |
|---|---|---|
| First downs | 18 | 23 |
| Total yards | 487 | 407 |
| Rushing yards | 35 | 177 |
| Passing yards | 452 | 230 |
| Passing: Comp–Att–Int | 21–34–2 | 21–31–0 |
| Time of possession | 20:32 | 39:28 |

| Team | Category | Player | Statistics |
|---|---|---|---|
| North Alabama | Passing | TJ Smith | 21/34, 452 yards, 3 TD, 2 INT |
| North Alabama | Rushing | TJ Smith | 7 carries, 31 yards |
| North Alabama | Receiving | Takairee Kenebrew | 5 receptions, 187 yards, TD |
| Southern Utah | Passing | Jackson Berry | 21/31, 230 yards, TD |
| Southern Utah | Rushing | Targhee Lambson | 31 carries, 165 yards, 3 TD |
| Southern Utah | Receiving | Gabe Nunez | 7 receptions, 94 yards |

=== at No. 24 Central Arkansas ===
Game Eleven – Southern Utah Thunderbirds (5–5) at No. 24 Central Arkansas Bears (6–4) – Game summary

| Quarter | 1 | 2 | 3 | 4 | Total |
|---|---|---|---|---|---|
| Thunderbirds | 0 | 0 | 0 | 0 | 0 |
| No. 24 Bears | 0 | 0 | 0 | 0 | 0 |

at Estes Stadium • Conway, AR

- Date: Saturday November 16, 2024
- Game time: 3:00 p.m.
- Game weather: 0 °F (−18 °C)
- TV announcers (ESPN+): TBD

Game information

First quarter
Second quarter
Third quarter
Fourth quarter

| Statistics | SUU | UCA |
|---|---|---|
| First downs | | |
| Total yards | | |
| Rushing yards | | |
| Passing yards | | |
| Passing: Comp–Att–Int | | |
| Time of possession | | |

| Team | Category | Player | Statistics |
|---|---|---|---|
| Southern Utah | Passing | | |
| Southern Utah | Rushing | | |
| Southern Utah | Receiving | | |
| Central Arkansas | Passing | | |
| Central Arkansas | Rushing | | |
| Central Arkansas | Receiving | | |

=== vs. Utah Tech ===
Game Twelve – Utah Tech Trailblazers (1–10) vs Southern Utah Thunderbirds (6–5) – Game summary

| Quarter | 1 | 2 | 3 | 4 | Total |
|---|---|---|---|---|---|
| Trailblazers | 0 | 0 | 0 | 0 | 0 |
| Thunderbirds | 0 | 0 | 0 | 0 | 0 |

at Eccles Coliseum • Cedar City, UT

- Date: Saturday November 23, 2024
- Game time: 1:00 p.m.
- TV announcers (ESPN+): TBD

Game information

First quarter
Second quarter
Third quarter
Fourth quarter

| Statistics | UTU | SUU |
|---|---|---|
| First downs | | |
| Total yards | | |
| Rushing yards | | |
| Passing yards | | |
| Passing: Comp–Att–Int | | |
| Time of possession | | |

| Team | Category | Player | Statistics |
|---|---|---|---|
| Utah Tech | Passing | | |
| Utah Tech | Rushing | | |
| Utah Tech | Receiving | | |
| Southern Utah | Passing | | |
| Southern Utah | Rushing | | |
| Southern Utah | Receiving | | |
