= 2024 Utah Tech Trailblazers football team =

American college football season

2024 Utah Tech Trailblazers football
- Conference: United Athletic Conference
- Record: 1–11 (1–7 UAC)
- Head coach: Lance Anderson (1st season)
- Offensive coordinator: Greg Stevens (1st season)
- Defensive coordinator: Patrick Moynahan (1st season)
- Home stadium: Greater Zion Stadium

2024 United Athletic Conference standings
	Conf.			Overall
Team	W		L	W		L
No. 14 Abilene Christian $^	7	–	1	9	–	5
No. 13 Tarleton State ^	6	–	2	10	–	4
No. 21 Eastern Kentucky ^	6	–	2	8	–	5
Southern Utah	6	–	2	7	–	5
Central Arkansas	3	–	5	6	–	6
Austin Peay	3	–	5	4	–	8
North Alabama	3	–	5	3	–	9
West Georgia*	1	–	7	4	–	7
Utah Tech	1	–	7	1	–	11
$ – Conference champion; ^ – FCS playoff participant; Note: West Georgia is ineligible for the UAC title and FCS postseason play due to transition from NCAA Division II.; Rankings from STATS Poll

The 2024 Utah Tech Trailblazers football team represented Utah Tech University as a member of the United Athletic Conference (UAC) during the 2024 NCAA Division I FCS football season. The Trailblazers were coached by first-year head coach Lance Anderson and played at Greater Zion Stadium in St. George, Utah.

== Schedule ==
Date	Time	Opponent	Site	TV	Result	Attendance
August 31	8:00 p.m.	No. 4 Montana State*	Greater Zion Stadium; St. George, UT	ESPN+	L 7–31	5,074
September 7	1:00 p.m.	at UNLV*	Allegiant Stadium; Paradise, NV	MW Network	L 14–72	24,512
September 14	7:00 p.m.	Northern Arizona*	Greater Zion Stadium; St. George, UT	ESPN+	L 17–45	3,938
September 21	8:00 p.m.	at No. 13 UC Davis*	UC Davis Health Stadium; Davis, CA	ESPN+	L 14–32	14,832
September 28	7:00 p.m.	No. 20 Abilene Christian^{†}	Greater Zion Stadium; St. George, UT	ESPN+	L 30–55	5,451
October 5	3:00 p.m.	at North Alabama	Braly Municipal Stadium; Florence, AL	ESPN+	L 14–60	6,875
October 12	5:00 p.m.	at No. 13 Tarleton State	Memorial Stadium; Stephenville, TX	ESPN+	L 0–42	22,018
October 19	2:00 p.m.	Austin Peay	Greater Zion Stadium; St. George, UT	ESPN+	L 7–13	3,133
October 26	1:00 p.m.	at Eastern Kentucky	Roy Kidd Stadium; Richmond, KY	ESPN+	L 17–28	7,491
November 2	2:00 p.m.	No. 11 Central Arkansas	Greater Zion Stadium; St. George, UT	ESPN+	W 34–21	2,526
November 16	2:00 p.m.	West Georgia	Greater Zion Stadium; St. George, UT	ESPN+	L 31–34	2,791
November 23	1:00 p.m.	at Southern Utah	Eccles Coliseum; Cedar City, UT	ESPN+	L 34–37 ^{2OT}	4,115
*Non-conference game; ^{†}Homecoming; Rankings from STATS Poll released prior to the game; All times are in Mountain time

== Game summaries ==
=== vs. No. 4 Montana State ===
Game One – No. 4 Montana State Bobcats (1–0) at Utah Tech Trailblazers (0–0) – Game summary

Quarter	1	2	3	4	Total
No. 4 Bobcats	7	7	10	7	31
Trailblazers	0	0	0	7	7

at Greater Zion Stadium • St. George, UT

- Date: Saturday August 31, 2024
- Game time: 8:00 p.m.
- Game weather: Sunny, 93 °F (34 °C)
- Game attendance: 5,074
- Referee: John Kellermeier
- TV announcers (ESPN+): Rod Zundel (play-by-play), Max Christensen III (color commentator)

Game information

First quarter

- (2:35) MTST - Adam Jones 17-yard run (Myles Sansted kick) (Montana State 7-0)

Second quarter

- (13:13) MTST - Tommy Mellott 47-yard run (Myles Sansted kick) (Montana State 14-0)

Third quarter

- (12:24) MTST - Rohan Jones 45-yard pass from Tommy Mellott (Myles Sansted kick) (Montana State 21-0)
- (7:45) MTST - Brendan Hall 28-yard field goal (Montana State 24-0)

Fourth quarter

- (14:02) MTST - Tommy Mellott 1-yard run (Myles Sansted kick) (Montana State 31-0)
- (13:03) UTTU - Deacon Hill 24-yard run (Ilya Uvaydov kick) (Montana State 31-7)

Statistics	MTST	UTU
First downs	25	6
Total yards	481	176
Rushing yards	329	73
Passing yards	152	103
Passing: Comp–Att–Int	14-24-0	12-26-0
Time of possession	44:36	15:24

Team	Category	Player	Statistics
Montana State	Passing	Tommy Mellott	14/21, 152 yards, 1 TD
Montana State	Rushing	Scottre Humphrey	20 carries, 107 yards
Montana State	Receiving	Rohan Jones	4 receptions, 66 yards, TD
Utah Tech	Passing	Deacon Hill	11/23, 104 yards
Utah Tech	Rushing	Deacon Hill	2 carries, 25 yards, TD
Utah Tech	Receiving	Fisher Jackson	1 reception, 37 yards

=== at UNLV (FBS) ===
Game Two – Utah Tech Trailblazers (0–1) vs UNLV Rebels (FBS) (1–0) – Game summary

Quarter	1	2	3	4	Total
Trailblazers	7	0	7	0	14
Rebels (FBS)	28	16	7	21	72

at Allegiant Stadium • Paradise, NV

- Date: Saturday September 7, 2024
- Game time: 1:00 p.m. MST
- Game weather: None (Indoor stadium)
- Game attendance: 24,512
- Referee: Kenneth Ray
- TV announcers (KVVU-TV): Matt Neverett (play-by-play), Caleb Herring (analyst), and Steve Cofield (sideline)

Game information

First quarter

- (13:54) UNLV – Jai'Den Thomas 27-yard run, Caden Chittenden kick (Drive: 3 plays, 64 yards, 1:02; UNLV 7–0)
- (12:57) UTU – Alec Burton 64-yard pass from Deacon Hill, Ilya Uvaydov kick (Drive: 3 plays, 75 yards, 0:57; Tied 7–7)
- (10:59) UNLV – Ricky White III 5-yard pass from Matthew Sluka, Caden Chittenden kick (Drive: 7 plays, 51 yards, 1:57; UNLV 14–7)
- (7:33) UNLV – Ricky White III 55-yard pass from Matthew Sluka, Caden Chittenden kick (Drive: 4 plays, 76 yards, 1:54; UNLV 21–7)
- (2:42) UNLV – Ricky White III 7-yard pass from Matthew Sluka, Caden Chittenden kick (Drive: 9 plays, 62 yards, 3:16; UNLV 28–7)

Second quarter

- (14:11) UNLV – Caden Chittenden 27-yard field goal (Drive: 4 plays, 5 yards, 1:15; UNLV 31–7)
- (12:23) UNLV – Matthew Sluka 30-yard run, Caden Chittenden kick (Drive: 3 plays, 72 yards, 0:55; UNLV 38–7)
- (9:41) UNLV – Caden Chittenden 28-yard field goal (Drive: 4 plays, 3 yards, 1:13; UNLV 41–7)
- (2:05) UNLV – Caden Chittenden 36-yard field goal (Drive: 9 plays, 59 yards, 5:47; UNLV 44–7)

Third quarter

- (5:17) UNLV – Greg Burrell 4-yard run, Caden Chittenden kick (Drive: 12 plays, 60 yards, 5:28; UNLV 51–7)
- (1:14) UTU – Chris Street 31-yard pass from Deacon Hill, Ilya Uvaydov kick (Drive: 9 plays, 75 yards, 4:03; UNLV 51–14)

Fourth quarter

- (13:08) UNLV – Timothy Conerly 8-yard run, Andre Meono kick (Drive: 8 plays, 64 yards, 2:58; UNLV 58–14)
- (8:50) UNLV – Cameron Friel 1-yard run, Andre Meono kick (Drive: 5 plays, 75 yards, 2:24; UNLV 65–14)
- (2:25) UNLV – Devin Green 38-yard run, Andre Meono kick (Drive: 7 plays, 66 yards, 4:33; UNLV 72–14)

Statistics	UTU	UNLV
First downs	13	34
Total yards	293	695
Rushing yards	67	504
Passing yards	226	191
Passing: Comp–Att–Int	18–34–1	9–18–0
Time of possession	23:43	36:17

Team	Category	Player	Statistics
Utah Tech	Passing	Deacon Hill	14/28, 188 yards, 2 TD, INT
Utah Tech	Rushing	Reggie Graff	5 carries, 30 yards
Utah Tech	Receiving	Alec Burton	1 reception, 64 yards, TD
UNLV	Passing	Matthew Sluka	8/17, 161 yards, 3 TD
UNLV	Rushing	Greg Burrell	11 carries, 101 yards, TD
UNLV	Receiving	Ricky White III	5 receptions, 111 yards, 3 TD

=== vs. Northern Arizona ===
Game Three – Northern Arizona Lumberjacks (1–1) at Utah Tech Trailblazers (0–2) – Game summary

Quarter	1	2	3	4	Total
Lumberjacks	0	0	0	0	0
Trailblazers	0	0	0	0	0

at Greater Zion Stadium • St. George, UT

- Date: Saturday September 14, 2024
- Game time: 7:00 p.m.
- Game weather: 0 °F (−18 °C)
- TV announcers (ESPN+): TBD

Game information

First quarter
Second quarter
Third quarter
Fourth quarter

Statistics	NAU	UTU
First downs		
Total yards		
Rushing yards		
Passing yards		
Passing: Comp–Att–Int		
Time of possession		

Team	Category	Player	Statistics
Northern Arizona	Passing		
Northern Arizona	Rushing		
Northern Arizona	Receiving		
Utah Tech	Passing		
Utah Tech	Rushing		
Utah Tech	Receiving		

=== at No. 13 UC Davis ===
Game Four – Utah Tech Trailblazers (0–3) vs No. 13 UC Davis Aggies (2–1) – Game summary

Quarter	1	2	3	4	Total
Trailblazers	0	0	0	0	0
No. 13 Aggies	0	0	0	0	0

at UC Davis Health Stadium • Davis, CA

- Date: Saturday September 21, 2024
- Game time: 7:00 PM PST
- TV announcers (ESPN+): Scott Marsh (play-by-play) and Scott Gordon (analyst)

Game information

First quarter
Second quarter
Third quarter
Fourth quarter

Statistics	UTU	UCD
First downs		
Total yards		
Rushing yards		
Passing yards		
Passing: Comp–Att–Int		
Time of possession		

Team	Category	Player	Statistics
Utah Tech	Passing		
Utah Tech	Rushing		
Utah Tech	Receiving		
UC Davis	Passing		
UC Davis	Rushing		
UC Davis	Receiving		

=== vs. No. 20 Abilene Christian ===
Game Five – No. 20 Abilene Christian Wildcats (2–2) at Utah Tech Trailblazers (0–4) – Game summary

Quarter	1	2	3	4	Total
No. 20 Wildcats	14	13	14	14	55
Trailblazers	7	9	0	14	30

at Greater Zion Stadium • St. George, UT

- Date: Saturday September 28, 2024
- Game time: 7:00 p.m.
- Game weather: Sunny, 102 °F (39 °C)
- Game attendance: 5,451
- Referee: Matthew Jones
- TV announcers (ESPN+): Rod Zundel (play-by-play), Max Christensen III (analyst) and Ronnie Walker Jr. (sideline)

Game information

First quarter

- UTU – Chris Street 7-yard run (Ilya Uvaydov kick), 9:36. Trailblazers 7–0. Drive: 7 plays, 55 yards, 2:53.
- ACU – Blayne Taylor 76-yard pass from Maverick McIvor (Ritse Vaes kick), 8:16. Tied 7–7. Drive: 4 plays, 75 yards, 1:20.
- ACU – Sam Hicks 53-yard run (Ritse Vaes kick), 2:56. Wildcats 14–7. Drive: 8 plays, 91 yards, 3:19.

Second quarter

- UTU – Ilya Uvaydov 32-yard field goal, 13:24. Wildcats 14–10. Drive: 4 plays, 4 yards, 1:22.
- ACU – Ritse Vaes 52-yard field goal, 11:06. Wildcats 17–10. Drive: 7 plays, 39 yards, 2:18.
- ACU – Ritse Vaes 25-yard field goal, 3:26. Wildcats 20–10. Drive: 5 plays, 18 yards, 1:54.
- ACU – Sam Hicks 35-yard run (Ritse Vaes kick), 0:27. Wildcats 27–10. Drive: 7 plays, 77 yards, 0:45.
- UTU – Eric Olsen 32-yard pass from Reggie Graff (kick failed), 0:09. Wildcats 27–16. Drive: 3 plays, 75 yards, 0:18.

Third quarter

- ACU – Nehemiah Martinez I 73-yard pass from Maverick McIvor (Ritse Vaes kick), 14:11. Wildcats 34–16. Drive: 2 plays, 75 yards, 0:43.
- ACU – Isaiah Johnson 9-yard run (Ritse Vaes kick), 7:21. Wildcats 41–16. Drive: 11 plays, 79 yards, 5:10.

Fourth quarter

- ACU – Sam Hicks 8-yard run (Ritse Vaes kick), 11:11. Wildcats 48–16. Drive: 4 plays, 76 yards, 2:09.
- ACU – Chris Wright 28-yard fumble return (Ritse Vaes kick), 10:57. Wildcats 55–16.
- UTU – Reggie Graff 9-yard run (Ilya Uvaydov kick), 9:02. Wildcats 55–23. Drive: 4 plays, 75 yards, 1:55.
- UTU – Bretton Stone 10-yard run (Ilya Uvaydov kick), 3:46. Wildcats 55–30. Drive: 7 plays, 70 yards, 3:07.

Statistics	ACU	UTU
First downs	22	22
Total yards	609	508
Rushing yards	323	180
Passing yards	286	328
Passing: Comp–Att–Int	18–34–0	21–40–0
Time of possession	28:48	31:12

Team	Category	Player	Statistics
Abilene Christian	Passing	Maverick McIvor	18/33, 286 yards, 2 TD
Abilene Christian	Rushing	Sam Hicks	12 carries, 203 yards, 3 TD
Abilene Christian	Receiving	Blayne Taylor	5 receptions, 128 yards, TD
Utah Tech	Passing	Reggie Graff	13/22, 231 yards, TD
Utah Tech	Rushing	Reggie Graff	12 carries, 79 yards, TD
Utah Tech	Receiving	Eric Olsen	3 receptions, 60 yards, TD

=== at North Alabama ===
Game Six – Utah Tech Trailblazers (0–5) at North Alabama Lions (1–5) – Game summary

Quarter	1	2	3	4	Total
Trailblazers	0	0	0	14	14
Lions	18	21	14	7	60

at Braly Municipal Stadium, Florence, AL

- Date: Saturday October 5, 2024
- Game time: 3:00 p.m.
- Game weather: SW at 4 miles per hour (6.4 km/h) • Weather: Sunny • Temp: 88 °F (31 °C)
- Game attendance: 6,875
- Referee: Michael Franin
- TV announcers (ESPN+): Benjamin Ray (play-by-play) and Bryan Neece (analyst)

Game information

First quarter

- (12:36) UNA – Jayvian Allen 4-yard rush (Scott Payne kick) (Drive: 7 plays, 75 yards, 2:24; UNA 7-0)
- (8:10) UNA – Scott Payne 37-yard kick (Drive: 6 plays, 30 yards, 3:03; UNA 10-0)
- (4:03) UNA – Kaleb Heatherly 8-yard pass from TJ Smith (Marlon Krakue pass) (Drive: 6 plays, 47 yards, 2:39; UNA 18-0)

Second quarter

- (12:46) UNA – Dakota Warfield 23-yard pass from TJ Smith (Scott Payne kick) (Drive: 1 plays, 23 yards, 0:06; UNA 25-0)
- (9:43) UNA – Jyheam Ingram 40-yard fumble recovery (Scott Payne kick) (UNA 32-0)
- (8:14) UNA – Jayvian Allen 19-yard pass from TJ Smith (Scott Payne kick) (Drive: 3 plays, 24 yards, 1:23; UNA 39-0)

Third quarter

- (13:56) UNA – Jalen Fletcher 55-yard pass from TJ Smith (Scott Payne kick) (Drive: 1 play, 55 yards, 0:10; UNA 46-0)
- (6:44) UNA – TJ Smith 2-yard rush (Scott Payne kick) (Drive: 9 plays, 79 yards, 5:24; UNA 53-0)

Fourth quarter

- (14:17) UNA – Ben Harris 1-yard rush (Scott Payne kick) (Drive: 10 plays, 75 yards, 6:04; UNA 60-0)
- (11:52) UTU – Alec Burton 39-yard pass from Bronson Barben (Ilya Uvaydov kick) (Drive: 7 plays, 75 yards, 2:25; UNA 60-7)
- (9:12) UTU – Bryce Parker 75-yard pass from Bronson Barben (Ilya Uvaydov kick) (Drive: 1 play, 75 yards, 0:12; UNA 60-14)

Statistics	UTU	UNA
First downs	13	27
Total yards	240	501
Rushing yards	10	257
Passing yards	230	244
Passing: Comp–Att–Int	15–30–1	14–20–0
Time of possession	22:13	37:47

Team	Category	Player	Statistics
Utah Tech	Passing	Bronson Barben	5/8, 137 yards, 2 TD
Utah Tech	Rushing	Bretton Stone	4 carries, 28 yards
Utah Tech	Receiving	Bryce Parker	3 receptions, 98 yards, TD
North Alabama	Passing	TJ Smith	13/17, 207 yards, 4 TD
North Alabama	Rushing	Jalen Fletcher	9 carries, 73 yards
North Alabama	Receiving	Takairee Kenebrew	5 receptions, 75 yards

=== at No. 13 Tarleton State ===
Game Seven – Utah Tech Trailblazers (0–6) vs No. 13 Tarleton State Texans (5–1) – Game summary

Quarter	1	2	3	4	Total
Trailblazers	0	0	0	0	0
No. 13 Texans	0	0	0	0	0

at Memorial Stadium • Stephenville, TX

- Date: Saturday October 12, 2024
- Game time: 5:00 p.m.
- TV announcers (ESPN+): TBD

Game information

First quarter
Second quarter
Third quarter
Fourth quarter

Statistics	UTU	TAR
First downs		
Total yards		
Rushing yards		
Passing yards		
Passing: Comp–Att–Int		
Time of possession		

Team	Category	Player	Statistics
Utah Tech	Passing		
Utah Tech	Rushing		
Utah Tech	Receiving		
Tarleton State	Passing		
Tarleton State	Rushing		
Tarleton State	Receiving		

=== vs. Austin Peay ===
Game Eight – Austin Peay Governors (2–4) at Utah Tech Trailblazers (0–7) – Game summary

Quarter	1	2	3	4	Total
Governors	0	0	0	0	0
Trailblazers	0	0	0	0	0

at Greater Zion Stadium • St. George, UT

- Date: Saturday October 19, 2024
- Game time: 2:00 p.m.
- Game weather: 0 °F (−18 °C)
- TV announcers (ESPN+): TBD

Game information

First quarter
Second quarter
Third quarter
Fourth quarter

Statistics	APSU	UTU
First downs		
Total yards		
Rushing yards		
Passing yards		
Passing: Comp–Att–Int		
Time of possession		

Team	Category	Player	Statistics
Austin Peay	Passing		
Austin Peay	Rushing		
Austin Peay	Receiving		
Utah Tech	Passing		
Utah Tech	Rushing		
Utah Tech	Receiving		

=== at Eastern Kentucky ===
Game Nine – Utah Tech Trailblazers (0–8) vs Eastern Kentucky Colonels (3–4) – Game summary

Quarter	1	2	3	4	Total
Trailblazers	0	0	0	0	0
Colonels	0	0	0	0	0

at Roy Kidd Stadium • Richmond, KY

- Date: Saturday October 26, 2024
- Game time: 1:00 p.m.
- TV announcers (ESPN+): TBD

Game information

First quarter
Second quarter
Third quarter
Fourth quarter

Statistics	UTU	EKU
First downs		
Total yards		
Rushing yards		
Passing yards		
Passing: Comp–Att–Int		
Time of possession		

Team	Category	Player	Statistics
Utah Tech	Passing		
Utah Tech	Rushing		
Utah Tech	Receiving		
Eastern Kentucky	Passing		
Eastern Kentucky	Rushing		
Eastern Kentucky	Receiving		

=== vs. No. 11 Central Arkansas ===
Game Ten – No. 11 Central Arkansas Bears (6–2) at Utah Tech Trailblazers (0–9) – Game summary

Quarter	1	2	3	4	Total
No. 11 Bears	0	0	0	0	0
Trailblazers	0	0	0	0	0

at Greater Zion Stadium • St. George, UT

- Date: Saturday November 2, 2024
- Game time: 2:00 p.m.
- Game weather: 0 °F (−18 °C)
- TV announcers (ESPN+): TBD

Game information

First quarter
Second quarter
Third quarter
Fourth quarter

Statistics	UCA	UTU
First downs		
Total yards		
Rushing yards		
Passing yards		
Passing: Comp–Att–Int		
Time of possession		

Team	Category	Player	Statistics
Central Arkansas	Passing		
Central Arkansas	Rushing		
Central Arkansas	Receiving		
Utah Tech	Passing		
Utah Tech	Rushing		
Utah Tech	Receiving		

=== vs. West Georgia ===
Game Eleven – West Georgia Wolves (3–7) at Utah Tech Trailblazers (1–9) – Game summary

Quarter	1	2	3	4	Total
Wolves	0	0	0	0	0
Trailblazers	0	0	0	0	0

at Greater Zion Stadium • St. George, UT

- Date: Saturday November 16, 2024
- Game time: 2:00 p.m.
- Game weather: 0 °F (−18 °C)
- TV announcers (ESPN+): TBD

Game information

First quarter
Second quarter
Third quarter
Fourth quarter

Statistics	UWG	UTU
First downs		
Total yards		
Rushing yards		
Passing yards		
Passing: Comp–Att–Int		
Time of possession		

Team	Category	Player	Statistics
West Georgia	Passing		
West Georgia	Rushing		
West Georgia	Receiving		
Utah Tech	Passing		
Utah Tech	Rushing		
Utah Tech	Receiving		

=== at Southern Utah ===
Game Twelve – Utah Tech Trailblazers (1–10) vs Southern Utah Thunderbirds (6–5) – Game summary

Quarter	1	2	3	4	Total
Trailblazers	0	0	0	0	0
Thunderbirds	0	0	0	0	0

at Eccles Coliseum • Cedar City, UT

- Date: Saturday November 23, 2024
- Game time: 1:00 p.m.
- TV announcers (ESPN+): TBD

Game information

First quarter
Second quarter
Third quarter
Fourth quarter

Statistics	UTU	SUU
First downs		
Total yards		
Rushing yards		
Passing yards		
Passing: Comp–Att–Int		
Time of possession		

Team	Category	Player	Statistics
Utah Tech	Passing		
Utah Tech	Rushing		
Utah Tech	Receiving		
Southern Utah	Passing		
Southern Utah	Rushing		
Southern Utah	Receiving		
