= Joel Taylor (American football) =

American football coach (born c. 1982)

Current position
- Title: Head coach
- Team: Mercer
- Conference: SoCon
- Record: 10–2

Biographical details
- Born: c. 1982 (age 43–44); Brooklyn, New York, U.S.
- Education: South Carolina State University (2004, 2008)

Playing career
- 2001–2004: South Carolina State
- Position: Defensive back

Coaching career (HC unless noted)
- 2005–2006: South Carolina State (GA)
- 2007–2008: South Carolina State (def. assistant)
- 2009: Lenoir–Rhyne (OLB)
- 2010–2013: South Carolina State (DB)
- 2014–2018: The Citadel (S)
- 2019: Lenoir–Rhyne (DC/LB)
- 2020–2023: Mercer (DC/LB)
- 2024–2025: West Georgia
- 2026–present: Mercer

Head coaching record
- Overall: 22–12

Accomplishments and honors

Championships
- 1 SoCon (2026)

Joel Taylor (born c. 1982) is an American college football coach. He is the head football coach for the Mercer University, a position he has held since 2025. He also coached for South Carolina State, Lenoir–Rhyne, The Citadel, and Mercer. He played college football for South Carolina State as a defensive back.

== Head coaching record ==
Year	Team	Overall	Conference	Standing	Bowl/playoffs
West Georgia Wolves (United Athletic Conference) (2024–2025)
2024	West Georgia	4–7	1–7	T–8th	
2025	West Georgia	8–3	5–3	4th	
West Georgia:		12–10	6–10		
Mercer Bears (Southern Conference) (2026–present)
2026	Mercer	10–2	7–1	1st	NCAA Division I
Mercer:		10–2	7–1		
Total:		22–12			
