= Anthony Field at Wildcat Stadium =

Football stadium in Abilene, Texas

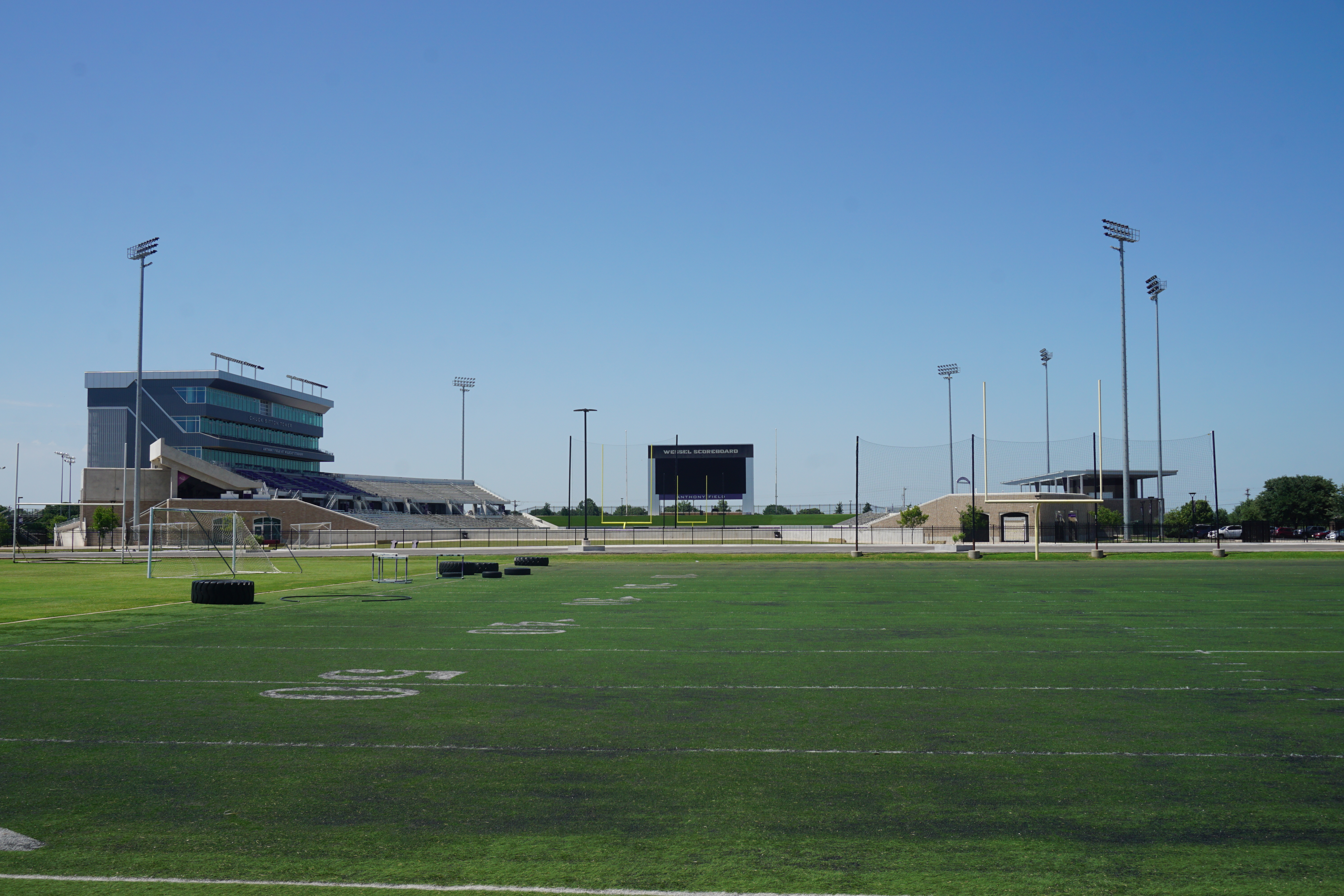
- Interactive map of Anthony Field at Wildcat Stadium
- Location: 1600 Campus Court; Abilene, Texas 79699
- Coordinates: 32.473091°N 99.708736°W
- Owner: Abilene Christian University
- Operator: Abilene Christian University
- Capacity: 12,000
- Surface: FieldTurf
- Scoreboard: Wessel Scoreboard
- Record attendance: 12,000

Construction
- Groundbreaking: February 19, 2016
- Opened: September 16, 2017
- Cost: $50 million
- Architect: HKS, Inc.
- General contractor: Hoar Construction

Tenant
- Abilene Christian University Wildcats (NCAA)

Anthony Field at Wildcat Stadium is a stadium in Abilene, Texas. It is used as the home field of the Abilene Christian Wildcats football team. The stadium currently seats 12,000 people. The stadium's field is named after Abilene Christian University alumni, Mark and April Anthony, whose generous lead gift helped to fund the stadium.

== History ==
Abilene Christian University, Hoar Construction and HKS Sports & Entertainment Group officially broke ground on February 19, 2016, to begin construction of the new stadium. Hoar Construction and HKS Sports & Entertainment Group were recognized by the Associated Builders and Contractors, Inc., 28th Annual Excellence in Construction Awards, for their work on the project. The stadium hosted its first home game on September 16, 2017, against the Houston Baptist Huskies.

=== Features ===
Wildcat Stadium features berm, club level and suite seating, a press box, event space for seating up to 500 people for non-gameday events, as well as a dedicated student section and an HD Video board in the north endzone.

== See also ==
- List of NCAA Division I FCS football stadiums
