= Maverick McIvor =

American football player (born 2000)

No. 7
- Position: Quarterback

Personal information
- Born: August 22, 2000 (age 26)
- Listed height: 6 ft 2 in (1.88 m)
- Listed weight: 209 lb (95 kg)

Career information
- High school: Central (San Angelo, Texas)
- College: Texas Tech (2019–2021); Abilene Christian (2022–2024); Western Kentucky (2025)
- NFL draft: 2026: undrafted

Awards and highlights
- New Orleans Bowl MVP (2025); First-team All-UAC (2024)
- Stats at ESPN

Maverick McIvor (born August 22, 2000) is an American football quarterback. He played college football for the Texas Tech Red Raiders, the Abilene Christian Wildcats, and the Western Kentucky Hilltoppers.

== Early life ==
McIvor attended Central High School in San Angelo, Texas. As a junior, he threw for 3,372 yards and 43 touchdowns. During his senior season, McIvor suffered a season ending knee injury, causing him to miss significant playing time. Following his high school career, he committed to play college football at Texas Tech University.

== College career ==
McIvor spent three seasons at Texas Tech, not receiving any playing time. Following the 2021 season, he transferred to Abilene Christian University where he was named the starting quarterback. In his first season at Abilene Christian, McIvor threw for 2,212 yards with 16 touchdowns. He had a breakout year during the 2024 season. In the season opener against his former team, Texas Tech, McIvor threw for 506 yards and three touchdowns, being named the FCS National Offensive Player of the Week. After recording 3,828 yards and 30 touchdowns, he entered the transfer portal for a second time.

On January 6, 2025, McIvor announced his decision to transfer to Western Kentucky University to play for the Western Kentucky Hilltoppers. Entering the 2025 season, he was named the Hilltoppers starting quarterback. In the season opener against Sam Houston, McIvor threw for 401 yards and totaled four touchdowns in a 41–24 victory.

=== Statistics ===
Season	Team	Games			Passing								Rushing			
Season	Team	GP	GS	Record	Cmp	Att	Pct	Yds	Y/A	TD	Int	Rtg	Att	Yds	Avg	TD
2019	Texas Tech	0	0	—	Redshirted (redshirt)											
2020	Texas Tech	0	0	—	DNP											
2021	Texas Tech	0	0	—	DNP											
2022	Abilene Christian	10	9	5–4	179	296	60.0	2,212	7.5	16	9	135.0	46	49	1.1	1
2023	Abilene Christian	11	11	5–6	164	294	55.7	1,972	6.7	17	5	127.8	45	29	0.6	2
2024	Abilene Christian	13	13	8–5	312	499	62.5	3,828	7.7	30	7	144.0	34	−39	−1.1	0
2025	Western Kentucky	8	7	5–2	183	273	67.0	2,062	7.6	12	6	140.6	39	76	1.9	2
Career		42	40	23–17	838	1,362	61.5	10,074	7.4	75	27	137.9	164	115	0.7	5

== Professional career ==
Pre-draft measurables
Height	Weight	Arm length	Hand span	Wingspan	40-yard dash	10-yard split	20-yard split	20-yard shuttle	Three-cone drill	Broad jump
6 ft 2 in (1.88 m)	209 lb (95 kg)	31 1/4 in (0.79 m)	9 in (0.23 m)	6 ft 3 1/2 in (1.92 m)	4.96 s	1.75 s	2.87 s	4.35 s	7.22 s	9 ft 2 in (2.79 m)
All values from Pro Day

In April 2026, he attended rookie minicamp with the Dallas Cowboys and Chicago Bears.

== Personal life ==
McIvor's father, Rick, is a former quarterback at both the collegiate level, where he played for the Texas Longhorns, as well as the professional level, where he played in the National Football League for the St. Louis Cardinals.
