= List of United States tornadoes from January to March 2021 =

United States tornadoes from January to March 2021
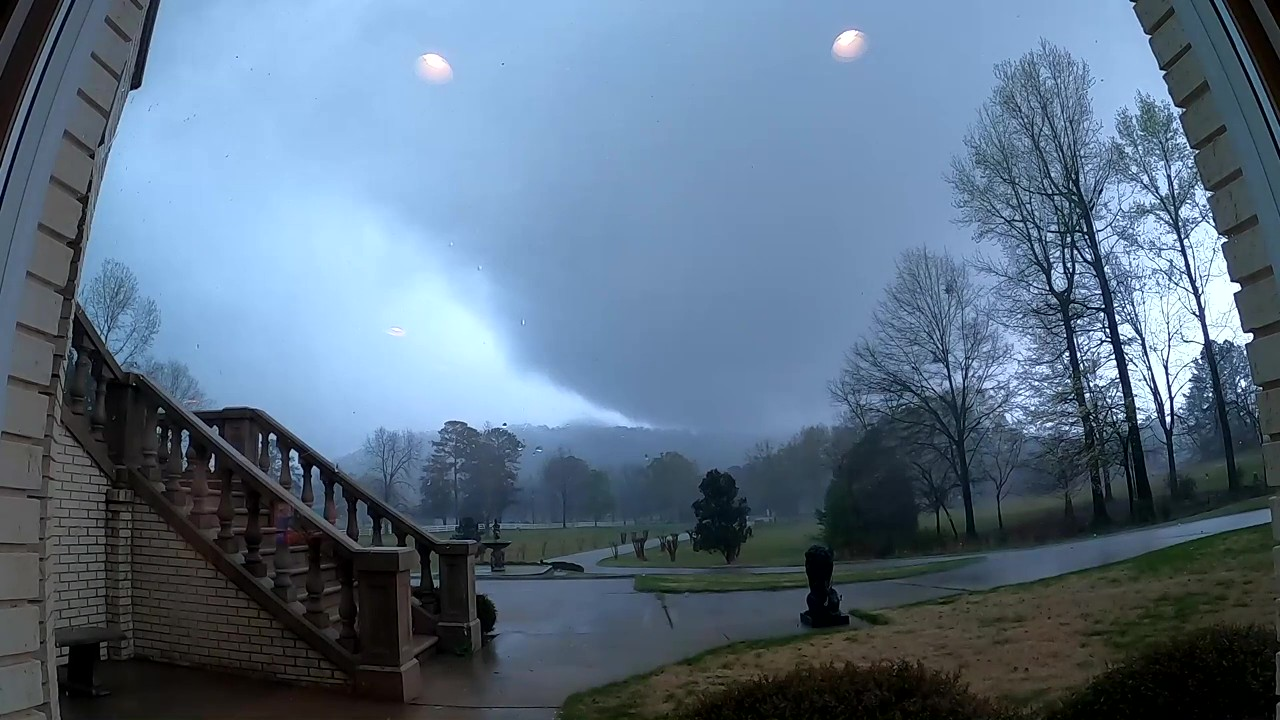
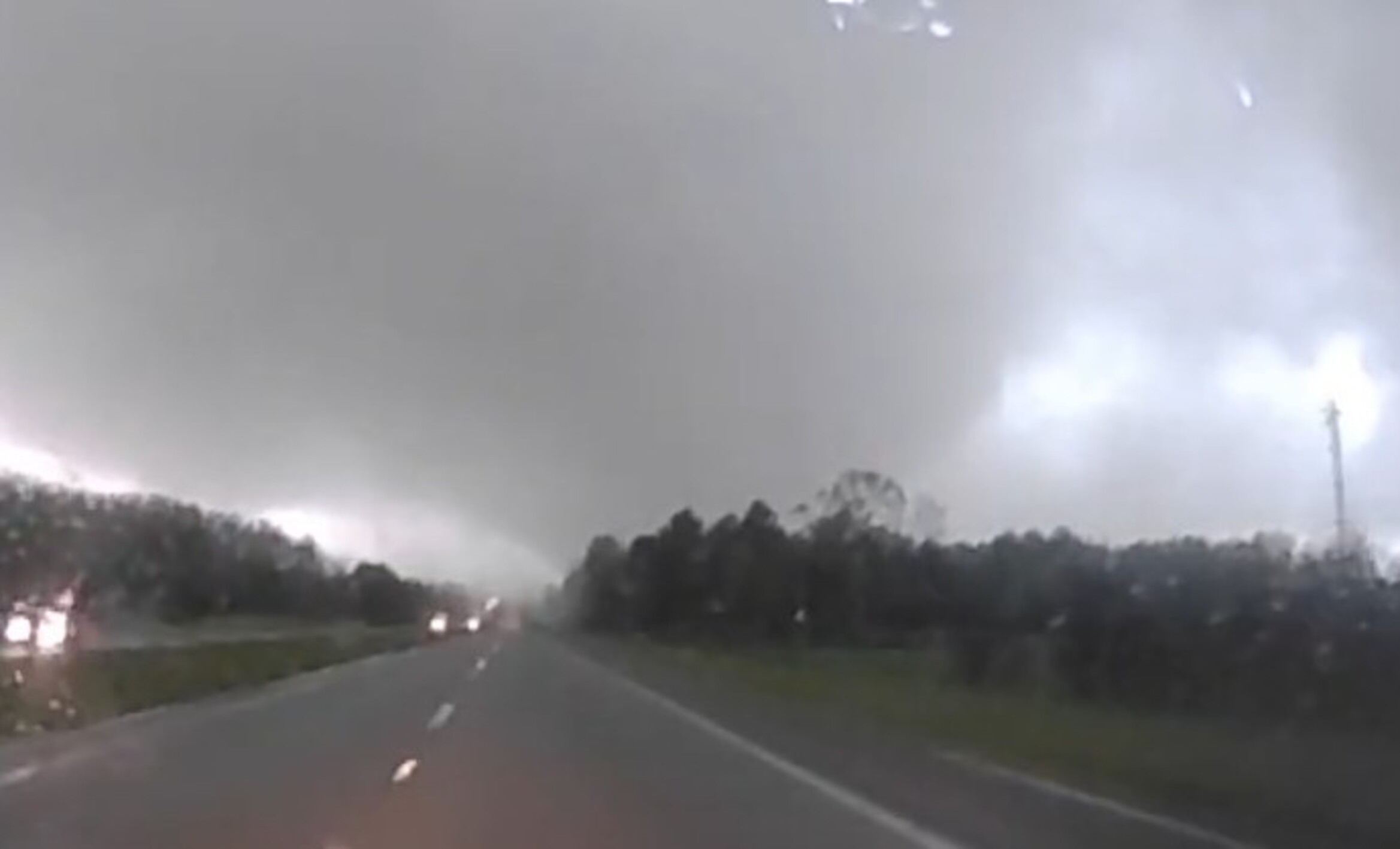
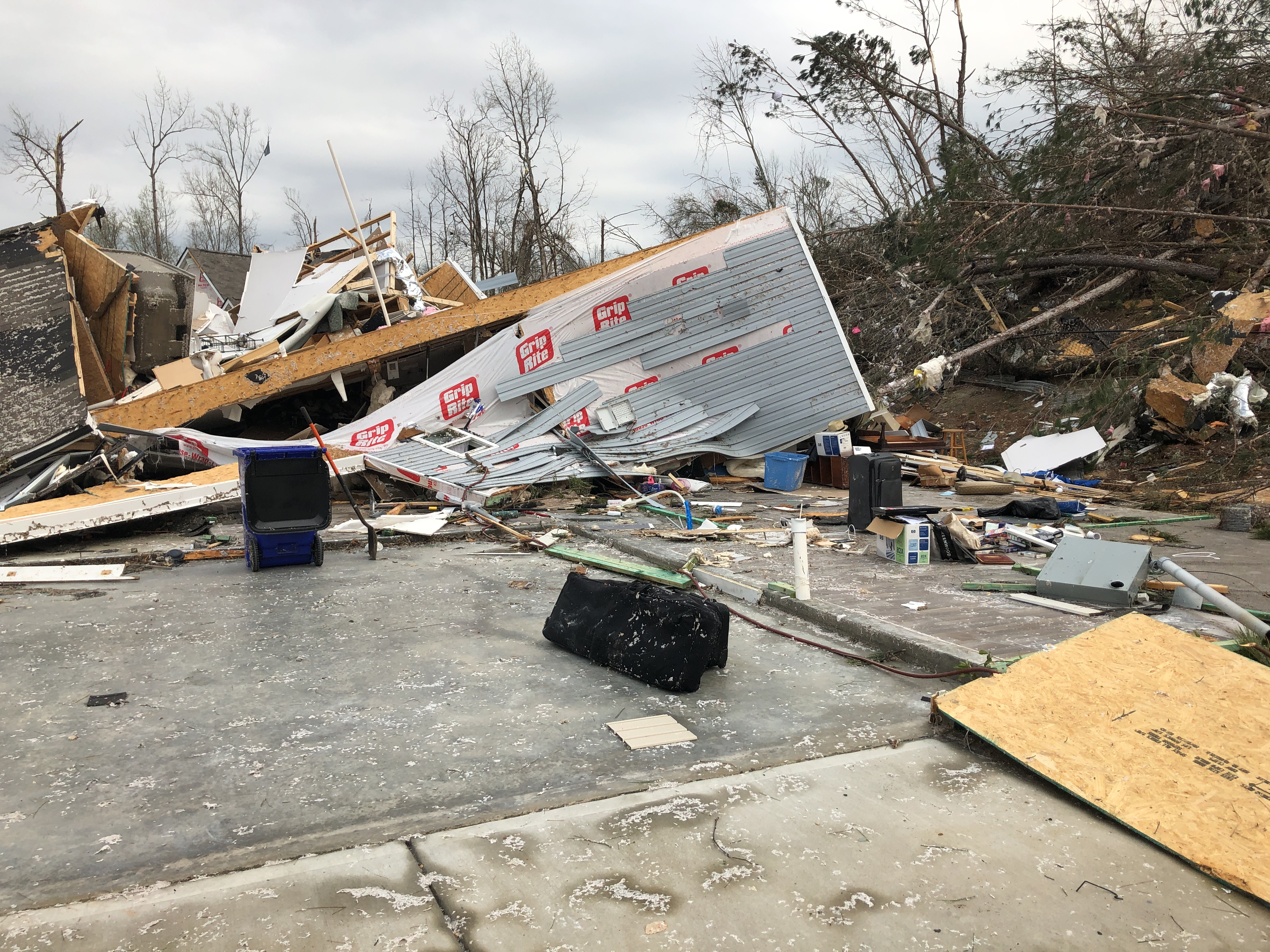
- Clockwise from top: A large EF3 tornado passing through Pelham, Alabama on March 25; A home after an EF4 tornado struck Newnan, Georgia on March 25; A deadly EF3 tornado near Ohatchee, Alabama on March 25.
- Timespan: January 1 – March 31
- Maximum rated tornado: EF4 tornado: Newnan, Georgia on March 25
- Tornadoes: 166
- Fatalities: 11
- Injuries: 89

This page documents all tornadoes confirmed by various weather forecast offices of the National Weather Service in the United States during January, February, and March 2021. January has an average of 35 tornadoes in the United States, February averages 29, and March averages 80.

The year started well below average with the lowest amount of tornado reports through two months in the past 16 years. January saw only 16 tornadoes, while February saw only 11. March, however, saw several outbreaks and was above average with 139 tornadoes.

== United States yearly total ==
Confirmed tornadoes by Enhanced Fujita rating
EFU	EF0	EF1	EF2	EF3	EF4	EF5	Total
210	545	433	103	21	3	0	1,315

== January ==
Confirmed tornadoes by Enhanced Fujita rating
EFU	EF0	EF1	EF2	EF3	EF4	EF5	Total
4	6	5	0	1	0	0	16

=== January 1 event ===
List of confirmed tornadoes – Friday, January 1, 2021 (Note: All dates are based on the local time zone where the tornado touched down; however, all times are in Coordinated Universal Time for consistency.)
EF#	Location	County / Parish	State	Start Coord.	Time (UTC)	Path length	Max width
EF0	N of Butler	Taylor	GA	32.632°N 84.256°W	19:01–19:05	2.9 mi (4.7 km)	150 yd (140 m)
EF0	One home had minor roof damage. Trees were snapped or uprooted.						
EF0	W of Ceres	Crawford	GA	32.774°N 84.093°W	19:18–19:20	0.84 mi (1.35 km)	100 yd (91 m)
EF0	Part of a roof was taken off a home. Multiple trees were snapped or uprooted.						
EF0	E of Russellville	Monroe	GA	32.897°N 83.959°W	19:35–19:37	1.2 mi (1.9 km)	150 yd (140 m)
EF0	A garage was destroyed and up to 10 other structures sustained minor damage. Multiple trees were snapped or uprooted.						
EF1	N of Bolingbroke to WNW of Dames Ferry	Monroe	GA	33.0057°N 83.7998°W	19:51–19:55	3.34 mi (5.38 km)	200 yd (180 m)
EF1	One person was injured when a mobile home was flipped onto its side near the intersection of SR 18 and SR 87. Trees were snapped or uprooted. A tornado debris signature was present with this tornado.						

=== January 4 event ===
List of confirmed tornadoes – Monday, January 4, 2021
EF#	Location	County / Parish	State	Start Coord.	Time (UTC)	Path length	Max width
EF0	SW of Henleyville	Tehama	CA	39.96°N 122.33°W	21:34–21.39	0.78 mi (1.26 km)	3 yd (2.7 m)
EF0	A barn and other outbuildings were damaged. A power pole and trees were knocked down.						
EF0	NE of Vina	Tehama	CA	39.9562°N 122.0167°W	22:40–22:50	2.66 mi (4.28 km)	3 yd (2.7 m)
EF0	Photos and video confirm that a tornado touched down in an open field. No damage was reported.						

=== January 6 event ===
List of confirmed tornadoes – Wednesday, January 6, 2021
EF#	Location	County / Parish	State	Start Coord.	Time (UTC)	Path length	Max width
EF1	Texas City	Galveston	TX	29.3974°N 94.9259°W	00:14–00:17	2.01 mi (3.23 km)	50 yd (46 m)
EF1	A convenience store and a nearby apartment complex were heavily damaged. Dirt and insulation was splattered onto all sides of several structures. Another business lost most of its roof and an iron fence was pushed over. Numerous trees had snapped trunks and large limbs.						
EF1	NE of Parks	St. Martin	LA	30.2401°N 91.8108°W	04:52–04:54	1.16 mi (1.87 km)	40 yd (37 m)
EF1	A mobile home was flipped and destroyed, and a storage building was also destroyed. Some homes had roof and awning damage. Some debris was found up in power lines. Several trees were downed.						

=== January 25 event ===
List of confirmed tornadoes – Monday, January 25, 2021
EF#	Location	County / Parish	State	Start Coord.	Time (UTC)	Path length	Max width
EF0	NNE of Piperton	Fayette	TN	35.1176°N 89.6047°W	22:29–22:31	1.26 mi (2.03 km)	50 yd (46 m)
EF0	A brief tornado touched down and moved across a few roads, before lifting a short time later. Numerous trees were downed, but no structural damage was reported.						
EF3	SW of Fultondale to Center Point	Jefferson	AL	33.5965°N 86.8256°W	04:40–04:55	10.4 mi (16.7 km)	900 yd (820 m)
EF3	1 death – See article on this tornado – At least 30 people were injured.						

=== January 27 event ===
List of confirmed tornadoes – Wednesday, January 27, 2021
EF#	Location	County / Parish	State	Start Coord.	Time (UTC)	Path length	Max width
EF1	Fort Braden	Leon	FL	30.4182°N 84.5522°W	16:30–16:31	0.85 mi (1.37 km)	50 yd (46 m)
EF1	Several outbuildings were destroyed and trees were snapped or uprooted.						
EF1	WSW of Tallahassee to WNW of Cody	Leon	FL	30.4074°N 84.4323°W	16:37–17:02	21.37 mi (34.39 km)	200 yd (180 m)
EF1	The tornado first touched down several miles west of Tallahassee International Airport. At the airport, a plane was spun 90 degrees and another small plane was flipped and destroyed. Several airport hangars were also damaged, with some metal roofing being uplifted. One hangar had its front doors shredded, with the supporting structure for one of the doors wrenched free. Further east, a hardwood tree was uprooted and fell onto two cars in a parking lot. Tree damage was noted across the rest of the path. Some trees that were hit were likely weakened by Hurricane Michael in 2018. The tornado finally lifted just before crossing into Jefferson County.						

=== January 30 event ===
List of confirmed tornadoes – Saturday, January 30, 2021
EF#	Location	County / Parish	State	Start Coord.	Time (UTC)	Path length	Max width
EFU	S of Wann	Nowata	OK	36.867°N 95.803°W	19:43–19:45	1.2 mi (1.9 km)	100 yd (91 m)
EFU	A brief tornado occurred over an open field which could not be surveyed, and therefore received no rating.						
EFU	SSE of Wann	Nowata	OK	36.8768°N 95.774°W	19:46–19:47	0.4 mi (0.64 km)	75 yd (69 m)
EFU	A brief tornado occurred over an open field which could not be surveyed, and therefore received no rating.						
EFU	SE of Wann	Nowata	OK	36.8848°N 95.7617°W	19:48–19:50	1.5 mi (2.4 km)	150 yd (140 m)
EFU	A brief tornado occurred over an open field which could not be surveyed, and therefore received no rating.						
EFU	SSW of South Coffeyville	Nowata	OK	36.894°N 95.6926°W	19:56–20:00	2 mi (3.2 km)	100 yd (91 m)
EFU	A brief tornado occurred over an open field which could not be surveyed and therefore received no rating.						

== February ==
Confirmed tornadoes by Enhanced Fujita rating
EFU	EF0	EF1	EF2	EF3	EF4	EF5	Total
0	7	2	1	1	0	0	11

=== February 6 event ===
List of confirmed tornadoes – Saturday, February 6, 2021
EF#	Location	County / Parish	State	Start Coord.	Time (UTC)	Path length	Max width
EF0	SSW of River Bridge	Indian River	FL	27.7359°N 80.532°W	21:12–21:13	0.14 mi (0.23 km)	65 yd (59 m)
EF0	A brief, weak landspout caused minor damage to trees and fences.						

=== February 14 event ===
List of confirmed tornadoes – Sunday, February 14, 2021
EF#	Location	County / Parish	State	Start Coord.	Time (UTC)	Path length	Max width
EF0	Seminole	Pinellas	FL	27.8165°N 82.8038°W	06:07–06:14	1.29 mi (2.08 km)	30 yd (27 m)
EF0	A waterspout formed over Boca Ciega Bay, eventually coming onshore. An apartment complex sustained minor roof damage.						
EF0	SSW of Bakersville	St. Johns	FL	29.8599°N 81.4972°W	19:30–19:31	0.01 mi (0.016 km)	10 yd (9.1 m)
EF0	Some tree limbs were downed near Molasses Junction.						

=== February 15 event ===
List of confirmed tornadoes – Monday, February 15, 2021
EF#	Location	County / Parish	State	Start Coord.	Time (UTC)	Path length	Max width	Summary
EF0	NW of Panama City Beach	Bay	FL	30.2211°N 85.8898°W	20:02–20:04	1.31 mi (2.11 km)	50 yd (46 m)	A high-end EF0 tornado caused minor damage to structures, poles, benches, and fencing occurred near the beach and at Frank Brown Park in Gulf Resort Beach.
EF0	W of Compass Lake	Washington	FL	30.5994°N 85.4557°W	20:39–20:41	0.71 mi (1.14 km)	100 yd (91 m)	A brief high-end EF0 tornado pulled out an outbuilding anchored by wooden poles in shallow concrete, lofting it 20 yards (18 m). Several pine trees were snapped along a driveway. Further north, a double wide manufactured home had minor roof damage. Several other trees were uprooted along the path.
EF0	WNW of Lake City	Columbia	FL	30.207°N 82.738°W	21:17–21:21	0.25 mi (0.40 km)	60 yd (55 m)	There was sporadic damage to trees, fences roofs and other damage to residential buildings. A fence panel was blown about 750 feet (230 m).
EF0	ENE of Desser	Seminole	GA	30.89°N 84.82°W	21:29–21:30	0.5 mi (0.80 km)	50 yd (46 m)	Trees were blown down in a rural area. No structural damage was found, but a brief tornado debris signature appeared on radar.
EF2	S of Damascus to E of Iveys Mill	Early, Baker	GA	31.281°N 84.7211°W	21:38–21:48	11.58 mi (18.64 km)	600 yd (550 m)	This strong tornado first touched down just west of SR 45, where it snapped several trees and damaged the roofs of some homes. Further northeast, the tornado reached its peak intensity as it completely destroyed two small and unanchored homes just south of Damascus, one made of concrete blocks, and the other made of wood with a concrete block foundation. Only scattered debris and the foundations remained of these structures, and a nearby detached garage was also completely destroyed. A truck was tossed from the garage, and cars were heavily damaged. Five injuries occurred at these homes. A third home sustained damage to its exterior and was shifted off its foundation. Trees were also snapped or uprooted, with two cases of metal poles being lodged into trees. A propane tank was dislodged and moved, and power lines went down. Farther northeast, the tornado weakened as it snapped and uprooted more trees. Some minor roofing damage occurred before the tornado lifted.
EF3	N of Sunset Beach to SW of Delco	Brunswick	NC	33.9118°N 78.5096°W	04:34–05:02	21.9 mi (35.2 km)	275 yd (251 m)	3 deaths – See section on this tornado – 10 people were injured.

=== February 28 event ===
List of confirmed tornadoes – Sunday, February 28, 2021
EF#	Location	County / Parish	State	Start Coord.	Time (UTC)	Path length	Max width
EF1	N of Vivian	Caddo	LA	32.8911°N 94.0091°W	00:15–00:18	1.46 mi (2.35 km)	165 yd (151 m)
EF1	A single-family home lost a portion of its roof and an outbuilding sustained damage to its roof panels. A metal storage building had roofing removed, a trampoline was flipped over onto its side, and the skirting of a mobile home was pushed inward. Numerous trees were snapped or uprooted.						
EF1	SW of Cumberland City to N of Alpha	Clinton, Wayne	KY	36.7925°N 85.0874°W	02:18–02:23	3.66 mi (5.89 km)	75 yd (69 m)
EF1	Several large barns were destroyed or had the majority of their walls blown out. A side-by-side vehicle weighing 2,500 pounds (1,100 kg) was moved 30 yards (27 m) and spun 180 degrees. Further northeast on the path, another large barn was destroyed, with its debris being blown 1/4 mile (0.40 km) downwind. A mobile home near Highway 829 was lifted off its foundation. The tornado then crossed Highway 1009 where another large barn had two walls blown out. Its debris was also blown 1/2 mile (0.80 km) downwind. The tornado continued into far western Wayne County, where four barns sustained significant damage to the roofing and side walls, several 2x8 boards were impaled in the ground, a house had shingles removed and siding twisted, and another house sustained pillar damage on the porch. Numerous trees were downed along the path.						

== March ==
Confirmed tornadoes by Enhanced Fujita rating
EFU	EF0	EF1	EF2	EF3	EF4	EF5	Total
19	48	50	17	4	1	0	139

=== March 1 event ===
List of confirmed tornadoes – Monday, March 1, 2021
EF#	Location	County / Parish	State	Start Coord.	Time (UTC)	Path length	Max width
EF1	WSW of Riverdale	Clayton	GA	33.567°N 84.4528°W	11:04–11:05	0.74 mi (1.19 km)	100 yd (91 m)
EF1	A brief tornado embedded in a line of thunderstorms snapped or uprooted several trees. Some trees fell onto homes. Power lines were also downed.						

=== March 12 event ===
List of confirmed tornadoes – Friday, March 12, 2021
EF#	Location	County / Parish	State	Start Coord.	Time (UTC)	Path length	Max width
EFU	N of Shallowater	Lubbock	TX	33.7628°N 102.0183°W	23:05–23:10	1.34 mi (2.16 km)	100 yd (91 m)
EFU	A brief tornado was observed by a trained spotter. No damage occurred.						
EFU	SW of Paducah	Cottle	TX	33.8791°N 100.3975°W	02:16–02:18	0.23 mi (0.37 km)	50 yd (46 m)
EFU	A brief tornado was observed by a trained spotter. No damage occurred.						

=== March 13 event ===
List of confirmed tornadoes – Saturday, March 13, 2021
EF#	Location	County / Parish	State	Start Coord.	Time (UTC)	Path length	Max width	Summary
EFU	WSW of Nazareth	Castro	TX	34.5267°N 102.1505°W	20:55–20:57	0.92 mi (1.48 km)	20 yd (18 m)	A brief tornado was observed by a trained spotter. No damage occurred.
EF2	SW of Happy to ESE of Canyon	Swisher, Randall	TX	34.7054°N 101.9869°W	21:15–22:00	21.25 mi (34.20 km)	1,000 yd (910 m)	Many electrical transmission lines were damaged, a cell phone tower was blown over, and power poles were snapped along the path of this large wedge tornado. Homes sustained significant roof damage, including one that lost a large section of its roof and had considerable damage to its exterior. Damage also occurred to outbuildings, trees, and fencing. The tornado spent much of its life cycle over mostly open land.
EF1	NW of Happy	Randall	TX	34.8012°N 101.9115°W	21:31–21:36	2.5 mi (4.0 km)	500 yd (460 m)	This brief tornado was caught video by storm chasers and residents in the area. It was on the ground simultaneously with the EF2 tornado just to its south. A barn and power lines were damaged before the tornado was absorbed into the larger EF2 tornado.
EF1	N of Happy	Randall	TX	34.8163°N 101.8576°W	21:37–21:42	3.54 mi (5.70 km)	100 yd (91 m)	This was a satellite tornado on the southern side of the main EF2 tornado. Radar and reports and video from storm chasers suggest this was also an anticyclonic tornado. A brief tornado debris signature was visible on doppler radar in association with this tornado as it snapped power poles along Interstate 27. No other damage occurred as this tornado tracked northeast and dissipated.
EF1	E of Canyon	Randall, Armstrong	TX	34.9765°N 101.7275°W	21:48–22:14	8.16 mi (13.13 km)	800 yd (730 m)	This tornado was on the ground simultaneously with the Happy/Canyon EF2 tornado for several minutes as that tornado dissipated. Campgrounds were damaged at Palo Duro Canyon State Park. One cabin at the park lost its entire roof and travel trailers were flipped, including one which was destroyed. None of these trailers were anchored. Other damage at the state park including minor damage to weaker structures, and trees were damaged as well. The tornado became wider as it crossed Palo Duro Canyon. After crossing the canyon, the tornado traveled through a very rural area and lifted as another tornado formed in the vicinity.
EF0	N of Hart	Castro	TX	34.4236°N 102.1134°W	21:54–21:56	1.42 mi (2.29 km)	30 yd (27 m)	A brief tornado flipped an irrigation pivot and caused minor roof damage to a metal building. A Texas Tech West Texas mesonet station located north of Hart measured an 87 mph (140 km/h) wind gust as the tornado passed nearby.
EFU	SE of Nazareth	Castro	TX	34.5248°N 102.0696°W	21:55–21:57	0.3 mi (0.48 km)	30 yd (27 m)	A brief tornado over open land was recorded on video and caused no damage.
EF0	E of Happy	Swisher, Randall	TX	34.7335°N 101.7323°W	22:05–22:11	3.23 mi (5.20 km)	50 yd (46 m)	This tornado was caught on camera by storm chasers. Two power poles were broken in Swisher County.
EF0	NNE of Palo Duro Canyon to ESE of Washburn	Randall, Armstrong	TX	35.0114°N 101.6449°W	22:06–22:34	12.96 mi (20.86 km)	1,000 yd (910 m)	This tornado was on the ground simultaneously with the Palo Duro Canyon EF1 tornado for several minutes as that tornado dissipated. Power poles and several outbuildings were damaged. A semi-truck was pushed over before the tornado lifted after crossing U.S. Highway 287. The tornado occurred over mostly open land and was likely stronger than its rating indicates, but it impacted few structures.
EFU	ESE of Hale Center	Hale	TX	34.0825°N 101.6966°W	22:21	0.04 mi (0.064 km)	20 yd (18 m)	A brief tornado was observed by storm spotters and caused no damage.
EFU	NNE of Aiken	Floyd	TX	34.2333°N 101.4877°W	22:46	0.05 mi (0.080 km)	20 yd (18 m)	A very brief tornado was photographed by a trained spotter. No damage occurred.
EFU	SW of Groom	Armstrong	TX	35.1251°N 101.2360°W	23:02–23:11	3.11 mi (5.01 km)	800 yd (730 m)	The damage path of this tornado was inaccessible by road, and it was confirmed by radar and storm chasers.
EFU	SW of Silverton	Briscoe	TX	34.4504°N 101.32°W	23:08	0.06 mi (0.097 km)	20 yd (18 m)	A brief tornado in an open field was observed and photographed by storm spotters and caused no damage.
EF2	SSW of Clarendon to NE of Howardwick	Donley	TX	34.8861°N 100.9292°W	23:48–00:12	13.22 mi (21.28 km)	1,200 yd (1,100 m)	A tornado moved into the southwest edge of Clarendon, causing minor damage to homes and to Clarendon College, with sheet metal torn off the building. The tornado widened as it moved towards and then across Greenbelt Reservoir and into Howardwick. Mobile homes, recreational vehicles, and boating facilities were heavily damaged. One mobile home was completely destroyed, with debris from the structure scattered. Power poles were snapped, and many trees were snapped along the path.
EF0	Clarendon	Donley	TX	34.9348°N 100.9031°W	23:51–23:52	0.95 mi (1.53 km)	40 yd (37 m)	Brief, rain-wrapped tornado damaged several homes and sheds in town. Around ten homes sustained shingle damage to roofs, and several trees were downed. This tornado occurred simultaneously with and just east of the Clarendon–Howardwick EF2 tornado.
EFU	E of Lazare	Hardeman	TX	34.28°N 99.965°W	01:41	0.2 mi (0.32 km)	50 yd (46 m)	A brief tornado was observed by trained spotters. No damage occurred.
EFU	N of Goodlett	Hardeman	TX	34.3834°N 99.88°W	02:00	0.2 mi (0.32 km)	30 yd (27 m)	A brief tornado was reported by a trained spotter. No damage occurred.
EF0	WNW of Eldorado	Jackson	OK	34.49°N 99.7704°W	02:15	0.2 mi (0.32 km)	30 yd (27 m)	A brief tornado was reported by two trained spotters. No damage occurred.
EFU	S of McQueen	Harmon	OK	34.583°N 99.70°W	02:29	0.2 mi (0.32 km)	20 yd (18 m)	A brief tornado was observed by a trained spotter. No damage was reported, however, power flashes were observed with this tornado.
EF1	S of Reed	Greer	OK	34.767°N 99.668°W	02:49–02:50	0.7 mi (1.1 km)	50 yd (46 m)	A tornado developed near the community of Russell and moved to the north-northeast. One shed, two tractors, and the porch of a home were damaged at a farm. Two sheds were destroyed at another farm. Some debris was scattered for 1.5 mi (2.4 km).
EF2	NNW of Fowler to WNW of Ensign	Gray	KS	37.4986°N 100.2752°W	03:22–03:38	12.15 mi (19.55 km)	100 yd (91 m)	Near the start of the path, the tornado overturned a pivot irrigation sprinkler. As the tornado moved north-northeast, it snapped eight sturdy power poles, and destroyed a small grain bin. Another pivot irrigation sprinkler was overturned before the tornado lifted. Some ground scouring was observed in farm fields along the path.

=== March 14 event ===
List of confirmed tornadoes – Sunday, March 14, 2021
EF#	Location	County / Parish	State	Start Coord.	Time (UTC)	Path length	Max width
EFU	SE of Wheeler	Cheyenne	KS	39.76°N 101.71°W	17:50–17:51	0.05 mi (0.080 km)	25 yd (23 m)
EFU	A landspout tornado was reported near the Wheeler landfill. No damage occurred.						
EFU	W of Trenton	Hitchcock	NE	40.1675°N 101.0498°W	19:33–19:37	0.42 mi (0.68 km)	50 yd (46 m)
EFU	A photo and report of a landspout tornado was posted on social media. No damage occurred.						

=== March 15 event ===
List of confirmed tornadoes – Monday, March 15, 2021
EF#	Location	County / Parish	State	Start Coord.	Time (UTC)	Path length	Max width
EF0	WNW of Stilwell	Johnson	KS	38.7737°N 94.6992°W	21:30–21:34	1.36 mi (2.19 km)	100 yd (91 m)
EF0	A weak tornado damaged some residences in a neighborhood. A roof was blown off a garage after wind compromised its large entry doors. Several outbuildings were heavily damaged or destroyed.						
EFU	N of Baldwin City	Douglas	KS	38.8016°N 95.1797°W	21:54	0.28 mi (0.45 km)	10 yd (9.1 m)
EFU	A photograph showed a small funnel cloud that likely extended to the ground. No damage was reported.						
EF0	NE of Peculiar	Cass	MO	38.7508°N 94.3943°W	22:12	0.01 mi (0.016 km)	10 yd (9.1 m)
EF0	Brief tornado with no reported damage.						

=== March 16 event ===
List of confirmed tornadoes – Tuesday, March 16, 2021
EF#	Location	County / Parish	State	Start Coord.	Time (UTC)	Path length	Max width	Summary
EF1	N of Sand Hill	Copiah	MS	31.7611°N 90.3494°W	00:03–00:06	1.39 mi (2.24 km)	100 yd (91 m)	Trees were snapped or uprooted, large tree branches were broken off, and a few power lines were downed.
EF0	NNE of New Hebron	Simpson	MS	31.7748°N 89.9611°W	00:58–00:59	0.52 mi (0.84 km)	50 yd (46 m)	A house and barn sustained minor roof damage, and a few trees were downed.

=== March 17 event ===
List of confirmed tornadoes – Wednesday, March 17, 2021
EF#	Location	County / Parish	State	Start Coord.	Time (UTC)	Path length	Max width	Summary
EF2	N of Strengthford to NW of Waynesboro	Wayne	MS	31.6491°N 88.9066°W	17:03–17:22	13.1 mi (21.1 km)	325 yd (297 m)	Several chicken houses were destroyed, a mobile home sustained roof damage, and many trees were downed, including numerous large pine trees. In November 2023, this tornado was reanalyzed and had its track receive cosmetic updates based on Worldview satellite imagery.
EF0	Intercourse	Sumter	AL	32.4134°N 88.2421°W	17:31–17:32	0.35 mi (0.56 km)	70 yd (64 m)	A brief tornado ripped shingles from a home, uprooted trees, and snapped large tree limbs.
EF2	E of Selma to Burnsville	Dallas	AL	32.4240°N 86.9542°W	17:32–17:45	5.08 mi (8.18 km)	1,000 yd (910 m)	Most of the damage associated with this low-end EF2 tornado occurred in the Burnsville area. A well built home sustained loss of its carport, roof damage, broken windows, and partial loss of one wall. An unanchored manufactured home was completely destroyed, with remnants blown across a road and scattered over 100 yards (91 m), and a vehicle at this residence was rolled and damaged. A second manufactured home with some anchors was rolled and blown apart, with two people inside sustaining minor injuries. Several more homes sustained roof damage, and a two-story home sustained structural damage both from wind and from falling trees. Many trees and several power lines were downed along the path.
EF1	SE of Livingston to SE of Epes	Sumter	AL	32.5390°N 88.1341°W	17:57–18:15	9.78 mi (15.74 km)	475 yd (434 m)	A mobile home was shifted from its blocks, outbuildings were destroyed, and several structures sustained roof damage. Numerous trees were snapped or uprooted.
EF1	NE of Brookhaven	Lincoln	MS	31.5903°N 90.3218°W	18:16–18:27	6.16 mi (9.91 km)	120 yd (110 m)	One house lost half its roof, a couple mobile homes had the skirting blown off, and several sheds were damaged. Many trees were downed along the path.
EF1	ENE of Billingsley	Autauga	AL	32.6621°N 86.6920°W	18:24–18:27	2.87 mi (4.62 km)	150 yd (140 m)	One home sustained minor roof damage, and numerous trees were downed, a few of which caused roof and porch damage to a second home.
EF1	E of Clanton	Chilton	AL	32.8165°N 86.5539°W	18:56–19:03	3.04 mi (4.89 km)	500 yd (460 m)	Farm buildings and an outbuilding were damaged, and several trees were downed.
EF0	W of Demopolis	Marengo	AL	32.5117°N 87.8866°W	19:03–19:05	0.83 mi (1.34 km)	175 yd (160 m)	A couple of buildings sustained minor damage, and several trees were downed.
EF1	NNW of Akron to E of Stokes	Hale, Tuscaloosa	AL	32.9081°N 87.7584°W	19:12–19:55	22.03 mi (35.45 km)	550 yd (500 m)	Numerous homes and other structures, including a post office, an apartment building, and a church, were damaged in Moundville. To the south and southeast of Tuscaloosa, a few mobile homes were destroyed and campers were flipped. Many trees were downed along the path.
EF1	SW of Sweet Water	Marengo	AL	32.0678°N 87.9015°W	19:22–19:27	2.77 mi (4.46 km)	500 yd (460 m)	Numerous trees were snapped along the path.
EF1	W of Farmerville	Union	LA	32.7643°N 92.4998°W	19:26–19:33	2.64 mi (4.25 km)	766 yd (700 m)	A chicken house and a picnic pavilion were damaged, and many trees were snapped or uprooted, especially as the tornado moved through Lake D'Arbonne State Park. Several trees fell on homes and vehicles.
EF0	Unity	Coosa	AL	33.0063°N 86.3522°W	19:29–19:31	0.13 mi (0.21 km)	25 yd (23 m)	A brief tornado uprooted a pine tree and snapped several tree branches in the rural community of Unity.
EF1	NW of Coaling	Tuscaloosa	AL	33.1907°N 87.3795°W	20:09–20:11	0.53 mi (0.85 km)	150 yd (140 m)	This tornado produced damage around Lake Wildwood, consisting of downed trees and minor structural damage.
EF1	NNE of Brookwood	Tuscaloosa	AL	33.2887°N 87.2997°W	20:25–20:34	3.51 mi (5.65 km)	650 yd (590 m)	The same supercell responsible for producing the Moundville and Lake Wildwood tornadoes produced a third tornado, which damaged a metal warehouse, with roofing and siding being thrown. Antennas were bent on a communications tower, and many trees were downed as well.
EF2	E of Waynesboro, MS to ESE of Putnam, AL	Wayne (MS), Choctaw (AL), Clarke (AL), Marengo (AL)	MS, AL	31.6842°N 88.4855°W	20:44–21:40	36.59 mi (58.89 km)	500 yd (460 m)	The tornado quickly moved into Alabama after touching down just west of the Mississippi state line, where damage was limited to downed trees. In Choctaw County, several chicken houses were severely damaged, and many softwood and hardwood trees were snapped or uprooted. The tornado then struck Silas, where trees were downed, and outbuildings and homes sustained minor damage. The tornado reached peak intensity as it approached the Tombigbee River and crossed into Clarke County, where a large swath of significant tree damage occurred. Some river camp homes in the area sustained roof damage, mobile homes were damaged, and an older, site-built home was heavily damaged, with two people inside being injured. The tornado weakened and continued into Marengo County, where it snapped and uprooted numerous trees as it crossed SR 69 before dissipating. In November 2023, this tornado was reanalyzed and had its track receive cosmetic updates based on Planet satellite imagery.
EF1	Kellerman to SW of Oak Grove	Tuscaloosa, Jefferson	AL	33.3369°N 87.3097°W	20:54–21:06	5.81 mi (9.35 km)	650 yd (590 m)	Numerous trees were snapped or uprooted by this high-end EF1 tornado. The tornado dissipated just after crossing the county line.
EF0	W of Safford	Dallas	AL	32.2850°N 87.4280°W	21:11–21:13	1.07 mi (1.72 km)	75 yd (69 m)	Trees and tree branches were downed.
EF1	Maytown	Jefferson	AL	33.5371°N 87.0217°W	21:30–21:38	2.77 mi (4.46 km)	650 yd (590 m)	Structures sustained minor damage in the town of Maytown, and several trees were snapped or uprooted as well.
EF0	SE of McGehee	Desha	AR	33.6201°N 91.3797°W	21:37–21:38	0.1 mi (0.16 km)	10 yd (9.1 m)	The brief tornado touched down in an empty farm field causing no damage. The tornado was rated based on radar data, video from a storm chaser, and photographs.
EF0	Sweet Water	Marengo	AL	32.0921°N 87.8699°W	21:54–21:58	1.75 mi (2.82 km)	75 yd (69 m)	Large tree branches were snapped in Sweet Water.
EF0	NNW of Gardendale	Jefferson	AL	33.6619°N 86.8534°W	21:56–22:04	3.46 mi (5.57 km)	660 yd (600 m)	Numerous trees were downed, some of which caused minor damage to homes and vehicles. One person was injured.
EF0	SSE of Doloroso	Wilkinson	MS	31.2330°N 91.3113°W	22:06–22:07	0.84 mi (1.35 km)	100 yd (91 m)	Trees were damaged and uprooted, with large branches broken.
EF2	N of Billingsley	Chilton	AL	32.6746°N 86.7364°W	22:12–22:23	5.84 mi (9.40 km)	400 yd (370 m)	A high-end EF2 tornado struck just south of Pools Crossroads, where an unanchored home was shifted off its foundation, a double-wide mobile home and a large outbuilding were completely destroyed, some exterior walls of a brick house were collapsed, and outbuildings were damaged. Additionally, another home sustained roof damage, a vehicle was moved 15 feet (4.6 m), and many trees were snapped or uprooted.
EF1	SE of Cassville to ESE of Crane	Barry, Stone	MO	36.6°N 93.82°W	22:30–23:30	23.73 mi (38.19 km)	75 yd (69 m)	Shingles were removed from a mobile home, outbuildings were destroyed, and many trees were downed along an intermittent path.
EF1	SW of Rosa to S of Susan Moore	Blount	AL	33.9227°N 86.5587°W	22:43–23:05	12.89 mi (20.74 km)	300 yd (270 m)	An outbuilding was destroyed, a porch was blown off a mobile home, and many trees were snapped and uprooted.
EF0	W of Purvis	Lamar	MS	31.1532°N 89.6130°W	23:16–23:17	1.42 mi (2.29 km)	300 yd (270 m)	A house lost most of its roof, a couple sheds were destroyed, and several trees were downed, one of which fell through a mobile home.
EF0	SW of Okolona	Chickasaw	MS	33.9519°N 88.8160°W	00:25–00:26	0.5 mi (0.80 km)	50 yd (46 m)	A barn sustained roof damage, and several trees were downed.
EF0	NW of Okolona	Chickasaw	MS	34.0296°N 88.8041°W	00:31–00:34	1.36 mi (2.19 km)	100 yd (91 m)	An outbuilding was destroyed and several trees were downed.
EF0	Nettleton	Monroe, Lee	MS	34.0783°N 88.6295°W	00:39–00:47	4.86 mi (7.82 km)	60 yd (55 m)	A structure sustained roof damage, and several trees were downed along an intermittent path from Nettleton to northeast of town.
EF0	W of Porterville	Kemper	MS	32.689°N 88.5223°W	00:56–00:57	0.24 mi (0.39 km)	80 yd (73 m)	Trees were uprooted and tree branches were broken.
EF0	WSW of Oak Grove	Autauga	AL	32.6004°N 86.6099°W	01:35–01:36	0.13 mi (0.21 km)	75 yd (69 m)	A brief tornado destroyed a metal outbuilding. A carport was lofted, landing in an open field. Trees and tree branches were snapped.
EF1	SW of Fairview to NW of Baileyton	Cullman	AL	34.1997°N 86.7521°W	02:31–02:43	8.47 mi (13.63 km)	150 yd (140 m)	Several sheds were either damaged or destroyed, a garage was severely damaged, several large farm sheds were demolished, and two houses sustained partial roof loss. Additionally, several chicken houses had roofing and siding removed, large outbuildings sustained roof damage, and numerous trees were downed.
EF0	NNW of Pine Level	Montgomery	AL	32.1279°N 86.0797°W	03:43–03:44	0.3 mi (0.48 km)	140 yd (130 m)	A farmhouse sustained roof damage, both from wind and from a falling tree. A playhouse and a trampoline were destroyed, a fence sustained minor damage, and several trees were snapped or uprooted.

'

=== March 18 event ===
List of confirmed tornadoes – Thursday, March 18, 2021
EF#	Location	County / Parish	State	Start Coord.	Time (UTC)	Path length	Max width	Summary
EF1	NE of Brantley	Crenshaw	AL	31.5920°N 86.2435°W	09:08–09:10	0.52 mi (0.84 km)	150 yd (140 m)	Numerous trees were downed, and the roof was removed from an outbuilding.
EF1	W of Dothan	Houston	AL	31.2125°N 85.5527°W	10:27–10:37	5.24 mi (8.43 km)	150 yd (140 m)	A double-wide mobile home sustained significant roof loss, a large carport over an RV was completely destroyed, and an outbuilding lost most of its roof and had some walls partially collapsed. Several farm structures sustained mostly roof damage, two homes sustained roof damage, and one had partial roof loss on the second story. A boat and trailer were picked up and rolled/rotated 180 degrees, being left 75–100 yards (69–91 m) away. Numerous trees were downed along the path, and one person was injured.
EF0	NW of Kinsey	Houston, Henry	AL	31.3047°N 85.3825°W	10:49–10:52	2.08 mi (3.35 km)	50 yd (46 m)	A carport was damaged, and small trees and limbs were snapped.
EF0	ENE of Ebro	Washington	FL	30.47°N 85.81°W	11:02–11:04	1.56 mi (2.51 km)	25 yd (23 m)	A TDS appeared on radar in a forested area. Tree damage was found, but no structural damage was reported.
EF0	Northwest Florida Beaches International Airport	Bay	FL	30.3373°N 85.8082°W	11:03–11:04	3.94 mi (6.34 km)	100 yd (91 m)	Buildings sustained minor damage at the airport, and trees were downed.
EF1	Bayou George	Bay	FL	30.2631°N 85.5294°W	11:25–11:26	0.37 mi (0.60 km)	50 yd (46 m)	Several homes were damaged in Bayou George, and trees were downed.
EF0	E of Blakely	Early	GA	31.36°N 84.88°W	11:44–11:50	3.14 mi (5.05 km)	50 yd (46 m)	A TDS appeared on radar in a forested area. Tree damage was found, but no structural damage was reported.
EF0	ENE of Woods	Liberty	FL	30.36°N 84.9°W	12:40	0.01 mi (0.016 km)	25 yd (23 m)	A brief TDS appeared on radar in a forested area. Tree damage was found, but no structural damage was reported.
EF1	S of Sasser	Terrell	GA	31.6743°N 84.3793°W	12:49–12:52	3.99 mi (6.42 km)	200 yd (180 m)	A house sustained roof damage, and numerous trees were snapped or uprooted.
EF1	S of Leesburg to W of Oakfield	Lee	GA	31.6791°N 84.172°W	13:06–13:17	10.42 mi (16.77 km)	50 yd (46 m)	Over half the roof was removed from a home and an attached carport was ripped off and thrown several feet. A shed was destroyed, the wall of a large garage was bowed outward, and a trampoline was tossed a short distance. Many trees were snapped or uprooted, including several large pines and a large oak that fell on another home.
EF0	N of Bristol	Pierce	GA	31.4715°N 82.2066°W	17:38–17:40	0.1 mi (0.16 km)	5 yd (4.6 m)	A brief tornado spotted by emergency management downed four trees.
EF0	NW of Trenton to Alachua	Gilchrist, Alachua	FL	29.7254°N 82.6750°W	18:46–19:05	12.5 mi (20.1 km)	100 yd (91 m)	A barn collapsed onto a tractor near the beginning of the path. A carport sustained roof damage in Alachua and multiple trees were downed, including one that fell on a car.
EF1	NNW of Archdale	Guilford	NC	35.93°N 79.99°W	21:01–21:10	2.63 mi (4.23 km)	500 yd (460 m)	Numerous homes and businesses sustained minor to moderate damage, and trees were downed.
EF1	Whitsett to S of Elon	Guilford, Alamance	NC	36.0629°N 79.5485°W	21:38–21:44	2.52 mi (4.06 km)	200 yd (180 m)	The roofs were blown off multiple houses. Numerous trees and power lines were downed.
EF1	SW of Carr to NW of McDade	Orange	NC	36.17°N 79.249°W	22:04–22:10	4.25 mi (6.84 km)	200 yd (180 m)	Numerous trees and power lines were downed. The roof was blown off a house.
EF0	Walters	Isle of Wight	VA	36.7597°N 76.8566°W	01:27–01:31	4.18 mi (6.73 km)	150 yd (140 m)	A pole barn was knocked down, a garage was destroyed, a house sustained roof damage, and a church lost most of its roof. Trees and tree limbs were downed along the path.

=== March 19 event ===
List of confirmed tornadoes – Friday, March 19, 2021
EF#	Location	County / Parish	State	Start Coord.	Time (UTC)	Path length	Max width
EF0	Ilwaco	Pacific	WA	46.3177°N 124.0062°W	03:04–03:08	0.3 mi (0.48 km)	60 yd (55 m)
EF0	Minor damage occurred to trees, fencing, windows, shingles, and other unsecured objects in Ilwaco.						

=== March 22 event ===
List of confirmed tornadoes – Monday, March 22, 2021
EF#	Location	County / Parish	State	Start Coord.	Time (UTC)	Path length	Max width
EFU	S of Paducah	Cottle	TX	33.9621°N 100.3°W	00:44	0.01 mi (0.016 km)	20 yd (18 m)
EFU	A very brief tornado was reported by a trained spotter along the leading edge of a thunderstorm. No damage occurred.						

=== March 23 event ===
List of confirmed tornadoes – Tuesday, March 23, 2021
EF#	Location	County / Parish	State	Start Coord.	Time (UTC)	Path length	Max width
EF1	Canyon Lake	Comal	TX	29.8757°N 98.2665°W	06:04–06:06	0.35 mi (0.56 km)	250 yd (230 m)
EF1	A single family home was damaged, two power poles were snapped, and sporadic tree damage occurred.						
EF1	Washington	St. Landry	LA	30.6092°N 92.0619°W	12:22–12:24	0.91 mi (1.46 km)	50 yd (46 m)
EF1	A brief tornado severely damaged several roofs and snapped several trees in Washington.						
EF0	NNW of Fort Madison	Lee	IA	40.6762°N 91.3471°W	00:19–00:20	0.1 mi (0.16 km)	30 yd (27 m)
EF0	A very brief tornado destroyed a shed, damaged the roof of a home, and damaged trees.						
EF0	NW of Rockport	Pike	IL	39.54°N 91.05°W	00:19–00:22	1.48 mi (2.38 km)	10 yd (9.1 m)
EF0	The tornado tracked mainly across open fields. The condensation funnel did not reach the ground but debris was lofted.						
EF0	NNW of Mason City	Mason	IL	40.2375°N 89.7394°W	03:28–03:34	2.1 mi (3.4 km)	30 yd (27 m)
EF0	Three power poles were snapped at the base.						

=== March 24 event ===
List of confirmed tornadoes – Wednesday, March 24, 2021
EF#	Location	County / Parish	State	Start Coord.	Time (UTC)	Path length	Max width	Summary
EFU	NNE of Aleman	Hamilton	TX	31.69°N 98.01°W	00:03–00:05	0.95 mi (1.53 km)	50 yd (46 m)	The tornado was reported by multiple chasers. No damage was reported.
EFU	NW of Norse	Bosque	TX	31.81°N 97.75°W	00:32–00:35	0.53 mi (0.85 km)	50 yd (46 m)	An intermittent tornado produced no damage.

=== March 25 event ===
List of confirmed tornadoes – Thursday, March 25, 2021
EF#	Location	County / Parish	State	Start Coord.	Time (UTC)	Path length	Max width	Summary
EF3	SE of Moundville Airport to WNW of Low Gap	Hale, Tuscaloosa	AL	32.9386°N 87.5753°W	17:16–17:30	11.11 mi (17.88 km)	1,400 yd (1,300 m)	Hundreds of trees were snapped or uprooted in the Talladega National Forest by this large, strong tornado. Some debarking occurred in northeastern Hale County, and all trees in the direct path were snapped in the worst affected areas, earning a low-end EF3 rating. A large high-end EF1 tornado would move over this same path on November 29, 2022, and a high-end EF2 tornado would move over both previous tornado paths on January 12, 2023.
EF3	SW of West Blocton to Eagle Point to NE of Vandiver	Bibb, Shelby, St. Clair	AL	33.1157°N 87.1707°W	17:53–19:02	50.13 mi (80.68 km)	1,140 yd (1,040 m)	See section on this tornado – Five people were injured.
EF1	S of Memphis, AL	Noxubee (MS), Pickens (AL)	MS, AL	33.0135°N 88.3517°W	18:35–18:42	6.6 mi (10.6 km)	515 yd (471 m)	This multiple-vortex tornado began in Noxubee County, causing no damage as it quickly crossed the state line. Damage in Pickens County consisted of an irrigation pivot being knocked over and a house sustaining roof damage. Several trees were snapped or uprooted along the path.
EF3	SE of Ragland to Southeastern Ohatchee to W of Pleasant Gap	Calhoun, Cherokee	AL	33.7026°N 86.1053°W	19:31–20:27	38.17 mi (61.43 km)	1,700 yd (1,600 m)	6 deaths – See section on this tornado – Ten people were injured.
EF1	NW of Eutaw to SW of Knoxville	Greene	AL	32.8781°N 87.9756°W	20:57–21:16	12.05 mi (19.39 km)	600 yd (550 m)	A barn lost a portion of its roof and numerous trees were snapped or uprooted.
EF0	W of Whitmire	Laurens	SC	34.506°N 81.720°W	20:59–21:02	2.14 mi (3.44 km)	25 yd (23 m)	A weak tornado downed about a dozen trees in the Sumter National Forest.
EF3	W of Greensboro to Eastern Centreville to WSW of Wilsonville	Hale, Perry, Bibb, Chilton, Shelby	AL	32.6892°N 87.7387°W	21:26–23:04	79.66 mi (128.20 km)	2,300 yd (2,100 m)	See section on this tornado – 13 people were injured.
EF1	S of Center Point	Jefferson	AL	33.5686°N 86.707°W	21:48–21:53	4.78 mi (7.69 km)	700 yd (640 m)	This tornado tracked just south of I-59, damaging approximately 42 homes in the Roebuck area just east of Birmingham–Shuttlesworth International Airport. Most of damage to these homes was caused by falling trees.
EF2	E of Butler to NNE of Sweet Water	Choctaw, Marengo	AL	32.13°N 88.04°W	00:10–00:26	12.08 mi (19.44 km)	430 yd (390 m)	In Choctaw County, the tornado heavily damaged a house, shifting it 6 feet (1.8 m) off its foundation, tore the part of the roof from a shed, uprooted several large trees, and snapped a power pole. In Marengo County, a mobile home was destroyed and thrown 50 yards (46 m). A storage building and a barn were destroyed, and another a barn was heavily damaged. Numerous trees were uprooted and snapped. The end point of the path is uncertain, as the tornado moved into an area with no road access. In November 2023, this tornado was reanalyzed and underwent multiple changes. In Choctaw County, the tornado's track was upgraded from EF1 damage to high-end EF2 damage based on widespread tree damage viewable from Worldview satellite imagery. The path length was adjusted from 0.1 mi (0.16 km) to 2.54 mi (4.09 km). The path width was adjusted from 100 yd (91 m) to 430 yd (390 m).
EF2	ENE of Waynesboro to NW of Summertown	Wayne, Lewis, Lawrence	TN	35.34°N 87.71°W	00:30–00:59	22.12 mi (35.60 km)	350 yd (320 m)	This strong tornado destroyed a few outbuildings, ripped the roofs off several homes, and uprooted hundreds of trees. Five TVA high-power electric steel poles were bent, causing widespread power outages in Wayne County. The tornado crossed the Natchez Trace Parkway in the Napier area, causing minor damage. One person sustained minor injuries.
EF1	N of Taylorsville	Bartow	GA	34.092°N 84.9943°W	01:08–01:10	1.68 mi (2.70 km)	125 yd (114 m)	A brief tornado snapped and uprooted numerous trees, with one large tree falling on a cabin. An irrigation pivot was also flipped.
EF1	E of Nolensville to Western Smyrna	Rutherford	TN	35.95°N 86.61°W	01:11–01:14	2.23 mi (3.59 km)	100 yd (91 m)	Dozens of homes sustained minor to moderate roof damage in a residential area on the west side of Smyrna.
EF0	SE of Gladeville	Wilson	TN	36.05°N 86.42°W	01:25–01:28	3.2 mi (5.1 km)	75 yd (69 m)	This tornado touched down just north of the Nashville Superspeedway and moved northeast. Several trees were downed, and several buildings sustained roof damage, including a few warehouses.
EF0	Rosine	Ohio	KY	37.4476°N 86.749°W	01:32–01:33	0.7 mi (1.1 km)	50 yd (46 m)	An intermittent tornado caused minor roof damage to a Dollar General store in town, pushed a mobile home off its foundation, damaged the roof of another, and tore the carport from an RV. Trees were uprooted and snapped and a telephone pole was sheared off.
EF2	NNW of Cooper to ENE of Lyle	Chilton, Coosa	AL	32.8086°N 86.5578°W	02:01–02:21	14.67 mi (23.61 km)	850 yd (780 m)	This tornado downed trees and caused shingle damage in Chilton County. After crossing Lake Mitchell, the tornado reached low-end EF2 intensity, ripping the roofs off of a couple of houses near the lake. More trees were downed northeast of the location before the tornado moved away from the lake and dissipated.
EF0	SE of Clarkson	Grayson	KY	37.4833°N 86.1563°W	02:16–02:17	1 mi (1.6 km)	40 yd (37 m)	Two houses sustained roof, window, and siding damage, a garage was destroyed, and a few trees were snapped and uprooted. Swirl marks were left in a field as well.
EF1	N of Hodgenville	Larue	KY	37.6255°N 85.7671°W	02:44–02:49	4.7 mi (7.6 km)	75 yd (69 m)	Barns were damaged, some significantly. Trees were snapped or uprooted, chain link fence was bent at a 90-degree angle, a lawn mower was blown 50 yards (46 m), and a garbage can was thrown 150 yards (140 m). Swirl marks were left in fields as well.
EF2	W of Wadley to NE of Roanoke	Tallapoosa, Clay, Randolph	AL	33.0942°N 85.771°W	02:55–03:31	31.29 mi (50.36 km)	1,000 yd (910 m)	A large high-end EF2 tornado began in southeast Clay County, striking Sikesville. It then moved northeastward through Randolph County before lifting just shy of the Georgia state line near Wehadkee. Total roof loss occurred and most of the exterior walls were collapsed at two residences, one of which was a 100-year-old cabin. An agricultural building suffered significant structural damage, and numerous homes and a mobile home sustained varying degrees of roof damage. A fire department building was also damaged, and many trees were downed along the path. Minutes later, the same supercell produced the EF4 tornado that impacted Franklin and Newnan, Georgia.
EF4	WSW of Franklin to Newnan to Northern Peachtree City	Heard, Coweta, Fayette	GA	33.2533°N 85.1895°W	03:37–04:30	38.56 mi (62.06 km)	1,850 yd (1,690 m)	See section on this tornado – One indirect fatality was attributed to this tornado as a result of a medical issue.
EF1	Northern Cartersville	Bartow	GA	34.213°N 84.833°W	03:55–04:00	2.76 mi (4.44 km)	200 yd (180 m)	The windows, doors, and portions of a wall were blown out at a gas station in the northern part of Cartersville. Large portions of the roof of a warehouse were peeled back, with metal panels thrown hundreds of yards. Several homes in the area had shingles and sections of their roofs peeled back. Many trees were snapped and uprooted, with some falling on homes. No warning was issued for this tornado, and five people were injured.

=== March 26 event ===
List of confirmed tornadoes – Friday, March 26, 2021
EF#	Location	County / Parish	State	Start Coord.	Time (UTC)	Path length	Max width	Summary
EF1	NE of Middlebury	Addison	VT	44.0267°N 73.1449°W	17:40–17:41	0.65 mi (1.05 km)	75 yd (69 m)	A barrel was thrown into the window of a home, shattering it. Softwood trees were snapped or uprooted. A garage attached to a home was blown off its foundation and collapsed, and the roof of the home was also damaged. A car was also flipped, and multiple farm buildings lost roofing. More trees were snapped before the tornado dissipated. Two people were injured. This became the second confirmed March tornado to occur in Vermont in recorded history.

=== March 27 event ===
List of confirmed tornadoes – Saturday, March 27, 2021
EF#	Location	County / Parish	State	Start Coord.	Time (UTC)	Path length	Max width	Summary
EF1	SE of Huron	Chester, Henderson	TN	35.53°N 88.528°W	21:38–21:44	2.97 mi (4.78 km)	300 yd (270 m)	A home lost part of its roof and several storage buildings were damaged or destroyed. Many trees were snapped or uprooted along the path, one of which landed on a home and caused roof damage.
EF0	NW of Reagan	Henderson	TN	35.5452°N 88.3671°W	21:54–21:55	0.57 mi (0.92 km)	50 yd (46 m)	A brief tornado uprooted trees.
EF0	S of Perryville	Decatur	TN	35.554°N 88.064°W	22:12–22:13	0.48 mi (0.77 km)	75 yd (69 m)	Video was taken of a tornado over open country. No damage occurred.
EF0	NE of Whitton	Mississippi	AR	35.5192°N 90.2531°W	23:01–23:02	0.68 mi (1.09 km)	50 yd (46 m)	Trees were uprooted and a power pole was damaged.
EF2	SW of Rusk to NW of Sacul	Cherokee, Nacogdoches	TX	31.6884°N 95.2293°W	23:04–23:38	20.53 mi (33.04 km)	500 yd (460 m)	Mainly tree damage occurred along the path of this tornado, with large tree trunks snapped in some areas. A metal outbuilding was severely damaged, and a house had its metal roof peeled back as well.
EF0	W of Bassett	Mississippi	AR	35.5376°N 90.1708°W	23:11–23:13	1.09 mi (1.75 km)	80 yd (73 m)	A brief tornado crossed I-55, uprooting trees, blowing down a sign, and blowing over a semi.
EF0	NNW of Parkin	Cross	AR	35.34°N 90.61°W	23:16–23:17	0.45 mi (0.72 km)	50 yd (46 m)	A brief tornado that was spotted by a storm chaser caused no damage.
EF1	S of Marie to N of Driver	Mississippi	AR	35.5998°N 90.0819°W	23:21–23:27	3.9 mi (6.3 km)	100 yd (91 m)	Power poles were broken along AR 14 south of Marie. Further northeast, a mobile home was heavily damaged, a storage building was destroyed, and tree limbs were damaged.
EF1	SE of Osceola, AR	Mississippi (AR), Lauderdale (TN)	AR, TN	35.6639°N 89.9481°W	23:37–23:45	4.93 mi (7.93 km)	150 yd (140 m)	Just west of the Mississippi River, the tornado broke power poles at an industrial facility. After crossing across the river into Tennessee, the tornado destroyed a barn before dissipating.
EF2	Mount Enterprise to N of Gary City	Rusk, Panola	TX	31.9009°N 94.7138°W	23:59–00:31	22.29 mi (35.87 km)	300 yd (270 m)	A strong tornado first touched down just outside of Mount Enterprise and moved directly through town. Multiple homes sustained roof damage in town, and a few had large portions of their roofs blown off entirely. It then moved into Panola County, causing EF2 damage to trees near Lake Murvaul, damaging outbuildings, and tearing a large section of roof from a church before dissipating. This tornado came from the same storm that produced the EF2 Rusk tornado.
EF1	N of St. Jacob to Highland	Madison	IL	38.7323°N 89.7697°W	00:08–00:15	5.29 mi (8.51 km)	700 yd (640 m)	North of St. Jacob, the tornado toppled several trees and tore part of the roof off a metal shed. Farther east of town, homes sustained minor shingle damage and a power pole was snapped. The tornado then struck Highland, where a large metal shed and a barn were completely destroyed, and other outbuildings were damaged. The roof of the shed was lofted into nearby trees, and a wooden 2x4 from the shed penetrated the roof of a nearby building. Trees and power lines were downed in town, homes sustained shingle and soffit damage, a semi-trailer was tipped over, and a trampoline was thrown.
EF2	E of Carthage	Panola	TX	32.0982°N 94.3089°W	00:38–01:05	15.84 mi (25.49 km)	1,600 yd (1,500 m)	1 death – This large, strong wedge tornado touched shortly after the previous EF2 tornado dissipated, damaging numerous trees and homes along its path. Some homes sustained major structural damage, including several that had their roofs torn off, and one that had its entire second floor blown away and destroyed, with partial collapse of exterior walls on the first floor. Another house was pushed off of its block foundation, and a mobile home was swept away and completely destroyed. Outbuildings were also destroyed, with sheet metal wrapped around trees, and a truck was thrown 50 yd (46 m). A metal fire department building had an exterior wall ripped off as well. Many trees were snapped or uprooted, and one tree fell on a manufactured home, killing a person and injuring another.
EF1	W of Keatchie	De Soto, Caddo	LA	32.1792°N 93.9851°W	01:08–01:13	3.5 mi (5.6 km)	480 yd (440 m)	This tornado came from the same storm that produced the three EF2 tornadoes in Texas. Numerous trees were snapped or uprooted.
EF2	S of Reydell to ESE of De Witt	Jefferson, Arkansas	AR	34.1548°N 91.5722°W	01:23–01:54	18.56 mi (29.87 km)	600 yd (550 m)	Power poles were snapped near Reydell at the beginning of the path of this strong stovepipe tornado. In Arkansas County to the south of De Witt, several structures were damaged or destroyed, with the most significant damage occurring at the intersection of US 165 and AR 276. A rice mill sustained severe damage at this location, and a large metal grain silo was lofted from this structure and carried several hundred yards into a field. A nearby mobile home was destroyed, and additional power poles were snapped in this area. Minor tree and outbuilding damage occurred farther along the path before the tornado dissipated.
EF1	Southern Stonewall to NNE of Frierson	De Soto, Caddo	LA	32.2378°N 93.8364°W	01:22–01:41	11.97 mi (19.26 km)	675 yd (617 m)	This tornado was the last of a long-lived tornado family that started near Rusk, Texas. It first struck the south edge of Stonewall, where a detached garage was destroyed, homes sustained roof damage, and trees were downed. Additional damage to trees and an outbuilding occurred farther along the path, and a house sustained shingle damage and also had its chimney blown over before the tornado dissipated.
EF2	Northern Monticello	Drew	AR	33.6655°N 91.883°W	03:22–03:25	1.6 mi (2.6 km)	400 yd (370 m)	This strong tornado struck the north edge of Monticello, and tossed multiple construction company trucks up to 100 yd (91 m) into a field, leaving them severely damaged. A trailer was thrown through the front wall of the construction company, which had roof decking torn off and windows blown out. Trees were uprooted and tree limbs were snapped, and several homes in a neighborhood at the beginning of the path also suffered some roof damage.
EF1	Independence	Tate	MS	34.6992°N 89.8239°W	03:45–03:50	2.04 mi (3.28 km)	100 yd (91 m)	This tornado moved directly through the rural community of Independence. A total of three mobile homes were destroyed, and 17 structures were damaged. An old school building sustained roof and window damage.
EF0	Southern Rosedale	Bolivar	MS	33.8493°N 91.028°W	04:26–04:27	0.44 mi (0.71 km)	35 yd (32 m)	This high-end EF0 tornado moved through the south side of Rosedale, ripping a large portion of a metal roof off of a church and damaging its siding and façade. Homes and trees sustained minor damage as well.
EF2	SE of Shelby	Bolivar	MS	33.9369°N 90.7536°W	04:46–04:51	2.91 mi (4.68 km)	50 yd (46 m)	The tornado touched down southeast of Shelby and immediately became strong as it struck a house, ripping off its roof and collapsing some exterior walls. A nearby propane tank was shifted, and an outbuilding was destroyed. The tornado then moved northeast and weakened, destroying five empty grain bins and damaging trees before dissipating in an open field.

=== March 28 event ===
List of confirmed tornadoes – Sunday, March 28, 2021
EF#	Location	County / Parish	State	Start Coord.	Time (UTC)	Path length	Max width	Summary
EF1	SSW of Fairview	Cullman	AL	34.1904°N 86.74°W	10:38–10:42	2.11 mi (3.40 km)	100 yd (91 m)	A couple of farm outbuildings were destroyed and numerous hardwood and softwood trees were uprooted and snapped.

=== March 30 event ===
List of confirmed tornadoes – Tuesday, March 30, 2021
EF#	Location	County / Parish	State	Start Coord.	Time (UTC)	Path length	Max width
EF0	ENE of Sumrall to SE of Seminary	Covington	MS	31.4387°N 89.4472°W	23:04–23:14	3.55 mi (5.71 km)	150 yd (140 m)
EF0	Tree limbs were broken and a few trees were uprooted.						
EF1	E of Farmerville	Union	LA	32.7476°N 92.2598°W	01:54–01:56	1.18 mi (1.90 km)	105 yd (96 m)
EF1	A small metal outbuilding was destroyed near the Nolan Place subdivision. One home had minor roof damage. Many softwood and hardwood trees were snapped or uprooted along the path.						

=== March 31 event ===
List of confirmed tornadoes – Wednesday, March 31, 2021
EF#	Location	County / Parish	State	Start Coord.	Time (UTC)	Path length	Max width
EF0	Vardaman	Calhoun	MS	33.8714°N 89.1842°W	05:24–05:26	1.21 mi (1.95 km)	80 yd (73 m)
EF0	A portion of brick veneer was removed from a school building in town. Awnings and trees were also damaged, and some trees fell onto homes and vehicles.						
EF1	Hatley	Monroe	MS	33.9764°N 88.4225°W	06:49–06:57	4.27 mi (6.87 km)	200 yd (180 m)
EF1	Several sheds were damaged or destroyed. Several homes in Hatley had minor roof damage, and trees and power poles were damaged.						
EF0	WNW to N of Marion County Public Lake	Marion	AL	34.0606°N 87.9958°W	07:31–07:34	1.63 mi (2.62 km)	90 yd (82 m)
EF0	Large tree branches were broken and several softwood trees were uprooted.						
EF1	S of Nesmith	Winston, Cullman	AL	34.1591°N 87.1281°W	08:45–08:48	1.19 mi (1.92 km)	305 yd (279 m)
EF1	One home suffered significant loss of its roof covering and its carport was destroyed. A metal barn lost nearly all of its roof and another barn lost a few metal roof panels. Trees were uprooted and snapped and tree limbs were broken. The tornado dissipated just after crossing into Cullman County, where damage was limited to trees.						
EF1	ESE of Sylvania to SW of Valley Head	DeKalb	AL	34.5247°N 85.7278°W	10:44–10:52	3.17 mi (5.10 km)	50 yd (46 m)
EF1	A row of chicken houses sustained partial roof loss, a well-anchored porch was removed from a manufactured home, and two houses suffered minor damage. Dozens of trees were snapped or uprooted.						
EF0	SSE of Hayden	Blount	AL	33.891°N 86.7379°W	13:15–13:16	0.21 mi (0.34 km)	65 yd (59 m)
EF0	A brief tornado broke tree limbs and uprooted several softwood trees.						

== See also ==
- Tornadoes of 2021
- List of United States tornadoes from October to December 2020
- List of United States tornadoes from April to June 2021
