= Sweetwater High School =

Sweetwater High School may refer to:

- Sweetwater High School (National City, California)
- Sweetwater High School (Texas), Sweetwater, Texas
- Sweetwater High School (Sweetwater, Tennessee)
- Sweet Water High School (Sweet Water, Alabama)
