= Coxheath, Alabama =

Unincorporated community in Alabama, United States

- Unincorporated community
- Location within Alabama Location within the United States
- Coordinates: 32°5′16.51″N 87°54′37.01″W
- Country: United States
- State: Alabama
- County: Marengo
- Elevation: 151 ft (46 m)
- Time zone: UTC-6 (Central (CST))
  - Summer (DST): UTC-5 (CDT)
- Area code: 334

Coxheath is an unincorporated community in Marengo County, Alabama, United States. Coxheath had a post office at one time, but it no longer exists.

Bob Harrington, the evangelist known as the "Chaplain of Bourbon Street," was born in Coxheath.

== Geography ==
Coxheath is located at 32.08792°N 87.91028°W and has an elevation of 151 feet (46 m).
