= Ced Landrum =

American baseball player and coach (born 1963)

- Outfielder
- Born: September 3, 1963 (age 62); Butler, Alabama
- Batted: Left Threw: Right

MLB debut
- May 28, 1991, for the Chicago Cubs

Last MLB appearance
- September 25, 1993, for the New York Mets

MLB statistics
- Batting average: .238
- Home runs: 0
- Runs batted in: 7
- Stolen bases: 27
- Stats at Baseball Reference

Teams
- Chicago Cubs (1991); New York Mets (1993)

Cedric Bernard Landrum (born September 3, 1963) is an American former Major League Baseball outfielder. He played in parts of two seasons in the majors, 1991 for the Chicago Cubs and 1993 for the New York Mets. He has also coached in the minor and independent leagues.

Landrum attended Sweet Water High School in Sweet Water, Alabama. He then attended the University of North Alabama. He set an NCAA Division II record with 69 stolen bases in 1985 and helped the Lions reach two Division II tournaments. He was inducted into the university's athletics hall of fame in 1997.

Landrum signed as an undrafted free agent with the Cubs in 1985 and reached the majors in 1991. That season, he stole 27 bases in 56 games, getting caught just 5 times. He did not attempt any steals in his return to the majors with the Mets in 1993. Of his 78 games in the majors, Landrum appeared 25 times as a pinch runner and 21 times as a pinch hitter.

In 1995, Landrum was a replacement player for the Colorado Rockies in spring training during the ongoing strike. He scored in an exhibition game that was the first game in Coors Field history on March 31. He played for the Triple-A Colorado Springs Sky in 1995, then the Olmecas de Tabasco in the Mexican League in 1996.

Landrum began his coaching career with the Gulf Coast Expos in 1997. He was a coach for Bluefield Orioles in 2002 and Aberdeen IronBirds in 2003 and 2004. He returned to Bluefield in 2005, also serving as a roving minor league outfield instructor. He was the hitting coach of the Joliet JackHammers in 2010 and 2011.

== Personal life ==
Landrum's brother Michael Landrum, briefly played quarterback for the Alabama Crimson Tide in 1979. His son, Senterrio Landrum, played college baseball and football for the Duke Blue Devils from 2002 to 2005. He has one other child.
