= Bob Harrington (preacher) =

American preacher (1927–2017)

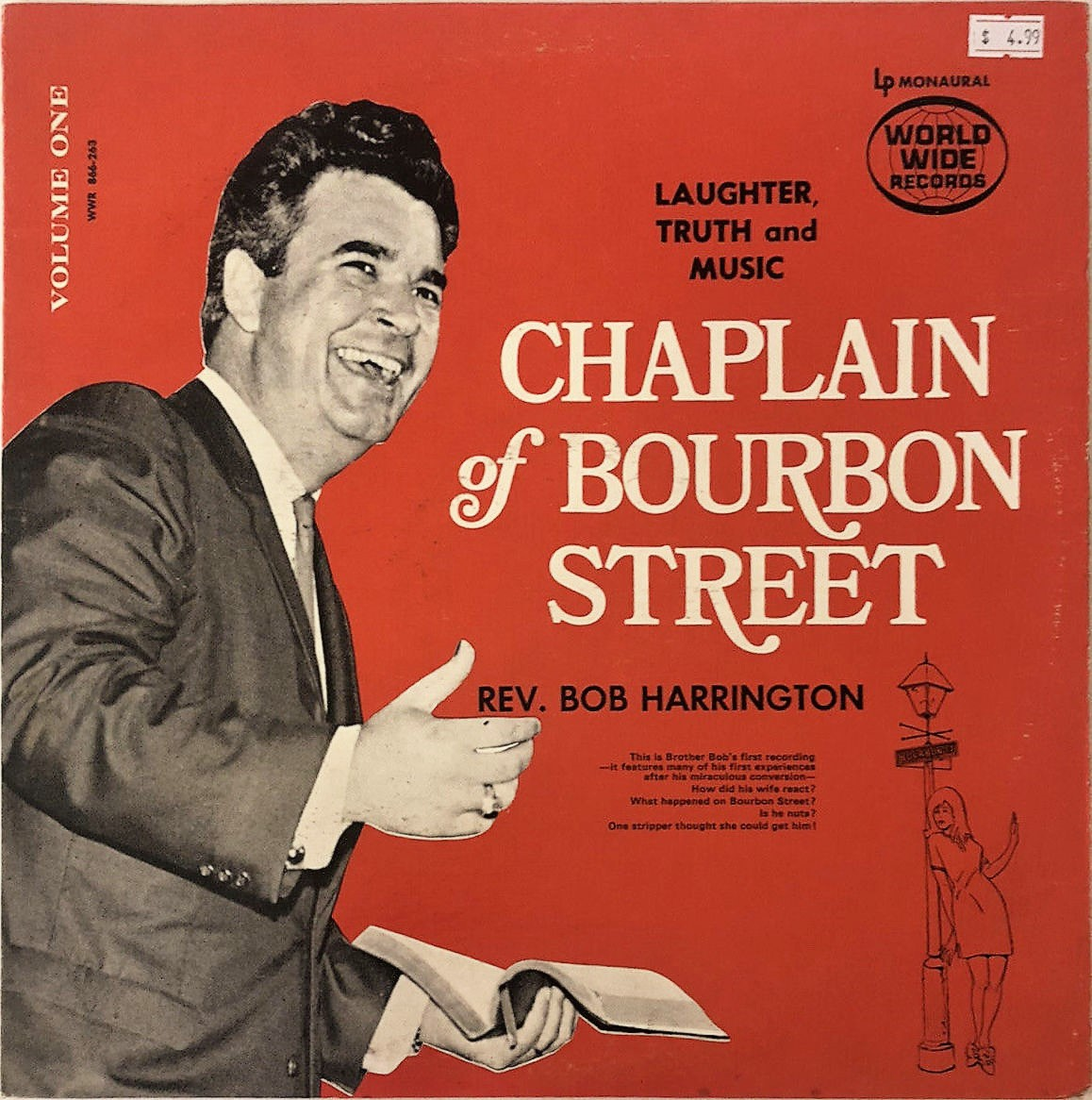
Chaplain Of Bourbon Street, album by Rev. Bob Harrington, 1966

Bob Harrington (September 2, 1927 – July 4, 2017) was an American preacher who became one of the leading evangelists of the 1960s and 1970s. Known as the "Chaplain of Bourbon Street", he gained fame through a series of recordings, books, and most notably a series of debates on the existence of God with prominent atheist Madalyn Murray O'Hair. At the height of his popularity he abandoned his wife and ministry. He became a motivational speaker in Florida, eventually returning to Christian evangelism at the end of his life.

== Early life ==
Harrington was born on September 2, 1927, in Coxheath, Alabama, to a pair of United Methodist ministers, Robert Coleman Harrington and Ludie Shoultz Harrington. He considered Sweet Water, Alabama, to be his hometown. As a young man he entered the United States Navy. Subsequent to leaving the armed service he became a professional photographer and then sold life insurance. He spent time at the Marion Military Institute and the University of Alabama.

== Call to ministry ==
Harrington converted to Christianity at age 30, and began a series of evangelistic crusades. In 1960, he moved his wife Joyce and two daughters to New Orleans in order to attend New Orleans Baptist Theological Seminary.

== Chaplain of Bourbon Street ==
Concurrent to his studies at the seminary, Harrington began street ministry on Bourbon Street very soon after arrival, upon which First Baptist then loaned Harrington the money to open a chapel directly on Bourbon. His activities included preaching outside of the nightclubs, playing gospel music on a loudspeaker system, and sometimes preaching inside bars and strip clubs. Victor H. Schiro gave Harrington the moniker "The Chaplain of Bourbon Street" in 1962. As he became better known, he travelled to preach in such places as Greenwich Village, Las Vegas, Paris, and Vietnam. Harrington authored eight books; the most notable was his autobiography, entitled The Chaplain of Bourbon Street, co-written by Walter Wagner and published 1969 by Doubleday. He also made in excess of 30 LP records. As his notoriety grew he engaged in public feuds with Larry Flynt, who had profiled him in Hustler, and with Madalyn Murray O'Hair.

The debates with O'Hair began August 1977 on local radio stations in Louisiana and Texas. They were produced by Harrington, and featured gospel and patriotic music. An appearance on The Phil Donahue Show debating the existence of Deity proved so popular that a 38-city tour followed. O'Hair was given 44% of the net profits, which earned her $12,500 (equivalent to $109,744 in 2025) that August. Initial publicity was huge, but turned negative as it was theorized it was all staged, being called such things as "deplorable performance, a mocking of deeply-held spiritual belief". Attendance declined as a result, and ended when O'Hair left October 1977. Harrington's other national television exposure included appearing as guest on The Merv Griffin Show and The Tonight Show Starring Johnny Carson. Harrington later admitted the fame significantly affected him.

== Life outside the ministry ==
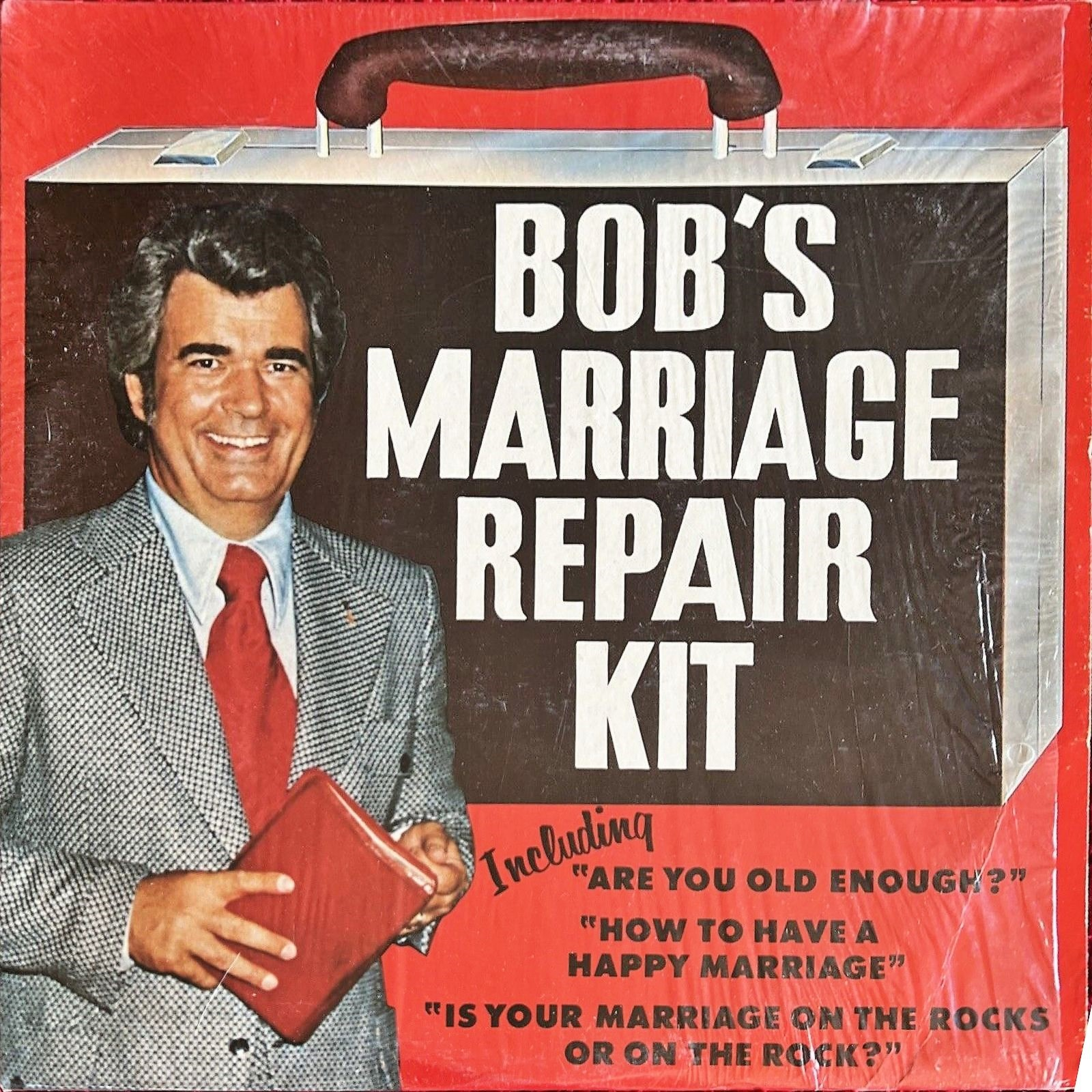
Bob's Marriage Repair Kit, record album by Bob Harrington, 1974

Harrington's Ministry ended in 1977 at the height of his popularity, the result of an extramarital affair. He divorced his first wife and was married the second time to Zonnya, then the Executive Vice-president of his organization. The new couple moved to Clearwater, Florida, where Harrington became a successful motivational speaker for automobile dealers, multilevel marketing and real estate in the 1980s and 1990s. This marriage did not last, and in addition to the divorce he suffered bankruptcy.

Harrington would later account his downfall to "pride, arrogance, self-centeredness and stubbornness". "I was, in effect, flipping the bird to God." He claimed he became famous before he had a solid Christian footing. Referring back to the area that made him famous, he stated that his weakness was not the "Bathshebas, Delilahs and Jezebels" but instead was the "sweet little ol' church members" who fed his ego.

During this time period Harrington eschewed church altogether, going so far as to drive miles out of his way to avoiding even the sight of a steeple. In 1989 Harrington was robbed and severely beaten in his Miami hotel room, an event which Harrington cited as re-kindling his interest in religion. Harrington received a phone call from Rex Humbard in 1990, inviting him back to Christian faith, whereupon he resumed church attendance and bible study.

== Later life, return to ministry ==
By 1997 Harrington was again living in New Orleans, living in an apartment and guest speaking at various churches. He married a third time, to Rebecca Harris Birdwell, and moved to Mansfield, Texas, in 1998 where he resumed his preaching career, now known simply as "The Chaplain". He continued to call out what he considered evil influences in society, such as Jessica Simpson and Ashlee Simpson.

Rebecca died in 2010. Harrington spent the last seven years living near his youngest daughter in Stigler, Oklahoma, where he attended the town's First Baptist Church. There he died of kidney failure on July 4, 2017, having suffered from dementia in his last years.

== Style and influence ==
Television station WWL stated his "flamboyant personality and booming voice" were a great match for a Bourbon Street ministry. Harrington considered himself a "show-off", comparing his methods to some of the more active Biblical stories. His slogan was "It's fun being saved!"

His daughter Rhonda Harrington Kelley taught at the New Orleans Baptist Theological Seminar. She married Chuck Kelley, who was president of that institution from 1996 to 2019.

== Publications ==
Harrington published eight books. Beginning in the late 1950s, he made more than 30 spoken-word phonograph record albums. Two were certified gold, Laughter, Truth and Music and Chaplain of Bourbon Street, the latter of which was the audio track from his first television special. His records have been collected years later for their camp appeal. These recorded sermons were sampled by alternative and experimental rock artists, usually uncredited with Lutefisk as an exception.
