= David Beverly =

American football player (born 1950)

No. 4, 11
- Position: Punter

Personal information
- Born: August 19, 1950 (age 76); Selma, Alabama, U.S.
- Listed height: 6 ft 3 in (1.91 m)
- Listed weight: 195 lb (88 kg)

Career information
- High school: Sweet Water (AL)
- College: Auburn
- NFL draft: 1973: undrafted

Career history
- Buffalo Bills (1973)*; Houston Oilers (1974–1975); Green Bay Packers (1975–1980)
- * Offseason or practice squad member only

Awards and highlights
- First-team All-SEC (1971)

Career NFL statistics
- Punts: 586
- Punt yards: 22,344
- Longest punt: 69
- Stats at Pro Football Reference

David Edward Beverly (born August 19, 1950) is an American former professional football player who was a punter for seven seasons in the National Football League (NFL) for the Houston Oilers and the Green Bay Packers. He played college football for the Auburn Tigers.

Beverly played as quarterback and punter for Sweet Water High School. At the final game of his junior season, he sustained what was thought to be a career-ending knee injury and was unable to play in his senior season.

He enrolled at Auburn University, where he decided to join the football team as a walk-on. While at Auburn, he earned three letters and was named to the 1971 All-Southeastern Conference Team. His net punt yardage averages are still records at Auburn.

After earning his degree, he played for one year for the Houston Oilers in 1974, then went to the Green Bay Packers (1975–80), where he was the starting punter for his tenure there. He still holds the all-time Packer records for career punts (495) and single-season punts (106), with three games in which he punted 10 times, second on the Green Bay list.

Beverly was selected to the Auburn "Team of the Seventies", and was named the best SEC punter of the last 25 years by sports writer Alf Van Hoose. He was also honored in 1973 with a David Beverly Day in Sweet Water.

== NFL career statistics ==
Legend
**Bold**	Career high

Year	Team	Punting									
Year	Team	GP	Punts	Yds	Net Yds	Lng	Avg	Net Avg	Blk	Ins20	TB
1974	HOU	14	79	3,100	2,560	**69**	39.2	32.4	0	-	2
1975	HOU	2	12	459	332	45	38.3	27.7	0	-	1
1975	GNB	10	66	2,482	2,302	55	37.6	**34.9**	0	-	4
1976	GNB	14	83	3,074	2,706	60	37.0	32.2	**1**	16	5
1977	GNB	14	85	3,391	2,920	59	39.9	34.0	**1**	17	**8**
1978	GNB	**16**	**106**	**3,759**	**3,333**	57	35.5	31.4	0	**20**	7
1979	GNB	**16**	69	2,785	2,400	65	**40.4**	34.8	0	11	4
1980	GNB	**16**	86	3,294	2,832	55	38.3	32.9	0	17	6
Career		102	586	22,344	19,385	69	38.1	33.0	2	81	37
