= Marengo County School District =

School district in Alabama

Address
- 101 North Shiloh Street Linden, Alabama, 36748; United States
- Coordinates: 32°18′23″N 87°47′48″W

District information
- Grades: K–12
- Superintendent: Luther Hallmark
- School board: Marengo County Board of Education
- Accreditation(s): Southern Association of Colleges and Schools
- NCES District ID: 0102250

Students and staff
- Students: 960 (2020-2021)
- Staff: 69.00 (on an FTE basis)
- Student–teacher ratio: 13.91

Other information
- Website: www.marengo.k12.al.us

Marengo County School District is the school district for Marengo County, Alabama. The system educates more than 1,500 students and is one of the largest employers in the county with more than 200 employees.

The district is governed by the Marengo County Board of Education. Board members are elected for a term of four years, with one member from each of the county's five voting precincts. A superintendent, hired by the board, and support staff oversee the system on a daily basis. The current superintendent is Luther Hallmark.

The county system operates three K–12 schools: Amelia Love Johnson High School in Thomaston, Marengo High School in Dixons Mills, and Sweet Water High School in Sweet Water. It operated four until it was decided in 2014 that John Essex High School in Demopolis would not reopen after the summer break. The district also operates one alternative school, based in Linden. The Marengo County cities of Demopolis and Linden operate their own independent school systems, the Demopolis City School District and Linden City Schools.

== High schools ==
Amelia L. Johnson High School is a small public school in Thomaston, Alabama serving students from PK to high school. It is one of three high schools in Marengo County. Most of its students are African American and economically disadvantaged.

Marengo High School serves a small predominantly African American student body.

== Failing schools ==
Statewide testing ranks the schools in Alabama. Those in the bottom six percent are listed as "failing." As of early 2018, Amelia L. Johnson High School was included in this category.
