= Sweet Water High School =

Coordinates: 32.09779°N 87.86572°W

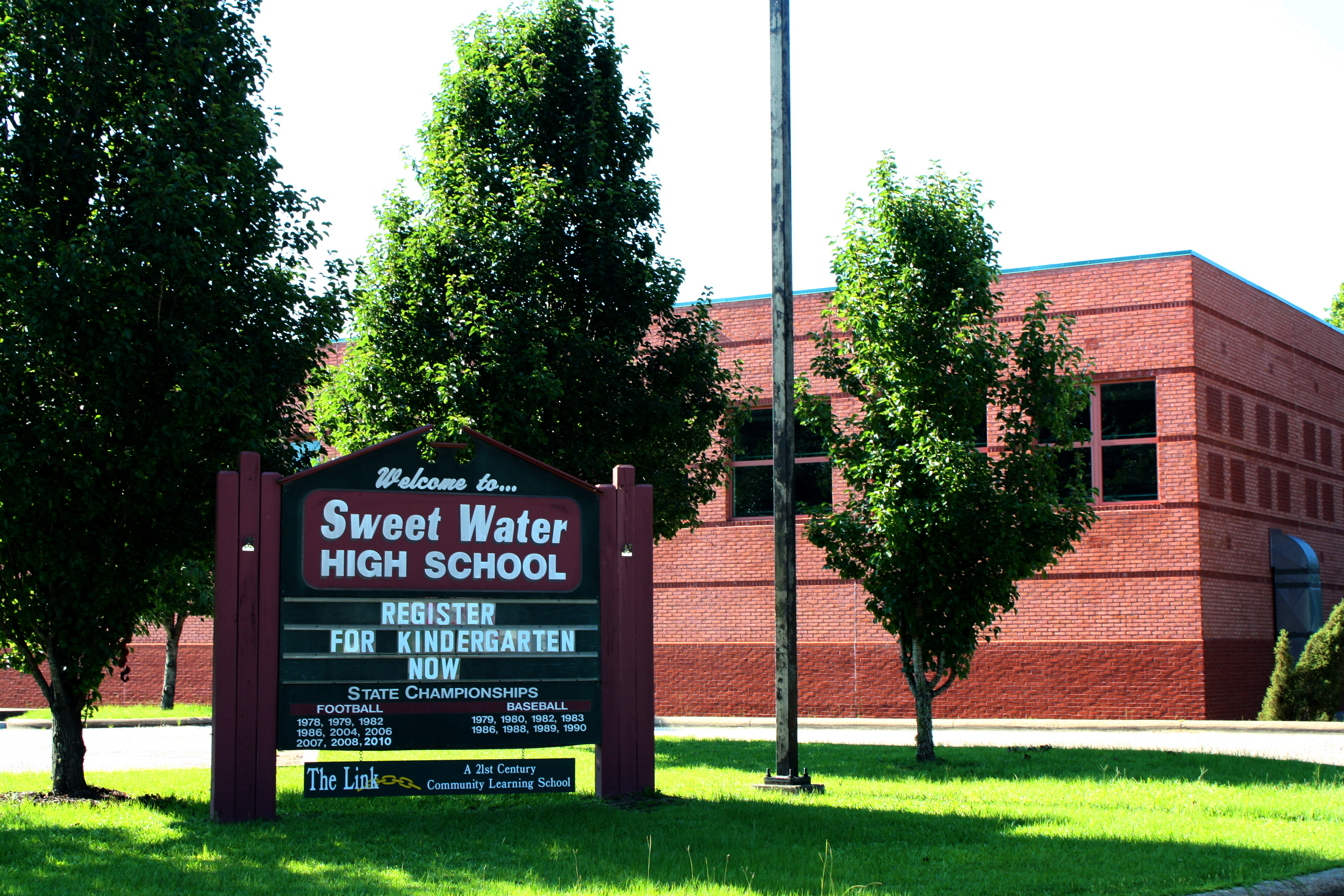

Location
- 440 Main Street; Sweet Water, Alabama 36782; United States

Information
- Type: Public high school
- Established: 1870s
- CEEB code: 012550
- NCES School ID: 010225000857
- Principal: Becky A. Williams
- Teaching staff: 37 (on FTE basis)
- Grades: K-12
- Enrollment: 558 (2021-22)
- Student to teacher ratio: 15.08 (2021-22)
- Education system: Marengo County School District
- Campus type: Rural
- Colors: Purple and gold
- Mascot: Bulldog
- Newspaper: The Paw Print Press
- Yearbook: Swahelian
- Website: swhsmarengoal.marengo.k12.al.us

Sweet Water High School is a public high school that educates grades K–12 in the town of Sweet Water, Alabama, United States. It is one of three K–12 schools operated by the Marengo County School District. Sweet Water High School is accredited by the Southern Association of Colleges and Schools. Enrollment for the 2021-2022 school year was 558.

== Academics ==
=== Curriculum ===
In addition to elementary and middle school education, Sweet Water High School is a secondary school along the classic American model. The school curriculum includes traditional high school academic subjects, advanced academic classes, music and art. All students take a basic academic core including English, social studies, science, and mathematics courses.

== History ==
The first school in Sweet Water was established in a log building in the 1850s. The first incarnation of the modern school dates to the 1870s, when a two-story frame building, topped with a cupola, was built near the current school site on the northeastern side of the junction of Main Street and Wayne Road. It was founded by Edward Quinney on property donated by Ivey McClure.

The school moved to its present location in 1924, following the completion of a new campus. The late 1920s saw some consolidation of Marengo County schools, with children from former schools in Beaver Creek, Exmoor, and Aimwell moved to Sweet Water. The schools at Dixons Mills and Nanafalia were consolidated into Sweet Water in 1950 and 1961, respectively. New buildings were added to the campus in 1960, 1982, 1989, 1997, and 2001.

== Extracurricular ==
Sweet Water High School offers the following academic clubs, athletic teams, and service organizations.

=== Clubs and organizations ===
- Bulldog Update
- Family, Career, and Community Leaders of America
- Partners Assistant Learner
- Student Government Association
- Students Against Destructive Decisions
- Swahelian
- Voices of Praise
- Junior High Beta Club
- Senior High Beta Club
- SWHS Bulldog Marching Band

=== Athletics ===
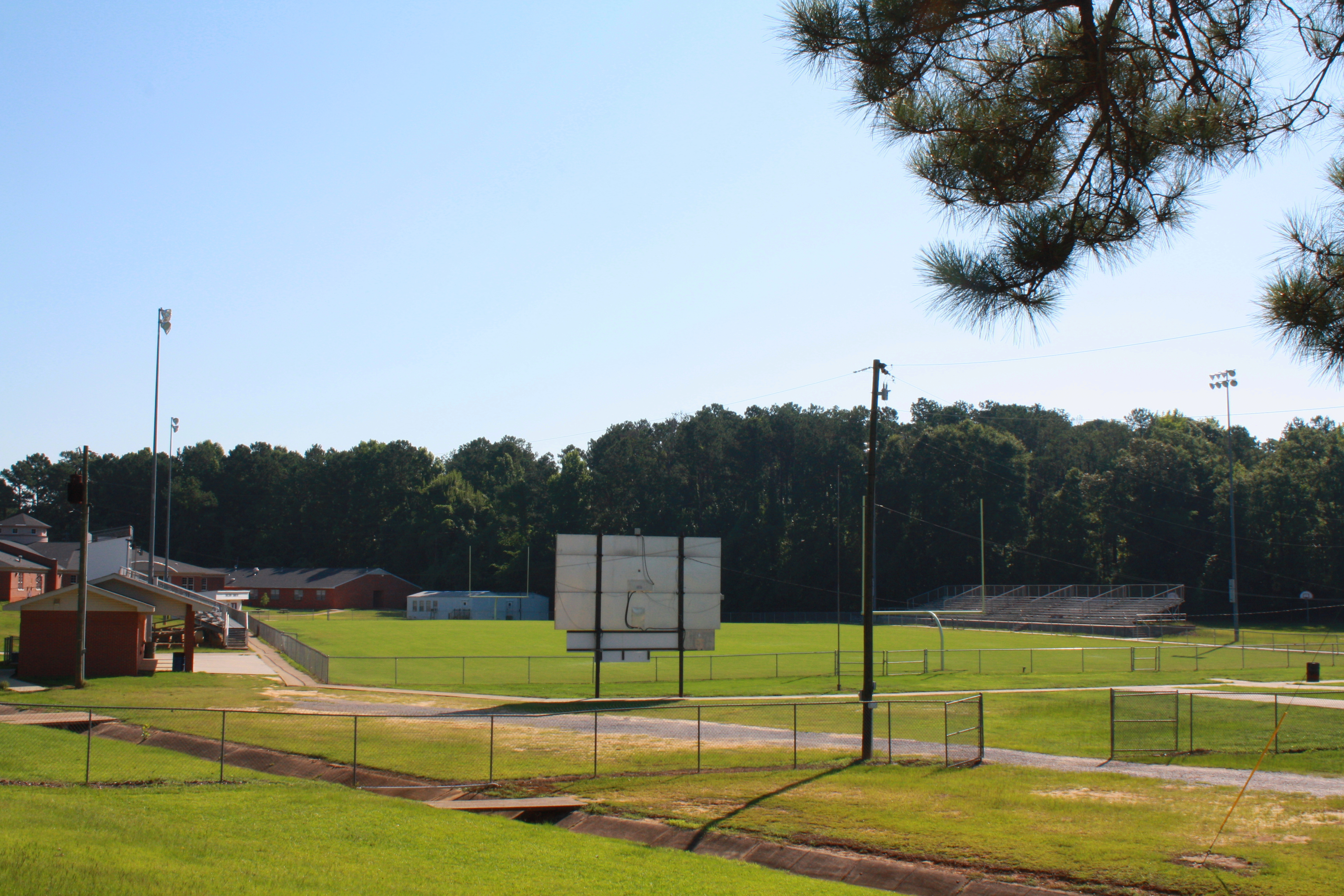
View of Nolan Atkins Stadium at the school.

- Junior Varsity Basketball
- Junior Varsity Cheerleading
- Junior Varsity Football
- Middle School Basketball
- Varsity Baseball (State Champions: 1979 [1A], 1980 [1A], 1982 [1A], 1983 [1A], 1986 [1A], 1988 [1A], 1989 [2A], 1990 [2A], 2017 [1A], 2018 [1A]
- Varsity Basketball
- Varsity Cheerleading
- Varsity Football (State Champions: 1978 [1A], 1979 [1A], 1982 [1A], 1986 [1A], 2004 [1A], 2006 [1A], 2007 [1A], 2008 [1A], 2010 [1A]) 2017 [1A],2021 [1A]
- Varsity Softball
- Varsity Volleyball

== Notable alumni ==
- David Beverly, former NFL punter
- Ced Landrum, Former MLB player (Chicago Cubs, New York Mets)
