= Beaver Creek, Alabama =

Unincorporated community in Alabama, United States

- Unincorporated community
- Location within Alabama Location within the United States
- Coordinates: 32°10′16″N 87°52′49″W
- Country: United States
- State: Alabama
- County: Marengo
- Elevation: 190 ft (58 m)
- Time zone: UTC-6 (Central (CST))
  - Summer (DST): UTC-5 (CDT)
- Area code: 334

Beaver Creek is an unincorporated community in Marengo County, Alabama, United States. Its name is derived from the nearby Beaver Creek and the local church, Beaver Creek Baptist Church. Beaver Creek had a school at one time, but it was consolidated into Sweet Water High School in the 1920s.

== Geography ==
Beaver Creek is located at 32.17125°N 87.88028°W and has an elevation of 190 feet (58 m).
