= Exmoor, Alabama =

Unincorporated community in Alabama, United States

- Unincorporated community
- Location within Alabama Location within the United States
- Coordinates: 32°3′23.51″N 87°52′27.01″W
- Country: United States
- State: Alabama
- County: Marengo
- Elevation: 125 ft (38 m)
- Time zone: UTC-6 (Central (CST))
  - Summer (DST): UTC-5 (CDT)
- Area code: 334

Exmoor is an unincorporated community in Marengo County, Alabama, United States. Exmoor had a school and post office at one time. The school was consolidated into Sweet Water High School in the 1920s.

== Geography ==
Exmoor is located at 32.05653°N 87.87417°W and has an elevation of 125 feet (38 m).
