= Dames Ferry, Georgia =

Unincorporated community in Georgia, U.S.

Coordinates: 33°01′19″N 83°43′30″W

Dames Ferry is an unincorporated community in Monroe County, in the U.S. state of Georgia.

== History ==
A post office called Dames Ferry was established in 1884, and remained in operation until 1958. The community was named after John and George Dame, proprietors of a nearby ferry on the Ocmulgee River. A variant name was "Ebenezer".
