= Wann, Oklahoma =

- Town
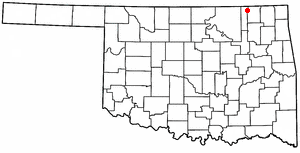
- Location of Wann, Oklahoma
- Coordinates: 36°54′53″N 95°48′17″W
- Country: United States
- State: Oklahoma
- County: Nowata

Area
  - Total: 0.17 sq mi (0.44 km^{2})
  - Land: 0.17 sq mi (0.44 km^{2})
  - Water: 0 sq mi (0.00 km^{2})
- Elevation: 853 ft (260 m)

Population (2020)
  - Total: 95
  - Density: 554.4/sq mi (214.05/km^{2})
- Time zone: UTC-6 (Central (CST))
  - Summer (DST): UTC-5 (CDT)
- ZIP code: 74083
- Area codes: 539/918
- FIPS code: 40-78250
- GNIS feature ID: 2413447

Wann is a town in Nowata County, Oklahoma, United States. As of the 2020 census, Wann had a population of 95. Wann is known for the "Six Flag Poles Over Wann America".

== History ==
The town of Wann has connections to both Cherokee and Eastern Delaware origins. The town and a nearby creek were originally named Coon, after a Delaware family, when the first post office opened July 26, 1895. The town was renamed Wann on October 13, 1899, to honor a local Cherokee, Robert F. Wann. The town was a station on the stage route between Coffeyville, Kansas and Bartlesville, Indian Territory. When the Katy Railroad built its track northwest of town in 1902, the townspeople relocated to be nearer the Wann railroad station.

Wann had 201 inhabitants at Oklahoma's first census in 1907. Oil was discovered in the Wann Oil Pool about this time, leading the population to grow to 286 in 1910 and 404 in 1920. The boom collapsed and so did the population.

The railroad track was abandoned in the 1980s, following the demise of the Katy Railroad. Wann's economy now depends on local farming and ranching.

== Geography ==
According to the United States Census Bureau, the town has a total area of 0.2 square miles (0.52 km^{2}), all land.

== Demographics ==
Historical population
Census	Pop.	Note	%±
1910	286		—
1920	404		41.3%
1930	168		−58.4%
1940	147		−12.5%
1950	99		−32.7%
1960	157		58.6%
1970	135		−14.0%
1980	156		15.6%
1990	126		−19.2%
2000	132		4.8%
2010	125		−5.3%
2020	95		−24.0%
U.S. Decennial Census

=== 2020 census ===
As of the 2020 census, Wann had a population of 95. The median age was 42.5 years. 14.7% of residents were under the age of 18 and 29.5% of residents were 65 years of age or older. For every 100 females there were 115.9 males, and for every 100 females age 18 and over there were 92.9 males age 18 and over.

0.0% of residents lived in urban areas, while 100.0% lived in rural areas.

There were 39 households in Wann, of which 25.6% had children under the age of 18 living in them. Of all households, 51.3% were married-couple households, 28.2% were households with a male householder and no spouse or partner present, and 12.8% were households with a female householder and no spouse or partner present. About 18.0% of all households were made up of individuals and 12.8% had someone living alone who was 65 years of age or older.

There were 48 housing units, of which 18.8% were vacant. The homeowner vacancy rate was 0.0% and the rental vacancy rate was 50.0%.

Racial composition as of the 2020 census
Race	Number	Percent
White	75	78.9%
Black or African American	1	1.1%
American Indian and Alaska Native	7	7.4%
Asian	0	0.0%
Native Hawaiian and Other Pacific Islander	0	0.0%
Some other race	0	0.0%
Two or more races	12	12.6%
Hispanic or Latino (of any race)	5	5.3%

=== 2000 census ===
As of the census of 2000, there were 132 people, 50 households, and 35 families residing in the town. The population density was 758.6 inhabitants per square mile (292.9/km^{2}). There were 59 housing units at an average density of 339.1 per square mile (130.9/km^{2}). The racial makeup of the town was 68.18% White, 21.21% Native American, and 10.61% from two or more races. Hispanic or Latino of any race were 7.58% of the population.

There were 50 households, out of which 36.0% had children under the age of 18 living with them, 60.0% were married couples living together, 8.0% had a female householder with no husband present, and 30.0% were non-families. 30.0% of all households were made up of individuals, and 10.0% had someone living alone who was 65 years of age or older. The average household size was 2.64 and the average family size was 3.09.

In the town, the population was spread out, with 34.1% under the age of 18, 5.3% from 18 to 24, 25.0% from 25 to 44, 24.2% from 45 to 64, and 11.4% who were 65 years of age or older. The median age was 35 years. For every 100 females, there were 94.1 males. For every 100 females age 18 and over, there were 107.1 males.

The median income for a household in the town was $27,917, and the median income for a family was $33,750. Males had a median income of $26,250 versus $21,250 for females. The per capita income for the town was $13,512. There were 9.7% of families and 9.3% of the population living below the poverty line, including no under eighteens and 15.0% of those over 64.
