= Dixons Mills, Alabama =

Unincorporated community in Alabama, United States

- Unincorporated community
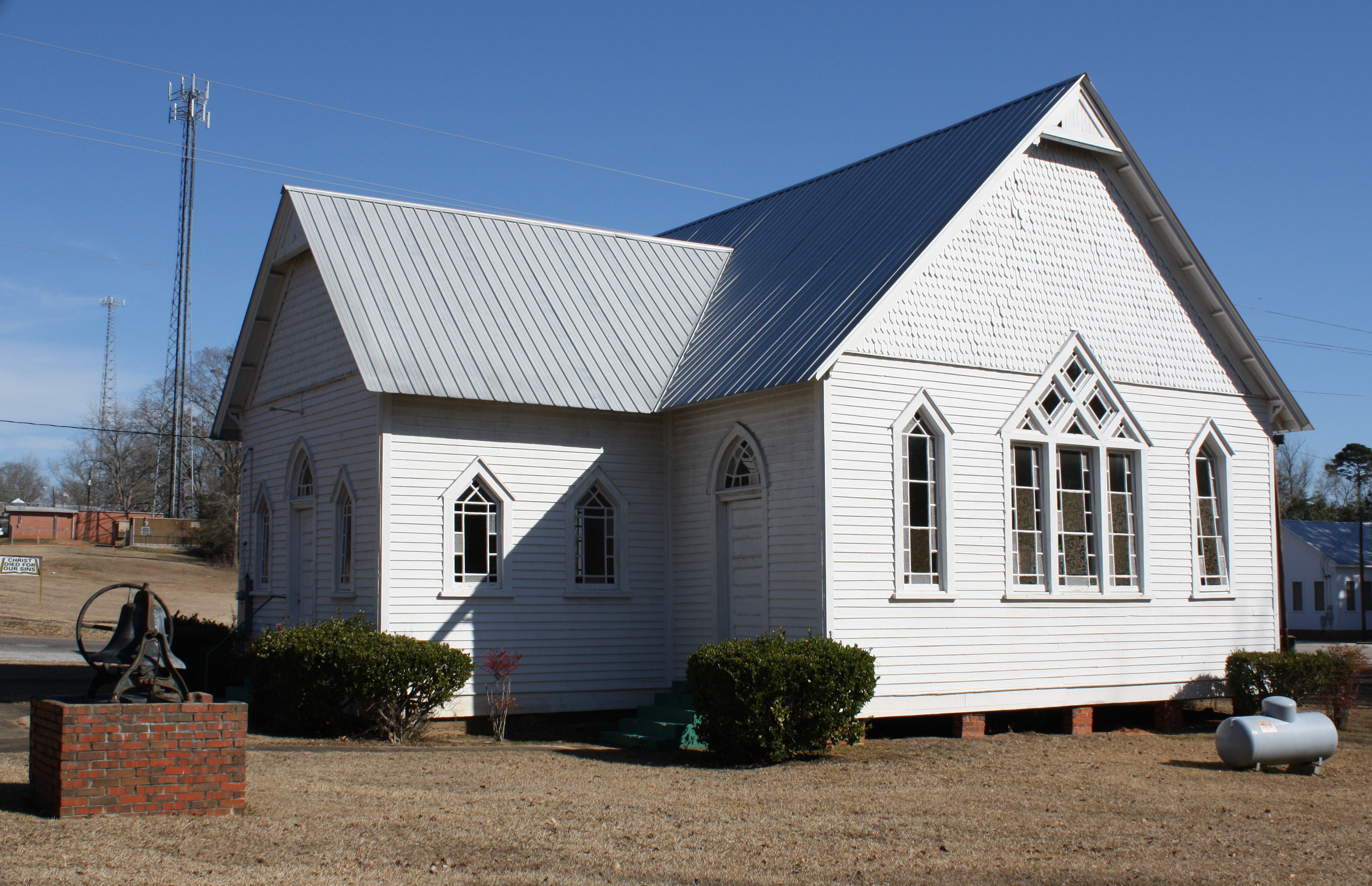
- Dixons Mills Methodist Church

- Location within Alabama Location within the United States
- Coordinates: 32°3′29.02″N 87°47′15″W
- Country: United States
- State: Alabama
- County: Marengo
- Elevation: 207 ft (63 m)
- Time zone: UTC-6 (Central (CST))
  - Summer (DST): UTC-5 (CDT)
- ZIP code: 36736
- Area code: 334

Dixons Mills is an unincorporated community in Marengo County, Alabama, United States. The community was named for a group of mills operated by Joel B. Dixon in the 19th century. Dixons Mills has a post office utilizing the 36736 ZIP code.

== Demographics ==
Historical population
Census	Pop.	Note	%±
1870	120		—
U.S. Decennial Census

Dixon Mills appeared on the 1870 U.S. Census, having 120 residents. Of that 120, 80 were black and 40 were white. This was the only time the community appeared on census rolls.

== History ==
Beginning in the late 1820s, Joel B. Dixon, Sr. operated a water-powered gristmill at a dam that he and his sons built on Mill Creek along the old Linden-to-Choctaw Corner Road. The modern U.S. Route 43 bridge over Mill Creek now stands at the location. Dixon (January 11, 1777 – December 23, 1861), a native of Edgecombe County, North Carolina, was one of the early settlers of Marengo County. His business grew and eventually included a steam engine-driven sawmill and two steam-powered cotton gins. The mills remained in use into the first years of the 20th century. They were still standing in 1923, when they were demolished during the construction of Route 43.

== Geography ==
Dixons Mills is located at 32.05806°N 87.78750°W and has an elevation of 207 feet (63 m).

== School ==
Dixons Mills' only school is Marengo High School. It is part of the Marengo County School District.
