= Sweet Water, Alabama =

- Town
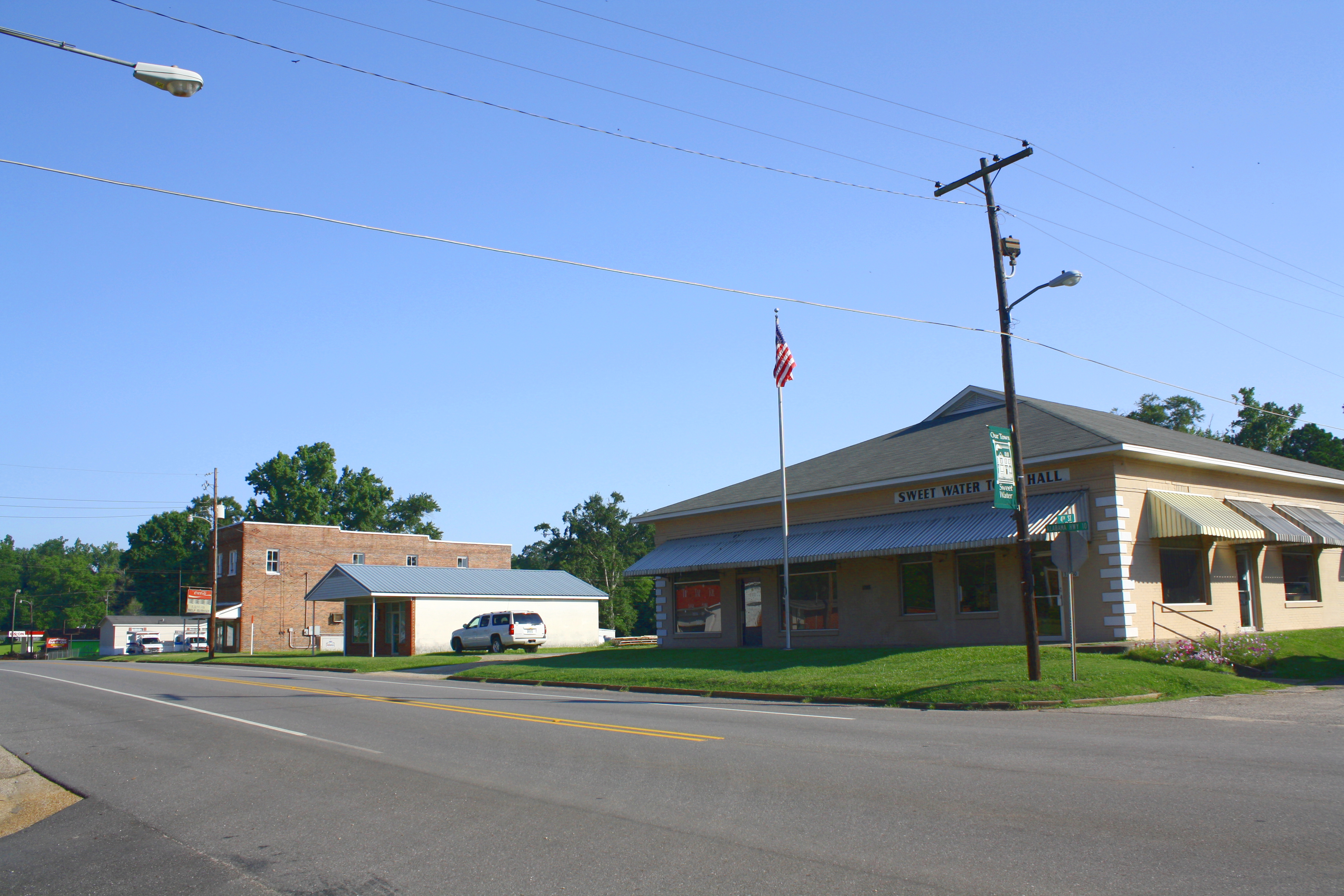
- Downtown Sweet Water

- Location in Marengo County, Alabama
- Coordinates: 32°06′17″N 87°51′43″W
- Country: United States
- State: Alabama
- County: Marengo

Government
  - Type: Mayor-Council

Area
  - Total: 2.35 sq mi (6.1 km^{2})
  - Land: 2.35 sq mi (6.1 km^{2})
  - Water: 0.00 sq mi (0 km^{2})
- Elevation: 200 ft (61 m)

Population (2020)
  - Total: 228
  - Density: 96.9/sq mi (37.4/km^{2})
- Time zone: UTC-6 (Central (CST))
  - Summer (DST): UTC-5 (CDT)
- ZIP code: 36782
- Area code: 334
- FIPS code: 01-74304
- GNIS feature ID: 2406702
- Website: sweetwateral.gov

Sweet Water is a town in Marengo County, Alabama, United States. It was founded during the 1840s and named for Sweet Water Creek, which runs through a section of the community. The population was 228 at the 2020 census, down from 258 at the 2010 census.

== Geography ==
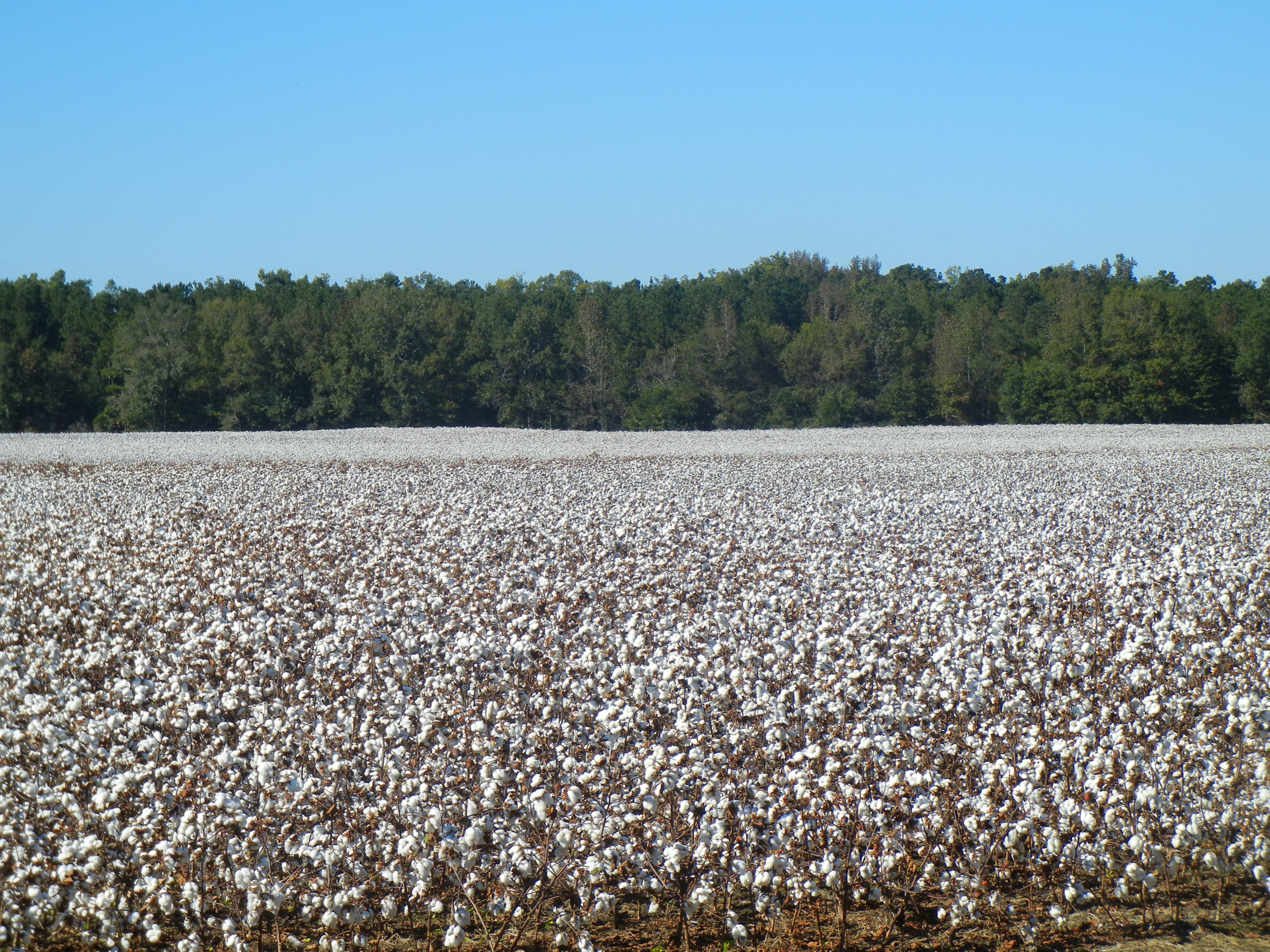
Panoramic view of one of many cotton fields surrounding the town and nearby areas

Sweet Water is located in southern Marengo County and has an elevation of 184 feet (56 m). It is 20 miles (32 km) by road south of Linden, the county seat. Alabama State Route 10 passes through the town, leading southeast 20 miles (32 km) to Pine Hill and west 22 miles (35 km) to Butler.

According to the U.S. Census Bureau, the town of Sweet Water has a total area of 2.4 square miles (6.2 km^{2}), all of it recorded as land. Sweet Water Creek forms the southern border of the town and flows southwest to Horse Creek, a west-flowing tributary of the Tombigbee River.

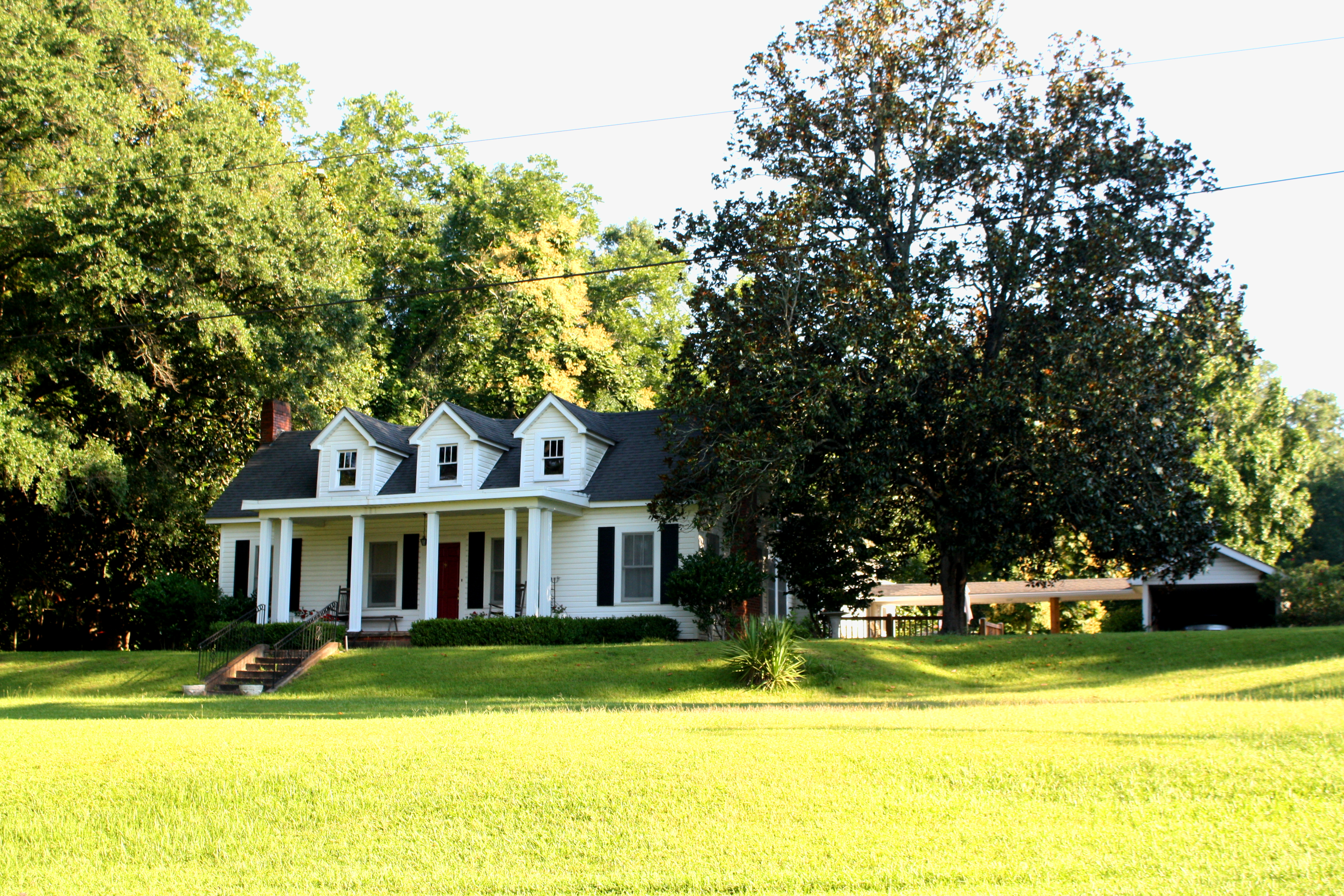
Colonial Revival-style house on Main Street

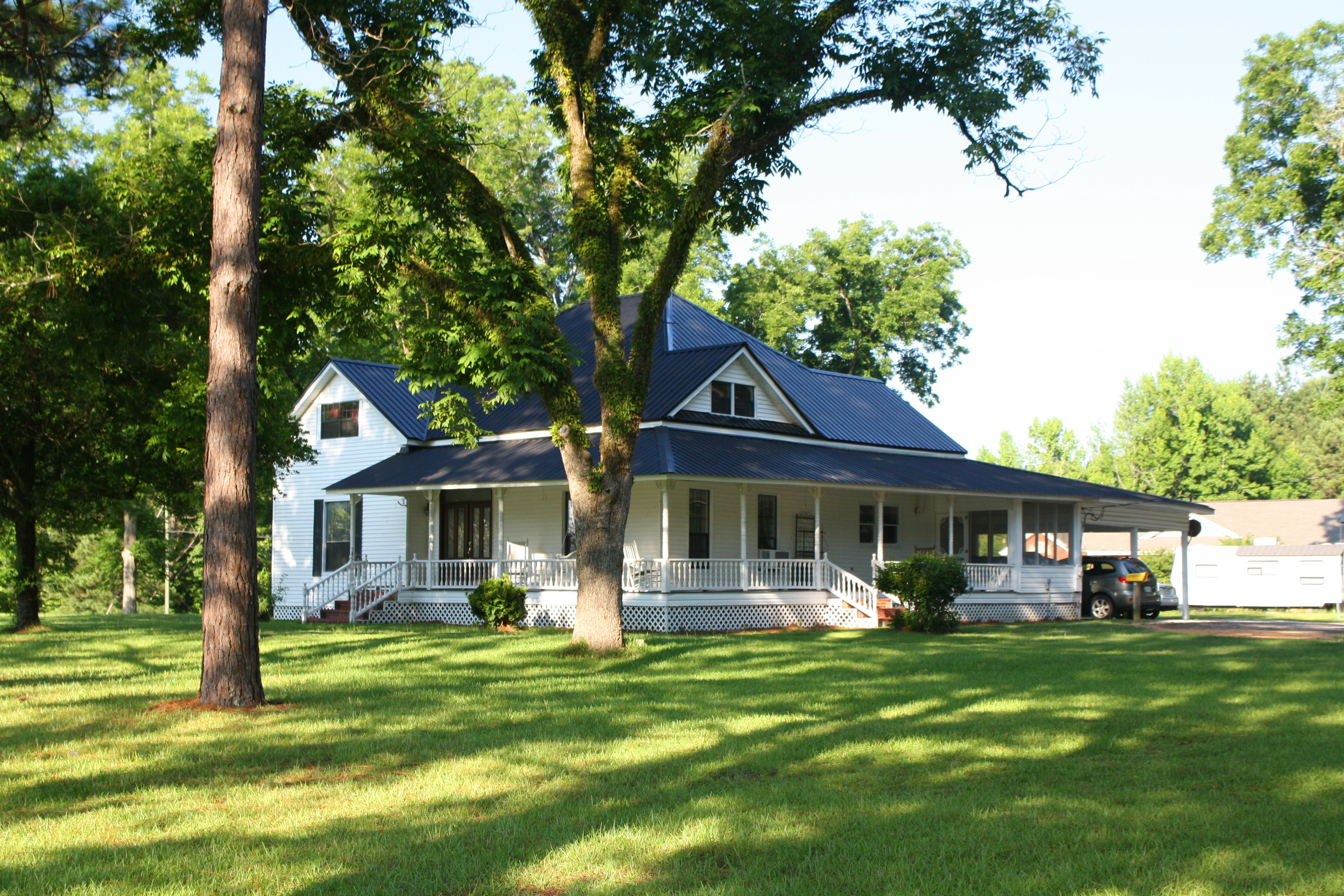
The Lewis-Sheffield House (1910) on Main Street

== Education ==
The town is home to Sweet Water High School, part of the Marengo County School District. The current school was founded during the early 1870s.

== Demographics ==
Historical population
Census	Pop.	Note	%±
1970	265		—
1980	253		−4.5%
1990	243		−4.0%
2000	234		−3.7%
2010	258		10.3%
2020	228		−11.6%
U.S. Decennial Census; 2013 Estimate

=== Racial and ethnic composition ===
Sweet Water town, Alabama – Racial and ethnic composition Note: the US Census treats Hispanic/Latino as an ethnic category. This table excludes Latinos from the racial categories and assigns them to a separate category. Hispanics/Latinos may be of any race.
Race / Ethnicity (NH = Non-Hispanic)	Pop 2000	Pop 2010	Pop 2020	% 2000	% 2010	% 2020
White alone (NH)	216	235	203	92.31%	91.09%	89.04%
Black or African American alone (NH)	13	20	9	5.56%	7.75%	3.95%
Native American or Alaska Native alone (NH)	4	0	0	1.71%	0.00%	0.00%
Asian alone (NH)	0	0	0	0.00%	0.00%	0.00%
Native Hawaiian or Pacific Islander alone (NH)	0	0	0	0.00%	0.00%	0.00%
Other race alone (NH)	0	0	1	0.00%	0.00%	0.44%
Mixed race or Multiracial (NH)	1	0	14	0.43%	0.00%	6.14%
Hispanic or Latino (any race)	0	3	1	0.00%	1.16%	0.44%
Total	234	258	228	100.00%	100.00%	100.00%

=== 2010 census ===
As of the census of 2010, there were 258 people, 94 households, and 72 families residing in the town. There were 111 housing units, of which 94 were occupied. The racial makeup of the town was 91.1% White, 7.8% Black or African American, and 1.2% from some other races. 1.2% of the population were Hispanic or Latino of any race.

There were 94 households, out of which 31.9% had children under the age of 18 living with them, 66.0% were married couples living together, 7.4% had a female householder with no husband present, 3.2% had a male householder with no wife present, and 23.4% were non-families. 22.3% of all households were made up of individuals, and 14.9% had someone living alone who was 65 years of age or older. The average household size was 2.74 and the average family size was 3.22.

The population was spread out, with 70.9% 18 years and over, 68.2% 21 years and over, 20.5% 62 years and over, and 19.4% who were 65 years and over. The median age was 39 years.

== Transportation ==
Alabama State Route 10

== Notable people ==
- David Beverly, former American football punter for the Houston Oilers and Green Bay Packers
- Bob Harrington, evangelist known as the "Chaplain of Bourbon Street"
- Ced Landrum, former outfielder for the Chicago Cubs and New York Mets.
