= List of covered bridges in Alabama =

Below is a present list of Alabama covered bridges. There are currently eleven historic covered bridges remaining in the U.S. state of Alabama. Of those, six remain at their original locations.

The comparison between authentic and non-authentic covered bridges are by how they are constructed. Covered bridges made with stringers instead of traditional style trusses are considered non-authentic, although in some terms, a stringer construction is also a type of truss. Examples of truss construction on covered bridges include Howe, Town Lattice, Queen-post, King-post, Haupt, Burr, Brown and Pratt. Of the existing historic covered bridges in Alabama, the Gilliland-Reese Covered Bridge and the Old Union Crossing Covered Bridge are classified as non-authentic based on their current construction.

Name	Image	County	Location	Built	Length (ft)	Spans	Notes
Alamuchee-Bellamy		Sumter	Livingston	1861	88	Duck Pond	Moved to the University of West Alabama campus in 1971.
Clarkson-Legg		Cullman	Bethel	1904	270	Crooked Creek	Currently the second longest historic covered bridge in Alabama and third longest overall in the state. Listed on the National Register of Historic Places.
Coldwater		Calhoun	Oxford	ca. 1850	63	outlet of Oxford Lake	Moved to Oxford Lake Park in 1990. Currently the oldest covered bridge in Alabama. Listed on the National Register of Historic Places.
Easley		Blount	Rosa	1927	95	Dub Branch -- Calvert Prong of the Little Warrior River	Oldest of three covered bridges remaining in Blount County. Bridge open to motor vehicle traffic. Listed on the National Register of Historic Places.
Gilliland-Reese		Etowah	Gadsden	1899	85	Small Pond near Black Creek	Moved to Noccalula Falls Park in 1967.
Horton Mill		Blount	Oneonta	1934	220	Calvert Prong of the Little Warrior River	Highest covered bridge above any United States waterway. Listed on the National Register of Historic Places.
Kymulga		Talladega	Childersburg	1861	105	Talladega Creek	Located in Kymulga Park. Both the bridge and gristmill were restored in 1974. Listed on the National Register of Historic Places.
Old Union Crossing		DeKalb	Mentone	ca. 1863	90	West Fork of the Little River	Built in Calhoun County. Moved to its current location in 1972 (private). Rebuilt in 1980.
Salem-Shotwell		Lee	Opelika	1900	43	Rocky Brook	Originally 76 feet. Destroyed on June 4, 2005 by a fallen tree. Rebuilt at Opelika Municipal Park.
Swann		Blount	Cleveland	1933	324	Locust Fork of the Black Warrior River	Currently the longest historic covered bridge in Alabama and second longest overall in the state. Bridge open to motor vehicle traffic. Listed on the National Register of Historic Places.
Waldo		Talladega	Waldo	1858	115	Talladega Creek	Located behind the old Riddle Mill, now named the Old Mill Restaurant (private).

These modern covered bridges shown below either have or will soon have historic eligibility. According to the National Register of Historic Places, a structure needs to be at least fifty years old to be considered historic although there are other criteria as part of the evaluation to be listed such as integrity and significance. All are classified as non-authentic covered bridges with most of them being privately owned.

Name	Image	County	Location	Built	Length (ft)	Spans	Notes
Askew		Lee	Auburn	1968	24	private stream	Bridge is located at a private residence.
Cambron		Madison	Huntsville	1974	90	Cove of Sky Lake	Bridge is located atop Green Mountain at Madison County Nature Trail Park.
Fosters		Houston	Dothan	1972	24	Outlet to Lochenglen Lake	Bridge is located at a private residence.
Gargus		Etowah	Gallant	1966	22	Gargus Bass Lake	Bridge is located at a private residence.
Mountain Oaks		Jefferson	Hoover	1970	26	Huckleberry Creek	Bridge is located in a residential area of Hoover and is currently open to motor vehicle traffic.
Tannehill Valley Estates		Jefferson	McCalla	1972	42	Mill Creek	Bridge is located at Tannehill Ironworks Historical State Park near the John Wesley Hall Grist Mill.

Below is a list of some historic covered bridges in Alabama which were eventually destroyed, removed or altered.

Name	County	Location	Built	Length (ft)	Spans	Notes
Bangor	Blount	Bangor	N/A	N/A	Mulberry Fork of the Black Warrior River	Bridge no longer extant.
Big Bear Creek	Colbert	Allsboro	mid-19th Century	N/A	Big Bear Creek	Bridge no longer extant.
Blount Springs	Blount	Blount Springs	1931	N/A	Murphy Creek	Bridge no longer extant.
Bolte	Cullman	Bolte	N/A	N/A	Brindley Creek	Bridge was destroyed by a tornado on March 21, 1932.
Brookwood	Tuscaloosa	Brookwood	ca. 1850	177	Hurricane Creek	Bridge burned down in 1965.
Butler Mill	Madison	New Hope	1884	165	Paint Rock River	Bridge was replaced in the late 1940s.
Buzzard Roost	Colbert	Cherokee	ca. 1820	94	Buzzard Roost Creek	One of the first covered bridges in Alabama. Bridge burned down on July 15, 1972.
Cane Creek	Calhoun	Ohatchee	1886	N/A	Cane Creek	Bridge was destroyed by a flood in early 1936.
Chamblee Mill	Blount	Blountsville	N/A	97	Blue Springs Creek	Bridge no longer extant.
Chattahoochee River	Barbour	Eufaula	1833	540	Chattahoochee River	One of the longest covered bridges constructed in Alabama. Demolished in 1924.
Chosea Springs	Calhoun	Choccolocco	N/A	98	Choccolocco Creek	Bridge was demolished in 1963.
Cofer	Cullman	Trimble	N/A	239	Ryan Creek	Bridge was dismantled around 1934.
Cowikee Creek	Barbour	Eufaula	N/A	N/A	Cowikee Creek	Bridge was demolished in 1913.
Cripple Deer Creek	Colbert	Allsboro	ca. 1859	N/A	Cripple Deer Creek	Bridge no longer extant.
Crooked Shoals	Blount	Nectar	1931	N/A	Locust Fork of the Black Warrior River	Bridge burned down in 1954.
Dean's Ferry	Blount	County Line	1930	N/A	Locust Fork of the Black Warrior River	Bridge no longer extant.
Dillingham Street	Russell	Phenix City	1832	400	Chattahoochee River	Bridge was destroyed during the Civil War Battle of Girard in 1865.
Duck Branch	Blount	N/A	1930	N/A	N/A	Bridge no longer extant.
Duck Springs	Etowah	Duck Springs	1879	119	Big Wills Creek	Unique structural design. Bridge burned down on July 7, 1972.
Five Points	Blount	Blountsville	N/A	N/A	Locust Fork of the Black Warrior River	Bridge was destroyed by a flood.
Gable	Blount	Blountsville	N/A	240	Mulberry Fork of the Black Warrior River	Bridge no longer extant.
Garden City	Cullman	Garden City	1891	280	Mulberry Fork of the Black Warrior River	Bridge burned down on October 12, 1951.
Gay	Cullman	Pleasant Grove	1898	123	Eight Mile Creek	Bridge was dismantled in 1963.
Golden's Mill	Tallapoosa	East Tallasee	N/A	N/A	Sougahatchee Creek	Bridge no longer extant.
Hillabee Creek	Calhoun	Hicks	N/A	N/A	Hillabee Creek	Bridge was destroyed by a flood in early 1964.
Hillabee Creek	Tallapoosa	Alexander City	N/A	N/A	Hillabee Creek	Bridge no longer extant.
Inland	Blount	Remlap	1930	N/A	Blackburn Fork of the Little Warrior River	Consisted of two covered bridges crossing a river bend. The road was eventually rerouted sometime around 1960 and the bridges were no longer needed.
Joy Road	Blount	Blountsville	N/A	121	Austin Creek	Bridge was demolished.
Kilpatrick	Cullman	West Point	N/A	N/A	N/A	Bridge burned down on October 3, 1937.
Lidy Walker	Cullman	Berlin	1926	50	Outlet to Lidy's Lake	Built in Blount County. Moved to Lidy's Lake in 1958 (private). Collapsed in August 2001.
Lincoln	Talladega	Lincoln	1903	160	Choccolocco Creek	Bridge burned down on July 15, 1963.
Loachapoka	Lee	Loachapoka	N/A	N/A	Sougahatchee Creek	Bridge was destroyed by a flood around 1919.
Locust Fork	Blount	Locust Fork	1927	N/A	Little Warrior River	Bridge was replaced in 1953.
Mardis Mill	Blount	Blountsville	N/A	N/A	Graves Creek	Bridge no longer extant.
Meadows Mill	Lee	Beulah	1902	140	Halawakee Creek	Located near Meadows Mill, a historic gristmill. Bridge burned down on October 4, 1973.
Mellon	Calhoun	DeArmanville	late-19th Century	100	Choccolocco Creek	Bridge burned down on October 3, 1970.
Miller	Tallapoosa	New Site	1887	600	Tallapoosa River	Once the longest covered bridge in the United States. Bridge destroyed during a flood in July 1963.
Mulberry	Cullman	Hanceville	N/A	220	Mulberry Fork of the Black Warrior River	Bridge no longer extant.
Nectar	Blount	Nectar	1934	385	Locust Fork of the Black Warrior River	Once the seventh longest covered bridge in the country. Bridge burned down on June 13, 1993.
Norman	Montgomery	Montgomery	N/A	N/A	Catoma Creek	Bridge no longer extant.
Oakachoy	Coosa	Nixburg	1916	56	Oakachoy Creek	Old wagon ruts located near site. Bridge burned down on June 2, 2001.
Old Tin Sides	Talladega	Childersburg	N/A	N/A	Tallaseehatchee Creek	Bridge no longer extant.
Phillips	Etowah	Duck Springs	ca. 1823	N/A	Big Wills Creek	Bridge no longer extant.
Pintlala Creek	Montgomery	Hope Hull	1861	114	Pintlala Creek	Bridge demolished in the mid-20th Century.
Putman	Cullman	Hanceville	N/A	474	Mulberry Fork of the Black Warrior River	One of the longest covered bridges constructed in Alabama. Bridge no longer extant.
Rockhole	Blount	Summit	N/A	121	Mulberry Fork of the Black Warrior River	Bridge no longer extant.
Sanford	Cullman	Bremen	N/A	152	Ryan Creek	Bridge no longer extant.
Slab Creek	Blount	McLarty	1933	N/A	Slab Creek	Bridge was destroyed by a flood on February 3, 1936.
Snead	Blount	Snead	N/A	46	Big Mud Creek	Bridge no longer extant.
Standridge	Blount	Hayden	1934	432	Locust Fork of the Black Warrior River	Bridge burned down on November 18, 1967.
Tallahatchee	Calhoun	Piedmont	ca. 1900	61	Pond near Nances Creek	Moved to Piedmont from nearby Wellington in 1975 (private). Bridge may be still in private use although there are currently no reports of its continued existence.
Tanner	Cullman	Baileyton	N/A	257	Duck Creek	Bridge no longer extant.
Trimble	Cullman	Trimble	N/A	151	Ryan Creek	Bridge no longer extant.
Tyre Green	Blount	Locust Fork	1933	127	Little Warrior River	Bridge no longer extant.
Vaughn	Blount	Hayden	1934	N/A	Locust Fork of the Black Warrior River	Bridge no longer extant.
Ward's Mill	Blount	Susan Moore	N/A	N/A	Locust Fork of the Black Warrior River	Bridge no longer extant.
Wasden Road	Montgomery	Hope Hull	1851	82	Pintlala Creek	Bridge collapsed in 1965.
Welti Road	Cullman	Welti	ca. 1904	100	Eight Mile Creek	Bridge burned down on October 22, 1939.
Wetumpka	Elmore	Wetumpka	1844	N/A	Coosa River	Bridge was destroyed by a major flood in 1886.
Whaley Mill	Cullman	Hanceville	N/A	52	Whaley Mill Creek	Bridge was replaced in 1963.
Woods	Lee	Auburn	N/A	100	Sougahatchee Creek	Bridge collapsed on April 21, 1959.
Wool Mill	Autauga	Prattville	N/A	N/A	Autauga Creek	Bridge collapsed in 1916.

NOTE: Tallaseehatchee Creek and Tallasseehatchee Creek are two different waterways. One is located in Talladega County, while the other is in Calhoun County (also called Tallahatchee Creek).
