= List of bridges on the National Register of Historic Places in Alabama =

This is a list of bridges and tunnels on the National Register of Historic Places in the U.S. state of Alabama.

Name	Image	Built	Listed	Location	County	Type
Clarkson–Legg Covered Bridge		1904	1974-06-25	Cullman; 34°12′27″N 86°59′28″W	Cullman	Two-span Town truss
Coldwater Covered Bridge		ca. 1845	1973-04-11	Coldwater; 33°35′10″N 85°54′47″W	Calhoun	Covered kingpost truss
Easley Covered Bridge		ca. 1927	1981-08-20	Oneonta; 33°58′15″N 86°31′6″W	Blount	Covered Town truss
Five Mile Creek Bridge		ca. 1911	1973-02-28	McCalla; 33°21′7″N 87°1′19″W	Jefferson	
Half Chance Iron Bridge	Half-Chance Bridge	ca. 1880	1972-09-14	Dayton; 32°18′39″N 87°41′59″W	Marengo	Bowstring truss
Horton Mill Covered Bridge		1934, 1935	1970-12-29	Oneonta; 34°0′58″N 86°26′55″W	Blount	Covered Town truss
Kymulga Mill & Covered Bridge		ca. 1860, ca. 1864	1976-10-29	Childersburg; 33°20′3″N 86°18′1″W	Talladega	Covered
Memphis & Charleston Railroad Bridge		1893	2024-05-30	Sheffield; 34°46′51.6″N 87°40′04.8″W	Colbert	Warren truss, Lift (relocated 1990)
Nectar Covered Bridge	Nectar Covered Bridge Piers	1934	1981-08-20	Nectar; 33°57′22″N 86°37′34″W	Blount	Covered Town truss
Oakachoy Covered Bridge		1915	removed 2001-09-23	Nixburg	Coosa	Covered queen post truss
Edmund Pettus Bridge		1940	2013-03-11	Selma; 32.4056°N 87.0186°W	Dallas	Steel through arch bridge
Swann Covered Bridge		1933	1981-08-20	Cleveland; 33°59′50″N 86°36′6″W	Blount	Covered Town truss

== See also ==
- List of bridges in Alabama
