= Tallahatchee Covered Bridge =

Tallahatchee CB
- Coordinates: 33°53′16.13″N 85°37′33.70″W
- Carries: pedestrian traffic
- Crosses: Nances Creek
- Locale: Piedmont, Alabama
- Maintained by: PRIVATE USE
- ID number: 01-08-03 (WGCB)

Characteristics
- Design: Multiple King-post truss with Town Lattice combination
- Total length: 61 ft (19 m)

History
- Construction end: ca. 1900
- Closed: Current status unknown.

Location
- Interactive map of Tallahatchee CB

The Tallahatchee Covered Bridge (sometimes spelled 'Tallasseehatchee'), also known as the Prickett Covered Bridge, was a privately owned wood and metal combination style covered bridge which spanned a pond near Nances Creek in Calhoun County, Alabama, United States. It was located just off State Route 9, about 2 miles (3 kilometers) south of the city of Piedmont. Approximate coordinates were 33°53′16.13″N 85°37′33.70″W (33.887824, -85.626027).

Built around 1900 (although some sources say it was built in the 1908), the 61-foot (19-meter) covered bridge was a rare construction of Multiple King-post truss with Town Lattice over a single span. The Coldwater Covered Bridge, also located in Calhoun County, has a similar build. Its WGCB number is 01-08-03. The bridge was originally located near Wellington, Alabama and moved to its current location in 1975. Unfortunately, no additional information regarding the Tallahatchee Covered Bridge is mentioned since that period. It was shown on a list of covered bridges published by the Alabama Historical Commission in either the late 1970s or early 1980s. No date was on the document. There is a possibility that the bridge may still be in private use today although no specifics are currently available. It was originally maintained by the Calhoun County Commission.

== History ==
The Tallahatchee Covered Bridge was built over Tallasseehatchee Creek (also called Tallahatchee Creek) by county bridge builder Jim P. Nunnally, with the help of Mose A. Prickett, on what is now Old Sulphur Springs Road southeast of Wellington (Coordinates 33°48′57.48″N 85°52′23.54″W (33.815959, -85.873202))...a couple miles off U.S. Route 431. This was about 23 miles (37 kilometers) southwest of the current location. Concrete piers were added to support the bridge in 1908. The covered bridge was open to motor vehicle traffic, primarily for local farm use, until a modern low hip steel bridge bypassed it in 1954. Having high tourist potential due to its unique construction, the Tallahatchee Covered Bridge was semi-preserved by the Calhoun County Commission although it had slowly decayed over the years due to its remote location and lack of public concern. A deed offer was made to both the Alabama Historical Commission and the Calhoun County Historical Society, but it wasn't until 20 years later when the bridge once again had significant interest. Brothers Larry K. Martin and Stanley M. Martin, formerly of Anniston, Alabama, purchased the bridge for their Nances Creek Restoration Project just south of Piedmont on an 80-acre tract along Choccolocco Mountain. The bridge would eventually span a pond near the creek once completed. Preparations were made for transportation in late November 1974, but inclement weather delayed the venture until the following year. In early September 1975, the Tallahatchee Covered Bridge was moved by tractor trailer from Wellington to Piedmont and placed in a pasture near Nances Creek to become part of a reconstructed pioneer village and Appalachian crafts center. The Martin brothers had already begun preserving other historic items within the South prior to this acquisition as part of their settlement. It has been made clear though that the Nances Creek Restoration Project could take a number of years to be fully completed.

Currently, no information about the Tallahatchee Covered Bridge after the move or of its continued existence is mentioned. The property location is privately owned and should be respected.

Photos of the Tallahatchee Covered Bridge can be found on ADAH Digital Collections (linked below).

The Old Union Crossing Covered Bridge near Mentone, Alabama has also been called the Tallahatchee Covered Bridge, but this is actually a different bridge. An older landmark originally located near Lincoln, Alabama, it was moved to Lookout Mountain in 1972.

== See also ==
- List of Alabama covered bridges
