= Lidy Walker Covered Bridge =

Lidy Walker CB
- Coordinates: 34°11′6.46″N 86°44′15.35″W
- Carries: Pedestrian traffic
- Crosses: Outlet to Lidy's Lake
- Locale: Berlin, Alabama
- Maintained by: PRIVATE USE
- ID number: 01-22-12 (WGCB)

Characteristics
- Design: Town Lattice truss
- Total length: 50 ft (15 m)

History
- Construction end: 1926
- Closed: August 2001 by collapse

The Lidy Walker Covered Bridge, formerly known as the Big Branch Covered Bridge, was a privately owned wood-&-metal combination style covered bridge which spanned the outlet to Lidy's Lake in Cullman County, Alabama, United States. It was located in the Berlin community at a pasture near the lake off Cullman County Road 1616 near U.S. Route 278, 6 miles (10 kilometers) east of the city of Cullman.

Built in 1926, the 50-foot (15-meter) bridge was a Town Lattice truss construction over a single span. Its WGCB number is 01-22-12, originally given 01-05-14 as the Big Branch Covered Bridge. The covered bridge was originally located in Blount County near Blountsville and moved to its current location in 1958. It collapsed in early August 2001, leaving the 270-foot (82-meter) Clarkson-Legg Covered Bridge the only remaining historic covered bridge in Cullman County.

== History ==
The Lidy Walker Covered Bridge was first named the Big Branch Covered Bridge, built in 1926 over Mountain Grove Branch on what is now Blount County Road 47 near the intersection of Hamm Road west of Blountsville 34°4′42.44″N 86°39′29.75″W. This was about 13 miles (21 kilometers) southeast of the current location. The bridge was open to motor vehicle traffic until 1958 when a new road bypassed it. Later that year, Berlin resident and local contractor Winford I. "Lidy" Walker purchased the Big Branch Covered Bridge for $50.00 and moved it to his farm at Lidy's Lake in Cullman County which later became a recreation area. The covered bridge soon was renamed 'Lidy Walker' after him. Visitors were able to view the historic bridge on his property until it collapsed in 2001. Walker died at his home in 2012 at age 89.

== See also ==
- List of Alabama covered bridges
