= Alamuchee-Bellamy Covered Bridge =

Alamuchee-Bellamy CB
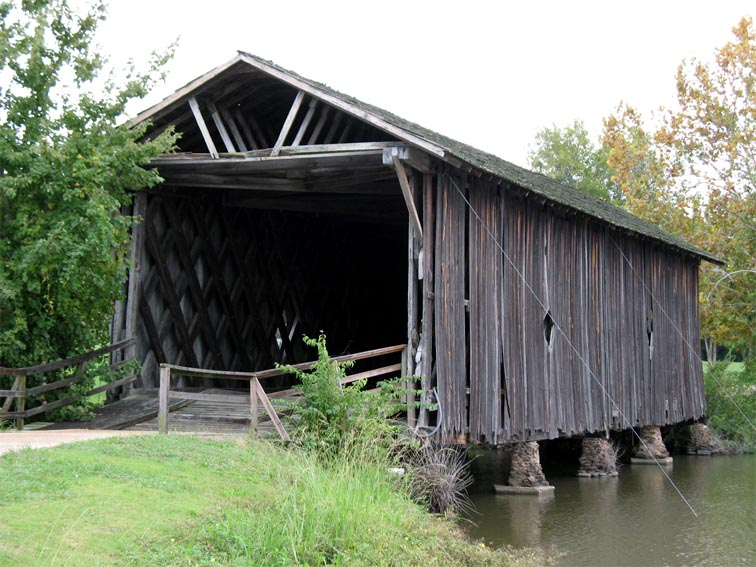
- The Alamuchee-Bellamy Covered Bridge (1861) moved to the campus of the University of West Alabama in Livingston, Alabama
- Coordinates: 32.59374°N 88.18585°W
- Carries: pedestrian traffic
- Crosses: Duck Pond (UWA)
- Locale: Livingston, Alabama
- Maintained by: Sumter County Historical Society
- ID number: 01-60-01 (WGCB)

Characteristics
- Design: Town lattice truss
- Total length: 88 ft (27 m)

History
- Construction end: 1861

Location
- Interactive map of Alamuchee-Bellamy CB

The Alamuchee-Bellamy Covered Bridge is a county-owned wooden covered bridge that spans the northeast corner of Duck Pond in Sumter County, Alabama, United States. It is located on the campus of the University of West Alabama behind Reed Hall, which is off Student Union Drive in the city of Livingston.

Built in 1861, the 88-foot (27-meter) bridge is a Town's lattice truss construction over a single span. Its World Guide to Covered Bridges number is 01-60-01. The Alamuchee-Bellamy Covered Bridge is currently eligible for addition to the National Register of Historic Places. It is one of the oldest covered bridges still existing in Alabama; it is maintained by the Sumter County Historical Society.

== History ==
The bridge was originally designed and constructed over the Sucarnoochee River by Confederate Army Captain William Alexander Campbell Jones on the main state road leading from Livingston to York, now U.S. Route 11 just south of Livingston. It was built using hand-hewn yellow pine timbers joined together with large wooden pegs. During the American Civil War, the bridge was used as an access route to Mississippi by Confederate forces led by General Nathan Bedford Forrest.

A concrete bridge replaced the Alamuchee-Bellamy Covered Bridge in 1924, and it was moved 5 miles (8 km) south to the old Bellamy-Livingston Road (now Bennett 13 Road, CR 13) over Alamuchee Creek (coordinates 32°31′19.75″N 88°11′12.22″W, or 32.522153, -88.186728), soon given the name "Alamuchee Covered Bridge". The bridge remained in service to motor traffic until 1958, when it was once again replaced by a concrete bridge. During that time, a logging truck being used to haul timbers from the construction site accidentally crashed into the bottom of the covered bridge. As a result, the Alamuchee-Bellamy Covered Bridge was permanently closed and left unmaintained.

In 1971, the Sumter County Historical Society came to the rescue and fully restored the damaged bridge. It was moved from Alamuchee Creek back into Livingston and placed over Duck Pond at what is now the University of West Alabama. The bridge now serves as a campus access route for college students and also attracts visitors from various places to a longstanding piece of history in Sumter County. It has been made wheelchair accessible, and also has lights inside the bridge for nighttime illumination.

The covered bridge underwent restoration in early 2017.

== Famous Alabama hanging ==
Stephen S. Renfroe, known as "Alabama's Outlaw Sheriff", was hanged near the Alamuchee-Bellamy Covered Bridge outside Livingston by locals in July 1886. During that time, the bridge was still located over the Sucarnoochee River and not Alamuchee Creek as some sources state.

== See also ==
- List of Alabama covered bridges
- Clarkson–Legg Covered Bridge – bridge in Alabama, also with General Nathan Bedford Forrest
