= Nectar (disambiguation) =

Nectar is the sugar-rich liquid produced by the flowers of plants, in order to attract pollinating animals.

Nectar may also refer to:

== Food ==
- Nectar, originally a name of the food or drink of the gods in Greek mythology; see ambrosia
- Nectar (drink), a fruit juice beverage
- Nectar, an alcoholic beverage

== Places ==
- Nectar, Alabama, a town in central Alabama
- Mare Nectaris, the Sea of Nectar, a geographic feature of the Moon
- Nectar Covered Bridge, a former covered bridge in Alabama

== Companies ==
- Nectar d.o.o., a Serbian beverage company
- Northeast Connecticut Telephone and Ride (NECTAR), predecessor to the Northeastern Connecticut Transit District

== Science and technology ==
- Nectar (National eResearch Collaboration Tools and Resources), now part of Australian Research Data Commons
- Nectar source, a flowering plant that produces nectar

== Given name ==
- Nectar Rose (born 1974), American actress
- Nectar Sanjenbam, Indian Army officer
- Nectar Woode (born 1999), English soul singer-songwriter

== Other uses ==
- Nectar, a fictional performance-enhancing drug in Free Radical Design's PlayStation 3 game, HAZE
- Nectar (loyalty card), a loyalty card issued by a partnership of United Kingdom retailers
- Nectar (Enanitos Verdes album), 1999
- Nectar (Joji album), 2020
- Nectar, a product strongly resembling wine in The Sims 3 World Adventures expansion pack, as well as in The Sims 4's Dine Out game pack
- "Nectar", a song by Opeth from Morningrise

== See also ==
- Nektar, a 1970s English/German progressive rock band based in Germany
