= Old Union Crossing Covered Bridge =

Old Union Crossing CB
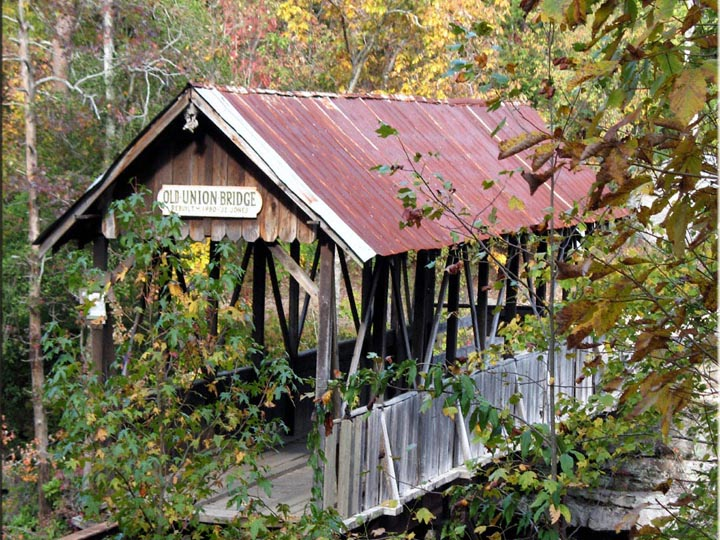
- The Old Union Crossing Covered Bridge near Mentone, Alabama.
- Coordinates: 34°32′3.51″N 85°35′56.47″W
- Carries: single lane motor traffic
- Crosses: West Fork of the Little River
- Locale: Mentone, Alabama
- Maintained by: PRIVATE USE
- ID number: 01-25-A (WGCB)

Characteristics
- Design: Stringer construction
- Total length: 90 ft (27 m)

History
- Construction end: circa 1863 (rebuilt 1980)

Location
- Interactive map of Old Union Crossing CB

The Old Union Crossing Covered Bridge is a privately owned wood & metal combination style covered bridge that spans the West Fork of the Little River in DeKalb County, Alabama, United States. It is located on an access road between Shady Grove Dude Ranch and Cloudmont Ski & Golf Resort on Lookout Mountain, which is off County Road 614 near the town of Mentone. Coordinates are 34°32′3.51″N 85°35′56.47″W (34.534308, -85.599019).

Originally built circa 1863, the 90-foot (27 m) bridge is a Stringer construction over three spans. Its current WGCB number is 01-25-A, formerly 01-25-02. It was rebuilt in 1980 over an existing cable bridge from the late 19th century. Due to its type of construction, the Old Union Crossing Covered Bridge is currently classified as a non-authentic covered bridge.

This bridge has also been called the Tallahatchee Covered Bridge, but these are actually two different structures. A couple of sources contradict time and place of bridge movement if both names applied to the same bridge. According to the current owners as well as most sources, the Old Union Crossing Covered Bridge was moved from Lincoln, Alabama in 1972 to its current location near Mentone. In reference to a document released by the Alabama Historical Commission in the early 1980s which lists all historic covered bridges in the state as well as a September 3, 1975 news article from The Anniston Star, the Tallahatchee Covered Bridge (also known as 'Tallasseehatchee' after the creek it originally spanned) was moved from Wellington, Alabama to Piedmont, Alabama (both in Calhoun County) in early September 1975 for becoming part of a reconstructed pioneer village and Appalachian crafts center. No information about the Tallahatchee Covered Bridge after the move nor of its continued existence is mentioned although it's possible the bridge may still be in private use today.

== History ==
According to the current owners, the Old Union Crossing Covered Bridge dates back to the American Civil War...possibly between 1863 and 1864. It was built by Union Army troops over Otter Creek (not Ottery Creek in nearby Calhoun County), now a dry bed located near the town of Lincoln in either Talladega County or Calhoun County. The bridge was used as an access route by Union forces throughout the war. It is unknown whether or not the bridge was open to motor traffic in later years. The Old Union Crossing Covered Bridge was purchased in 1972 by Jack E. Jones, original owner of Cloudmont Ski & Golf Resort, and moved north to Lookout Mountain near Mentone. The covered section was built over an existing steel cable bridge in 1980, replacing an earlier bridge built over the Little River fork in 1969. Initially, the covered section had slanted stringers only. It was later changed to vertical stringers with low-end exterior sides. Sources say the covered bridge was initially 42 feet (13 m) in length. In comparison, the Tallahatchee Covered Bridge was 60 feet (18 m) long...a unique combination of Multiple King-post and Town Lattice truss construction built in 1908. Either way, only the center portion of the current bridge is covered and not the entire 90-foot span.

In September 2004, the Old Union Crossing Covered Bridge sustained damage from Hurricane Ivan, primarily to the deck. The bridge was closed and remained under repairs as of late 2006, but is now fixed and once again open. Today, the bridge mostly serves as a crossing for horseback riders riding the trails to and from Shady Grove Dude Ranch. It also attracts history buffs and other visitors as well.

== See also ==
- List of Alabama covered bridges
