= Gerald Willis (politician) =

American businessman and politician (1940–2015)

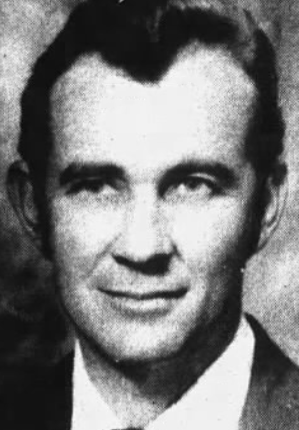

Member of the Alabama House of Representatives
- In office November 13, 1978 – 1982
- Preceded by: Tom Shelton
- Succeeded by: Glen Browder
- Constituency: 57th (1978–1982); 34th (1986–2002)
- In office 1986–2002
- Preceded by: Glen Browder

Member of the Calhoun County Commission
- In office January 4, 1971 – January 1, 1975
- Preceded by: Earl Morgan
- Succeeded by: Marshall Prickett

Personal details
- Born: Noah Gerald Willis; January 6, 1940 Nances Creek, Alabama, U.S.
- Died: February 13, 2015 (aged 75)
- Party: Democratic
- Spouse: Frances Keener
- Children: 3

Noah Gerald Willis (January 6, 1940 – February 13, 2015) was an American businessman and politician who served in the Alabama House of Representatives from 1978 to 1982, and 1986 to 2002, as a member of the Democratic Party. Willis also sought the Democratic presidential nomination in the 1984 election.

Willis was born in Nances Creek, Alabama, and worked as a bus driver and electrician before founding a lumber mill in 1965. His business grew to earn millions in the 1980s before shutting down in 1989. He used his wealth to construct a replica of Andrew Jackson's Hermitage. Willis was active in local politics in Calhoun County, Alabama, and was on the county commission.

Willis was elected to the state house in 1978, but did not seek reelection in order to focus on his presidential campaign. He was critical of the Democratic Party of Georgia and League of Women Voters for not recognizing his candidacy. He received a few thousand votes, but won the vice-presidential primary in New Hampshire. He unsuccessfully sought election to the United States House of Representatives in 1996 and 2002.

== Early life ==
Noah Gerald Willis was born in Nances Creek, Alabama, on January 6, 1940, to Noah Sanford and Myra Lou Rainey Willis. He graduated from White Plains High School. Willis married Frances Eloise Keener, with whom he had three children, on August 21, 1959.

== Career ==
=== Business ===
Willis was a bus driver for his school at age 15. He worked as an electrician in Anniston for three years. He created a sawmill business in 1965, using $350 in savings and a $1,700 loan. His company earned $14,000 in its first year and grew to earn around $2 million yearly by the 1980s. The lumber industry declined in the late 1980s and Willis had to fire 27 of his 29 employees in 1989, before closing his business and auctioning off his lumber mill.

Willis was an admirer of Andrew Jackson. In 1959, he determined that he wanted a mansion designed to be a copy of The Hermitage after watching The President's Lady. He first saw the building in 1972, and started construction on his own replica in Nances Creek, on July 7, 1978. His family moved into the house on July 4, 1980, months before construction was completed. The building cost $200,000. A resolution declaring his house the Alabama Hermitage was passed by the Alabama Legislature.

=== Local politics ===
Willis was elected to the Calhoun County Democratic Executive Committee in 1966. He was a trustee of the White Plains School, vice-president of the parent–teacher association, and president of the Civitan International of White Plains.

Earl Morgan, a member of the Calhoun County Commission, announced that he would not seek reelection in 1970. Willis placed first in the initial Democratic primary and won the runoff election. He defeated Republican nominee H. Brad Snead. He was the youngest man elected to the county commission. Willis lost renomination to Marshall Prickett in the 1974 primary.

=== State legislature ===
==== Elections ====
Tom Shelton, a member of the Alabama House of Representatives from the 57th district, announced that he would not seek reelection in 1978. Willis announced his candidacy on May 25, and placed first in the initial Democratic primary before defeating John Nisbet Jr. in the runoff. He defeated Republican nominee Orval Matteson. Willis did not seek reelection in 1982, and was succeeded by Glen Browder.

Willis sought the Democratic nomination in the 34th district in the 1986 election. He placed first in the initial Democratic primary and defeated Ed Kimbrough in the runoff. He defeated Republican nominee A.C. Shelton Jr. in the general election. In 1990, Willis defeated Jerry Smith, mayor pro tem of Jacksonville, in the primary and faced no opposition in the general election. In 1994, he defeated Frank Cobb in the Democratic primary and faced no opposition in the general election. He faced no opposition in the 1998 election.

==== Tenure ====
During Willis' tenure in the state house he served on the Agriculture, Banking, Insurance, and Local Government committees. He served as vice-chair of the Business and Labor committee and vice-chair and chair of the Conservation committee.

Willis supported George Wallace in the 1982 gubernatorial election. He supported Tom Drake for speaker in 1991. Willis considered seeking the Democratic lieutenant gubernatorial nomination in the 1994 election.

=== Presidential campaign ===
The first person Willis voted for president was John F. Kennedy. In 1980, Willis and his wife ran to serve as delegates to the Democratic National Convention for Jimmy Carter from the Alabama's 3rd congressional district, but were unsuccessful. He ran to serve as a delegate from the 3rd congressional district to the 2000 Democratic National Convention.

On February 11, 1982, Willis stated that he was considering running for the Democratic nomination in the 1984 presidential election. He announced that he would not run for reelection to the state house and instead run for president on April 19. His campaign headquarters was in Piedmont, Alabama, and his wife served as his campaign manager.

Willis attended the 1983 Georgia Jefferson–Jackson Dinner, but was not recognized as a presidential candidate. Paul Weston, executive director of the Democratic Party of Georgia, stated that the party limited recognition to those recognized by the national media. He placed third behind Alan Cranston and Fritz Hollings in a straw poll conducted by the Alabama Young Democrats. He considered switching to seek the presidential nomination of the American Independent Party. He criticized the League of Women Voters for not inviting him to a debate hosted on March 11, 1984.

Willis was the third candidate to qualify for Alabama's Democratic presidential primary. Bert Lance, the chair of the Democratic Party of Georgia, added Willis' name to the state's primary ballot "in the interest of fairness" and due to Willis performing better than multiple major candidates in the delegate selection caucus. He focused his campaign on Alabama, Georgia, and New Hampshire.

By December 1983, Willis believed that Walter Mondale had "the thing sewn up", but hoped to gain enough support in the primaries to be considered for the vice presidential nomination. Willis received 50 votes in New Hampshire, 6,153 votes in Alabama, and 1,804 votes in Georgia. He ran in the American Independent presidential primary in California, but placed last behind Gordon "Jack" Mohr, A.J. Lowery, and Charles Glenn. He unsuccessfully attempted to serve as an at-large delegate to the Democratic National Convention. Willis won the New Hampshire Democratic vice-presidential primary. He raised $143,505, with $122,755 coming from himself, and spent $143,274 during his campaign.

=== Congressional campaigns ===
In 1996, Browder, a Democratic member of the United States House of Representatives from the 3rd congressional district, chose to run in the U.S. senatorial election rather than seek reelection. Willis announced his campaign for the Democratic nomination on February 16, but placed third behind T. D. Little and Gerald Dial. Willis did not endorse Dial, but stated that he would vote for him. He raised $179,135, with $150,000 coming from himself, and spent $178,278 during the campaign.

Willis said that he would run in the 2002 election if he was still within the 3rd congressional district after redistricting. Willis announced his campaign on January 30, 2002, but lost in the Democratic primary to Joe Turnham. Willis endorsed Republican nominee Mike Rogers. Rogers, who narrowly won the election, credited his victory to Willis' endorsement. He raised and spent $479,087, with $424,884.51 being a loan from himself, during the campaign.

== Later life ==
Willis suffered a heart attack on April 7, 1998. He was appointed to the Natural Resources Conservation Service by George W. Bush. He died on February 13, 2015. Rogers was one of the people who officiated his funeral.

== Political positions ==
In 1982, Willis proposed a resolution asking the United States Congress to support legislation by Representative Henry B. González that would repeal the Federal Reserve Act. Willis supported legislation that criminalized marital rape. He opposed the closure of Fort McClellan. He voted in favor of a resolution calling for President Bill Clinton to continue a ban on gay people serving in the military. He voted in favor of anti-abortion legislation. Willis proposed legislation to put "In God We Trust" posters in all classrooms.

Willis supported the invasion of Grenada and funding for groups opposed to the Sandinista National Liberation Front, but opposed sending the United States Marine Corps to Lebanon. He supported the SALT II Treaty, a nuclear freeze, and a 2.5% yearly cut in the defense budget. He wanted to repeal the General Agreement on Tariffs and Trade and North American Free Trade Agreement.

== Electoral history ==
1970 Calhoun County Commission Democratic primary
Party	Candidate	Votes	%
Democratic	Gerald Willis	4,199	27.31%
Democratic	Marshall Prickett	4,086	26.58%
Democratic	Jerre Evans	3,630	23.61%
Democratic	Floyd Holder	3,460	22.50%
Total votes		15,375	100.00%

1970 Calhoun County Commission Democratic runoff primary
Party	Candidate	Votes	%
Democratic	Gerald Willis	13,114	51.19%
Democratic	Marshall Prickett	12,506	48.81%
Total votes		25,620	100.00%

1970 Calhoun County Commission election
Party	Candidate	Votes	%
Democratic	Gerald Willis	15,936	88.31%
Republican	H. Brad Snead	2,110	11.69%
Total votes		18,046	100.00%

1974 Calhoun County Commission Democratic primary
Party	Candidate	Votes	%
Democratic	Marshall Prickett	9,678	55.21%
Democratic	Gerald Willis (incumbent)	6,458	36.84%
Democratic	Wilson Richardson	1,394	7.95%
Total votes		17,530	100.00%

1978 Alabama House of Representatives 57th district Democratic primary
Party	Candidate	Votes	%
Democratic	Gerald Willis	2,573	47.40%
Democratic	John Nisbet Jr.	1,357	25.00%
Democratic	Joseph Read	1,244	22.92%
Democratic	Jerre Evans	254	4.68%
Total votes		5,428	100.00%

1978 Alabama House of Representatives 57th district Democratic runoff primary
Party	Candidate	Votes	%
Democratic	Gerald Willis	4,273	66.15%
Democratic	John Nisbet Jr.	2,187	33.85%
Total votes		6,460	100.00%

1978 Alabama House of Representatives 57th district election
Party	Candidate	Votes	%
Democratic	Gerald Willis	3,900	81.15%
Republican	Orval Matteson	905	18.83%
Write-ins	Margaret Stout	1	0.02%
Total votes		4,806	100.00%

1984 New Hampshire Democratic vice-presidential primary
Party	Candidate	Votes	%
Democratic	Gerald Willis	14,870	66.75%
Democratic	Alwin Hopfmann	6,351	28.51%
Democratic	George H. W. Bush (write-in)	1,057	4.74%
Total votes		22,278	100.00%

1986 Alabama House of Representatives 34th district Democratic primary
Party	Candidate	Votes	%
Democratic	Gerald Willis	3,005	42.50%
Democratic	Ed Kimbrough	2,138	30.24%
Democratic	K. Johnson	1,927	27.26%
Total votes		7,070	100.00%

1986 Alabama House of Representatives 34th district Democratic runoff primary
Party	Candidate	Votes	%
Democratic	Gerald Willis	8,727	53.53%
Democratic	Ed Kimbrough	7,576	46.47%
Total votes		16,303	100.00%

1986 Alabama House of Representatives 34th district election
Party	Candidate	Votes	%
Democratic	Gerald Willis	6,191	65.80%
Republican	A.C. Shelton Jr.	3,218	34.20%
Total votes		9,409	100.00%

1990 Alabama House of Representatives 34th district Democratic primary
Party	Candidate	Votes	%
Democratic	Gerald Willis (incumbent)	3,410	52.51%
Democratic	Jerry Smith	3,084	47.49%
Total votes		6,494	100.00%

1990 Alabama House of Representatives 34th district election
Party	Candidate	Votes	%
Democratic	Gerald Willis (incumbent)	6,290	100.00%
Total votes		6,290	100.00%

1994 Alabama House of Representatives 34th district Democratic primary
Party	Candidate	Votes	%
Democratic	Gerald Willis (incumbent)	4,037	70.55%
Democratic	Frank Cobb	1,685	29.45%
Total votes		5,722	100.00%

1994 Alabama House of Representatives 34th district election
Party	Candidate	Votes	%
Democratic	Gerald Willis (incumbent)	5,180	100.00%
Total votes		5,180	100.00%

1996 U.S. House of Representatives Alabama 3rd congressional district Democratic primary
Party	Candidate	Votes	%
Democratic	T. D. Little	25,092	46.78%
Democratic	Gerald Dial	13,843	25.81%
Democratic	Gerald Willis	11,714	21.84%
Democratic	Lea Fite Jr.	2,993	5.58%
Total votes		53,642	100.00%

1998 Alabama House of Representatives 34th district election
Party	Candidate	Votes	%
Democratic	Gerald Willis (incumbent)	8,249	98.93%
Write-in		89	1.07%
Total votes		8,338	100.00%

2002 U.S. House of Representatives Alabama 3rd congressional district Democratic primary
Party	Candidate	Votes	%
Democratic	Joe Turnham	30,245	52.40%
Democratic	Gerald Willis	22,336	38.70%
Democratic	Willie Burnett	5,139	8.90%
Total votes		57,720	100.00%

== Works cited ==
- Cleland, Max, ed. (1984). Consolidated Vote State Democratic and Republican Presidential Preference Primary March 13, 1984 (PDF). Georgia Secretary of State.
- Fu, March, ed. (1984). Statement of Vote: Primary Election June 5, 1984. Secretary of State of California.
- Morgan, Christopher (1985). State of New Hampshire Manual for the General Court. New Hampshire Secretary of State.
- Morgan, Christopher (1985). State of New Hampshire Manual for the General Court. New Hampshire Secretary of State.
