= Kymulga Mill & Covered Bridge =

- Kymulga Mill
- U.S. National Register of Historic Places
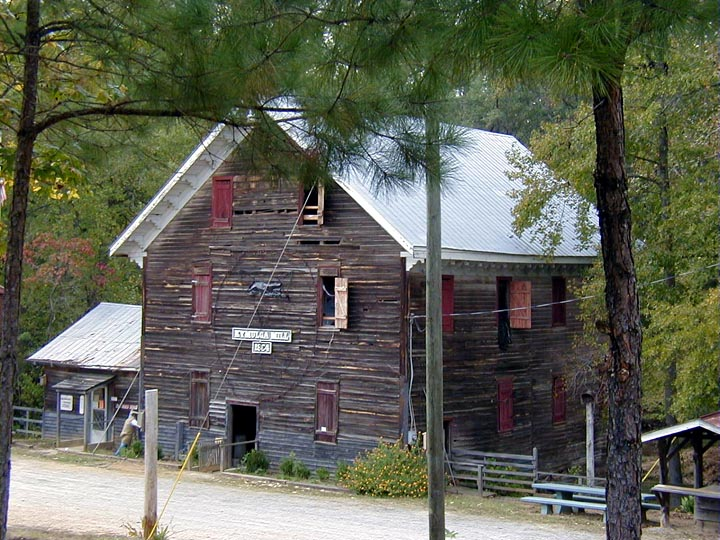
- Kymulga Mill near Childersburg, Alabama

- Location within Alabama Location within the United States
- Nearest city: Childersburg, Alabama
- Coordinates: 33°20′2″N 86°18′0″W
- Built: 1864
- NRHP reference No.: 76000356
- Added to NRHP: October 29, 1976

Kymulga Covered Bridge
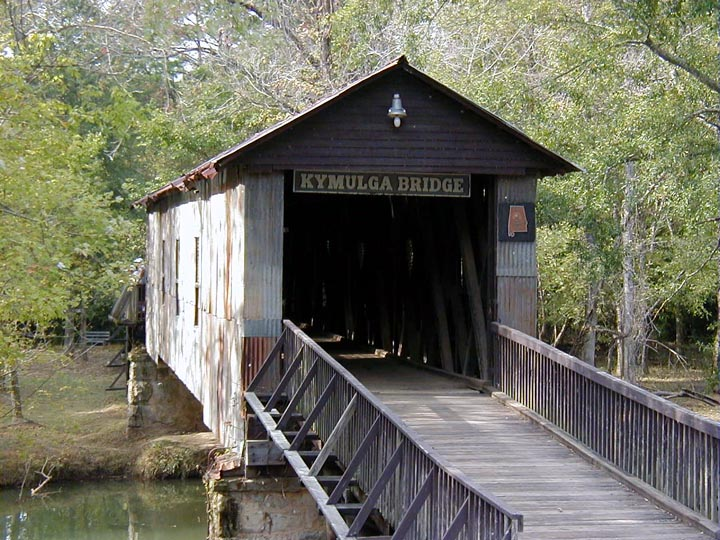
- Kymulga Covered Bridge near Childersburg, Alabama.
- Coordinates: 33°20′3″N 86°18′0″W
- Carries: pedestrian traffic
- Crosses: Talladega Creek
- Locale: Childersburg, Alabama
- Maintained by: City of Childersburg
- ID number: 01-61-01 (WGCB)

Characteristics
- Design: Howe truss
- Total length: 105 ft (32 m)

History
- Construction end: 1861

Location
- Interactive map of Kymulga Covered Bridge

Kymulga Mill & Covered Bridge are two locally owned historic landmarks located at Kymulga Park in Talladega County, Alabama, United States. The park is on Grist Mill Road (CR 46) off State Route 76 about 4 miles (6.4 kilometers) northeast of the city of Childersburg.

Both structures, dating back to the American Civil War, were restored in 1974 and were listed on the National Register of Historic Places on October 29, 1976. The Childersburg Heritage Committee purchased the tract in 1988, and with help from the Alabama Historical Commission and the Talladega County Commission, established Kymulga Park. More structural renovations were made as well. There is an admission charge to visit the park, with proceeds being used for upkeep of all structures and nature trails within this historic recreation area.

Kymulga Park was acquired by the City of Childersburg in June 2011. It is currently managed by the Childersburg Historic Preservation Commission.

== Kymulga Mill ==
Kymulga Mill is a working gristmill built in 1864 by German contractor G.E. Morris for Confederate Army Major George H. Forney, who was later promoted to lieutenant colonel. Forney died leading the 1st Confederate Infantry Battalion at the Battle of the Wilderness in Virginia before construction was completed, but his wife allowed Morris to finish it. Union Army soldiers burned most of the gristmills throughout the area during the Civil War, but Kymulga Mill was missed. The mill was sold four times before being purchased by the Childersburg Heritage Committee from latest owner Edward Donahoo in 1988, though it remained in active service through many of those years.

Three water powered turbines ran the four-story mill, including lights, grain elevator and millstones used for grinding grain. Two of its five sets are French buhrs, thought to be the hardest rock in the world. Kymulga Mill continues to operate to this day, though under electricity, still making corn meal with its huge millstones. The building is now a tourist attraction open for guided tours. It also serves as a gift shop and park office.

== Kymulga Covered Bridge ==
The Kymulga Covered Bridge is a wood & metal combination style covered bridge that spans Talladega Creek, located just east of Kymulga Mill within Kymulga Park. Built in 1861, the 105-foot (32 m) bridge is a Howe truss construction over a single span. The Kymulga Covered Bridge is one of two 19th-century covered bridges extant in Alabama still remaining at its original location; the Waldo Covered Bridge, also located in Talladega County, is the other.

The bridge once provided access to the Old Georgia Road or the McIntosh Road, a Native American trade route which was used by settlers and frontiersmen who ventured the area. Eventually, farms and communities spawned along the former trail. The United States government purchased land adjacent to Kymulga Mill in 1941 for the Alabama Ordnance Works, a military installation. Settlements within the tract had to be relocated. Today, the Kymulga Covered Bridge leads park visitors to a series of nature trails north of Talladega Creek. People may still find remnants of the Old Georgia Road, as well as other traces of the past.

== See also ==
- List of Alabama covered bridges
- List of historic gristmills
