= Waldo Covered Bridge =

Waldo CB
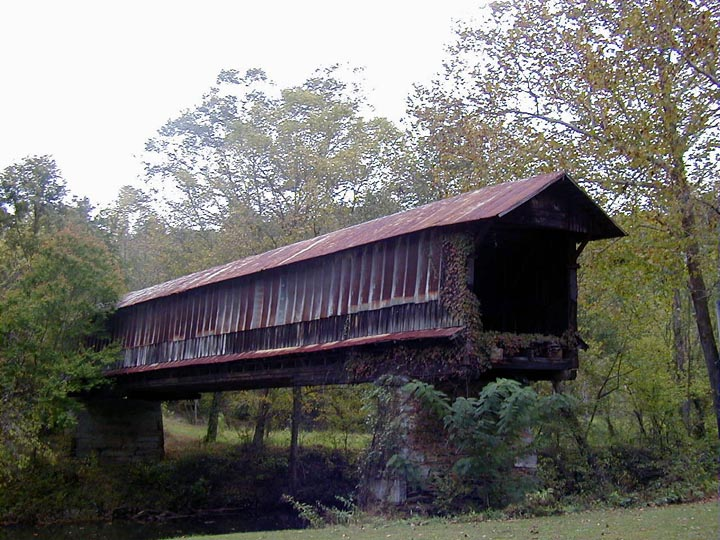
- The Waldo Covered Bridge near Talladega, Alabama.
- Coordinates: 33°22′44.78″N 86°01′43.87″W
- Carries: Bridge Inaccessible
- Crosses: Talladega Creek
- Locale: Waldo, Alabama
- Maintained by: PRIVATE USE
- ID number: 01-61-02 (WGCB)

Characteristics
- Design: Howe truss and Queen-post truss combination
- Total length: 115 ft (35 m)

History
- Construction end: 1858

Location
- Interactive map of Waldo CB

The Waldo Covered Bridge, also known as the Riddle Mill Covered Bridge, is a privately owned wood & metal combination style covered bridge that spans Talladega Creek in Talladega County, Alabama, United States. It is located off State Route 77 just south of the town of Waldo, about 6 miles (9.7 kilometers) southeast of Talladega. Coordinates are 33°22′44.78″N 86°01′43.87″W (33.379106, −86.028853).

Built in 1858, the 115-foot (35 m) bridge is a combination of Howe truss and Queen-post truss construction over a single span. Its WGCB number is 01-61-02. The Waldo Covered Bridge is currently eligible for addition to the National Register of Historic Places. It is the second oldest surviving covered bridge in the state, although it is also the only one not being maintained.

== History ==
The Waldo Covered Bridge was built on an old Socopatoy Indian trail behind Riddle's Mill, a grist mill which was later converted into the Waldo Town Hall and then a restaurant. Nearby is the Riddle's Hole gold mine, which operated from 1840 through World War II. The bridge was used as an access route in April 1865 by Wilson's Raiders during the American Civil War, a cavalry group led by Union Army General James H. Wilson. The bridge was open to traffic in later years, possibly for mine access during its operation, but condemned by the state in the 1960s and the approaches removed as overall maintenance remained minimal. Even though there was extensive restoration work done to the Waldo Covered Bridge in recent years as part of establishing a recreational park, the project was soon scrapped. As a result, the structure was left to sit on its two stone piers "as is." The Waldo Covered Bridge is currently inaccessible to the public but people can walk the grounds with permission from the Old Mill Restaurant. There were plans by the owners to once again restore the bridge, but time and money have been major issues. The restaurant closed and the property went up for sale. The restaurant is now open under new ownership.

== See also ==
- List of Alabama covered bridges
