= Oakachoy Covered Bridge =

Former bridge in Alabama, United States

Oakachoy CB
- Coordinates: 32°50′56.58″N 86°02′48.31″W
- Carries: pedestrian traffic
- Crosses: Oakachoy Creek
- Locale: Nixburg, Alabama
- Maintained by: Coosa County Commission
- ID number: 01-19-01 (WGCB)

Characteristics
- Design: Queen-post truss
- Total length: 56 ft (17 m)

History
- Architect: Melton Harris
- Construction end: 1916
- Closed: June 2, 2001 by fire

Statistics
- Daily traffic: pedestrian traffic
- Oakachoy Covered Bridge
- Formerly listed on the U.S. National Register of Historic Places
- Alabama Register of Landmarks and Heritage
- Area: less than one acre
- NRHP reference No.: 90000928

Significant dates
- Added to NRHP: June 14, 1990
- Designated ARLH: October 28, 1977
- Removed from NRHP: September 23, 2001

Location
- Interactive map of Oakachoy CB

The Oakachoy Covered Bridge (sometimes spelled 'Okachoy'), also known as the Thomas Covered Bridge, was a county-owned wooden covered bridge which spanned Oakachoy Creek in Coosa County, Alabama, United States. It was located in a remote area on the dirt portion of Newman Road off State Route 259 northeast of the community of Nixburg, about 6 miles (9.7 kilometers) southwest of Alexander City.

Built in 1916, the 56-foot (17-meter) bridge was a modified Queen-post truss construction over a single span. Its WGCB number is 01–19–01. The Oakachoy Covered Bridge was listed on the Alabama Register of Landmarks and Heritage on October 28, 1977.

The bridge was listed on the National Register of Historic Places on June 14, 1990. It was one of the shortest covered bridges built in Alabama. The Oakachoy Covered Bridge was burned down by vandals on June 2, 2001, ending the existence of the only remaining historic covered bridge in Coosa County. It had been maintained by the Coosa County Commission. The bridge was removed from the National Register on September 23, 2001.

== History ==
The Oakachoy Covered Bridge was built by Melton Harris of homemade timber at a cost of $400 for connecting two county seats, Rockford in Coosa County and Dadeville in Tallapoosa County. It is unknown when the bridge was closed to motor traffic in later years or when it was restored. Nearby are ruts which were forded in Oakachoy Creek by pioneer wagons over 150 years ago. All that remains of the Oakachoy Covered Bridge site are the stone foundations and a wooden post on the east side of the creek which shows obvious charring. Even though the bridge is gone, it is said the site is still haunted by a slave who was lynched and eventually hung inside the bridge many years ago. A major downplay to this legend though is that slavery was abolished throughout the United States with the passing of the 13th Amendment to the Constitution in 1865 and the Oakachoy Covered Bridge was known to be the only covered bridge built at the site which wasn't until 1916...well after the end of the American Civil War. There were other bridges constructed in the vicinity before the Oakachoy Covered Bridge which were short lived.

== See also ==
- List of Alabama covered bridges
