= Alamuchee Creek =

Stream in Alabama and Mississippi, United States

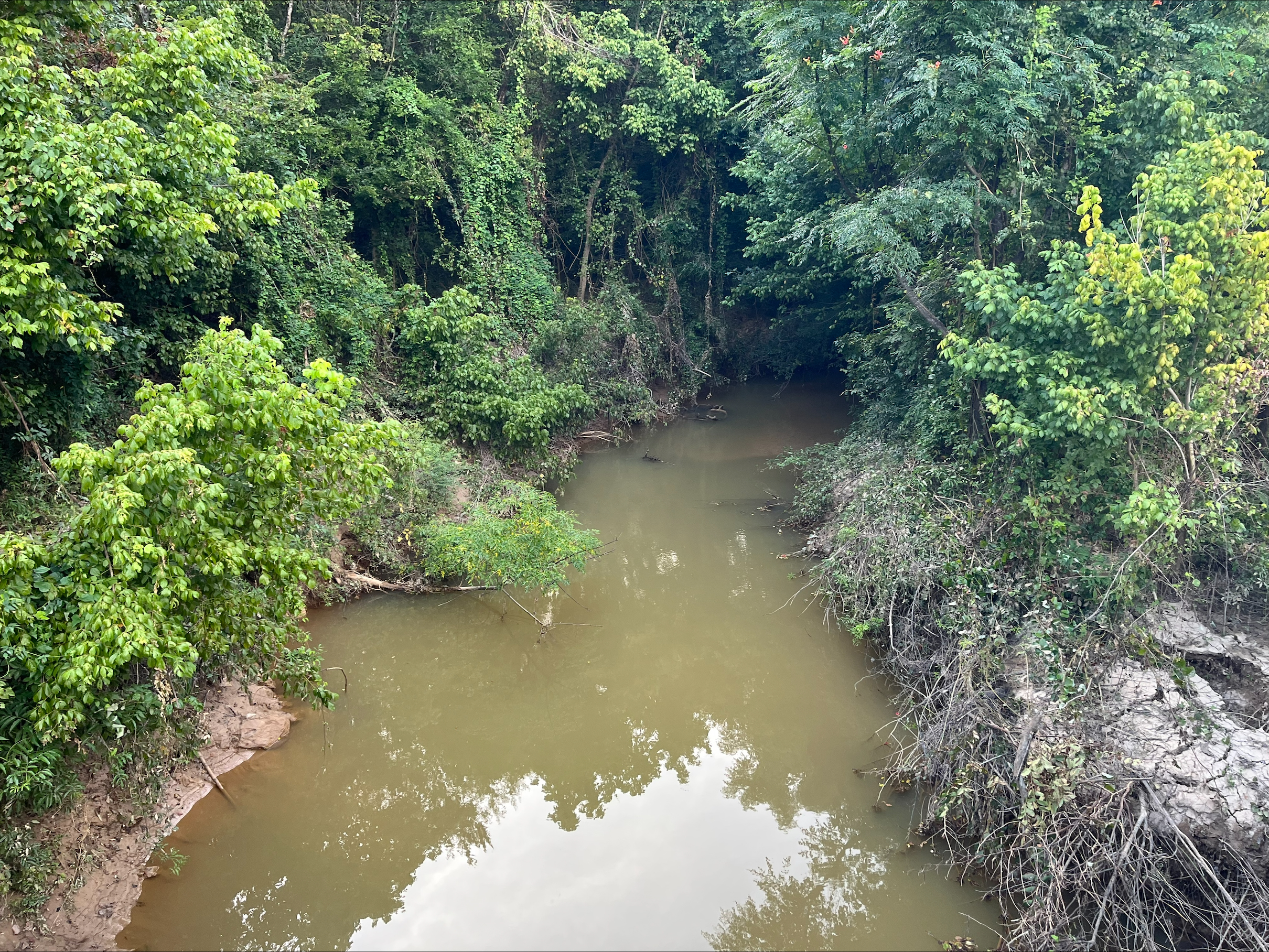
- Alamuchee Creek in Lauderdale County, Mississippi

Location
- Country: United States
- State: Alabama, Mississippi

Physical characteristics
- Source
  - coordinates: 32.3259759°N 88.5153153°W
- Mouth
  - coordinates: 32.4943043°N 88.1672466°W
- Length: 21.3 mi (34.3 km)
- Basin size: 62.3 mi^{2} (161 km^{2})

Alamuchee Creek is a stream in the U.S. states of Alabama and Mississippi. It is a tributary to the Sucarnoochee River.

Alamuchee most likely is a name derived from the Choctaw language meaning roughly "hiding place". Variant names are "Alamucha Creek", "Alamutchee Creek", "Allamucha Creek", "Allamuchee Creek", "Allamuchy Creek", "Allimucha Creek", and "Allimuchee Creek".

Tributaries include Little Alamuchee Creek and Toomsuba Creek.

The Alamuchee-Bellamy Covered Bridge once crossed Alamuchee Creek prior to being moved to the University of West Alabama campus in 1969.
