= Sucatolba Creek =

Stream in Mississippi, United States

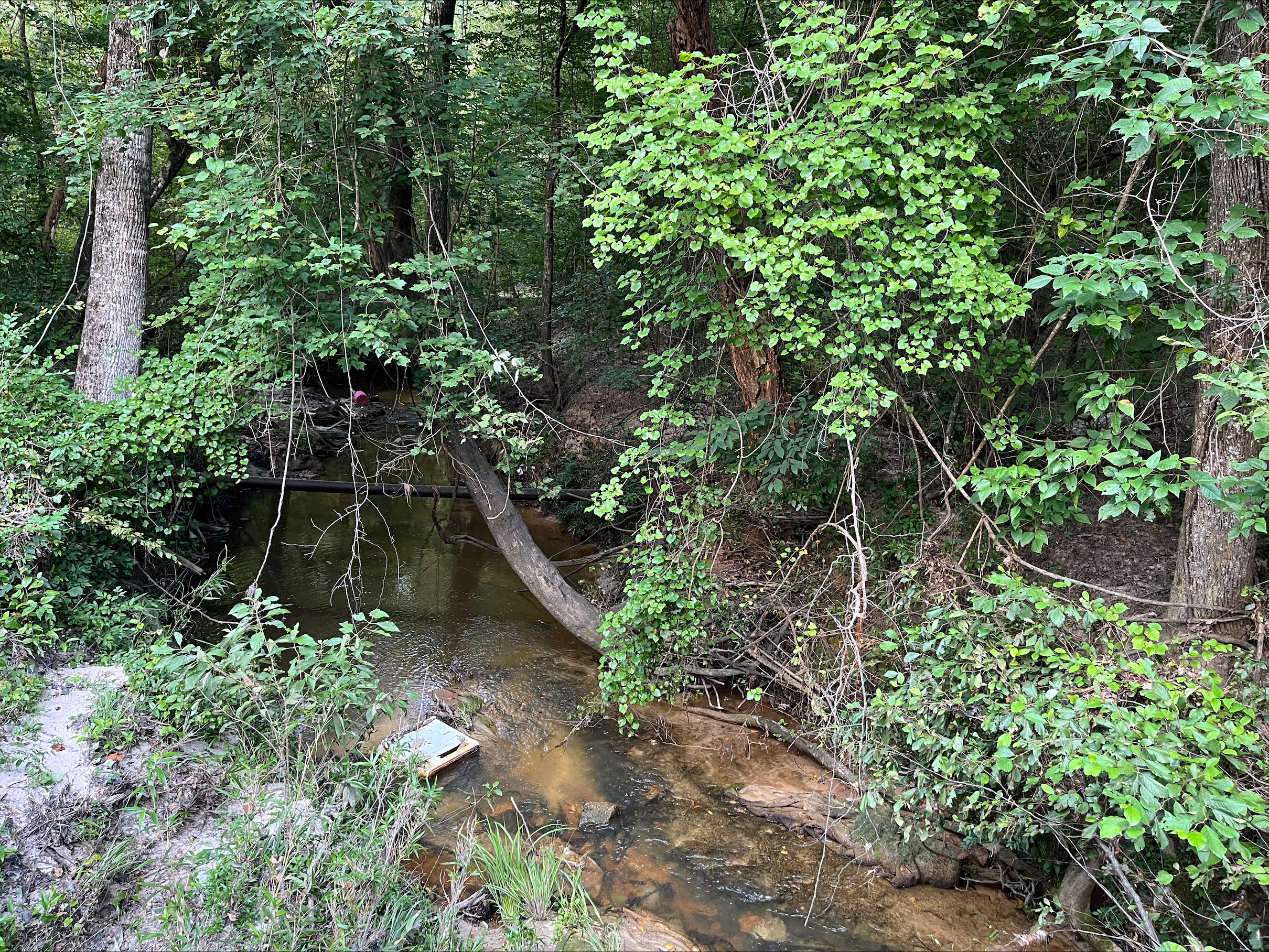
- Sucatolba Creek

Location
- Country: United States
- State: Mississippi

Physical characteristics
- Source
  - coordinates: 32.4487512°N 88.5192048°W
- Mouth
  - coordinates: 32.4665281°N 88.4269789°W
- Length: 5.5 mi (8.9 km)

Sucatolba Creek is a stream in the U.S. state of Mississippi. It is a tributary of Toomsuba Creek.

Sucatolba is a name derived from a Native American language and purported to mean "creek where opossums are killed".
