= Coldwater Covered Bridge =

Coldwater CB
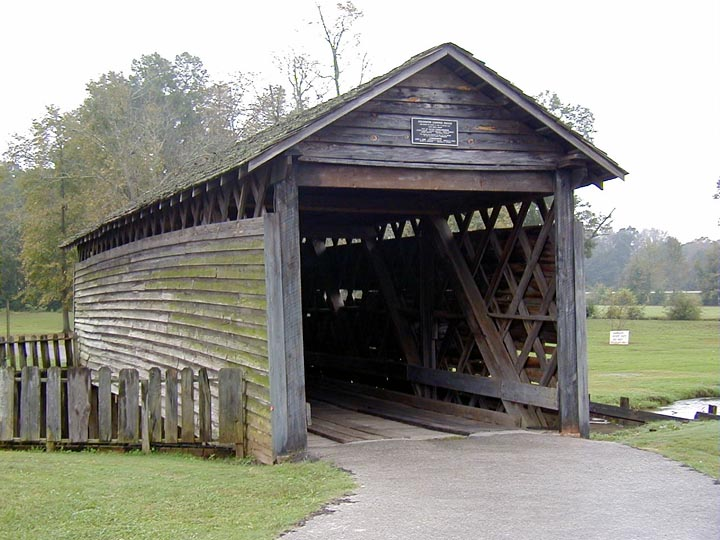
- The Coldwater Covered Bridge in Oxford, Alabama.
- Coordinates: 33°36′26.97″N 85°48′59.73″W
- Carries: pedestrian traffic
- Crosses: outflow from Oxford Lake (marble springs)
- Locale: Oxford, Alabama
- Maintained by: City of Oxford
- ID number: 01-08-01 (WGCB)

Characteristics
- Design: Multiple King-post truss with Town Lattice combination
- Material: Wood
- Total length: 63 ft (19 m)

History
- Construction end: ca. 1850
- Coldwater Creek Covered Bridge
- U.S. National Register of Historic Places
- Location within Alabama Location within the United States
- Area: less than one acre
- Architectural style: One Span Modified Kingpost
- NRHP reference No.: 73000333
- Added to NRHP: April 11, 1973

Location
- Interactive map of Coldwater CB

The Coldwater Covered Bridge, also known as the Hughes Mill Covered Bridge, is a locally owned wooden covered bridge that spans the outflow from Oxford Lake (marble springs) in Calhoun County, Alabama, United States. It is located at Oxford Lake Park off State Route 21 in the city of Oxford, about 4 miles (6.4 kilometers) south of Anniston.

Built circa 1850, the 63-foot (19-meter) bridge is a rare construction of Multiple King-post truss with Town Lattice over a single span. The Tallahatchee Covered Bridge, which was also located in Calhoun County, had a similar build. Its World Guide to Covered Bridges (WGCB) number is 01–08–01. As Coldwater Creek Covered Bridge, it was listed on the National Register of Historic Places on April 11, 1973. It is currently the oldest existing covered bridge in Alabama. The bridge is maintained by the City of Oxford.

== History ==
The Coldwater Covered Bridge was built by a former slave around 1850 (although some sources say it was built as early as 1839), originally located over Coldwater Creek on what is now Airport Road along the border of Calhoun and Talladega counties near the community of Coldwater (coordinates 33°35′9.29″N 85°54′46.8″W (33.585914, -85.913)). This is about 8 miles (13 kilometers) west of its current location. Nearby was Coldwater Mill, also known as Hughes Mill, a local saw and lumber mill owned by Peter N. Hughes and Humphrey Hughes. The bridge partially burned in the early morning hours of August 11, 1920, but was able to be repaired and remain open to motor vehicle traffic. A concrete and steel bridge eventually replaced the aging Coldwater Covered Bridge in 1974, which was soon left to temporarily survive the elements. In 1990, the bridge was fully restored and moved to Oxford Lake Park. The tin roof which was originally on the covered bridge has been replaced with a shingled roof. It is now one of many visited tourist attractions within the Anniston area.

== See also ==
- List of Alabama covered bridges
