= Toomsuba Creek =

Stream in Alabama and Mississippi, United States

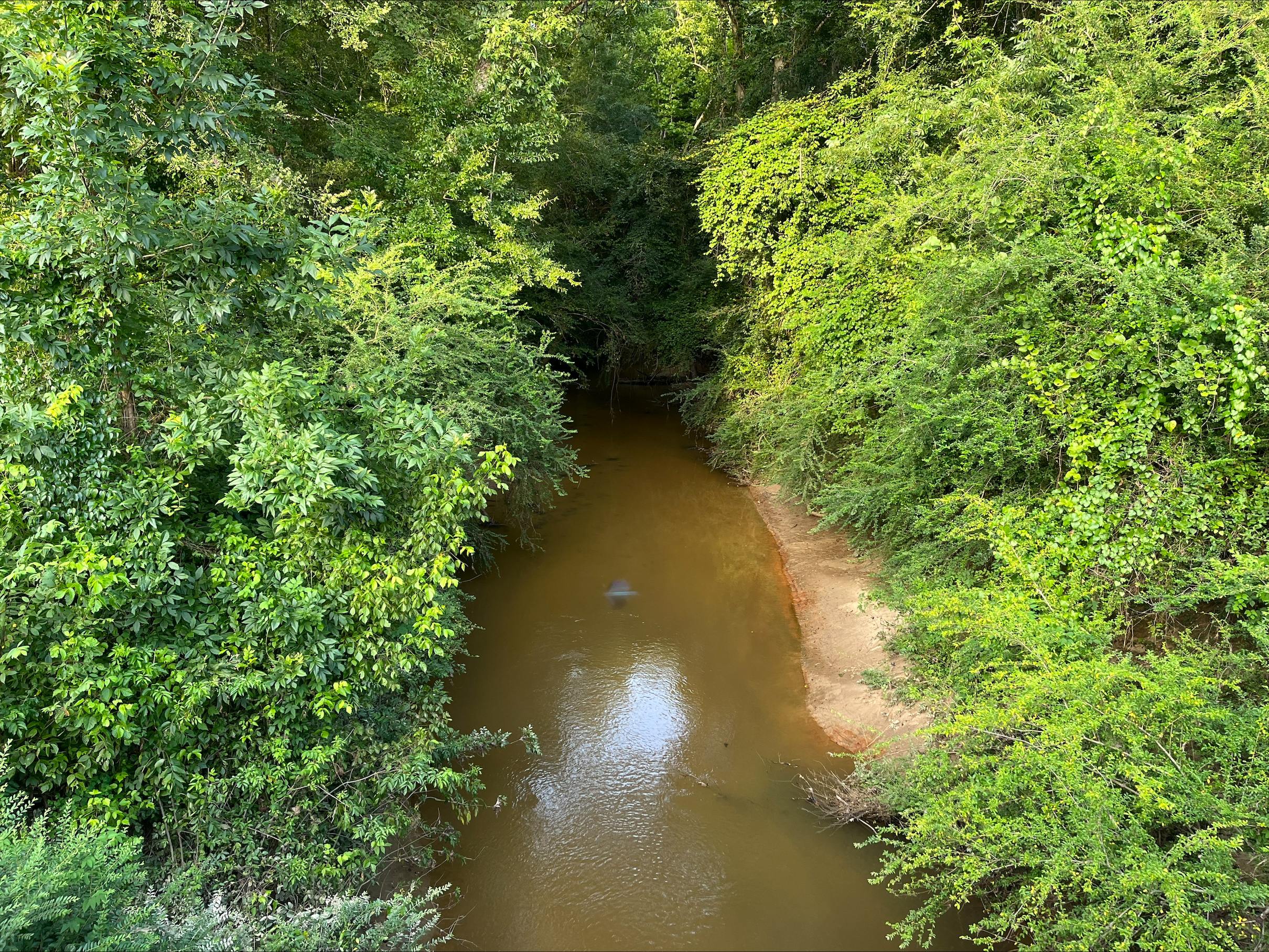
- Toomsuba Creek in Lauderdale County, Mississippi

Location
- Country: United States
- State: Alabama, Mississippi

Physical characteristics
- Source
  - coordinates: 32.4231967°N 88.583096°W
- Mouth
  - coordinates: 32.4787492°N 88.2936403°W
- Length: 17.2 mi (27.7 km)

Toomsuba Creek is a stream in the U.S. states of Alabama and Mississippi. It is a tributary to Alamuchee Creek.

Toomsuba is a name derived from the Choctaw language purported to mean either (sources vary) "blue pigeon hawk" or "fish hawk". Variant names are "Tonsabah Creek", "Tonsobah Creek", "Tonsubah Creek", "Toomseba Creek", "Toomsebah Creek", and "Toomsooba Creek".

Tributaries include Sucatolba Creek.

The creek lends its name to the nearby community of Toomsuba.
