= Nectar Covered Bridge =

Nectar CB
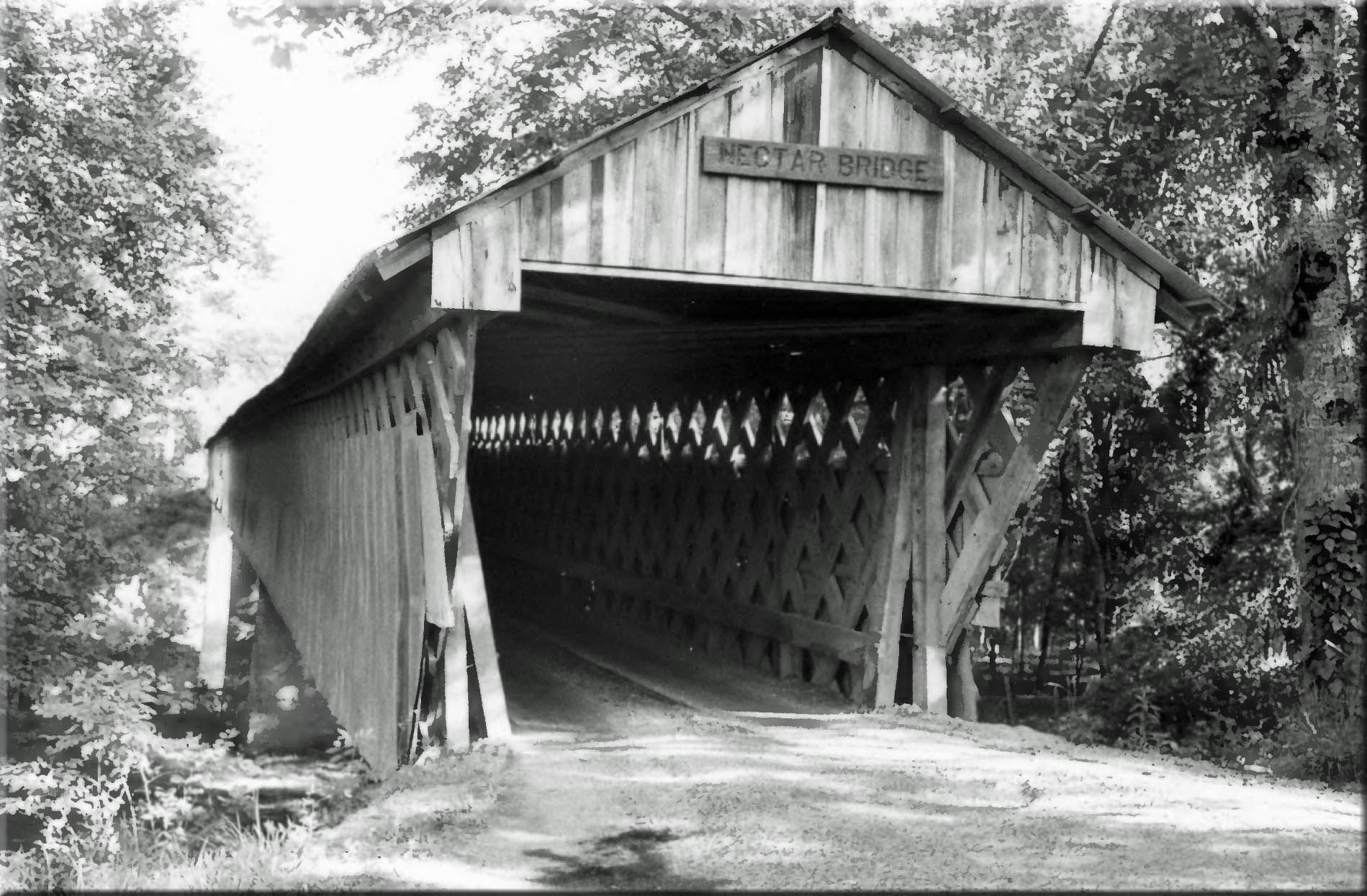
- An old photo of the Nectar Covered Bridge.
- Coordinates: 33°57′22.45″N 86°37′34.17″W
- Carries: single lane motor traffic
- Crosses: Locust Fork of the Black Warrior River
- Locale: Nectar, Alabama
- Maintained by: Blount County Commission
- ID number: 01-05-04 (WGCB)

Characteristics
- Design: Town Lattice truss
- Total length: 385 ft (117 m)
- Load limit: 3 US tons (2.72 metric tons)

History
- Construction end: 1934
- Closed: June 13, 1993 by fire
- Nectar Covered Bridge
- U.S. National Register of Historic Places
- Area: 1.1 acres (0.4 ha)
- Architectural style: Four Span Town Truss
- MPS: Blount County Covered Bridges TR
- NRHP reference No.: 81000124
- Added to NRHP: August 20, 1981

Location
- Interactive map of Nectar CB

The Nectar Covered Bridge was a wood and metal combination style covered bridge which spanned the Locust Fork of the Black Warrior River in Blount County, Alabama, United States. It was located on Nectar Bridge Road off State Route 160, just east of the town of Nectar, about 14 miles (16 kilometers) northwest of Oneonta. Nectar Covered Bridge was at one time the seventh-longest covered bridge in the country. The bridge remained open to single lane motor traffic from its construction until it was burned by vandals on June 13, 1993.

== History ==
Built in 1934, the 385-foot (117-meter) bridge was a Town Lattice truss construction over four spans. It was built by a crew led by foreman Zelma C. Tidwell over a wide section of the Locust Fork. It was the third-longest covered bridge built in Blount County. At one time, the Nectar Covered Bridge was the seventh longest covered bridge in the country. The bridge was burned by vandals on June 13, 1993. It was maintained by the Blount County Commission and the Alabama Department of Transportation. The Nectar Covered Bridge was listed on the National Register of Historic Places on August 20, 1981.

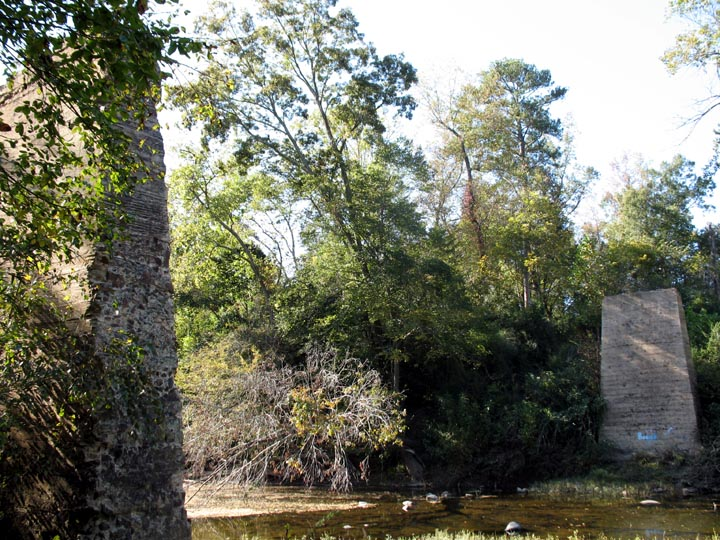
Two stone piers remain where the Nectar Covered Bridge once stood. The bridge burned down in 1993.

The bridge was once a community meeting place and a site for large baptism ceremonies. A concrete bridge has since replaced the former covered bridge, but the old stone piers remain across the river south of the current crossing.

== See also ==
- List of Alabama covered bridges
