= Allsboro, Alabama =

Unincorporated community in Alabama, United States

Allsboro
- Unincorporated community
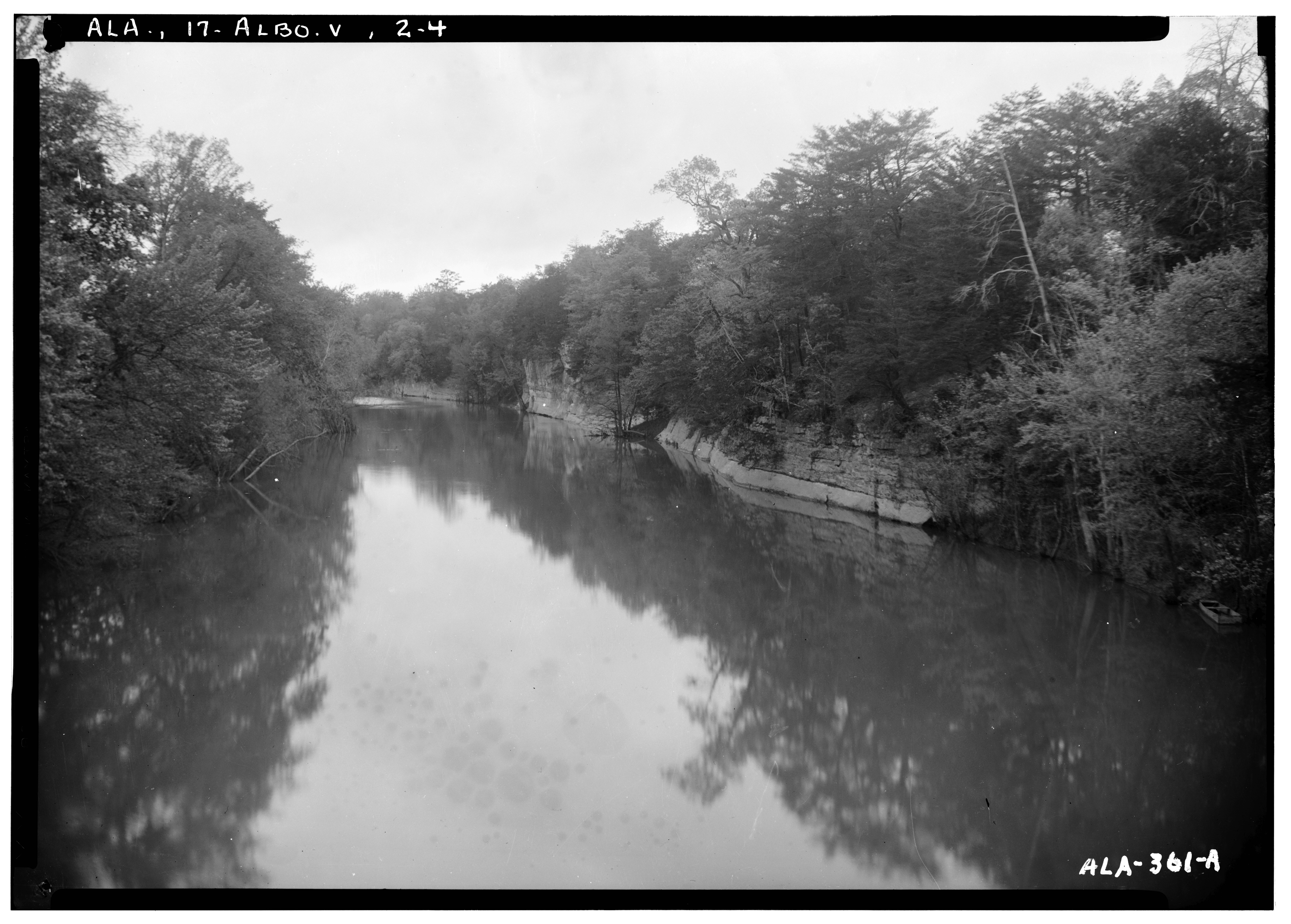
- Big Bear Creek, Allsboro, 1936

- Location in Alabama
- Coordinates: 34°41′39″N 88°06′37″W
- Country: United States
- State: Alabama
- County: Colbert
- Elevation: 640 ft (195 m)
- Time zone: UTC-6 (Central (CST))
  - Summer (DST): UTC-5 (CDT)
- ZIP code: 35616
- Area code: 256
- GNIS feature ID: 113039

Allsboro is a populated place in Colbert County, Alabama, United States. This unincorporated community is located in the far western area of the county, about 9 miles (14 km) southwest of the town of Cherokee, near the Mississippi state border.

== History ==
Allsboro was settled in the mid-19th century and named for the family of Bradley Alsobrook. A post office was established in Allsboro in 1851, though another source stated it was first established from 1848 to 1866 and resumed again from 1872 until being discontinued in 1955.

== Demographics ==
=== Allsboro ===
Historical population
Census	Pop.	Note	%±
1880	106		—
U.S. Decennial Census

Allsboro first appeared on the 1880 U.S. Census as an unincorporated village. It did not appear separately as a village again. For precinct, see below.

=== Historic Demographics ===
Census Year	Population	State Place Rank	County Place Rank
1880 (Note: 1st year Allsboro reported on census)	106 (-) (Note: (-)Indicates no immediate prior population figure or rank) (Note: Racial demographics not reported for places of less than 2,500 on 1880 census.)	163rd (-)	4th (-)

== Allsboro Precinct (1890-1950) ==
Historical population
Census	Pop.	Note	%±
1890	725		—
1900	651		−10.2%
1910	607		−6.8%
1920	740		21.9%
1930	491		−33.6%
1940	536		9.2%
1950	486		−9.3%
U.S. Decennial Census

The Allsboro Beat/Precinct (Colbert County 15th Precinct) first appeared on the 1890 U.S. Census. The village of Allsboro had previously been in the 6th beat (Dickson) in 1880 and the new 15th beat was subdivided from it. The Allsboro Precinct continued to report until 1950. In 1960, the precinct was merged as part of a larger reorganization of counties into the census division of Cherokee.

== Gallery ==
Below are photographs taken in Allsboro as part of the Historic American Buildings Survey:

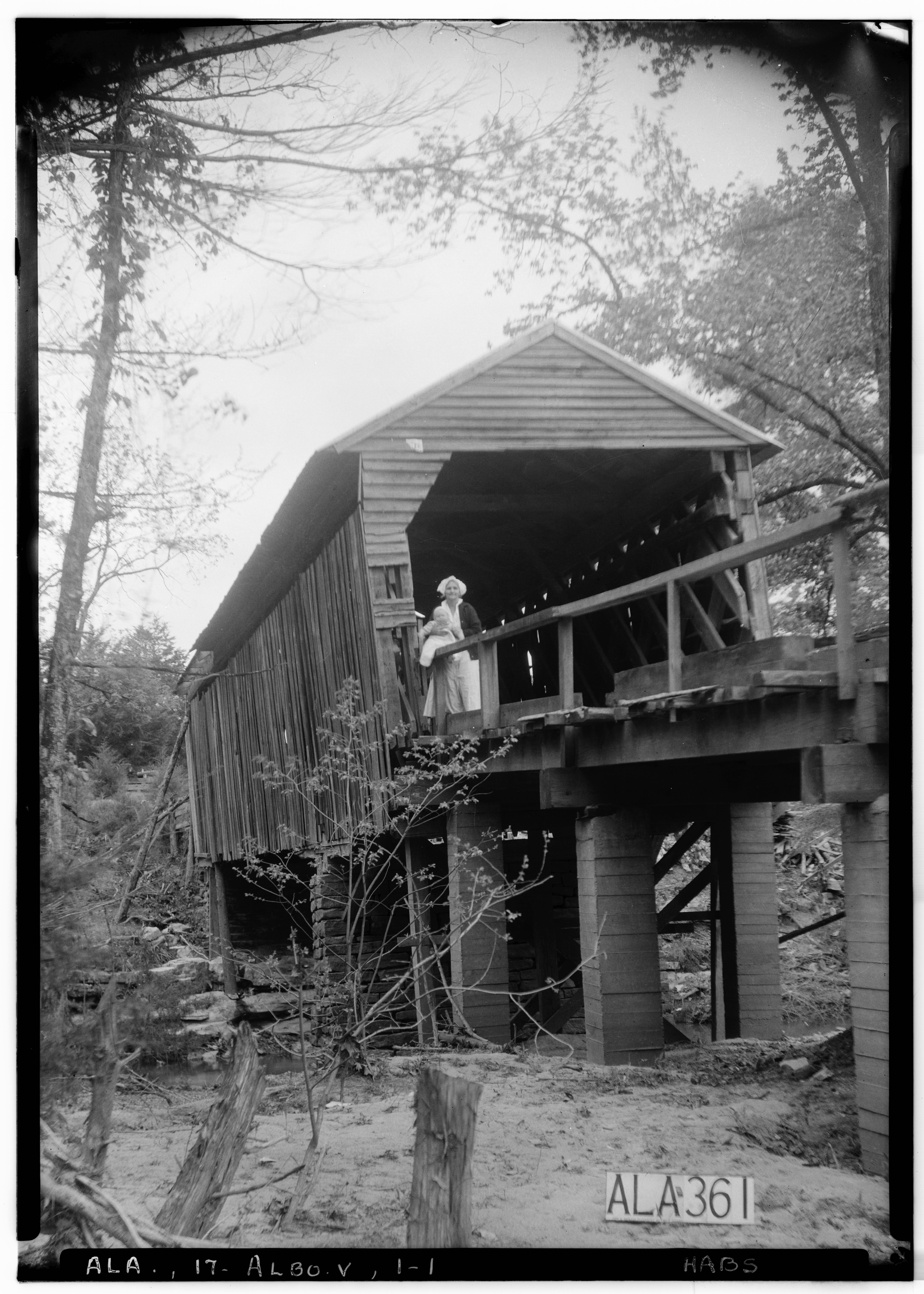
Cripple Deer Creek Covered Bridge

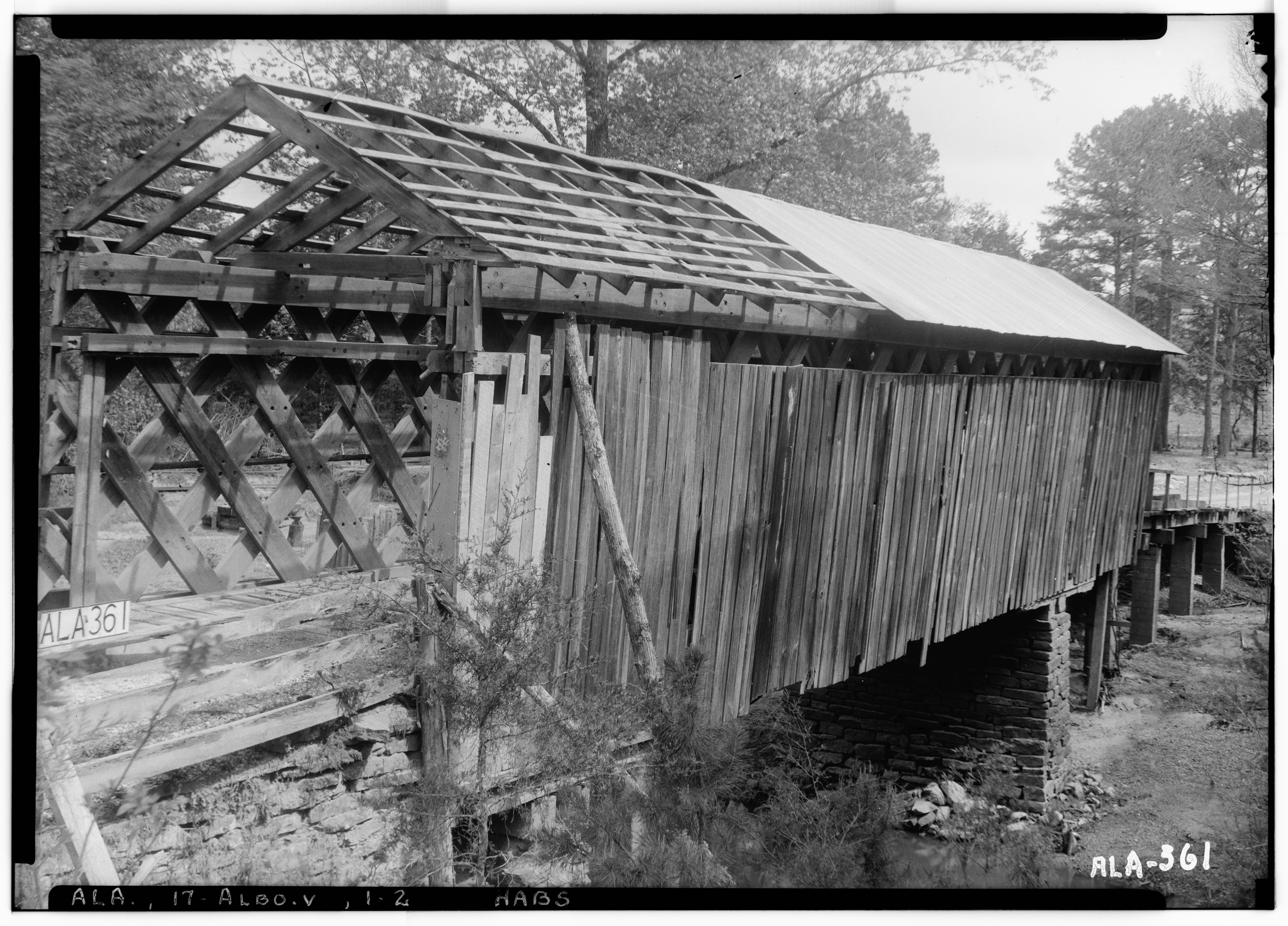
Cripple Deer Creek Covered Bridge

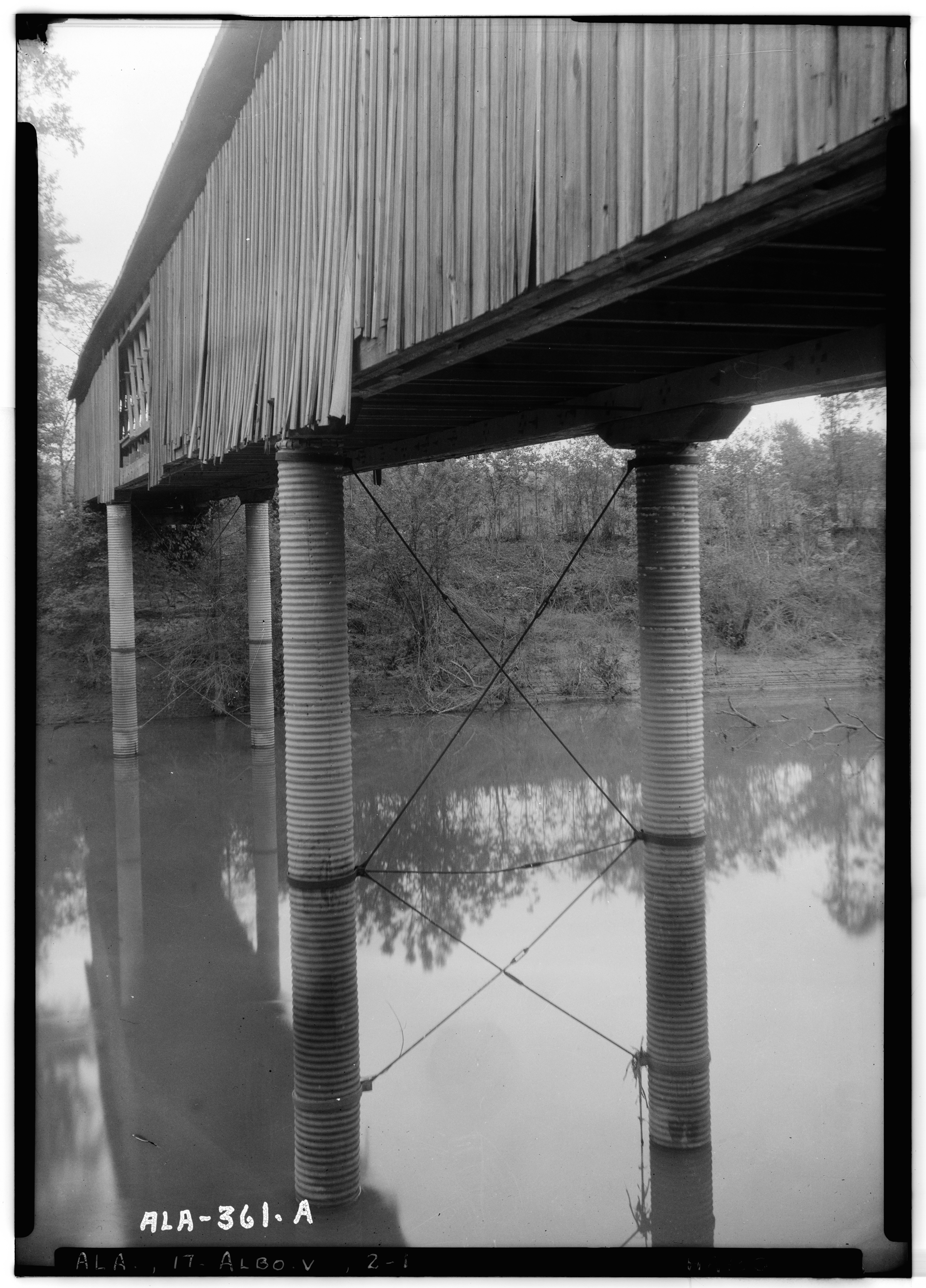
Underside of bridge

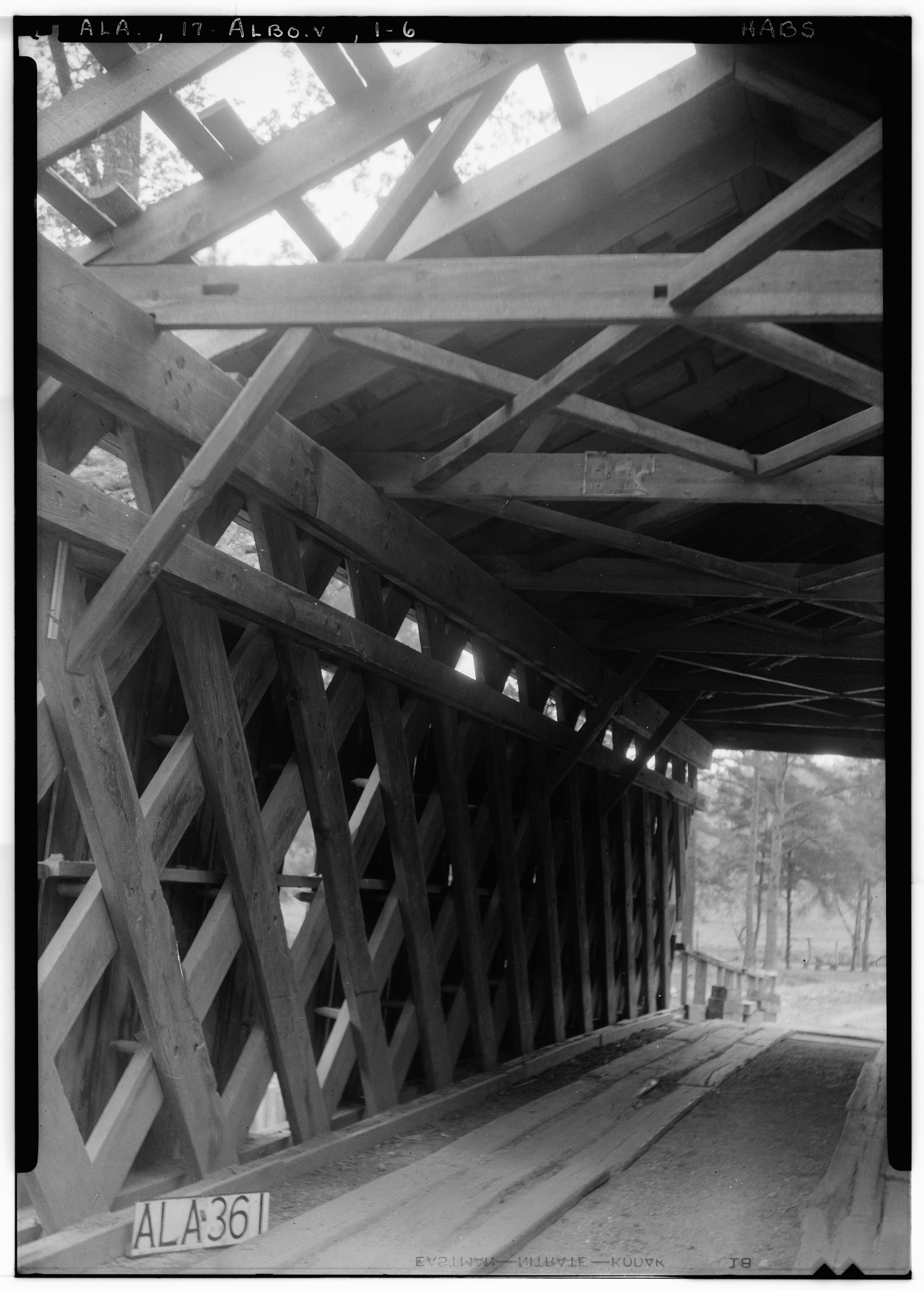
View through bridge to the south

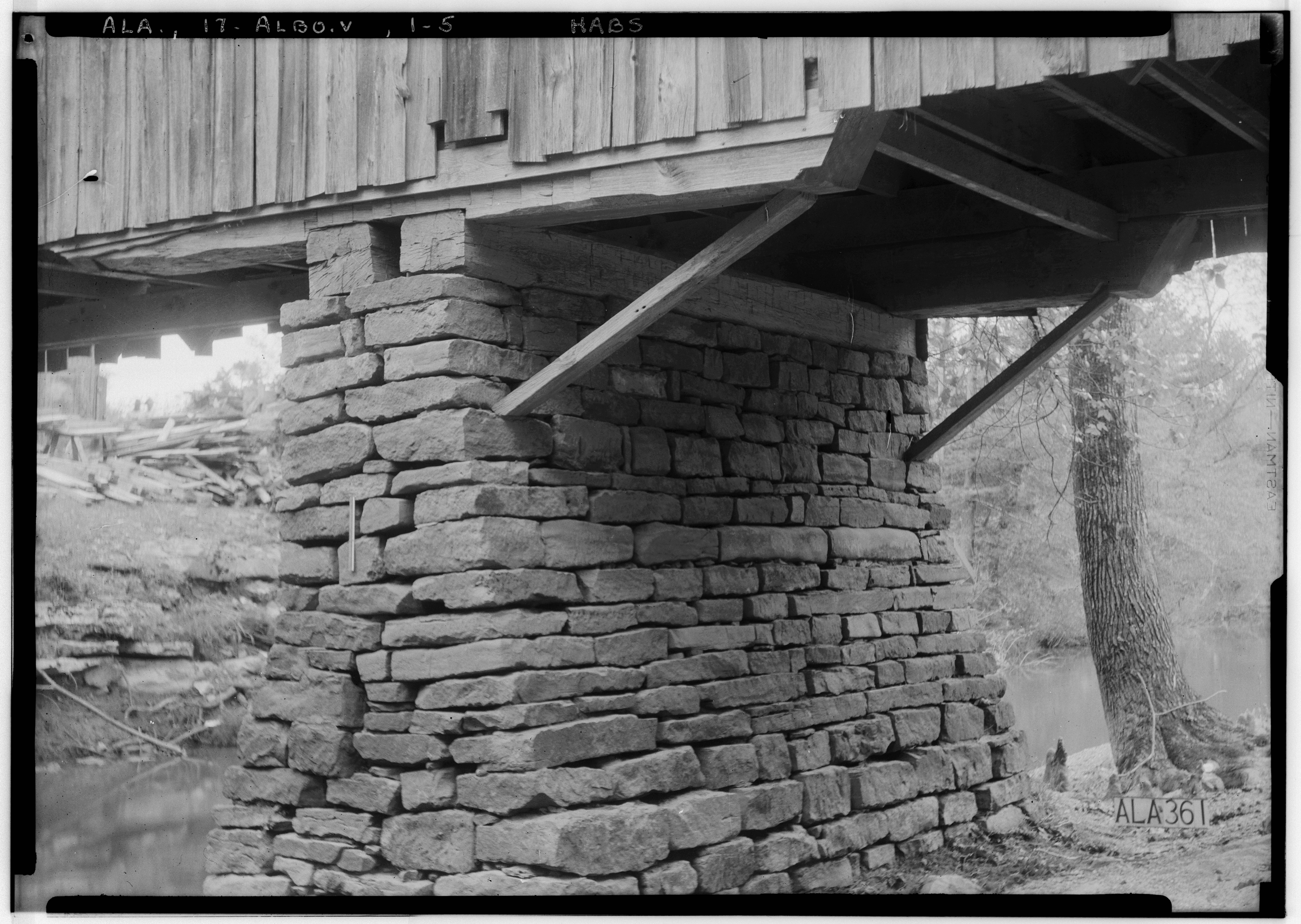
South Bank Bridge Foundation

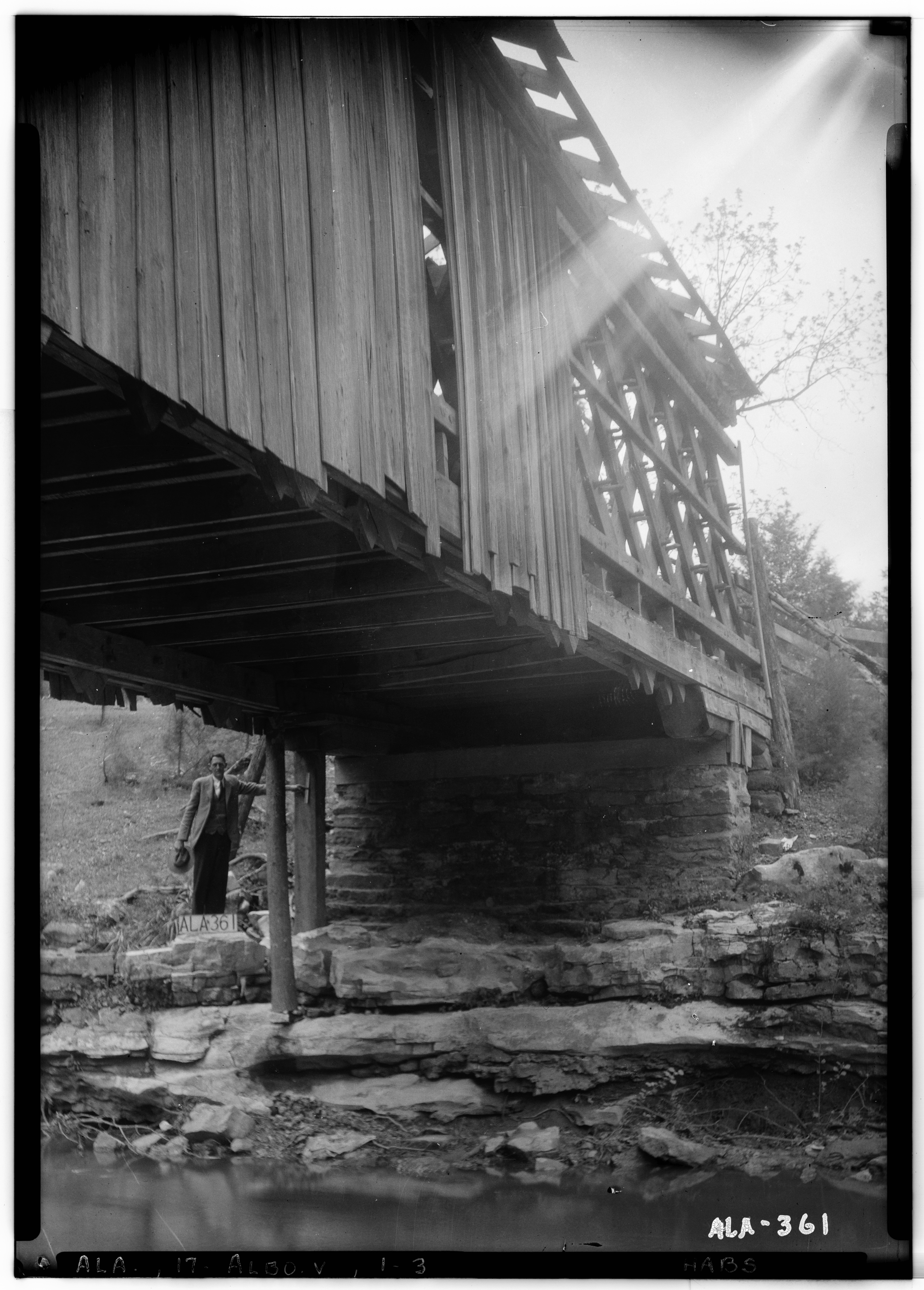
South side of bridge

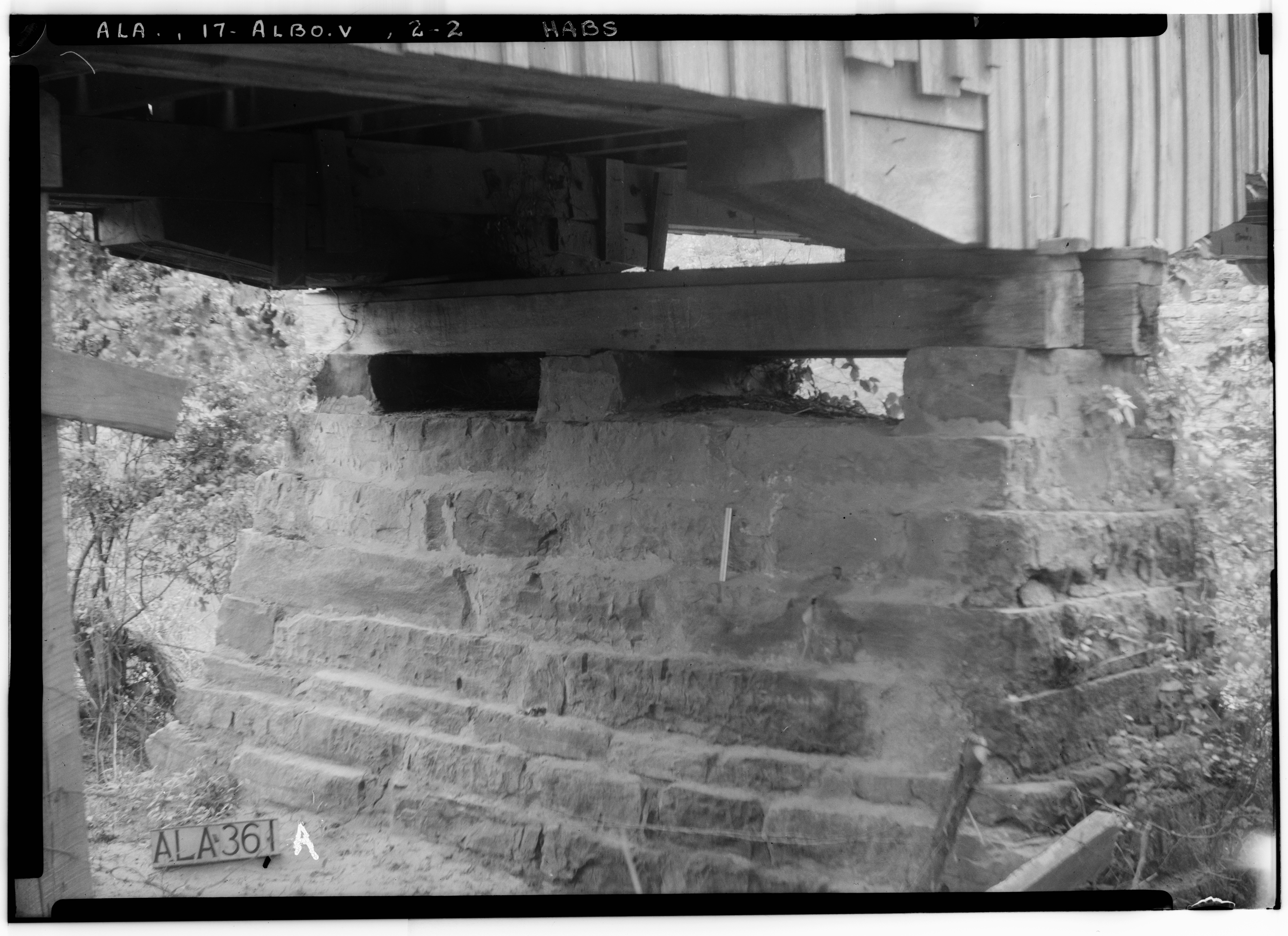
East End Bridge Foundation

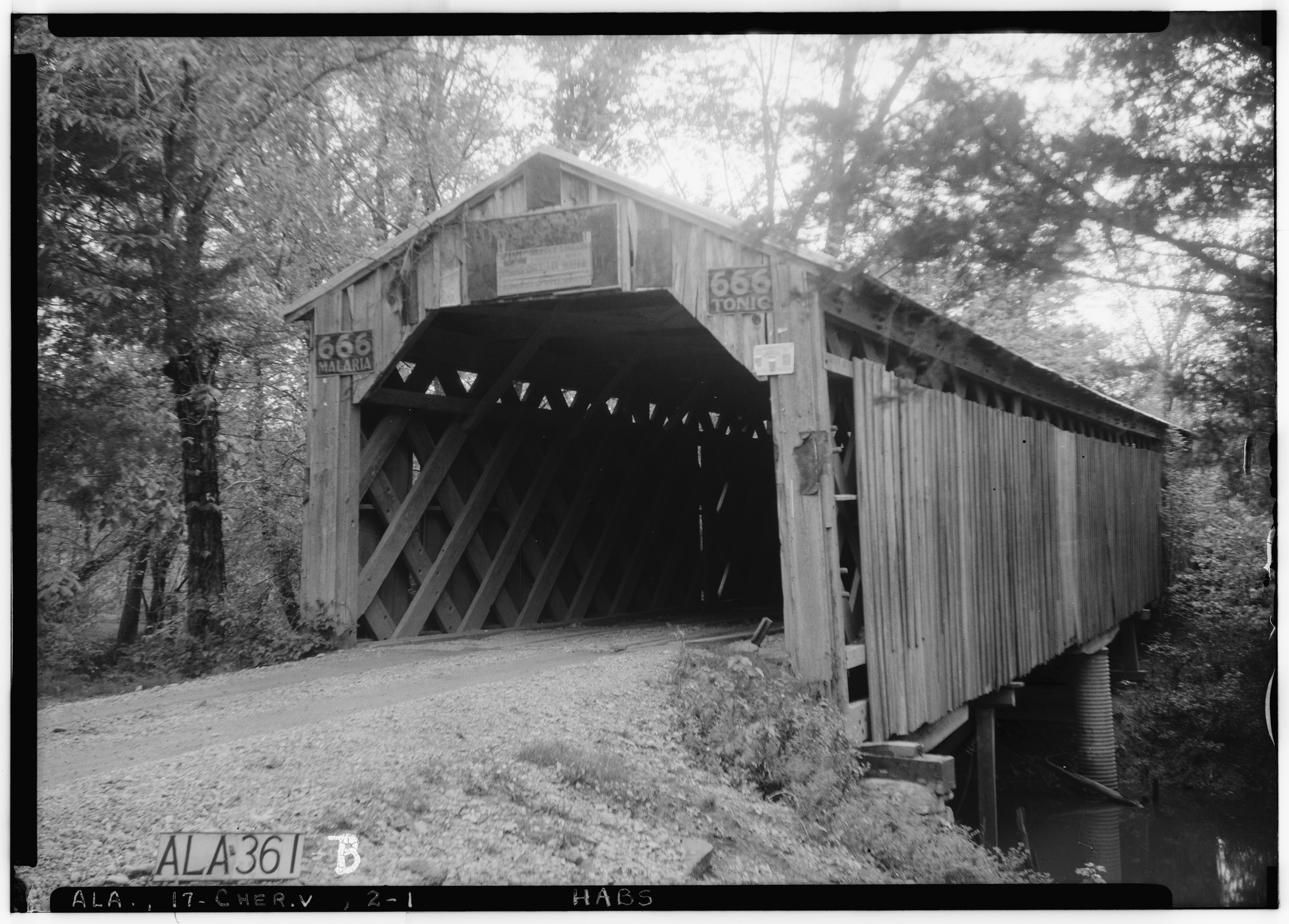
East End, Buzzard Roost Covered Bridge

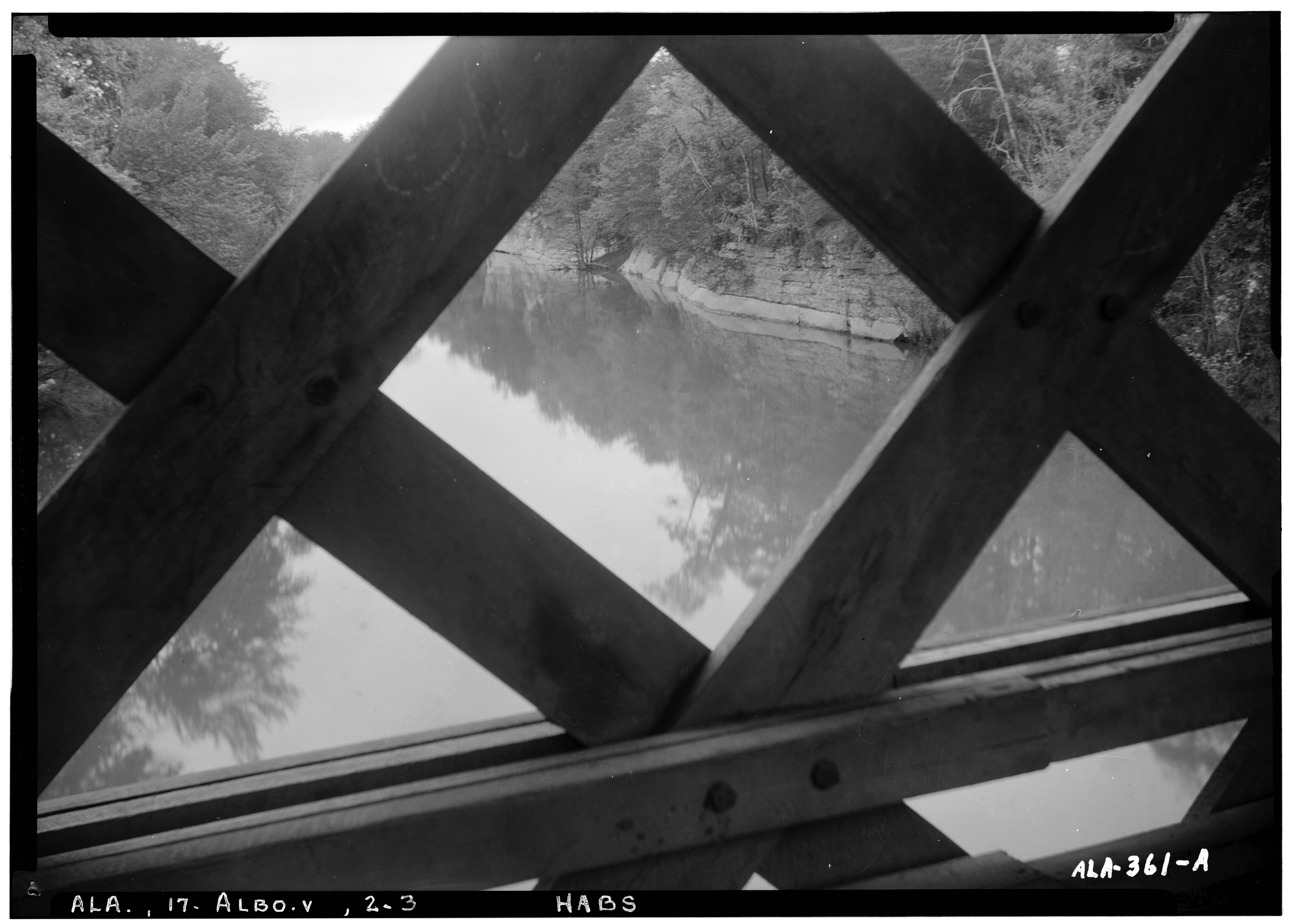
South Side View of Big Bear Creek

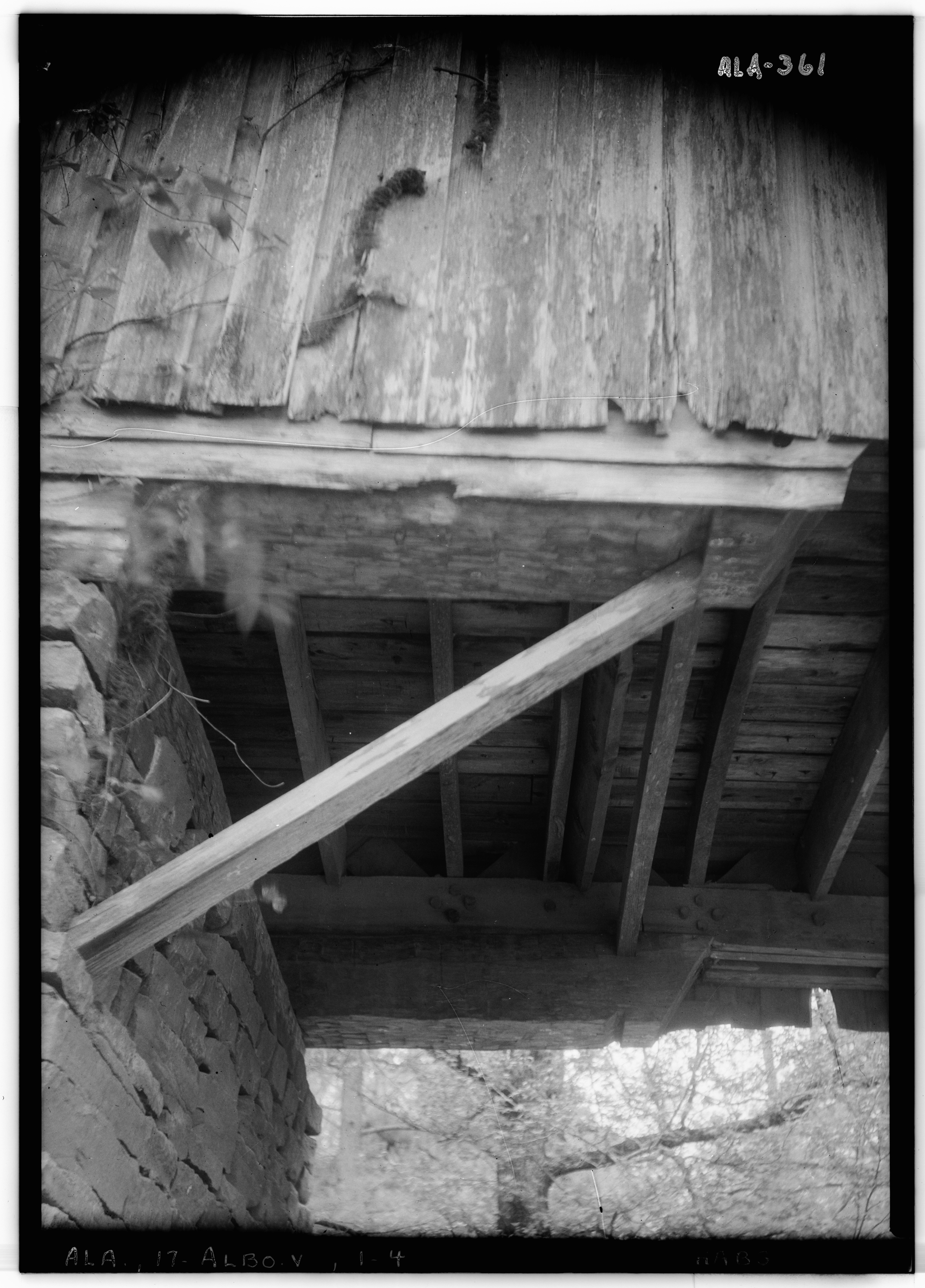
Foundation on south end of bridge

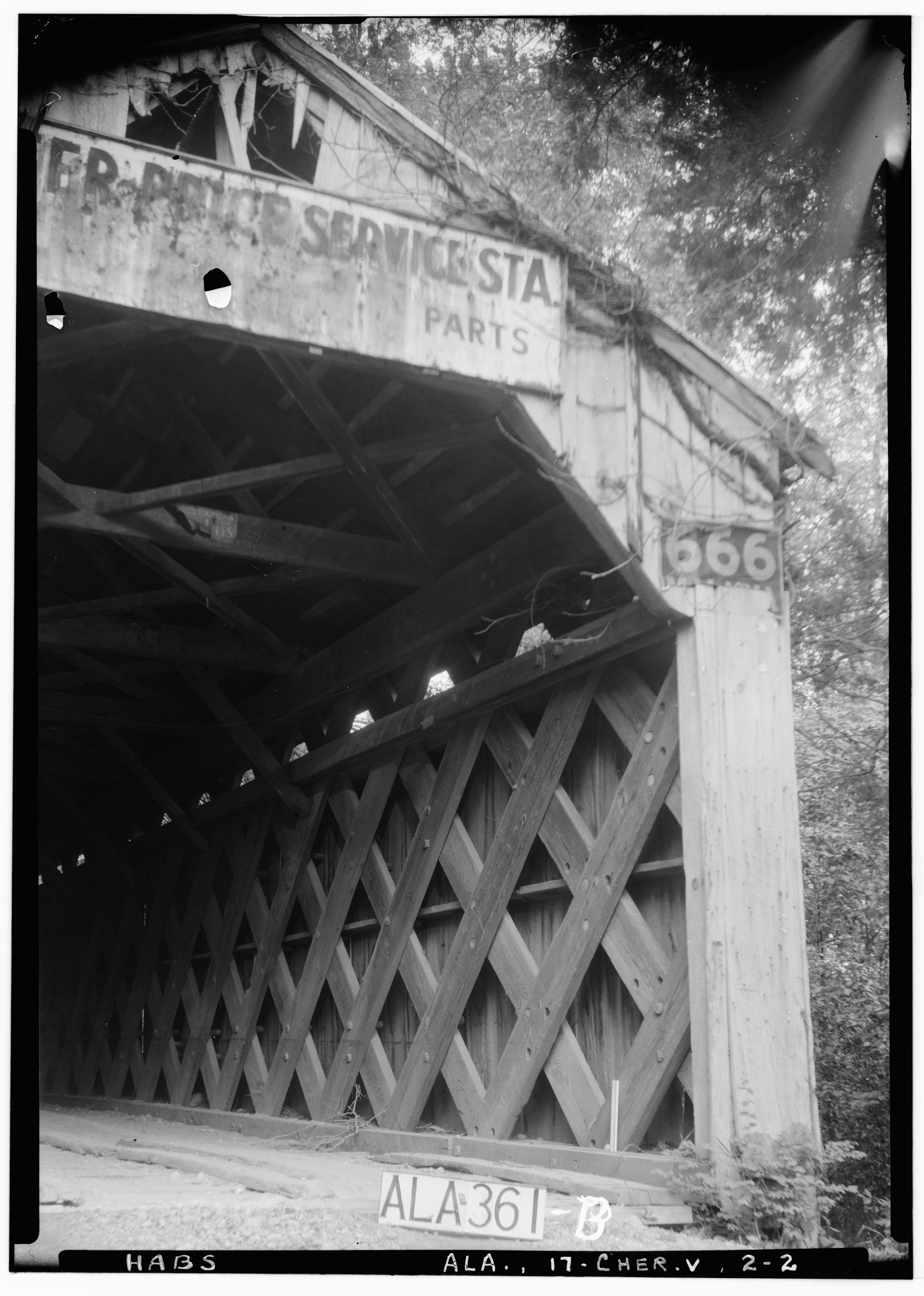
West end of Buzzard Roost Covered Bridge
