= Berlin, Alabama =

- Town
- Seal

- Location in Alabama
- Coordinates: 34°11′05″N 86°45′15″W
- Country: United States
- State: Alabama
- County: Cullman
- Incorporated: 2018

Government
  - Type: Mayor-council government

Area
  - Total: 1.419 sq mi (3.675 km^{2})
  - Land: 1.415 sq mi (3.665 km^{2})
  - Water: 0.0042 sq mi (0.011 km^{2})
- Elevation: 810 ft (250 m)

Population (2020)
  - Total: 476
  - Estimate (2022): 506
  - Density: 372/sq mi (143.6/km^{2})
- Time zone: UTC−6 (Central (CST))
  - Summer (DST): UTC−5 (CDT)
- ZIP Code: 35058
- Area codes: 256 and 938
- FIPS code: 01-05812
- GNIS feature ID: 2797102
- Website: berlinal.gov

Berlin is a town in Cullman County, Alabama, United States. The population was 476 at the 2020 census. It is located roughly five miles east of the city of Cullman in northern Alabama. U.S. Route 278 and Cullman County Road 747 intersect at Walker's Corner, considered to be the center of Berlin. The Berlin Community Center is located on U.S. Route 278, just west of the crossroads.

== History ==
The town was originally known as Hobart, possibly named after Garret Hobart, a New Jersey Congressman who served as vice-president under William McKinley. A post office was established in the town in 1895, but was closed in 1903. The name was changed circa 1914 to honor the capital of Germany, the former homeland of many of the town's ethnic German residents. The new name was selected by John (Kritner) Kreitner. The town was incorporated in 2018.

The historic Lidy Walker Covered Bridge was located just north of Berlin at the farm of Winford I. "Lidy" Walker on Lidy's Lake from 1958 until its collapse in 2001. Originally called the Big Branch Covered Bridge, it was built near Blountsville in Blount County in 1926 and moved to Berlin 32 years later.

Residents of Berlin voted 45-23 to incorporate in 2018.

== Geography ==
According to the United States Census Bureau, the town has a total area of 1.419 square miles (3.68 km^{2}), of which 1.415 square miles (3.66 km^{2}) is land and 0.004 square miles (0.010 km^{2}), is water.

== Demographics ==
Historical population
Census	Pop.	Note	%±
2020	476		—
2022 (est.)	506	▲	6.3%
U.S. Decennial Census; 2020 Census

=== 2020 census ===
Triana racial composition
Race	Number	Percent
White (non-Hispanic)	382	%
Black or African American (non-Hispanic)	3	%
Native American	4	%
Asian	0	0.00%
Pacific Islander	1	%
Other/Mixed	19	%
Hispanic or Latino	67	%

As of the 2020 census, there were 476 people, 191 households, and 142 families residing in the town. There were 206 housing units.

== Education ==
Berlin is in the Cullman County School District.
