= Trimble, Alabama =

Unincorporated community in Alabama, United States

Trimble
- Unincorporated community
- Trimble's location in Alabama.
- Coordinates: 34°05′36″N 86°56′55″W
- Country: United States
- State: Alabama
- County: Cullman
- Elevation: 525 ft (160 m)
- Time zone: UTC-6 (Central (CST))
  - Summer (DST): UTC-5 (CDT)
- GNIS feature ID: 153718

Trimble, also known as Trimble Town or Burch, is an unincorporated community in Cullman County, Alabama, United States.

== History ==
Trimble is named after its first postmaster, William Trimble. A post office operated under the name Trimble from 1886 to 1905.
