= Tallasseehatchee Creek =

Stream in Alabama

Coordinates: 33°46′49″N 85°59′53″W

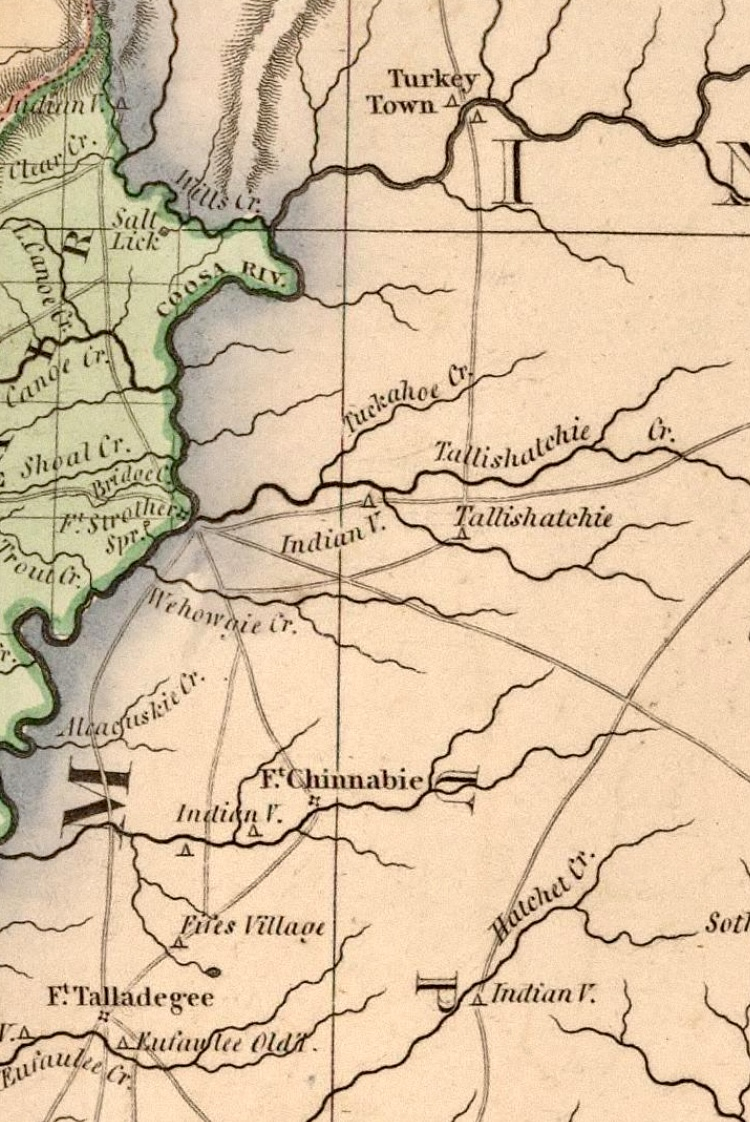
Alabama–Georgia map dated c. 1825 from Tanner's atlas showing "Indian villages" and land routes near Tallishatchie Creek

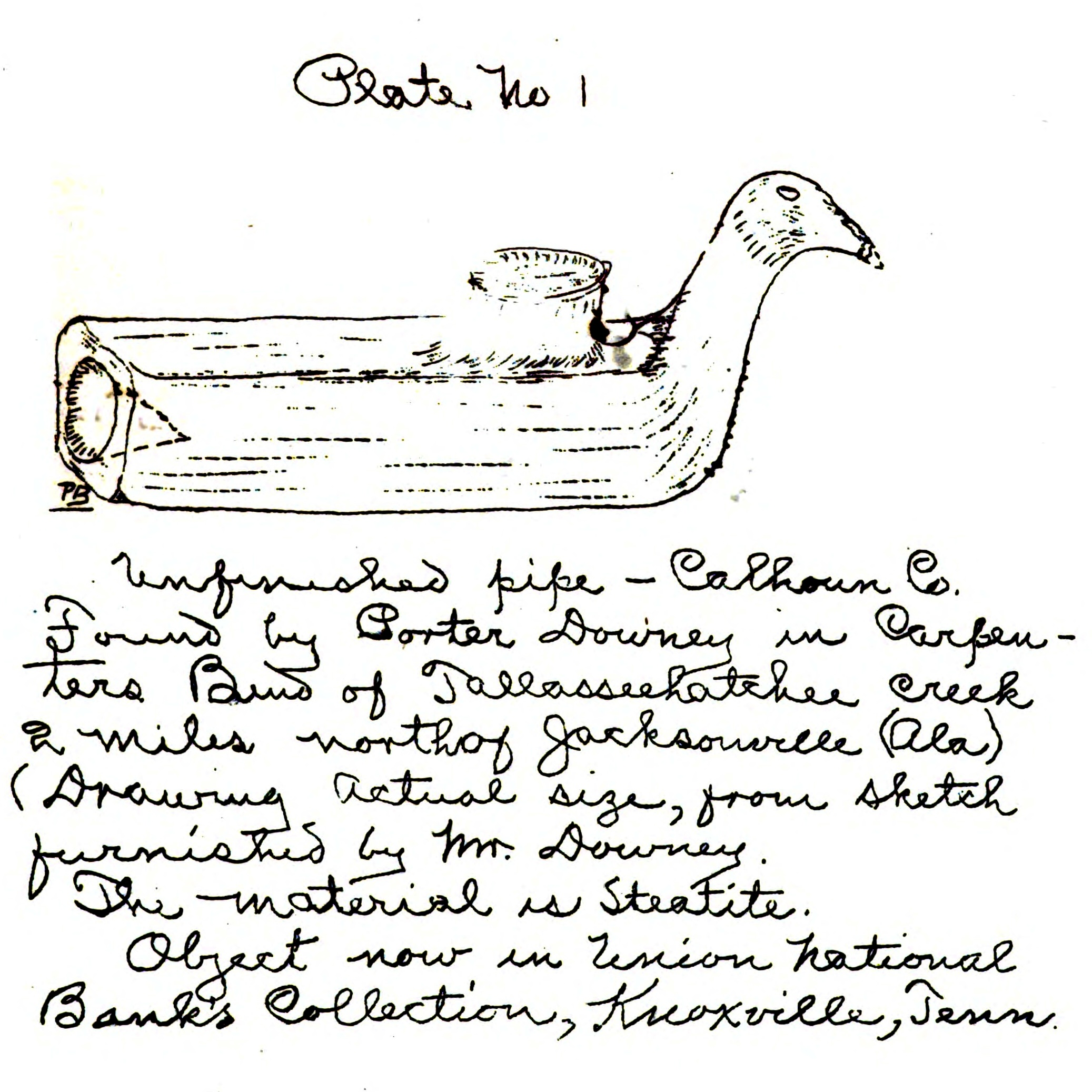
Drawing of unfinished bird pipe made of steatite, found at Carpenter's Bend, Tallasseehatchee Creek

Tallasseehatchee Creek is a stream near Jacksonville, in Calhoun County, eastern Alabama, United States. It is a tributary to the Coosa River. Tallasseehatchee Creek is about 25 miles (40 km) long, and flows southwest to Ohatchee Creek. Little Tallasseehatchee Creek, which is about 8 miles (13 km) long, flows northwest to Tallasseehatchee Creek on the west side of Jacksonville. Deprecated spellings include Tallahatchee Creek, Tallasahatchee Creek, and Tallaseehatchee Creek. According to the Geographical Survey of Alabama, "Tallasseehatchee Creek is more mineralized than most streams in the Coosa River basin. The water is hard but contains almost no color."

There are historic shell mounds along the creek. In 1560 Spanish troops under Tristán de Luna y Arellano began an expedition against the Napochie people from a location between Talladega Creek and Tallasseehatchee Creek. It is notable as the site of a Muscogee tribal town destroyed at the Battle of Tallushatchee in 1813.

Tallasseehatchee Creek could potentially support a population of the endemic Alabama live-bearing snail (Tulotoma magnifica) as surveys identified a population in nearby Ohatchee Creek in 1990, but no specimens of the snail were found during a 2003 survey by malacologists.
