= Nixburg, Alabama =

- Census-designated place
- Location within Alabama Location within the United States
- Coordinates: 32°52′18″N 86°05′58″W
- Country: United States
- State: Alabama
- County: Coosa

Area
  - Total: 7.47 sq mi (19.35 km^{2})
  - Land: 7.46 sq mi (19.33 km^{2})
  - Water: 0.012 sq mi (0.03 km^{2})
- Elevation: 732 ft (223 m)

Population (2020)
  - Total: 329
  - Density: 44.1/sq mi (17.02/km^{2})
- Time zone: UTC-6 (Central (CST))
  - Summer (DST): UTC-5 (CDT)
- Area codes: 256 & 938, 334
- GNIS feature ID: 2805891

Nixburg is a census-designated place in Coosa County, Alabama, United States. As of the 2020 census, Nixburg had a population of 329.

== History ==
Nixburg was established by 1850 by Solomon Robbins, who moved there from North Carolina, and was originally called Robbinsville. It was later renamed Nixburg in honor of the Nix family, who were early settlers of the area. Its post office was established in 1836 and closed in 1978. The Oakachoy Covered Bridge, which was formerly listed on the National Register of Historic Places and the Alabama Register of Landmarks and Heritage, was located in Nixburg. The bridge was destroyed by vandals on June 2, 2001. The Old Shiloh Cemetery, also located in Nixburg, is listed on the Alabama Register of Landmarks and Heritage.

== Demographics ==
It was first named as a CDP in the 2020 Census which listed a population of 329.

Historical population
Census	Pop.	Note	%±
2020	329		—
U.S. Decennial Census; 2020

=== 2020 census ===
Nixburg CDP, Alabama – Racial and ethnic composition Note: the US Census treats Hispanic/Latino as an ethnic category. This table excludes Latinos from the racial categories and assigns them to a separate category. Hispanics/Latinos may be of any race.
Race / Ethnicity (NH = Non-Hispanic)	Pop 2020	% 2020
White alone (NH)	93	28.27%
Black or African American alone (NH)	220	66.87%
Native American or Alaska Native alone (NH)	0	0.00%
Asian alone (NH)	0	0.00%
Native Hawaiian or Pacific Islander alone (NH)	0	0.00%
Other race alone (NH)	3	0.91%
Mixed race or Multiracial (NH)	12	3.65%
Hispanic or Latino (any race)	1	0.30%
Total	329	100.00%

== Notable people ==
- Leven H. Ellis, 15th Lieutenant Governor of Alabama from 1943 to 1947
- William Garrett, former Alabama Speaker of the House, Alabama State Senator.
