= Clarkson–Legg Covered Bridge =

Clarkson–Legg CB
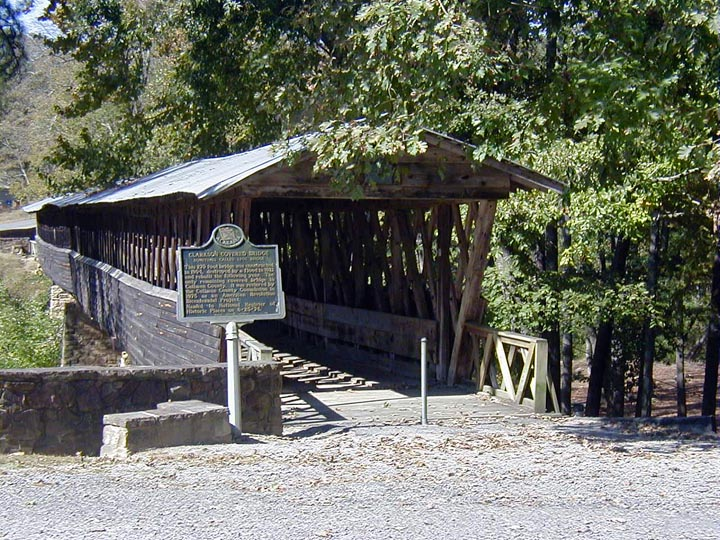
- The Clarkson–Legg Covered Bridge near Cullman, Alabama.
- Coordinates: 34°12′27.08″N 86°59′27.35″W
- Carries: pedestrian traffic (vehicles until 1962)
- Crosses: Crooked Creek
- Locale: Bethel, Alabama
- Maintained by: Cullman County Commission
- ID number: 01-22-01 (WGCB)

Characteristics
- Design: Town lattice truss bridge
- Total length: 270 ft (82 m)

History
- Construction end: 1904
- Clarkson Bridge
- U.S. National Register of Historic Places
- Area: 1 acre (0.4 ha)
- Architectural style: Two Span Town Truss
- NRHP reference No.: 74000408
- Added to NRHP: June 25, 1974

Location
- Interactive map of Clarkson–Legg CB

The Clarkson–Legg Covered Bridge, more simply known as Clarkson Covered Bridge, is a county-owned wooden covered bridge that spans Crooked Creek in Cullman County, Alabama, United States. It is located at Clarkson Covered Bridge Park on County Road 1043 (CR 1043) off U.S. Route 278 near the community of Bethel, about 8 mi (13 km) west of Cullman.

Originally built in 1904, the 270-foot (82 m) bridge (although some other sources say the bridge is only 250 ft long) is a Town lattice truss construction over four spans. The Clarkson–Legg Covered Bridge was listed on the National Register of Historic Places on June 25, 1974. It is currently the second longest existing historic covered bridge in Alabama and third longest overall in the state after the 334-foot (102 m) Twin Creek Covered Bridge in Midway, Alabama and 324-foot (99 m) Swann Covered Bridge in Cleveland, Alabama. The bridge is maintained by the Cullman County Commission.

== History ==
The Clarkson–Legg Covered Bridge was constructed over Crooked Creek in 1904 on property owned by local mail carrier James W. Legg at the cost of $1,500. It was originally named the Legg Covered Bridge after the landowner, who saw the need for transportation improvement in the area and even supplied much of the materials. A flood destroyed half of the bridge in 1921. Most of the pieces were recovered downstream, and the bridge was able to be rebuilt the following year, with help from a contractor hired by Cullman County, also at a cost of $1,500. The covered bridge remained in service to motor traffic until 1962, when it was bypassed by a nearby concrete bridge. As part of the American Bicentennial Project, the Clarkson–Legg Covered Bridge was restored by the Cullman County Commission in 1975, along with a gristmill and log cabin also located at Clarkson Covered Bridge Park. A number of activities are now held at the park, including an annual event by the county called Old-Fashioned Days.

On Christmas Day of 2015, many of the paths and walkways within Clarkson Covered Bridge Park were damaged due to flooding after 8 in (20 cm) of rain fell in a 24-hour period. The covered bridge itself was unharmed. Although the flood was not as significant as the one which occurred in 1921, it did require the park to be closed to the public while repairs were made. The park reopened on January 13, 2016.

== Civil War events ==
During the American Civil War, skirmishes at Crooked Creek and Hog Mountain occurred on April 30, 1863, in the vicinity of where the Clarkson–Legg Covered Bridge currently stands. It was part of a series of engagements which took place throughout Cullman County that day as a band of men led by Union Army Colonel Abel Streight were being pursued by forces led by Confederate Army General Nathan Bedford Forrest. This was due to a result of a failed attempt (later known as Streight's Raid) by Colonel Streight's group to cut off the Western & Atlantic Railroad, in Middle Tennessee, which was supplying Confederate Army forces commanded by General Braxton Bragg.

== See also ==
- List of Alabama covered bridges
