= Nances Creek, Alabama =

- Census-designated place
- Location of Nances Creek in Calhoun County, Alabama.
- Coordinates: 33°52′02″N 85°39′40″W
- Country: United States
- State: Alabama
- County: Calhoun

Area
  - Total: 5.81 sq mi (15.06 km^{2})
  - Land: 5.81 sq mi (15.04 km^{2})
  - Water: 0.0077 sq mi (0.02 km^{2})
- Elevation: 883 ft (269 m)

Population (2020)
  - Total: 399
  - Density: 68.7/sq mi (26.53/km^{2})
- Time zone: UTC-6 (Central (CST))
  - Summer (DST): UTC-5 (CDT)
- Area codes: 256 & 938
- GNIS feature ID: 2582690

Nances Creek is a census-designated place and unincorporated community in Calhoun County, Alabama, United States. As of the 2020 census, Nances Creek had a population of 399.

== Demographics ==
Historical population
Census	Pop.	Note	%±
2010	407		—
2020	399		−2.0%
U.S. Decennial Census

Nances Creek was first listed as a census designated place in the 2010 U.S. census.

Nances Creek CDP, Alabama – Racial and ethnic composition Note: the US Census treats Hispanic/Latino as an ethnic category. This table excludes Latinos from the racial categories and assigns them to a separate category. Hispanics/Latinos may be of any race.
Race / Ethnicity (NH = Non-Hispanic)	Pop 2010	Pop 2020	% 2010	% 2020
White alone (NH)	400	381	98.28%	95.49%
Black or African American alone (NH)	0	2	0.00%	0.50%
Native American or Alaska Native alone (NH)	1	0	0.25%	0.00%
Asian alone (NH)	0	2	0.00%	0.50%
Native Hawaiian or Pacific Islander alone (NH)	0	0	0.00%	0.00%
Other race alone (NH)	0	0	0.00%	0.00%
Mixed race or Multiracial (NH)	3	6	0.74%	1.50%
Hispanic or Latino (any race)	3	8	0.74%	2.01%
Total	407	399	100.00%	100.00%
