= Nectar, Alabama =

- Town
- Location of Nectar in Blount County, Alabama.
- Coordinates: 33°58′04″N 86°37′43″W
- Country: United States
- State: Alabama
- County: Blount

Area
  - Total: 1.83 sq mi (4.73 km^{2})
  - Land: 1.81 sq mi (4.69 km^{2})
  - Water: 0.015 sq mi (0.04 km^{2})
- Elevation: 522 ft (159 m)

Population (2020)
  - Total: 379
  - Density: 209.2/sq mi (80.79/km^{2})
- Time zone: UTC-6 (Central (CST))
  - Summer (DST): UTC-5 (CDT)
- FIPS code: 01-53448
- GNIS feature ID: 2406969
- Website: https://www.townofnectar.com/

Nectar is a town in Blount County, Alabama, United States. At the 2020 census, the population was 379.

== Geography ==
Nectar is located in central Blount County in the valley of the Locust Fork of the Black Warrior River. Alabama State Route 160 passes through the center of the town, leading northeast 4 miles (6 km) to Cleveland and southwest 14 miles (23 km) to Interstate 65 near Warrior.

According to the U.S. Census Bureau, the town has a total area of 1.8 square miles (4.7 km^{2}), of which 0.015 square miles (0.04 km^{2}), or 0.76%, is water.

== Demographics ==
Historical population
Census	Pop.	Note	%±
1980	367		—
1990	238		−35.1%
2000	372		56.3%
2010	345		−7.3%
2020	379		9.9%
U.S. Decennial Census; 2013 Estimate

As of the census of 2000, there were 372 people, 141 households, and 110 families residing in the town. The population density was 204.8 inhabitants per square mile (79.1/km^{2}). There were 158 housing units at an average density of 87.0 per square mile (33.6/km^{2}). The racial makeup of the town was: 362 people (97.31%) reported as White, 7 people (1.88%) reported as other races, and 3 people (0.81%) reported as two or more races. 10 people (2.69% of the population) were Hispanic or Latino of any race.

There were 141 households, out of which 56 (39.7%) had children under the age of 18 living with them, 97 (68.8%) were married couples living together, 10 (7.1%) had a female householder with no husband present, and 30 (21.3%) were non-families. 27 households (19.1%) were made up of individuals, and 13 households (9.2%) had someone living alone who was 65 years of age or older. The average household size was 2.64 and the average family size was 3.02.

In the town, the age distribution of the population shows 25.3% under the age of 18, 10.2% from 18 to 24, 26.9% from 25 to 44, 26.9% from 45 to 64, and 10.8% who were 65 years of age or older. The median age was 37 years. For every 100 females, there were 103.3 males. For every 100 females age 18 and over, there were 112.2 males.

The median income for a household in the town was $44,167, and the median income for a family was $49,250. Males had a median income of $31,563 versus $24,583 for females. The per capita income for the town was $16,408. About 14.0% of families and 11.5% of the population were below the poverty line, including 18.0% of those under age 18 and 13.2% of those age 65 or over.
