= World Guide to Covered Bridges =

Covered bridge numbering system

The World Guide to Covered Bridges is published by the National Society for the Preservation of Covered Bridges (NSPCB). It uses a covered bridge numbering system developed by John Diehl, the chairman of the Ohio Covered Bridge Committee. The committee first used the numbering system in 1953 to publish a list of covered bridges in Ohio.

The National Society for the Preservation of Covered Bridges has produced eight editions of this book. The first edition was titled Guide to Covered Bridges of the United States. Later editions have all been titled World Guide to Covered Bridges.

World Guide editions
| Edition | Issue year | Editor(s) |
|---|---|---|
| 1 | 1956 | Betsy and Philip Clough |
| 2 | 1959 | Betsy and Philip Clough |
| 3 | 1965 | Harold F. Eastman |
| 4 | 1972 | Oscar F. Lane |
| 5 | 1980 | Richard T. Donovan |
| 6 | 1989 | Bill Heisel |
| 7 | 2009 | David W. Wright |
| 8 | 2021 | William S. Caswell, Jr. |

Updates to the 2021 edition are available as a PDF file.
