= Titletown High =

- Genre: Reality television
- Starring: Samuel Brown; Jake Garcia; Lenley Gross; Kendall Haden; Amari Jones; Grayson Leavy; Jeff Kent; Morgan Miller; Jacarrius Peak; Rush Propst; Ella Sefa; Kaili Spells; Malia Spells; Zoey Watson
- Country of origin: United States
- No. of seasons: 1
- No. of episodes: 8

Production
- Executive producers: Jason Sciavicco; Lamar Damon
- Cinematography: Eric Dodson
- Running time: 30 to 36 minutes

Original release
- Network: Netflix
- Release: August 27, 2021

Titletown High is a Netflix reality show that explores the lives of teens at Valdosta High School in Valdosta, Georgia as they strive for a balance between athletics, academics, and relationships. It focuses on the members of the school's Valdosta Wildcats football team during the 2020 season, their first under the leadership of head coach Rush Propst.

The show became available to stream on August 27, 2021.

== Episodes ==
No.	Title	Original release date
1	"Are We Official?"	August 27, 2021
2	"We've Got a Problem"	August 27, 2021
3	"Winnersville"	August 27, 2021
4	"I’m Not Distracted"	August 27, 2021
5	"Out For Blood"	August 27, 2021
6	"Your Last Shot"	August 27, 2021
7	"Seize the Moment"	August 27, 2021
8	"It's All About Your Legacy"	August 27, 2021

== See also ==
- Two-A-Days
