= Rush Propst =

American football player and coach (born 1957)

Biographical details
- Born: December 1957 (age 68); Ohatchee, Alabama

Playing career
- 1977–1978: Jacksonville State

Coaching career (HC unless noted)
- 1989–1993: Ashville HS (AL)
- 1994–1996: Eufaula HS (AL)
- 1997: Alba HS (AL)
- 1998: Alma Bryant HS (AL)
- 1999–2007: Hoover HS (AL)
- 2008–2018: Colquitt County HS (GA)
- 2019: UAB (volunteer consultant)
- 2020: Valdosta HS (GA)
- 2023: Coosa Christian School (AL) (associate)
- 2023: Pell City HS (AL)
- 2025: Coosa Christian School (AL)

Administrative career (AD unless noted)
- 2023: Coosa Christian School (AL)

Head coaching record
- Overall: 309-119

Accomplishments and honors

Championships
- 1 National championship (2015); 5 AHSAA Class 6A (2000, 2002–2005); 1 AHSAA Class 2A (2025); 2 GHSA Class 6A (2014–2015)

Thomas Rush Propst (born December 1957) is an American football coach who currently serves as the head coach of Coosa Christian School in Gadsden, Alabama. He is also the former head coach at Valdosta High School in Valdosta, Georgia, Colquitt County High School in Moultrie, Georgia, Pell City High School in Pell City, Alabama, and Hoover High School in Hoover, Alabama. Propst gained national notoriety through the MTV series Two-A-Days, which chronicled the 2005 and 2006 seasons of his Hoover teams.

He has helped over 250 players receive college scholarships, including players such as Chad Jackson (Florida), John Parker Wilson (Alabama), Ryan Pugh (Auburn) and Cornelius Williams (Troy). At the conclusion of the 2025 season, his 33–year head coaching record stood at 309-119 (.722 win percentage).

== Personal life ==
Propst, who is of German descent, is a native of Ohatchee, Alabama where he graduated from Ohatchee High School in 1976. Propst played high school football for Coach Ragan Clark, whose son Bill was later the head coach at Prattville High School, a Hoover rival, for many years. Ohatchee was 27–5–1 in Propst's three years as a starter at wide receiver and defensive back, with Propst earning All-County recognition as a senior. In addition to football, he was a two-year starter on the basketball team and even though Ohatchee did not have a track program, he checked out of school one afternoon and won the District 100-yard dash his senior year.

Propst attended college at Jacksonville State University (JSU) where he was a non-scholarship member of the JSU football team in 1976–1977. He graduated from Jacksonville State in 1981 with a degree in Physical Education. In 1990, he married Tammy Cox, his high school sweetheart, with whom he had three children. Propst divorced Tammy in 2008 and married his current wife, Stefnie, with whom he has four children.

Ralph Clyde "Shorty" Propst, who was born in 1924 and played for the Alabama Crimson Tide, is his uncle.

== Coaching career ==
Propst took his first coaching position as a student assistant at Ohatchee in 1977, the year they won their only state championship. His brother, Philip was a star on that team. He also served as an assistant coach for eight years at Cleburne County High School in Heflin, Alabama, Cherokee High School in Centre, Alabama, and Ashville High School in Ashville, Alabama. Propst was eventually promoted to head football coach at Ashville High, serving from 1989 to 1993. He then moved on to Eufaula High School in Eufaula, Alabama from 1994 to 1996 before being hired by Alba High School in Bayou La Batre, Alabama in 1997. In 1998, Propst coached Alma Bryant High School, the school that resulted from Alba's merger with the high school in Grand Bay, Alabama. At Alma Bryant he amassed a 12–2 record.

He was hired at Hoover in 1999, where he coached for nine years, winning 110 games and five state championships. Propst's Hoover team was one of the top-ranked teams in the United States over much of the first decade of the new millennium, winning Alabama High School Athletic Association Class 6A state championships in five of the first six seasons including four consecutive titles from 2002 to 2005 (missing out on 6 straight after losses in the championship game to Daphne in 2001 and Prattville in 2006). During Propst's tenure, Hoover was repeatedly ranked in the nation's top-25 polls, finishing as the #16 team in the nation in 2003, #4 in the nation in 2004, #8 in the nation in 2005, and ranked #1 entering the 2006 season by Sports Illustrated, USA Today and the National Prep Football Poll. Propst's base salary at Hoover was $100,678.

On January 30, 2008, Propst was named head coach at Colquitt County High School. When Les Koenning left the University of South Alabama in January 2009, head coach Joey Jones interviewed Propst to fill the vacant position as the offensive coordinator. After community uproar over the interview, Propst decided to stay at Colquitt County.

In just his second year of coaching at Colquitt County, Propst took a team that had finished 2–8 in 2007 to an 11–3 season and the state semifinals in 2009. In 2010, he led Colquitt County to the GHSA Class 5A State Championship Game. In 2011, Colquitt finished 11–3 after losing 35–31 to the eventual state champions, Grayson High School, in the state semifinal game. In 2012, Colquitt finished 10–4 after losing 41–27 to the eventual state champions, Norcross High School, in the state semifinal game. In 2013, Colquitt finished 11–3 after losing 14–9 to the eventual state champions, Norcross High School, in the state semifinal game. In 2014, Rush Propst led his Colquitt County Packer football team to their second undefeated season (15–0) and a second state title (first one came in 1994), by defeating Archer High School 28–24 on December 13, 2014, to claim the 2014 1-AAAAAA State Championship and his first state title within Georgia. In 2015, Colquitt County completed another 15–0 season with a 30–13 victory over the Roswell Hornets to claim their second consecutive Georgia AAAAAA State Championship. Propst was relieved of coaching duties following the 2018 season. He spent a year as a volunteer assistant coach at UAB.

In December 2025, Prost won his first state championship in Alabama in 20 years when he led Coosa Christian to a 13-2 season and a 29-22 victory over Lanett in the Alabama Class 2A State Championship.

== Controversy ==
During his tenure at Hoover, Propst was a frequent target of critics. But in June 2007, the criticism became more vocal and more formal when HHS athletic director Jerry Browning, Propst's immediate superior, resigned over numerous differences between himself and principal Richard Bishop, who was a teammate of Propst on the football team at Jacksonville State University. Browning expressed concerns over reports that grades for certain athletes had been altered to make them eligible for college play, and made those concerns known to Hoover City Schools Superintendent Andy Craig in a meeting in April. Bishop originally announced that there was nothing to be concerned about, but Craig overruled Bishop and announced that a full investigation would be carried out, to be headed by former federal judge Sam C. Pointer, Jr.

Propst also faced charges having to do with his personal life, specifically that he engaged in extramarital affairs. The topic was the focus of considerable discussion on the Paul Finebaum syndicated sports talk radio show, where Hunter Ford, a reporter for The Hoover Gazette newspaper, reported the rumors. During those discussions, Ford was fired, live and on the air, by Gazette general manager John Junkin. (Ironically, Ford had previously advocated in a Gazette column that Propst be hired to fill the then-vacant head coach position at the University of Alabama at Birmingham). The Gazette went out of business about five weeks later.

Ford, was then hired by editor Dale Jones of The Western Star in nearby Bessemer, after his firing from The Hoover Gazette. In his column in the edition of July 4, 2007, of The Western Star, Ford reported that a number of sources, none of which would allow their name to be used, said that Propst's alleged affair also included a child born out of wedlock. The following week, Tribble Publications in Warm Springs, Georgia, the parent company who owns The Western Star, printed an apology for allowing Ford to print these allegations in their paper, though it did not specifically retract the charges. Jones insisted that the apology was unwarranted, saying that Ford's story was solid and that the evidence was irrefutable. Propst continued to deny the allegations.

But on July 28, 2007, The Birmingham News went public with the allegations when it published a letter from attorneys for Bishop to the Hoover Board of Education. The letter was a result of the board voting to not renew Bishop's contract as principal, an act which garnered widespread coverage by local news media. In the letter by Bishop's attorneys, which The News obtained through a public-records request, the attorneys state that Browning told Bishop that Propst "had a separate family and led a completely separate life," and that Bishop was told by Craig not to investigate the matter.

Pointer completed his investigation in late September, and after considerable debate over several sessions (and public pressure from numerous public figures, including Hoover Mayor Tony Petelos), the Hoover Board of Education voted 4–1 to release the report through several sources. Among the findings were that Propst's bank records indicated support for a "second family" in Pell City, Alabama, but the incidents regarding grade-changing were largely caused by an assistant principal and an administrator.

Propst came under further scrutiny when Hanceville High School complained to the Alabama High School Athletic Association that a former player of theirs, Tristan Purifoy, did not transfer properly to Hoover High and was therefore ineligible. On October 23, 2007, the AHSAA ruled that Purifoy was indeed ineligible, and that the Bucs would have to forfeit all games in which Purifoy played. The investigation resulted in the forfeiture of four games, including a 1–0 loss to crosstown rival Spain Park High School, the first loss to the Jaguars in the history of the teams' rivalry. Purifoy was reinstated by the AHSAA during the playoffs that same year. Despite the forfeits, the Bucs finished the regular season with a 4–5 record and qualified for the AHSAA 6A playoffs. However, in Propst's last game as Hoover's head coach, they lost in the third round to another crosstown rival, Vestavia Hills, 21–17, a game considered by many Alabama sportswriters to be the biggest rivalry in the state. His team finished the season with an on-field record of 10–2 (6–6 including the four forfeit losses).

=== Resignation from Hoover High School ===
At a special meeting of the Hoover Board of Education on October 30, 2007, Propst announced that he would resign, but would continue to coach the team as far as they progress in the 2007 playoffs. In a 30-minute address to the board and a large crowd inside the board chambers, Propst tearfully admitted to a relationship outside his marriage and a child as a result of that relationship, but no other wrongdoing. "I am remorseful for what I have done. I have failed you as a community. I have failed you as a board, and especially I have failed you (Superintendent) Andy (Craig)," Propst said. "I made mistakes. I could have done things differently, but I don't admit wrongdoing inside the walls of Hoover High School."

=== Head-butting player ===
In June 2016, the Georgia Professional Standards Commission announced that Propst would be suspended for the entire 2016 season after head-butting one of his players (and bloodying himself) during a December 4, 2015 playoff game. He appealed and was instead given a reprimand.

=== Dismissal from Colquitt County High School and subsequent vindication ===
On March 14, 2019, Propst was relieved of his duties as the high school's head football coach in a unanimous vote by the Colquitt County Board of Education. His dismissal followed an investigation that determined he had violated the Code of Ethics for Educators for (1) legal compliance, (2) conduct with students, (3) honesty, and (4) public funds and property, including giving Aleve pills to students "on more than one occasion" and owing nearly $450,000 in delinquent federal and state taxes. The PSC investigation into Propst (case February 19, 1025) was settled with a 131-day suspension. In In March 2020, Rush Propst was cleared of all the accusations of wrongdoing advanced by the Colquitt County Superintendent Doug Howell and had his Georgia teaching certificate reinstated. Howell announced his resignation in the months ahead.

=== Sanctions imposed against Valdosta High School ===
On April 8, 2021, the Valdosta High School football team was sanctioned due to recruiting and undue influence committed by Propst and the Valdosta booster club. Five players were declared ineligible for the athletic year, along with $5,000 in fines. The Valdosta football team was also placed on probation for the 2021 football season, therefore preventing them from participating in any playoff games. Any games that the five players played in were forfeited.

=== Pell City High School ===
On April 24, 2024, the Pell City Board of Education called a special meeting to vote on terminating Propst's contract. However, no vote was taken as no member of the board seconded the motion. On May 3, 2024, Rush Propst announced his resignation as Pell City's head football coach.

== Tennessee Two-A-Days ==
During the 2019 football season, Propst co-hosted Tennessee Two-A-Days, a radio show on Fox Sports Knoxville.
