= Hoover City Schools =

School district in Alabama, United States

Location
- Hoover, Alabama United States
- Coordinates: 33.4073°N 86.7661°W

District information
- Type: Public
- Motto: "Learning for Life"
- Grades: K–12
- Established: 1987
- Superintendent: Dr. Kevin Maddox
- Schools: 18
- Budget: $167.8 million

Students and staff
- Students: 13,567
- Teachers: 1,000 (approximate)
- Staff: 850(approximate)

Other information
- Website: www.hoovercityschools.net

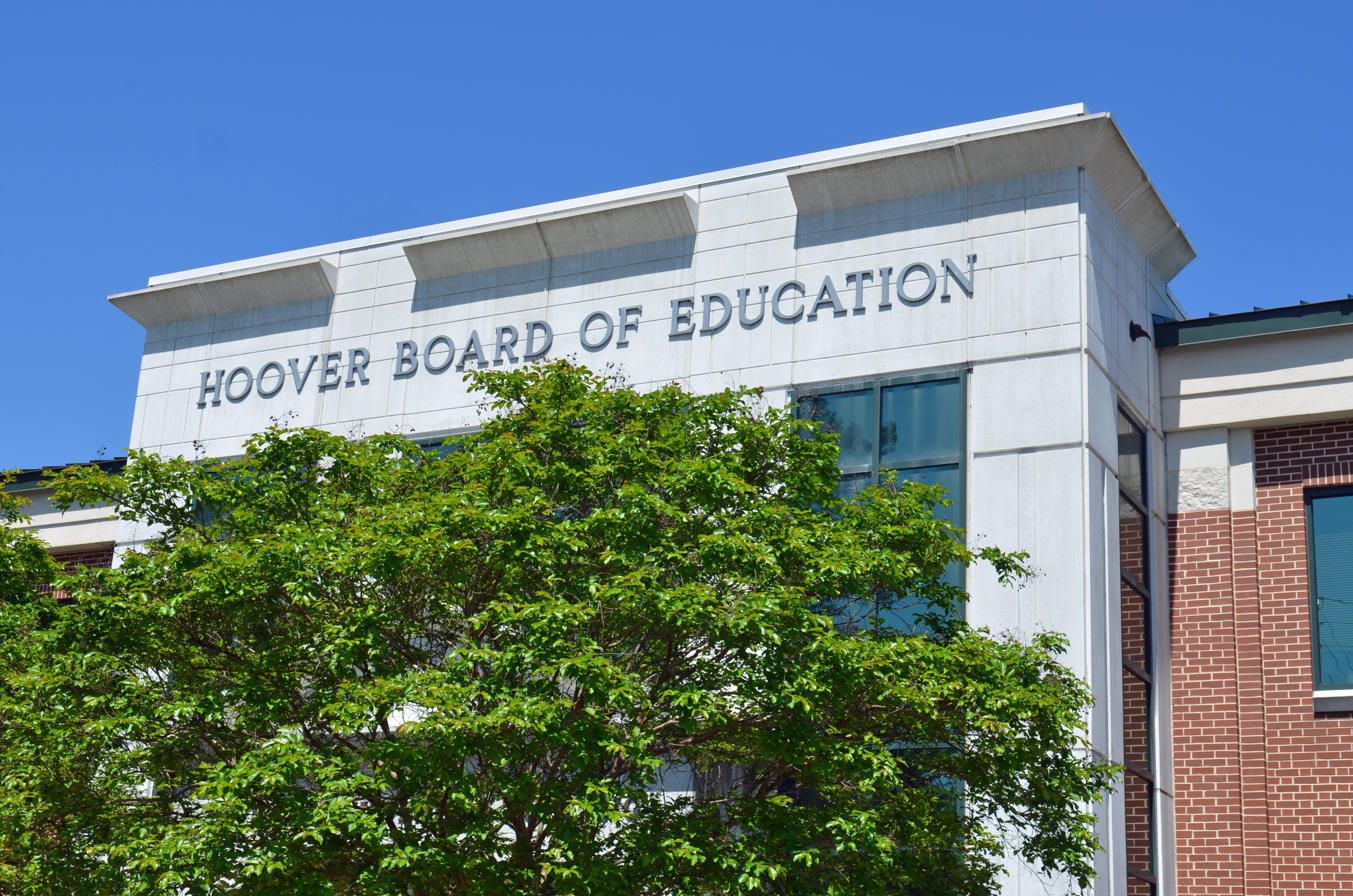
Farr Administration Building/Hoover Board of Education. Main administrative building for Hoover City Schools.

Hoover City Schools is the public school system serving the city of Hoover, Alabama within the Birmingham, Alabama, metropolitan area. Seventeen schools comprise the 55 square-mile system: 10 elementary schools, three middle schools, one intermediate school and two high schools. A five-member Board of Education, appointed by the Hoover City Council, acts as the governing body of the school system. Hoover City Schools has more National Board-Certified Teachers than any other system in Alabama; more Alabama Teachers of the Year than any other system in Alabama; and ACT scores above state and national averages. The system has a strong focus on instructional technology and maintains safe, clean facilities. The system has consistently grown in student population since its inception in the late 1980s.

== History ==
The school system was officially chartered in 1987, breaking away from the Jefferson County School System/Jefferson County Board of Education. The first school year for Hoover City Schools was 1988–1989. Hoover City Schools started with five elementary schools (Bluff Park, Shades Mountain, Rocky Ridge, Gwin and Green Valley), one middle school (Simmons), and one high school (W.A. Berry).

The first Superintendent of Hoover City Schools was Dr. Robert Mitchell. He was recruited from Virginia to come to Alabama to help lead the formation of Hoover City Schools.

== Schools ==
=== High schools ===
- Hoover High School
- Spain Park High School
- Riverchase Career Connection Center
- Crossroads School

=== Middle schools ===
- Berry Middle School
- R.F. Bumpus Middle School
- Simmons Middle School

=== Intermediate school ===
- Brock's Gap Intermediate School

=== Elementary schools ===
- Bluff Park Elementary School
- Deer Valley Elementary School
- Green Valley Elementary School
- Greystone Elementary School
- Gwin Elementary School
- Riverchase Elementary School
- Rocky Ridge Elementary School
- Shades Mountain Elementary School
- South Shades Crest Elementary School
- Trace Crossings Elementary School

== Awards ==
Safest School District in Alabama/Niche Rankings Best School Districts in Alabama/Niche Rankings Best Places to Teach in Alabama/Niche Rankings Best Districts for College Readiness/Niche Rankings Elementary Schools - Best Teachers in Alabama/Niche Rankings Best Communities for Music Education/NAMM Foundation Highest Percentage of National Board-Certified Teachers/Alabama Highest Number of JSU Teacher Hall of Fame Inductees/Alabama U.S. News & World Report Best High Schools - Hoover High School Newsweek Best High Schools - Spain Park High School

== Athletics ==
Hoover High School's teams are known as the Buccaneers, or the Bucs, and Spain Park's are known as the Jaguars, or Jags. MTV's reality series from the mid-2000sTwo-A-Days showcased Hoover High School's nationally ranked football program. Hoover High has won more than 50 athletic championships since 2000.

Spain Park High School opened in 2001; since then, it has enjoyed multiple athletic championships of its own across several sports.
