= 2A3 =

2A3 may refer to:

- 2A3 Kondensator 2P, a Soviet self-propelled Howitzer
- Larsen Bay Airport, Alaska — FAA LID code: 2A3
- Bessemer Airport, Alabama — former FAA LID code: 2A3
- a Power triode commonly used in Single-ended triode (SET) amplifiers
