= Eric Adams (disambiguation) =

Eric Adams (born 1960) was the 111th mayor of New York City.

Eric Adams may also refer to:

- Eric Adams (basketball) (born 1995), American basketball player
- Eric Adams (musician) (born 1952), American heavy metal singer
