= Jake Garcia (American football) =

American football player (born 2001)

No. 11 – Furman Paladins
- Position: Quarterback
- Class: Fifth Year

Personal information
- Born: October 20, 2001 (age 25)
- Listed height: 6 ft 2 in (1.88 m)
- Listed weight: 210 lb (95 kg)

Career information
- High school: Grayson (Loganville, Georgia)
- College: Miami (FL) (2021–2022); Missouri (2023); East Carolina (2024); Michigan (2025); Furman (2026–present)
- Stats at ESPN

Jake Garcia (born October 20, 2001) is an American college football quarterback for the Furman Paladins. He previously played for the Miami Hurricanes, Missouri Tigers, East Carolina Pirates, and Michigan Wolverines.

== Early life ==
Garcia, a native of Whittier, California, began his high school career at Long Beach Polytechnic High School before transferring to Narbonne High School. As a junior at Narbonne, he threw for 2,301 yards and 25 touchdowns. Entering his senior year, Garcia transferred to La Habra High School in La Habra, California. However, after the California high school football season was delayed until December, he moved across the country to enroll at Valdosta High School in Valdosta, Georgia. To meet the GHSA's transfer requirements, Garcia's parents were required to legally separate. He played in only one game for Valdosta before being ruled ineligible by the GHSA. Following the ruling, Garcia transferred to Grayson High School in Loganville, Georgia. He finished his senior season at Grayson, throwing for 1,237 yards and 14 touchdowns and leading the team to a state championship. In the state championship game, Garcia completed 10 passes for 136 yards and two touchdowns as Grayson defeated Collins Hill High School 38–14. Following his graduation, he committed to play college football at the University of Miami over offers from Arkansas and Florida State.

== College career ==
Garcia made his collegiate debut against Central Connecticut in 2021, throwing for 147 yards and two touchdowns in his only appearance of the season. He entered the 2022 season as the backup to Tyler Van Dyke. Following a shoulder injury to Van Dyke, Garcia was named the Hurricanes' starting quarterback for their game against Virginia. In his first career start, Garcia completed 15 of 31 passes for 125 yards as Miami defeated Virginia 14–12 in four overtimes. He finished the 2022 season appearing in eight games and throwing for 803 yards, five touchdowns, and four interceptions. Following the conclusion of the season, Garcia entered the transfer portal.

On January 20, 2023, Garcia announced his decision to transfer to the University of Missouri to play for the Missouri Tigers. Entering the 2023 season, he competed with Brady Cook and Sam Horn for the starting quarterback job, which ultimately went to Cook. After not appearing in a game for Missouri, Garcia entered the transfer portal for the second time.

On January 16, 2024, Garcia announced his decision to transfer to East Carolina University to play for the East Carolina Pirates. Entering the 2024 season, he was named the Pirates' starting quarterback. He made six starts in 2024, totaling 1,426 passing yards, eight touchdowns, and 12 interceptions. He entered the transfer portal for the third time in April 2025. In June, Garcia transferred to the University of Michigan to play for the Michigan Wolverines. After appearing in just one game for Michigan, he entered the transfer portal for the fourth time.

Garcia transferred to Furman University to play for the Furman Paladins in his final season of collegiate eligibility. He was named the Paladins' starting quarterback entering the 2026 season.

=== Statistics ===
Season	Team	Games			Passing								Rushing			
Season	Team	GP	GS	Record	Comp	Att	Pct	Yards	Avg	TD	Int	Rate	Att	Yards	Avg	TD
2021	Miami	1	0	—	11	14	78.6	147	10.5	2	0	213.9	1	45	45.0	0
2022	Miami	8	1	1–0	68	114	59.6	803	7.0	5	4	126.3	25	75	3.0	0
2023	Missouri	Did not play														
2024	East Carolina	6	6	3–3	109	181	60.2	1,426	7.9	8	12	127.7	40	46	1.1	2
2025	Michigan	1	0	—	No stats recorded											
2026	Furman	2	2	1–1	23	45	51.1	219	4.9	0	1	87.9	21	53	2.5	0
Career		18	9	5–4	211	354	59.6	2,595	7.3	15	17	125.6	87	69	0.8	2

== Personal life ==
Garcia was featured in the documentary series Titletown High.
