= Valdosta High School =

Public high school in Valdosta, Georgia, United States

Coordinates: 30.868543°N 83.233860°W

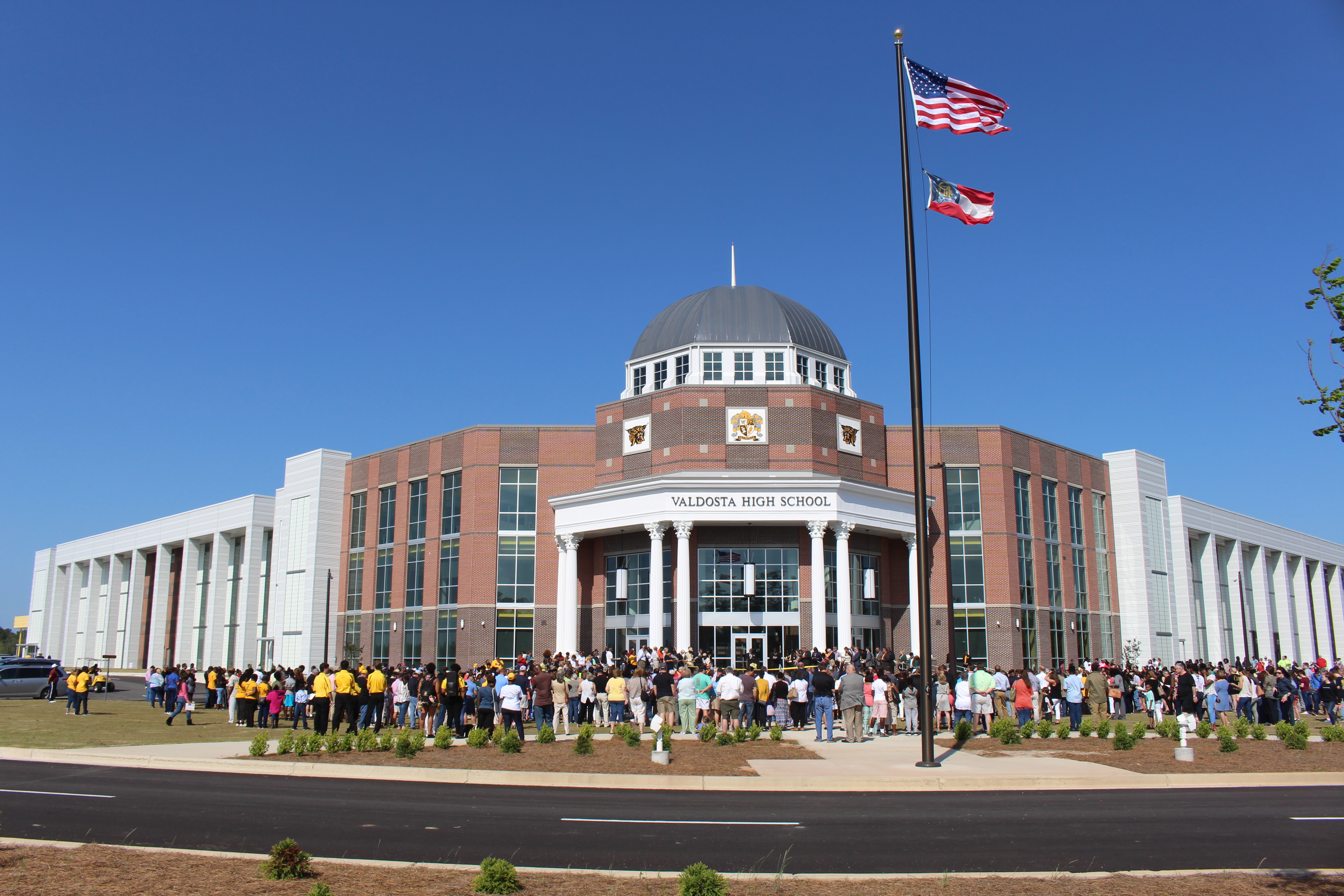
- Valdosta High School in 2018

Location
- 4590 Inner Perimeter Road; Valdosta, Georgia 31602; United States

Information
- School type: Public, high school
- School district: Valdosta City School District
- Principal: Johnnie Marshall
- Teaching staff: 144.10 (FTE)
- Grades: 9–12
- Enrollment: 2,496 (2023-2024)
- Student to teacher ratio: 17.32
- Colors: Gold and black
- Athletics: GHSA
- Athletics conference: AAAAAAA (7A) Region 1
- Mascot: Wildcat
- Rival: Lowndes High School; Colquitt County High School
- Website: gocats.org/o/vhs

Valdosta High School is a public high school located in Valdosta, Georgia, United States. It is a part of the Valdosta City School District.

The boundary of the school district (for which this is the sole comprehensive high school) is that of the city limits.

== School ==
Valdosta High School serves grades 9–12 in the Valdosta City School District.

Valdosta High School is a public school located in Valdosta, Georgia. It has 2,238 students in grades 9-12 with a student-teacher ratio of 17 to 1. According to state test scores, 28% of students are at least proficient in math and 32% in reading.

Valdosta High School is ranked 140th within Georgia. Students have the opportunity to take Advanced Placement coursework and exams. The AP participation rate at Valdosta High School is 31%. The total minority enrollment is 84%, and 95% of students are economically disadvantaged. Valdosta High School is the only high school in the Valdosta City.

Valdosta High School has a graduation rate of 90% as of 2022.

== Athletics ==
=== Football ===
Valdosta High School is home to the high school football program with the most wins in the United States, with a record 983 wins, 241 losses, and 34 ties as of the 2026 season. From 1913–2022, the Wildcats have won six national championships in football, 24 state championships, and 42 regional championships.

Valdosta High plays its home games at Bazemore-Hyder Stadium located behind Valdosta State University Campus. Cross-town rival Lowndes High School has also built a strong program, winning five state titles (1980, 1999, 2004, 2005 and 2007). Since 1968, the Wildcats' record against Lowndes County is 37–24 with 0 ties, scoring an average of 20.9 ppg as compared to Lowndes County's 10.1 ppg. The Wildcats, however, had a dry run, losing seven straight until their 21–17 come-from-behind victory in 2011.

In the summer of 2008, due in part to the successes of the Valdosta High School athletic programs, Valdosta was featured on ESPN as a candidate for TitleTown USA. This was a month-long segment on ESPN that started in the spring of 2008 and continued through July. Fans nominated towns and cities across the country based on their championship pedigree. A panel reviewed the nominees and fan voting in May determined the 20th finalist. SportsCenter visited each city in July, and fan voting July 23–27 determined the winner. On July 28, 2008, ESPN named Valdosta as Titletown, United States.

During the 2020 season, the head coach was Rush Propst, formerly at Colquitt County High School in Moultrie, Georgia and Hoover High School in Hoover, Alabama. Propst was put on probation in early 2021 for controversy about paying players for their housing costs. After determining five players were ineligible, the Georgia High School Association fined the Wildcats $7500 and banned the team from playing in the 2021 postseason. The Netflix reality television series Titletown High highlights the team's 2020 season.

The current head coach, Shelton Felton is in his second season at Valdosta. Felton went 8–2 in the regular season and 2–2 in region 1-7A with a defeat over their rivals The Lowndes High Vikings 13–6. Felton will return for the 2023–2024 football season. The season opener they will fly to Ohio to play a historical high school football game.

=== Golf ===
The boys' golf team at Valdosta High won six consecutive state championships in the 1950s. Valdosta won three state titles in Class A (1954, 1955, 1956), two in Class AA (1957, 1958), and one title in Class AAA (1959). The Valdosta High School golf team won their seventh state championship in 2014 as they claimed the Class AAAAAA title. The golf team has won eight region championships (1959, 1961, 1970, 1977, 1978, 2002, 2003, 2014).

The girls' golf team has also been region champions four times (2000, 2002, 2004, 2005).

=== Wrestling ===
Under Coach John Robbins, The Valdosta Wildcats brought home the 2018-2019 Dual and Traditional State Championships, with Freshman Noah Pettigrew winning the 195lb weight class. This is the first time in history the wrestling team has brought home a state championship in either Duals or Traditional.

=== Official GHSA state titles ===
- Baseball (1) – 1978(3A)
- Boys' Basketball (1) – 1948(B)
- Girls' Basketball (2) – 1957(2A), 1961 (3A)
- Football (22) – 1951(A), 1952(A), 1953(A), 1956(2A), 1957(2A), 1960(3A), 1961(3A), 1962(3A), 1965(3A), 1966(3A), 1968(3A), 1969(3A), 1971(3A), 1978(4A), 1982(4A), 1984(4A), 1986(4A), 1989(4A), 1990(4A), 1992(4A), 1998(4A), 2016(6A)
- Boys' Golf (6) – 1954(A), 1955(A), 1956(A), 1957(2A), 1958(2A), 1959(3A)
- Boys' Tennis (1) – 1991(4A; singles format)
- Girls' Tennis (1) – 1981(4A)
- Girls' Track (2) – 1980(4A), 1981(4A)
- Duals Wrestling (1) – 2019(6A)
- Traditional Wrestling (1) – 2019(6A)

=== Other GHSA state titles ===
- Literary (6) – 1950(B), 1951(A), 1952(A), 1953(A), 1955(A), 1956(A)

=== GIAA state titles ===
- Football (2) – 1940(B), 1947(B)

=== Claimed and unofficial state titles ===
- Football (1) – 1920

== Notable alumni ==
- Jaheim Bell - college football tight end for the Florida State Seminoles
- Buck Belue - football and baseball player, starting quarterback for the national championship-winning 1980 Georgia Bulldogs football team; sports radio personality
- Luther Blue - football player
- John Bond - four-year starting quarterback at Mississippi State
- Dusty Bonner - Kentucky Wildcats football quarterback, later played for Valdosta State Blazers and eventually NFL for the Atlanta Falcons and Arena Football League
- Dana Brinson - former NFL player
- Ellis Clary - former professional baseball player (Washington Senators, St. Louis Browns)
- Buck Coats - former professional baseball player (Chicago Cubs, Cincinnati Reds, Toronto Blue Jays)
- William "Red" Dawson - only surviving coach of the 1970 Marshall tragedy, chronicled in the documentary Marshall University: Ashes to Glory and dramatized in the movie We Are Marshall
- Willie Gary - St. Louis Rams NFL player, played in Super Bowl XXXVI
- DL Hall - professional baseball player and former first round pick, World Series Champion (2026)
- Devonnsha Maxwell - NFL defensive tackle for the Cincinnati Bengals
- Zakoby McClain - football player for the Auburn Tigers, NFL draft prospect
- Malcolm Mitchell - football player, former Georgia Bulldog college player, former New England Patriot NFL player and Super Bowl LI champion
- Todd Peterson (born 1970) - former NFL player
- Charles Ramsey - saved three kidnapped girls
- Tate Rodemaker - college football quarterback
- Stan Rome - former Kansas City Chiefs NFL player
- Coleman Rudolph - football player, former Georgia Tech college player, New York Giants and New York Jets NFL player
- Tiffany Santos, electrical engineer and materials scientist
- Sonny Shroyer - actor, best known for playing Deputy Enos Strate on The Dukes of Hazzard and Coach Paul "Bear" Bryant in Forrest Gump
- Pierce Wallace, ESPN Fan Hall of Fame and television personality
- Julian Webb - Georgia state senator
