= Kerry Murphy (American football) =

American football player (born 1988)

No. 64 – Alabama Crimson Tide
- Position: Nose tackle

Personal information
- Born: July 23, 1988 (age 38); Hoover, Alabama, U.S.
- Listed height: 6 ft 4 in (1.93 m)
- Listed weight: 319 lb (145 kg)

Career information
- High school: Hoover (AL)
- College: Alabama (2009–2011)

Awards and highlights
- 2× BCS national champion (2010, 2012)

Kerry Murphy (born July 23, 1988) is an American former college football defensive tackle. He played for the Alabama Crimson Tide football team from 2009 to 2011. Up until a career ending injury, Murphy was considered one of the top defensive tackles in his class.

== Early life ==
Murphy attended Hoover High School in Alabama, where he made 142 tackles and 16 sacks in junior and senior seasons. A dominant force in the middle, Murphy helped Hoover to two straight Class 6A State Championships in 2005 and 2006. During that period, Hoover was featured on the MTV show Two-A-Days.

After receiving All-American honors by Parade as a senior, Murphy was selected to play in the 2006 Alabama North-South All-Star Game as well as the 2006 US Army All-American Bowl.

Considered a four-star recruit by Rivals.com, Murphy was listed as the No. 4 defensive tackle prospect in the nation. He was also ranked as the No. 2 prospect from Alabama, behind only fellow Crimson Tide teammate Rolando McClain.

Murphy chose Alabama over Auburn, Clemson, Miami, and Louisville, becoming the first commitment Nick Saban received after his hiring in January 2007.

== College career ==
After originally signing with the University of Alabama in the spring of 2007, Murphy failed to qualify that year, and after spending a year at Hargrave Military Academy, he missed again in 2008. Murphy signed one more time with the Crimson Tide in 2008, stayed another semester at Hargrave, then took more classes at Hoover's Cahaba School to raise his grade point average enough to meet NCAA eligibility standards.

He finally enrolled at Alabama in January 2009, and was a third-string back up for senior nose tackle Terrence Cody during the 2009 season. Murphy was unable to finish the 2010 season due to injury and was placed on medical hardship for the 2011 season. Murphy's injuries ended up being career ending as he never returned to play football. He continued his academic career at the University of Alabama and graduated on August 3, 2013.
