= Cornelius Williams =

Cornelius Williams may refer to:

- Cornelius Williams (politician) (1819–1891), American politician
- Cornelius Williams (American football) (born 1987), American football coach and former player
