= EKY =

EKY may refer to these places in the United States:

- Eastern Kentucky
- Bessemer Airport, Alabama (FAA LID:EKY)
