= Interstate 459 =

Highway in Alabama

Interstate 459
- I-459 highlighted in red

Route information
- Auxiliary route of I-59
- Maintained by ALDOT
- Length: 32.8 mi (52.8 km)
- Existed: 1984–present
- NHS: Entire route

Major junctions
- South end: I-20 / I-59 / US 11 near Bessemer
- SR 150 in Hoover; US 31 in Hoover; I-65 in Hoover; US 280 in Birmingham; I-20 in Irondale; US 11 near Trussville
- North end: I-59 near Trussville

Location
- Country: United States
- State: Alabama
- Counties: Jefferson

Highway system
- Interstate Highway System; Main; Auxiliary; Suffixed; Business; Future; Alabama State Highway System; Interstate; US; State
← US 431	→ I-565

Interstate 459 (I-459) is a bypass highway of I-59 that is an alternate Interstate Highway around the southern sides of Birmingham, Bessemer, and several other cities and towns in Jefferson County, Alabama. I-459 lies entirely within Jefferson County. This Interstate Highway is about 32.8 miles (52.8 km) long, and its construction was completed in 1984. I-459 has major interchanges with I-59, I-20, and I-65.

== Route description ==
I-459 begins at a trumpet interchange with I-20/I-59 near Bessemer and McCalla. Exit 1, an interchange with Eastern Valley Road, provides access to the large Colonial Promenade shopping center and McCalla community. The freeway then passes under Pocahontas Road and next to the Bent Brook Golf Club before intersecting with Morgan Road at exit 6. Morgan Road connects with Bessemer, Helena, and the western fringes of Hoover along with the Bessemer Airport. After Morgan Road, I-459 enters a much more populated and developed area, namely the large suburb of Hoover. Once interchanging with State Route 150 (SR 150) at exit 10, the highway turns northeastward and widens to 10 lanes. Exit 13 is with US 31, a major suburban route through Hoover, Vestavia Hills, and Pelham. A southbound flyover ramp at this interchange provides direct access to the Riverchase Galleria. The freeway then approaches its interchange with I-65, one of two four-level stack interchanges in the state (the other being its interchange with I-20). After the I-65 interchange, the roadway decreases to six lanes and has a minor interchange with Acton Road at exit 17. As it exits Hoover, I-459 intersects with US 280, an 8- to 10-lane suburban arterial that is one of the most congested roads in Greater Birmingham. The area around this interchange contains many hotels and office buildings. After the US 280 interchange, it turns north and enters a residential area along the Cahaba River, crossing the river twice before passing the "Miss Liberty" (Statue of Liberty replica) and the exit 23 interchange with Liberty Parkway and Overton Road. The highway passes east of Mountain Brook while turning northeast and interchanging with Grants Mill Road at exit 27. After this intersection, I-459 turns northward again as it approaches the suburb of Trussville. The interchange with I-20 is one of two stack interchanges in Greater Birmingham. In its last few miles, the highway intersects with Derby Parkway and US 11 in Trussville before completing its 33-mile (53 km) course with an interchange at I-59.

== Future ==
=== An additional interchange for I-459 ===
Negotiations between the Alabama Department of Transportation (ALDOT) and the city of Hoover are continuing regarding the prospective building of an additional interchange for I-459 at South Shades Crest Road, a heavily traveled traffic artery to help relieve congestion on SR 150. On August 31, 2023, Governor Kay Ivey announced this interchange would add a numbered exit 9, about one mile from exit 10 (SR 150). The project, which is a City of Hoover-led initiative, is expected to cost $120 million.

=== Northern bypass ===
There are plans to construct another Interstate Highway bypass running north of the Birmingham area to provide another Interstate Highway that would have major interchanges with I-59 (two), I-20 (one), I-65 (one), and I-22, with all of these interchanges being either north or west of Birmingham. This planned Birmingham Northern Beltline has been numbered I-422. This northern bypass of the urban area, if completed, would give Birmingham and Jefferson County a completely ringed Interstate bypass. I-65, I-59, and I-459 are expected to be widened or reconstructed to accommodate the increase in traffic that will come from the construction of I-422.

== Exit list ==
The entire route is in Jefferson County.

Location	mi	km	Exit	Destinations	Notes
	0.00	0.00	—	I-422 north	Proposed continuation beyond I-59/I-20
	0.00	0.00	0A-B	I-20 (US-11/SR-5/SR-7) / I-59 – Birmingham, Tuscaloosa	I-20/59 exit 106; southbound exit and northbound entrance; southern terminus & trumpet interchange for now & signed as left exit 0A (west/south) & 0B (east/north).
Bessemer	1.86	2.99	1	Bessemer, McCalla	Eastern Valley Road
Bessemer	6.40	10.30	6	Helena, Bessemer	Morgan Road
Bessemer	9.30	14.97	9	Shades Crest Road (CR 97)	Proposed to relieve congestion on exit 10
Hoover	10.69	17.20	10	SR 150 – Hoover, Bessemer	Hoover Metropolitan Stadium (formerly Regions Park); Riverchase Galleria
Hoover	13.48	21.69	13A	To SR 150 / Galleria Boulevard	Southbound exit and northbound entrance
Hoover	13.94	22.43	13B	US 31 (SR-3) – Hoover, Pelham	Signed as exit 13 northbound
Hoover	15.34	24.69	15	I-65 – Birmingham, Montgomery	I-65 exit 250
	17.32	27.87	17	Acton Road	
Birmingham	19.97	32.14	19	US 280 (SR-38) – Mountain Brook, Childersburg	
Birmingham	23.94	38.53	23	Liberty Parkway	
Irondale	27.31	43.95	27	Grants Mill Road	
Irondale	29.25	47.07	29	I-20 – Birmingham, Atlanta	I-20 exit 136
Birmingham	31.18	50.18	31	Derby Parkway	
	32.80	52.79	32	US 11 (SR-7) – Trussville	
	33.23	53.48	33	I-59 – Birmingham, Gadsden	Northbound exit and southbound entrance; northern terminus; I-59 exit 137; signed as left exit 33A (south) & 33B (north); directional T interchange.
1.000 mi = 1.609 km; 1.000 km = 0.621 mi: Incomplete access; Unopened
