= Cornelius Williams (American football) =

American football coach (born 1987)

Biographical details
- Born: September 6, 1987 (age 39); Mobile, Alabama, U.S.

Playing career
- 2006–2009: Troy
- Position: Wide receiver

Coaching career (HC unless noted)
- 2010: South Alabama (GA)
- 2011: Murray State (WR)
- 2012: North Alabama (WR)
- 2013: Jacksonville State (WR)
- 2014: UAB (WR)
- 2015–2020: Troy (WR)
- 2021: Auburn (WR)
- 2022: Alabama (offensive analyst)
- 2023: New Mexico (WR)
- 2024–2025: Middle Tennessee (WR)

Cornelius Terrell Williams (born September 6, 1987) is an American football coach and former player. Williams was most recently the wide receivers coach for the Middle Tennessee Blue Raiders.

== Early life ==
Cornelius Terrell Williams was born on September 6, 1987, to Jeff and Wanda Singer. Williams was born in Mobile, Alabama but later moved to the city of Hoover inside the metropolitan area of Birmingham, Alabama.

After playing football at Simmons Middle School, Williams attended Hoover High School and played football there under head coach Rush Propst. As a freshman, Williams played quarterback and wide receiver for the junior varsity football team. Williams joined the varsity football team as a sophomore, in which year he had 49 catches for 565 yards and 9 touchdowns from quarterback John Parker Wilson. In Williams' junior year, he caught 55 passes with 11 touchdowns, helping Hoover to a 15–0 record. During his senior year, Williams, along with the Hoover High School football team, was featured on the MTV reality show Two-A-Days. Midway through the season, quarterback Ross Wilson suffered a concussion, and Williams played quarterback until Wilson returned from injury. Williams ultimately finished the season with high school career-highs, including 77 catches, 1,299 receiving yards, and 18 touchdowns. Additionally, Williams was named an all-star by the ASWA and played in the Alabama-Mississippi All-Star Game. During his time at Hoover High School, Hoover won the state championship every year Williams was there.

== College career ==
Williams chose to attend Troy University to play football in college. In his freshman year, Williams recorded 6 catches for 32 yards. Williams saw an increase in those statistics his sophomore year, with 19 catches, 217 yards, and 2 touchdowns. The next year, Williams' catches and receiving yards dropped to 18 and 174, but he did set a career-high with 3 touchdowns. In his senior year, Williams set a career-high with 20 catches and 341 yards, along with 2 touchdowns.

== Coaching career ==
After graduating from Troy with a degree in sport and fitness management, Williams became a graduate assistant for South Alabama in 2010. The next year, Williams received his first wide receiver coaching job with Murray State. Over the next three years, Williams served as the wide receivers coach at North Alabama, Jacksonville State, and UAB. Following the folding of the UAB football team after the 2014 season, Williams joined his alma mater, Troy, as a wide receivers coach in 2015. Williams served in that role until 2021 when he was hired as the wide receivers coach for the Auburn Tigers football team. However, Williams was fired after only four games in the 2021 season, with head coach Bryan Harsin citing that "a change needed to be made." Williams was hired as an offensive analyst the next season by the Alabama Crimson Tide football team. The next year, Williams returned to the role of wide receivers coach at New Mexico. In 2024, Williams became the wide receivers coach for Middle Tennessee. Near the end of the 2025 season, amidst a 1–8 start, Middle Tennessee fired Williams.

== Personal life ==
Williams is married to Kiley Williams (formerly Miller), and has three children: Ellis, Wynn, and Maverick.
