= Jahi Word-Daniels =

American football player (born 1986)

No. 33
- Position: Safety

Personal information
- Born: November 19, 1986 (age 39); Laurel, Mississippi, U.S.
- Listed height: 6 ft 0 in (1.83 m)
- Listed weight: 194 lb (88 kg)

Career information
- High school: Hoover (AL)
- College: Georgia Tech
- NFL draft: 2009: undrafted

Career history
- San Francisco 49ers (2009)*; Detroit Lions (2009); Virginia Destroyers (2011)*
- * Offseason or practice squad member only

Career NFL statistics
- Games played: 2
- Total tackles: 1
- Stats at Pro Football Reference

Jahi Lateef Word-Daniels (born November 19, 1986) is an American former professional football player who was a cornerback in the National Football League (NFL). He was signed by the San Francisco 49ers as an undrafted free agent in 2009. He played college football for the Georgia Tech Yellow Jackets.

Word-Daniels was also a member of the Detroit Lions and Virginia Destroyers.
