= Eric Adams (basketball) =

American basketball player (born 1995)

No. 13 – SAM Basket Massagno
- Position: Center
- League: Swiss Basketball League

Personal information
- Born: May 14, 1995 (age 31) Hoover, Alabama, U.S.
- Listed height: 6 ft 8 in (2.03 m)
- Listed weight: 220 lb (100 kg)

Career information
- High school: Hoover (Hoover, Alabama)
- College: Samford (2013–2018)
- NBA draft: 2018: undrafted
- Playing career: 2018–present

Career history
- 2018–2020: Södertälje BBK
- 2020–2022: Lions de Genève
- 2022–2023: Kobrat
- 2023: BC Körmend
- 2023: Belfius Mons-Hainaut
- 2024: BC Balkan Botevgrad
- 2024: Papagou B.C.
- 2025-present: SAM Basket Massagno

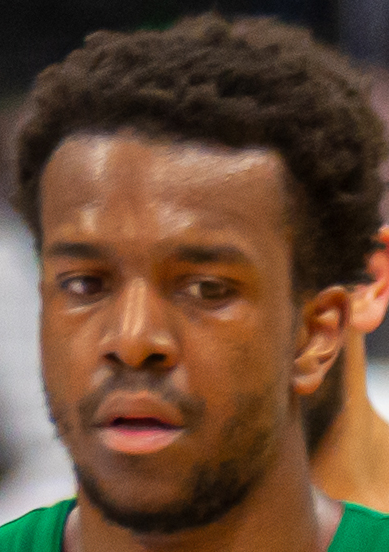
Swedish Men Final 2019 Telge vs Boras

Eric Adams Jr (born May 14, 1995) is an American professional basketball player for SAM Basket Massagno. He played college basketball for the Samford Bulldogs.

== Early life and high school ==
Adams attended Hoover High School in Hoover, AL.

== College career ==
Adams played college basketball at Samford University from 2013 to 2018. His freshman year he played in two games and averaged 1 point. During the 2014–2015 season, he redshirted. In 2015–2016, he started in two games and averaged 1.7 points and 1.8 rebounds. In 2016–2017, he started in two games and averaged 2.4 points and 2.8 rebounds. In 2017–2018, he started in all games except two. He averaged 10 points and 6.5 rebounds.

== Professional career ==
=== Sodertalje Kings (2018-2020) ===
Adams played with the Södertälje BBK from 2018 to 2020.

During the 2018–2019 season, he played in 46 games and averaged 9.4 points, 6.6 rebounds and 1.1 assists per game.

During the 2019–2020 season, he played in 29 games and averaged 11.1 points, 8.3 rebounds and 1.2 assists per game.

On January 5, 2020, Adams received an Interperformances Player of the Week award for Round 21. He had a game-high 31 points, 8 rebounds and 2 assists. On March 2, 2020, he received another player of the week award for Round 32. He had a double-double of 23 points and 12 rebounds.

During the 2020 season, he was awarded All-Swedish Basketligan Honorable Mention.

=== Lions de Geneve (2020-2022) ===
Adams played Lions de Genève from 2020 to 2022.

During the 2020–2021 season, he played in 19 games and averaged 8.6 points and 6.8 rebounds.

During the 2021–2022 season, he played in 33 games and averaged 9.6 points and 5.6 rebounds.

=== Lapuan Kobrat (2022-2023) ===
On September 16, 2022, Adams signed with Kobrat.

=== Egis-Kormend (2023) ===
On January 9, 2023, Adams signed with BC Körmend.

=== Belfius Mons-Hainaut (2023) ===
On August 1, 2023, Adams signed with Belfius Mons-Hainaut. On December 12, 2023, the team decided to release Adams. He had been averaging 8 points and 6 rebounds per game.

=== Balkan Botevgrad (2024) ===
On February 28, 2024, Adams signed with BC Balkan Botevgrad.

=== SAM Basket Massagno (2025-present) ===
On September 3, 2025, Adams signed with SAM Basket Massagno for the 2025-2026 season.

== Personal life ==
Adams is the son of Eric and Cassandra Adams. His father played basketball at Fisk University in Nashville, TN.
