= Spain Park High School =

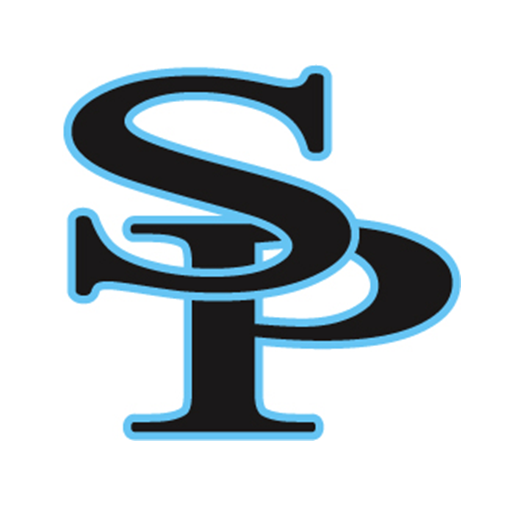

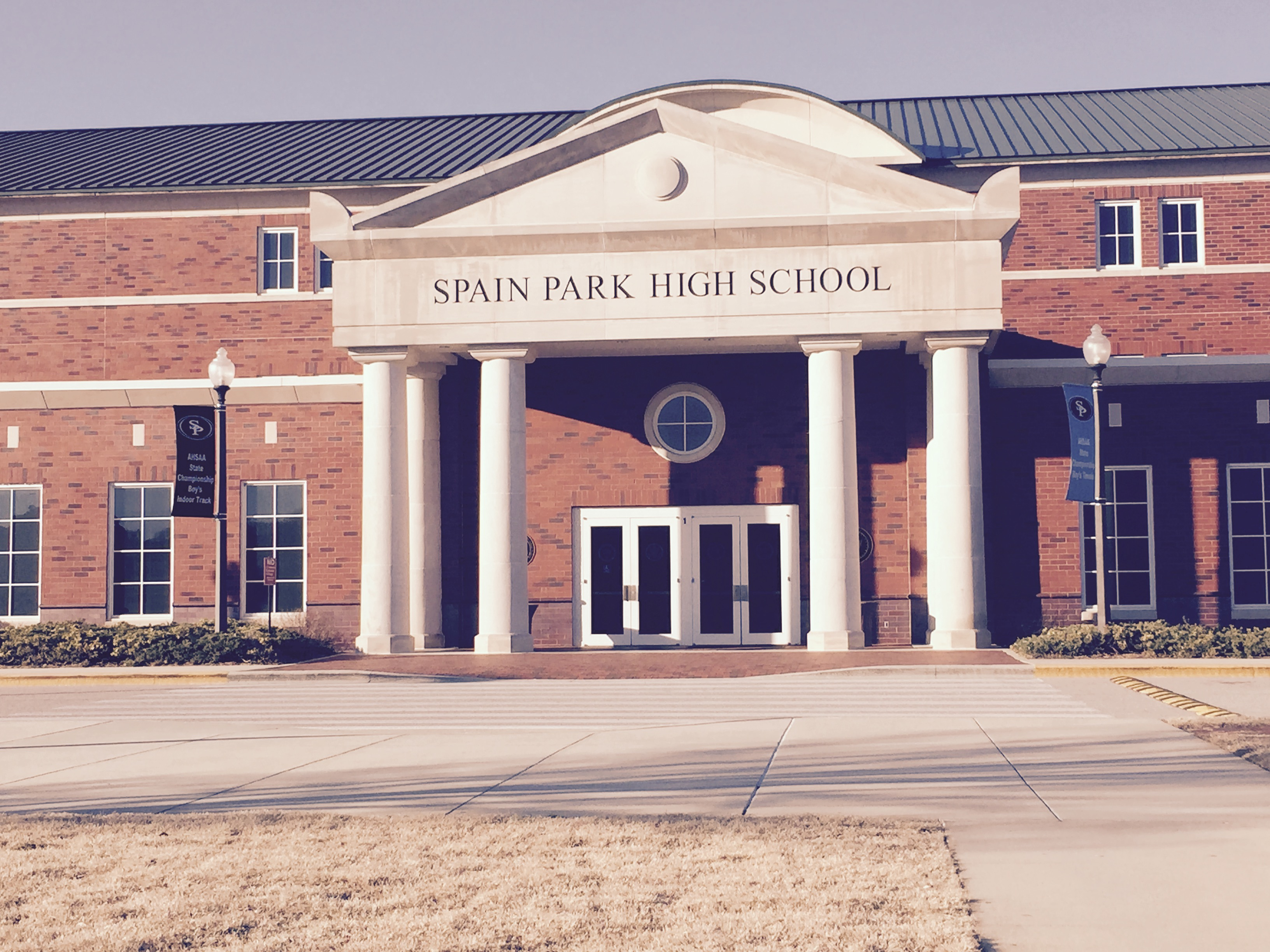

Location
- 4700 Jaguar Drive; Hoover, Alabama 35242; United States; 33°23′32″N 86°43′44″W

Information
- Type: Public
- Opened: 2001 (25 years ago)
- School district: Hoover City Schools
- CEEB code: 010381
- Principal: Amanda Esslinger
- Faculty: 94.45 (on an FTE basis)
- Grades: 09-12
- Enrollment: 1,502 (2023–2024)
- Student to teacher ratio: 15.90
- Colors: Light Blue, Black, and White
- Athletics: AHSAA Class 6A
- Mascot: Jaguars
- Newspaper: The Jag
- Yearbook: The Rosette
- Website: sphs.hoovercityschools.net

Spain Park High School (SPHS) is a four-year high school in the Birmingham, Alabama, suburb of Hoover, that includes the Greystone Golf & Country Club–a 4000-acre master-planned golf community. It is the smaller of two high schools in the Hoover City School System. School colors are Carolina blue, black, and white, and the athletic teams are called the Jaguars. SPHS competes in AHSAA Class 6A athletics.

== Academics ==
- Niche ranked SPHS as a top high school in the state in 2025.
- The U.S. Department of Education recognized SPHS as a National Blue Ribbon School in 2008.

== Demographics ==
Enrollment in grades 9–12 for the 2023–24 school year was 1,502 students. Approximately 60% of students are White, 19% are Black, 11% are Hispanic, 6.6% are Asian, and 3.3% are multiracial.

== Athletics ==
SPHS competes in AHSAA Class 6A athletics, and fields teams in the following sports:

- Baseball
- Basketball
- Bowling
- Cheerleading
- Cross Country
- Dance
- Football
- Golf
- Indoor Track & Field
- Lacrosse (non-AHSAA sport)
- Outdoor Track & Field
- Rowing
- Soccer
- Softball
- Swimming & Diving
- Tennis
- Volleyball
- Wrestling

SPHS has won state championships in the following sports:

- Lacrosse (2011, 2012, 2015, 2016)
- Baseball (2014)
- Boys' golf (2008, 2009, 2010, 2012, 2013, 2014, 2016)
- Girls' golf (2009, 2017, 2022)
- Boys' indoor track and field (2012)
- Girls' soccer (2004, 2009, 2010, 2011, 2022)
- Boys' soccer (2021)
- Girls' tennis (2010)
- Boys' tennis (2007, 2021)
- Boys' bowling (2016, 2017. 2022, 2024)
- Girls' basketball (2018, 2020)

Spain Park's football team was shown on MTV's television program Two-A-Days, as an opponent of arch-rival Hoover High.

== Notable alumni ==
- Tyler Grisham (2005) – football player, NFL
- Chris Ellis (2010) – baseball player, MLB
- Simone Charley (2013) – soccer player, NWSL
- Nick Mullens (2013) – football player, NFL
- Michael Jackson (2015) – football player, NFL
- Austin Wiley (2016) – basketball player who plays in Israel
- Sarah Ashlee Barker (2020) – basketball player, WNBA
- Colton Ledbetter (2020)– baseball player in the Tampa Bay Rays organization
