= Hunter Street Baptist Church =

Church in Hoover, Alabama, US

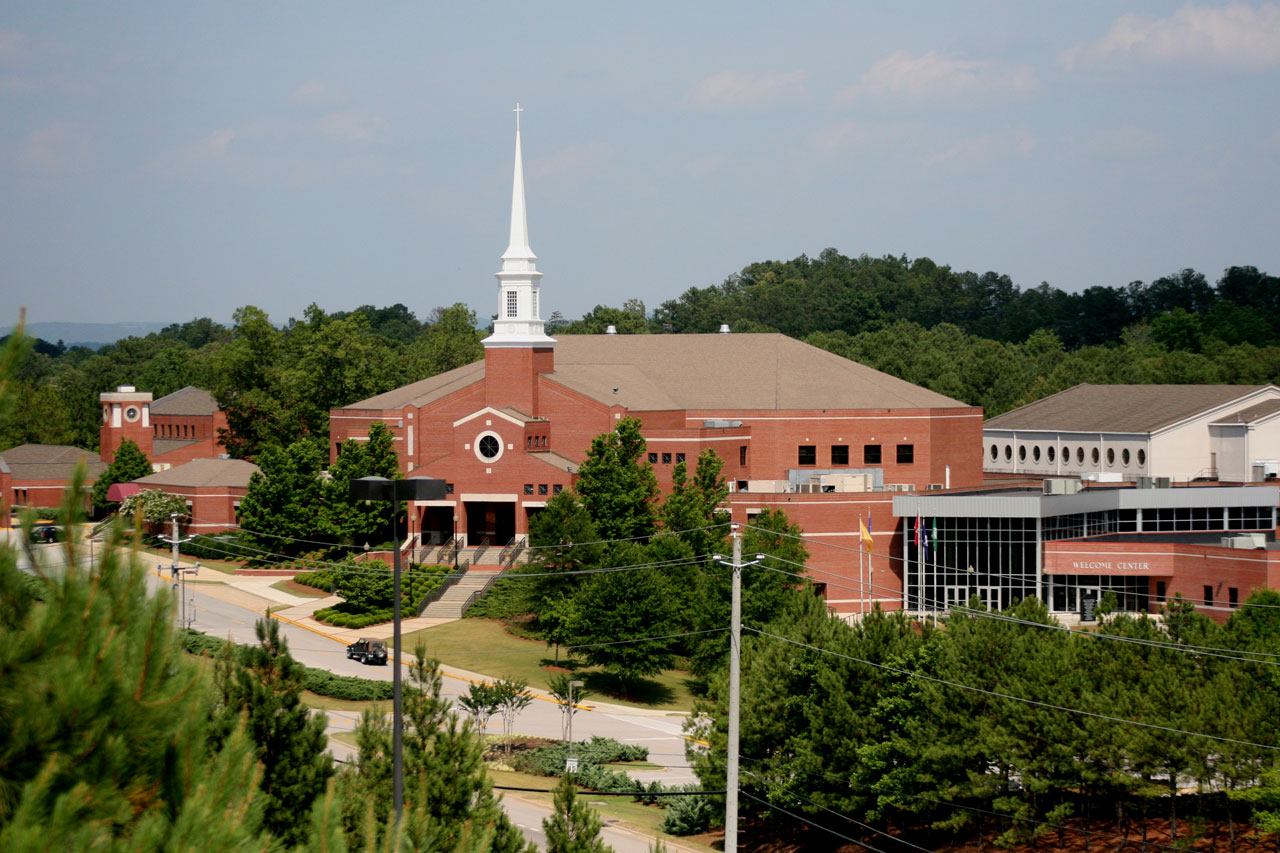
- The main sanctuary of Hunter Street Baptist Church.
- Hunter Street Baptist Church
- 33.355450°N 86.839098°W
- Address: Hoover, Alabama
- Country: United States
- Denomination: Southern baptist
- Website: www.hunterstreet.org

History
- Founded: 1907

Hunter Street Baptist Church (established 1907) is a Baptist Church located in Hoover, Alabama, a suburb of Birmingham. It is affiliated with the Southern Baptist Convention.

As of 2018, the church has a membership of approximately 4,500. The church is known for its motto "Hunter Street is not a building, but a people; people committed to God and to each other." Adults grow in faith in Small groups and Bible studies. The Arts Academy offers music lessons, kids can play sports, and young children learn in Weekday Education.

Rev. Chandler Snyder was elected senior pastor on June 28, 2026. Dr. Buddy Gray was the senior pastor from 1986 through June 2026. Gray previously served as the church's youth pastor from 1978 to 1980 while he was a student at Samford University.

== History ==
The church was established in 1907. It was originally located in the western section of Birmingham, some twenty miles (32 km) from its current location. The original meeting location was in the Compton Hill community, now called Fairview. The church originally met in various temporary locations, including a school and several private homes. The first permanent house of worship for this congregation was built in 1908 at the intersection of Hayes Avenue and Hunter Street (now Eufaula Avenue and 24th Street). They remained in this location until December 1928, when they moved to a larger facility at the corner of 17th Street and 4th Court West, approximately 1/3-mile from the previous location. This new building included a sanctuary that seated over 700, as well as numerous Sunday School classrooms. Numerical growth occurred in the church throughout the next several decades, making Hunter Street one of the largest Baptist churches in Birmingham, if not all of Alabama. A chapel and additional educational space was constructed across the street from the newer location in 1952, and in 1958, a new 1800-seat sanctuary was dedicated. This sanctuary was constructed adjoining the 1952 building. During the 1960s, the church broadcast its Sunday morning worship service live, first on radio on WAQY 1220, then beginning in 1967 on WBMG-TV (now WIAT). This broadcast ministry continued through 1972. A Family Life Center, with a gymnasium and game room, was constructed in 1974.

== 1960s — 1980s ==
Membership and attendance at Hunter Street began to decline in the late 1960s and early 1970s. This was due to several factors, including the growth of Birmingham suburbs such as Vestavia Hills, Homewood and Forestdale, as well as the change in the socio-economic makeup of the neighborhood surrounding Hunter Street. This decline in attendance continued into the 1980s. Average weekly attendance, which had peaked at around 1500, had fallen to around 225. By 1985, the majority of those people attending Hunter Street were retired persons in their seventies and eighties. In 1987, the church voted to sell its facilities to Sardis Baptist Church, a predominantly African American congregation, and relocate to the rapidly growing suburb of Hoover. Hunter Street met for the last time at its 4th Court location in September 1987.

== Move to suburbs ==
Beginning in September 1987, and for the next 18 months, Hunter Street held its weekly services at the facilities of a Seventh-day Adventist Church in Hoover. Almost immediately after beginning its ministry in Hoover, the church began to experience numerical growth. The church had purchased property for a new permanent location on Alabama State Route 150, but was waiting for construction to be finished. On Easter Sunday, 1989, the congregation dedicated its new facilities, which included a 550-seat sanctuary, educational space and a choir rehearsal room.

Almost immediately, the church experienced tremendous growth. Six months after dedicating the new facilities, an additional worship service was added to accommodate the growing number of people attending services. More Sunday School classrooms were built in 1990. Additional worship services and Sunday school hours were added in 1991 and 1992; still, the church was bursting at the seams. In 1992, the church voted to purchase additional property contiguous with the property it already owned, extending the church property line to Mars Hill Road. The church successfully petitioned the City of Hoover to rename Mars Hill Road as Hunter Street. This meant that for the first time in 65 years, Hunter Street Baptist Church was located on or near Hunter Street.

== 1990s through today ==
On January 16, 1994, Hunter Street Baptist Church dedicated a new 1600-seat worship center, as well as more Sunday School classroom space and a new music suite. The worship center was renovated and expanded in 2000, bringing the seating capacity to around 1950. Additional construction projects have included a recreation center built in 1997 called the R.O.C (Recreation Outreach Center), a building for high school and junior high student worship and education called the 24:7 Building in 2002, later renamed the Hunter Street Student Building in 2007, to better communicate the church's desire for unity. The church dedicated a new children's education center in 2003. In early 2006, the church began simulcasting the 9:30 A.M. worship service to the former sanctuary and to the youth building, making room for additional worshippers in the main worship center. Late in 2007, the 9:30 A.M. was named Chapel Worship and hosted students from middle school to college.

The church celebrated its centennial in 2007. Later that year, the congregation celebrated its twentieth anniversary of ministry in Hoover.

The music ministry of the church has released four CD's since 1996: Jesus Changed My World (1996), Consider the Cross (2003), How Great: Live Worship at Hunter Street (2005), and S.D.G. (2008). The church's adult choir and orchestra led in worship at the annual meeting of the Southern Baptist Convention in Louisville, Kentucky on June 23 and 24, 2009.

On April 25, 2012, the church voted to renovate its worship center. The project was conducted that July through August. Features of the renovation included new flooring, a new color scheme, theater-style seating, and a new choir loft and orchestra area. While the renovation was being carried out, Sunday worship services were held in the church's gymnasium, chapel (the former worship center) and student building.

On September 14, 2025, pastor Buddy Gray announced his retirement, effective June 1, 2026, coinciding with his 40th annviersary as pastor. Chandler Snyder was elected as senior pastor on June 28, 2026. Gray was designated as pastor emeritus.

== Beliefs ==
Hunter Street is affiliated with the Southern Baptist Convention, and is a member of the Birmingham Baptist Association.

== See also ==
- Garrison, Greg (1998-01-25). "MEGACHURCHES: FILLING A VOID, BIG CHURCHES WITH LOTS OF SERVICES AND THOUSANDS OF MEMBERS ARE TAKING ON THE ROLES THAT FAMILIES AND FRIENDLY NEIGHBORS USED TO PLAY". The Birmingham News. pp. 1A.
- "Hunter Street named 'healthy church' by NOBTS". The Alabama Baptist. 2007-03-22. Archived from the original on 2007-09-30.
- Emily Winslett (2004-03-21). "Faith on 42 Acres: A visit to the Hunter Street Baptist Church". Covering Religion: The Soul of the South. Columbia University Graduate School of Journalism. Archived from the original on 2006-02-22.
