= Alabama State Route 150 =

State highway in Alabama, United States

State Route 150

Route information
- Maintained by ALDOT
- Length: 11.833 mi (19.043 km)

Major junctions
- West end: US 11 / SR 5 in Bessemer
- I-459 in Hoover
- East end: US 31 in Hoover

Location
- Country: United States
- State: Alabama
- Counties: Jefferson

Highway system
- Alabama State Highway System; Interstate; US; State
← SR 149	→ SR 151

State Route 150 (SR 150) is a 11.833-mile-long (19.043 km) state highway that connects the Birmingham suburbs of Bessemer and Hoover in Jefferson County in the central part of the U.S. state of Alabama. The western terminus of the highway is at an intersection with U.S. Route 11 (US 11) and SR 5 in Bessemer. The eastern terminus of the highway is at an intersection with US 31 in Hoover.

== Route description ==
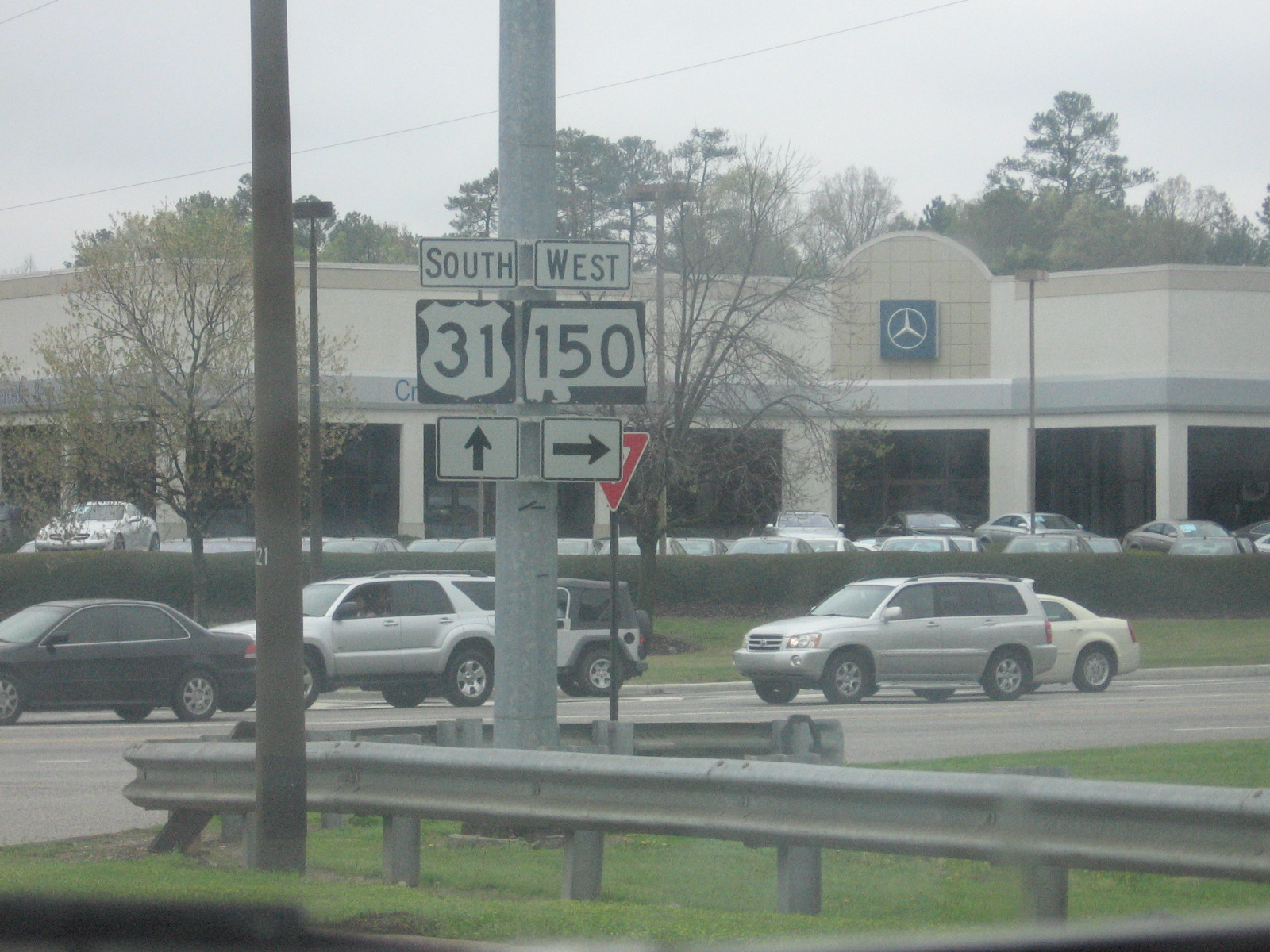
Intersection of SR 150 and US 31 in Hoover.

Since the 1980s, many commercial developments have been built along SR 150 in Hoover. Several large retail developments, including the Riverchase Galleria and the Patton Creek shopping center, are located along or adjoining to this route. A strip center featuring a Wal-Mart Supercenter, Stein Mart, and Academy Sports + Outdoors opened in 2002 approximately 3 miles (4.8 km) west of the Riverchase Galleria. Hunter Street Baptist Church, one of the largest churches in Alabama, is located on this highway. The Hoover Metropolitan Stadium, formerly known as Regions Park, is accessible via the highway, as are the Oxmoor Valley course of the Robert Trent Jones Golf Trail and the Ross Bridge Golf Resort and Spa.

In Hoover, SR 150 has been designated as John Hawkins Parkway, in honor of the late Alabama state legislator who represented the city and southern Jefferson County. In Bessemer, SR 150 is referred to as 14th Street.

== History ==
Before 1984, SR 150 was a two-lane highway from the Bessemer city limits to Hoover. However, residential, commercial, and institutional growth has led to the city of Hoover widening the highway from US 31 to I-459. Work began in May 2006 to widen SR 150 to five lanes from I-459 to Ross Bridge Parkway, a distance of approximately 3 miles (4.8 km).

== Future ==
Future plans call for widening the entire highway, from Bessemer to Hoover, to five lanes.

== Major intersections ==
The entire route is in Jefferson County.

Location	mi	km	Destinations	Notes
Bessemer	0.000	0.000	US 11 (SR 7) / SR 5 (Bessemer Super Highway)	Western terminus
Hoover	10.748	17.297	I-459 – Tuscaloosa, Birmingham, Montgomery	I-459 exit 10
Hoover	11.833	19.043	US 31 (SR 3 / Montgomery Highway)	Eastern terminus
1.000 mi = 1.609 km; 1.000 km = 0.621 mi
