= Ross Bridge, Alabama =

Neighborhood in Hoover, Alabama

Coordinates: 33°23′40″N 86°53′11″W

Ross Bridge is a neighborhood in Hoover, Alabama. The area is named for the railway bridge constructed over Ross Creek by the Confederate Army during the Civil War. The area was annexed into Hoover and the neighborhood began development in 2004. The neighborhood consists primarily of single-family residential homes with attached residential housing, commercial buildings and mixed residential and commercial buildings concentrated in the village center. It is home to the Ross Bridge Golf Resort and Spa.

Ross Bridge is the location of the annual Ross Bridge 8K run.
