= Tiffany Santos =

American electrical engineer and materials scientist

Tiffany Suzanne Santos (born 1980) is an American electrical engineer and materials scientist who works for the research division of Western Digital as an expert on tunnel magnetoresistance, non-volatile memory, and magnetic thin-film memory, and as Director of Non-Volatile Memory Materials Research.

== Education and career ==
Santos is the daughter of Ted Santos, a physician and pathologist in Valdosta, Georgia. After graduating as salutatorian from Valdosta High School, she became a student of materials science and engineering at the Massachusetts Institute of Technology, where she received a bachelor's degree in 2002 and a Ph.D. in 2007 under the supervision of Jagadeesh Moodera. She received the Outstanding Senior Thesis award of the MIT Department of Materials Science and Engineering for her bachelor's thesis, Ferromagnetic Europium Oxide as a Spin-Filter Material. Her doctoral dissertation, Europium oxide as a perfect electron spin filter, was based on research applying magnetic materials in spintronics.

She became a postdoctoral researcher and then staff scientist at the Argonne National Laboratory before joining Hitachi Global Storage Technologies (HGST) in 2011. HGST was acquired by Western Digital in 2012.

== Recognition ==
Santos received the L’Oréal USA Fellowship for Women in Science in 2009. In 2022 she was a distinguished lecturer of the IEEE Magnetics Society.

She was named as a Fellow of the American Physical Society (APS) in 2024, after a nomination from the APS Topical Group on Magnetism and Its Applications, "for innovative contributions in synthesis and characterization of novel ultrathin magnetic films and interfaces, and tailoring their properties for optimal performance, especially in magnetic data storage and spin-transport devices".
