= Valdosta City School District =

School district in Georgia (U.S. state)

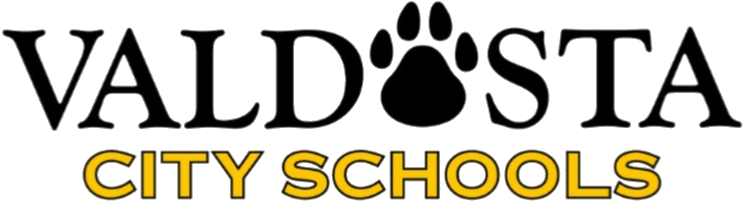

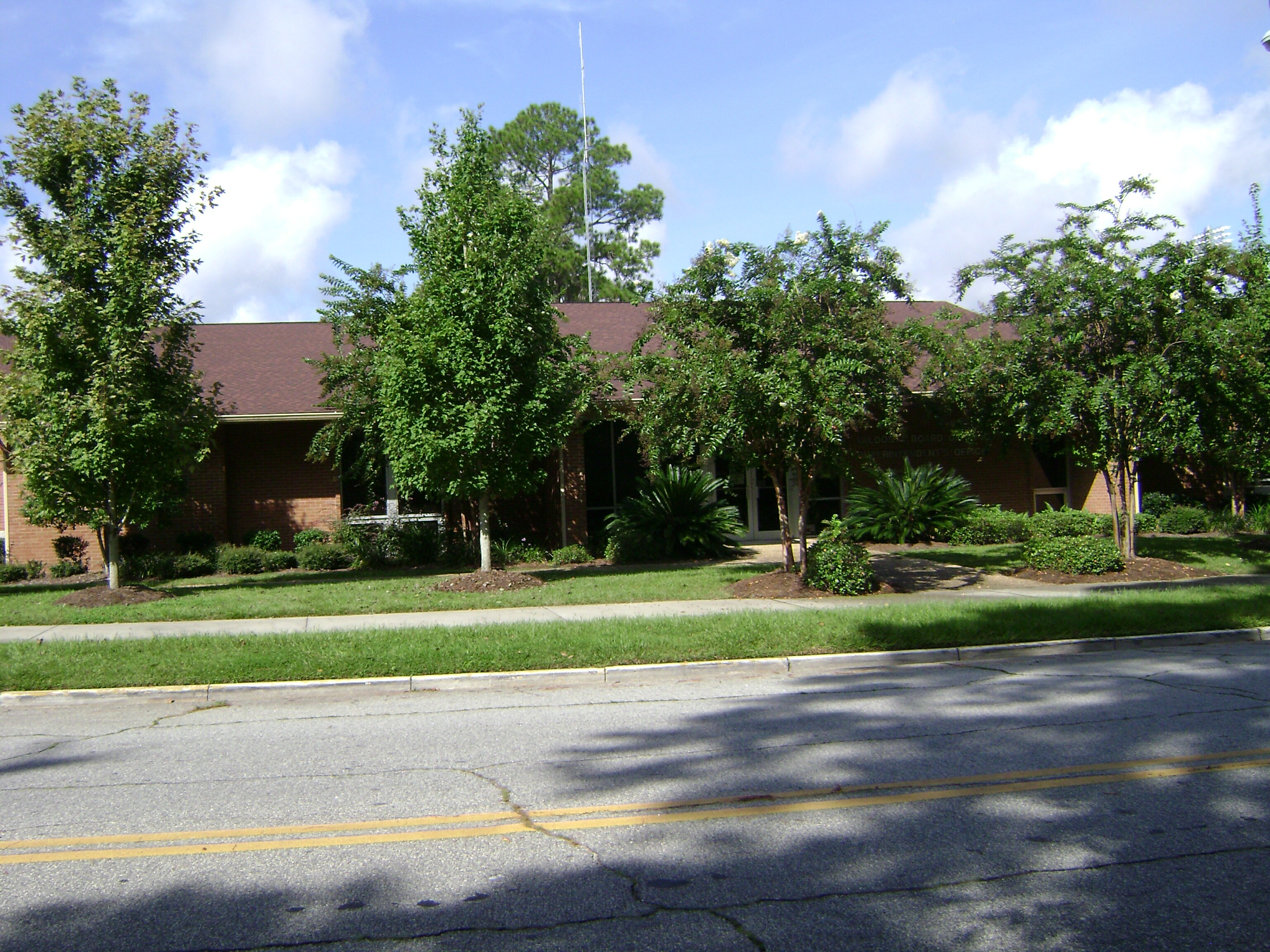
- District headquarters

Address
- 1204 Williams Street Valdosta, Georgia, 31601-4043; United States
- Coordinates: 30.844623°N 83.282537°W

District information
- Grades: Pre-kindergarten – 12
- Superintendent: Craig Lockhart
- Accreditations: Southern Association of Colleges and Schools; Georgia Accrediting Commission

Students and staff
- Enrollment: 8,291 (2022–23)
- Faculty: 599.60 (FTE)
- Staff: 609.90 (FTE)
- Student–teacher ratio: 13.83

Other information
- Telephone: (229) 333-8500
- Fax: (229) 247-7757
- Website: gocats.org

The Valdosta City School District is a public school district in Lowndes County, Georgia, United States, based in Valdosta. The district's boundary is that of the city limits of Valdosta.

== Schools ==
The Valdosta City School District has five elementary schools, two middle schools, and one high school.

Elementary schools

- J. L. Lomax Elementary School
- W.G Nunn Elementary School
- S.L. Mason Elementary School
- Sallas Mahone Elementary School
- Pinevale Elementary School
  - The current building opened in 2013**

Middle schools

- Newbern Middle School
- Valdosta Middle School

High school

- Valdosta High School

Alternative school

- Pinevale Learning Center

Academy

- Valdosta Early College Academy
