= Two-A-Days =

- Starring: Alex Binder; Kristin Boyle; Max Lerner; Ross Wilson; Dwarn "Repete" Smith; Bryan Morgan; Rush Propst; John "Goose" Dunham; Jeremy Pruitt; Cornelius Williams
- Opening theme: "The War" by Angels & Airwaves
- Country of origin: United States
- No. of episodes: 16

Production
- Executive producers: Jason Sciavicco, Dave Sirulnick
- Running time: 30 minutes

Original release
- Network: MTV
- Release: August 23, 2006 – March 27, 2007

Two-A-Days is an MTV reality show that chronicled the lives of teens at Hoover High School in Hoover, Alabama, a suburb of nearby Birmingham. It focused on the members of the school's highly rated Hoover Buccaneers football team during the season, while they balanced athletics with school and relationships.

The show premiered on August 23, 2006 in the US and premiered on MTV Canada on September 7, 2006. Repeat episodes of the show are also shown on CMT.

In Hoover, the show's premiere episode was shown to the cast, their families and supporters at a local theater; the event was staged as a movie premiere, with the traditional red carpet replaced by a carpet of artificial turf, complete with stripes as would be found on a football field. The second season began on Tuesday, January 30, 2007.

== Season 1 ==
Two-A-Days debuted on August 23, 2006, with a 60-minute pilot episode and continued with eight additional episodes that lasted 30 minutes each. The first season followed the Hoover Buccaneers football team during the 2005 season while they competed for their fourth consecutive state championship and dealt with many obstacles along the way. In the pilot episode, the Buccaneers defeated Nease High School of Florida, a team led by 2007 Heisman Trophy winner Tim Tebow.

Cast of Characters:

- Alex Binder (#34) is a senior and starting linebacker for the Hoover Bucs and one of the co-captains for the team. Despite being referred to as a safety by MTV, Coach Propst announces him as a linebacker. Much of the show centers on his hopes for an athletic scholarship to attend college and his relationship with Kristin, a cheerleader.
- Kristin Boyle is a senior at Hoover, captain of the cheerleading team, and Alex's girlfriend.
- Dwarn "Repete" Smith (#91) is a starting defensive end. Repete and his family moved to Hoover because his father wanted him to play for the Bucs to hopefully earn a scholarship and be the first in the family to attend college.
- Ross Wilson (#14) is a junior and is the starting quarterback, whose older brother, John Parker Wilson, was the quarterback for the Alabama Crimson Tide at the time.
- Rush Propst is the controversial head coach of the team.
- Max Lerner (#24) is a senior and a starting safety. His stepfather, Jim, stays close to the program.
- John C. "Goose" Dunham (#90) is a senior and starting defensive lineman. He is a close friend of Kristin.
- Cornelius Williams (#1) is the top wide receiver on the team. He briefly plays quarterback when Ross gets injured midway through the season.
- Other coaches:
  - Jeremy Pruitt: Defensive coordinator and good friends with Jim.
  - Terry Slay: Team chaplain and youth pastor of Hunter Street Baptist Church, located near the school campus.
- Other students:
  - Danielle, a freshman cheerleader who dates Alex at the end of Season 1.
  - Blair, a senior cheerleader and one of Kristin's best friends.
  - Taylor, a senior and ex-football player who throws frequent parties.
  - Keagan, a senior who gets involved in the drama between Alex and Kristin.
  - Elliot Mayson, Ross's girlfriend, who is a sophomore cheerleader. They have been dating for roughly a year.

== Life after Season 1 ==
- Alex Binder accepted a partial scholarship to Bevill State Community College, despite missing his senior season of baseball due to shoulder surgery. He left the school due to subsequent shoulder problems and legal trouble stemming from a July 2006 arrest for breaking and entering a motor vehicle. He was sent to disciplinary boot camp and was released in the summer of 2007. He began dating Danielle shortly after he and Kristin broke up, and they were eventually married. Together they had a daughter, Maria Grace, but the two are now divorced.
- Kristin Boyle attended the University of Alabama. She was a member of Phi Mu sorority and served on the student government. On an episode of "Two-A-Days: Three Years Later," she said that she lost touch with Alex after high school. She is currently an external auditor for an accounting firm in Georgia and is married.
- Max Lerner accepted a scholarship from Football Championship Subdivision (formerly Division I-AA) school Furman University in Greenville, South Carolina. Lerner was selected for First Team Defense honors on the All-Southern Conference football team after his sophomore season. Today he works as an account manager for Georgia Duplicating Products.
- Ross Wilson would return for his senior season at Hoover to be the starting quarterback. He announced his intention to play college baseball for the University of Alabama.
- Dwarn "Repete" Smith joined Auburn University as a walk-on during the 2006 season after turning down several scholarships from Division II and non-scholarship offers from Division III schools. He eventually quit the team, but later announced his intention to walk on again for the 2007 season. He did not end up playing at Auburn, and instead transferred to Jacksonville State University. He currently resides in Birmingham, Alabama.
- Cornelius Williams accepted a scholarship to play at Troy University. After spending a year as a graduate assistant with the football team at the University of South Alabama, Williams would become wide receiver coach at Jacksonville State in 2013. He would then become the wide receiver coach at UAB in 2014. After the UAB program shut down until 2017, he went back to his alma mater (Troy) as wide receiver coach until the end of the 2020-2021 season. Currently, Williams coaches wide receivers at Middle Tennessee.
- John C. "Goose" Dunham attended Alabama where he majored in chemical engineering and was a brother of the Phi Sigma Kappa fraternity. He never played football after high school. Dunham criticized the series in later years, saying MTV portrayed him as a "bad guy who tried to steal Kristin away," and the two were only friends. He has lost about 80 pounds since the show aired, and currently works as a shift supervisor at International Paper in Montgomery, Alabama.

== Season 2 ==
On September 27, 2006, Hoover City Schools and MTV announced plans for a second season of "Two-A-Days" that would air on January 30 at 10:30p (ET/PT). MTV sent out a film crew to Hoover to begin filming, starting with the Bucs' Week 6 game against John Curtis Christian High School of River Ridge, Louisiana. Then sixth-ranked John Curtis rallied from a 14-0 first quarter deficit to defeat top-ranked Hoover 28-14, led by high school All-American Joe McKnight. The game was nationally televised on ESPNU. Filming continued through the 2006 playoffs, which ended when Hoover lost 35-21 to Prattville High School in the Class 6A championship game, ending a streak of four straight state titles.

The 2007 senior football class, the focus of the second season of the show, was considered by some recruiters to be superior to the 2006 class portrayed in the series' first season, with wide receiver Brandon Clear, guard Patrick Crump, center Ryan Pugh, defensive end Byron Clear, and defensive tackle Josh Chapman all considered legitimate Division I prospects. Defensive Tackle Kerry Murphy had already announced his intention to attend the University of Alabama, making that announcement shortly after Nick Saban was named the Crimson Tide's new head coach. (Murphy later became a part of an investigation into possible changing of grades by Hoover High faculty, centering on Propst.)

Cast of Characters:

- Ross Wilson (#14) is a senior and the starting quarterback.
- Elliot Mayson is Ross's girlfriend and a varsity cheerleader. She is a junior.
- Brandon Clear (#18) is a senior and a wide receiver whose family moved to Hoover from Virginia so he could play for the Bucs.
- Byron Clear (#9) is a senior who plays defensive end. He is Brandon's twin brother.
- Michael DeJohn (#45) is a senior and a middle linebacker who is dating a girl named Jamie.
- Charlie Zorn (#6) is a senior and a wide receiver.
- Kristen Padalino is a peer adviser at Hoover and Charlie's off-and-on girlfriend.
- Mark McCarty (#52) is a senior and plays defensive end.
- Brittany Benton is a senior and captain of the cheerleading team at Hoover.

== Life after Season 2 ==
- Ross Wilson went on to play baseball for Alabama. He and Elliot, who also went to Alabama, are now married. Ross was drafted by the Chicago White Sox in the 10th round of the 2010 MLB draft and played minor league baseball for five years. His final stop was in the Atlanta Braves farm system. Ross said in later years that he hated the show, and was always worried about how MTV would portray him when editing the episodes.
- Charlie Zorn, despite poor grades, managed to get into Alabama and joined the Pi Kappa Alpha fraternity. He and Kristen broke up following high school, and he now works as a marketing coordinator in New York City.
- Mark McCarty attended Alabama after turning down scholarships from schools far away to stay close to home and near Brittany, however they broke up shortly after high school.
- Brittany graduated from Alabama and currently works as a freelance hair/makeup artist. She has since married.
- Brandon Clear and his twin brother Byron Clear both played football at Clemson University. Byron left Clemson after three years when he graduated early, and is currently a media producer in New York City. Brandon also played three years at Clemson, and then transferred to Illinois for his senior season.
- Michael DeJohn received scholarships from smaller schools to play football but went to Alabama as a walk-on. He is currently a real estate developer in Birmingham, and he and Jamie are no longer together.

== Rush Propst controversy ==
Coach Rush Propst was the subject of intense pressure after an investigation of charges that grades for some football players were changed, to allow them to meet eligibility regulations, and also came under fire for using ineligible players, which resulted in the Alabama High School Athletic Association forcing Hoover to forfeit four games. Propst came under further fire because of allegations of personal indiscretions, including extramarital affairs. On October 30, 2007, Propst resigned from the head coaching position of Hoover High School effective at the end of the season, while admitting to extramarital affairs and living a double life. Propst revealed he was married to two women and had children with both. Propst's time at Hoover officially ended on November 24, 2007, as Hoover lost to arch-rival Vestavia Hills in a state quarterfinal playoff game. In January 2008, Propst accepted the head coaching job at Colquitt County High School in Moultrie, Georgia.

In 2013, Propst returned to Hoover as coach of the Colquitt High School Packers to face off against the Bucs. Hoover won the game, 24–10. Prior to the game, Propst was featured on ESPN's E:60 series, where he revealed his extramarital affairs cost him a job with Nick Saban's coaching staff at Alabama, and he recently survived throat cancer. Propst remains in Georgia with Stefnie (the woman he had an affair with) and their children. Both Rush and Stefnie called their relationship "love at first sight."

== Season 3 ==
As Hoover High School continued to struggle with controversy over allegations of wrongdoings in its athletic program and in Propst's personal life, Humidity Entertainment declined to exercise its option for a third season. Instead, it announced that a similar program called Varsity Inc. would be filmed at West Monroe High School in West Monroe, Louisiana. The program was to be aired on ESPN2 and would focus more on the football program and less on the private lives of its players and coaches.

== Music ==
- The opening song was "The War" by Angels & Airwaves.
- The closing song for Season 1 was "Everything I've Ever Wanted" by Day at the Fair.
- The closing song for Season 2 was "Say Anything (Else)" by Cartel.

== Two-A-Days Basketball Edition ==
In 2007, the producers of Two-A-Days decided to create a basketball spin-off version of the original series. They chose Ballard High School in Louisville, Kentucky as the most desirable location because of the school's strong basketball tradition as well as the state of Kentucky's love of basketball. The crew started filming at the school for a short time until the Jefferson County Public School board rejected MTV's contract on the grounds that it would be a distraction to the school. Elizabethtown High School in Elizabethtown also allowed film crews to document the lives of another basketball season, but this was discontinued due to similar issues that JCPS had.
