= Hoover High School (Alabama) =

American public high school

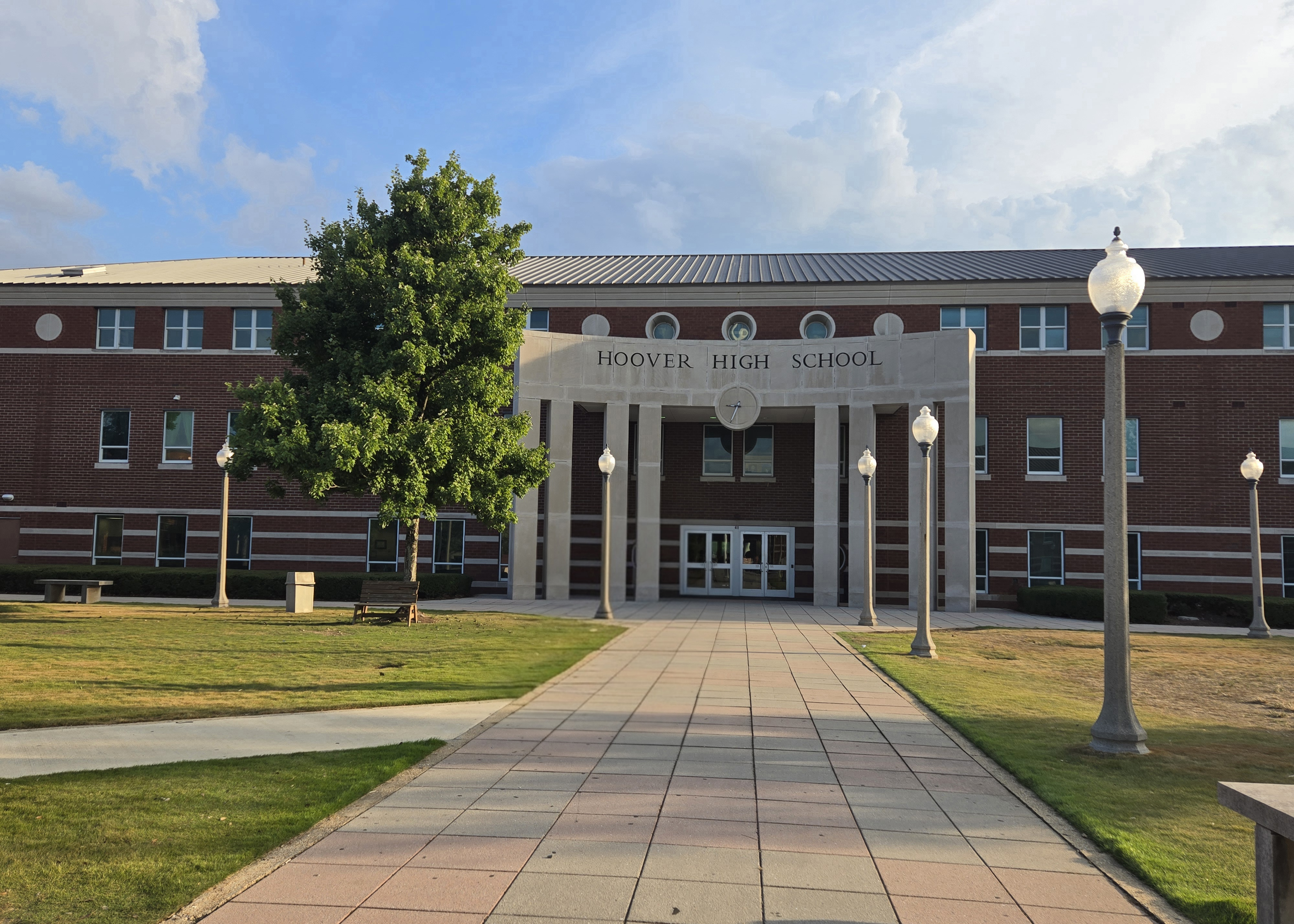

Location
- 1000 Buccaneer Drive; Hoover, Alabama 35244; United States; 33°20′39″N 86°50′16″W

Information
- Type: Public
- Established: 1994 (32 years ago)
- School district: Hoover City Schools
- CEEB code: 010328
- Principal: Kristi Sayers
- Teaching staff: 181.50 (FTE)
- Grades: 9-12
- Enrollment: 2,919 (2024-2025)
- Student to teacher ratio: 15.78
- Campus: Suburban
- Colors: Orange, Black, White
- Athletics: AHSAA Class 7A
- Nickname: Buccaneers (Bucs)
- Website: hhs.hoovercityschools.net

Hoover High School (HHS, formerly W.A. Berry High School) is a four-year public high school in the Birmingham, Alabama suburb of Hoover. It is one of two high schools in the Hoover City School System and one of three International Baccalaureate schools in the Birmingham-Hoover Metropolitan Area. The school colors are orange, black, and white, and the athletic teams are called the Buccaneers. Hoover competes in AHSAA Class 7A athletics.

Hoover is the largest high school in the state of Alabama, with an enrollment of 2,770 students. It is known for being featured in 2006 in the MTV reality television series, Two-A-Days.

== History ==
The origin of Hoover High School traces back to one of the older Jefferson County Schools, W.A. Berry High School. In the late 1960s only two high schools existed "over the hill" of Red Mountain and the further south Shades Mountain. These were Shades Valley High School established in Homewood in 1948, and Mountain Brook High School established in 1966. Shades Valley, also a Jefferson County School, began to rapidly grow in the late 1960s from a large population of people moving south of Birmingham. Mountain Brook was not growing near as rapidly due to high living cost and having an independent school system since their inception in 1966; prior to this, Mountain Brook was zoned for Shades Valley's pattern.

To offset the rapid student body growth in the city of Vestavia Hills, Cahaba Heights, now a neighborhood in Vestavia Hills, the unincorporated communities of Hoover, Bluff Park, and other unincorporated communities, Jefferson County Schools created a new school zone for the southern area of the county. W.A. Berry High School was built originally as an elementary school off of Columbiana Road in Hoover, opening in 1959. A grade was added every year starting with the seventh grade until the first high school age grade was added in 1962, with the last grade added in 1965, two years before the city of Hoover incorporated. However the cities of Vestavia Hills and Homewood began to question the logistics of financially supporting independent systems, with both separating from Jefferson County Schools in 1970 to create Homewood City Schools and Vestavia Hills City Schools, creating the independent Vestavia Hills High School in 1970 and Homewood High School in 1972. This pulled some of Shades Valley and Berry's feeder schools, including Pizitz Middle School which was a feeder school for Berry. Pizitz is the only school in the Vestavia Hills school district to have a different mascot than the Rebel, it continues to sport its Pirate mascot to pay homage to the Berry Buccaneers.

Through the 1970s and 1980s, Shades Valley saw massive growth, with Berry taking on even more tremendous growth with the other "over the hill" schools, which had gone from two high schools to five in less than six years. Primarily fueled by people desiring to leave the Birmingham City Schools, notably Woodlawn High School among others, the surrounding communities saw almost interstellar growth. The school was so popular to move to that classroom trailers filled the outside parking lot of the school to handle the excess population of students. The student to teacher ratio neared 40:1 during this time. In 1988 the city of Hoover (in large part due to the construction of the Riverchase Galleria in 1986 and massive land annexation efforts) left the Jefferson County School system to form Hoover City Schools. Several of the original feeders such as Simmons Middle School were brought into the new system.

The 1990s continued to see rapid growth in the city of Hoover, prompting the school district to build a new high school that opened in 1994. The new school was decided to be called Hoover High School, with the district electing to convert Berry into a new middle school instead. Still facing rapid growth and soon overcrowding at the new high school, the school board drafted new plans to build a second high school in the eastern areas of Hoover such as Inverness and Greystone that were rapidly expanding. These plans soon led to the opening of Spain Park High School in 2001, splitting much of Hoover High School's student body. Hoover retained Simmons and Bumpus middle schools as feeders, while Berry Middle School was rezoned as a feeder to Spain Park. In 2006, a new building was constructed for Berry next to Spain Park's campus to replace the original Columbiana Road school, leaving the old building unused. The Columbiana Road school after almost a decade of being vacant was de-annexed from Hoover to Vestavia Hills in 2016, soon being remodeled and opened in 2020 as the new Louis Pizitz Middle School for Vestavia Hills.

== Student profile ==
Enrollment in grades 9-12 for the 2013-14 school year is 2,770 students. Approximately 59% of students are white, 27% are African-American, 7% are Asian-American, 5% are Hispanic, and 2% are multiracial. Roughly 25% of students qualify for free or reduced price lunch.

Hoover has a graduation rate of 94%. Approximately 94% of its students meet or exceed proficiency standards in reading, and 96% meet or exceed standards in mathematics. The average ACT score for Hoover students is 26 and the average SAT composite is 1860.

== Athletics ==
=== Athletic teams ===
Hoover competes in AHSAA Class 7A athletics and fields teams in the following sports:

- Baseball
- Basketball
- Bowling
- Cheerleading
- Cross Country
- Football
- Golf
- Indoor Track & Field
- Outdoor Track & Field
- Soccer
- Softball
- Swimming and Diving
- Tennis
- Volleyball
- Wrestling

=== Championships ===
Hoover has won a total of over 100 state championships in the following sports:

- Girls' Volleyball (2020)
- Baseball (1972, 1981, 2008, 2017)
- Boys' basketball (2015, 2023, 2024)
- Girls' basketball (2001, 2010, 2012, 2013, 2017, 2019, 2021, 2022, 2023, 2024)
- Boys' cross country (1968, 1970, 1971, 1973, 1981, 1982, 1992, 1997, 1999, 2000, 2001, 2002, 2004, 2005, 2007)
- Football (1977, 1982, 2001, 2002, 2003, 2004, 2005, 2009, 2012, 2013, 2014, 2016, 2017)
- Boys' golf (1999, 2000, 2001, 2003)
- Girls' golf (1987, 2001, 2002, 2003, 2004, 2014, 2015)
- Boys' indoor track and field (1998, 2002, 2003, 2004, 2013, 2014, 2017, 2018)
- Girls' indoor track and field (1990, 2006, 2012, 2014, 2015)
- Boys' soccer (2003, 2019)
- Girls' soccer (1991, 1992, 1993)
- Softball (1997, 1998, 2001, 2002, 2004)
- Boys' swimming and diving (1969, 1970, 1971, 1972, 1973, 1997, 2000, 2001, 2002, 2003)
- Girls' swimming and diving (1969, 1970, 1994, 2010, 2011)
- Boys' tennis (1999, 2001, 2006)
- Boys' outdoor track and field (2005, 2009, 2010, 2011, 2012, 2014, 2015, 2022, 2023,2024,2026
- Girls' outdoor track and field (2004, 2006, 2010, 2012, 2013, 2014, 2015, 2016, 2017, 2022, 2023)
- Wrestling (1972, 2003, 2005, 2006, 2010)

== Performing arts ==
=== Band ===
==== Marching band ====
Hoover High School has two marching bands: competition and football. The football band performs during halftime of the Hoover games, while the competition band competes.

The Hoover High Competition Band won the 7A State Championship in 2019, 2021, and 2023 .

==== Concert band ====
Hoover High School has four concert bands: Concert II, Concert I, Symphonic Band, and Symphonic Winds.

==== Jazz band ====
There are three Jazz bands at Hoover High School: JB3, Hoover Jam, and the award-winning First Edition. First Edition has also received national recognition through its selection five times as a finalist in the Savannah Music Festival and as a finalist for the 2025 Essentially Ellington High School Jazz Band Competition and Festival. They have also played at the Midwest Clinic in Chicago multiple times.

=== Choir ===
Hoover High School has eight performing ensembles:

==== Class concert choirs ====
Hoover High School offers four curricular classroom choirs: Men's 9/10th grade Tenor/Bass Choir, Women's 9/10th grade Treble Choir, Junior Honor Choir, and Senior Honor Choir.

==== Paradigm show choir ====
Paradigm is a 38 member auditioned show choir made up of 10th–12th graders. They compete against other show choirs across the southeast during the late winter.

==== Chamber choir ====
The Hoover High School Chamber Choir is made up of almost 50 10th–12th graders. They perform advanced choral pieces through the year while only practicing once a week. They have been regarded as one of the best choirs in the state for over 30 years.

==== Grace Note ====
Grace Notes is one of Hoover High School's two a capella ensembles. Made up of twelve 10th12 grade girls, they perform pop pieces at mane events throughout the school year.

==== Ten Bucs Worth ====
Ten Bucs Worth is Hoover High Schools second a cappella ensemble. This group is recognized throughout the state as one of the best men's a capella groups. The group consists of ten 10th–12th graders.

== Controversy ==
Hoover High School became embroiled in controversy in the summer of 2007 over allegations that grades for certain athletes were changed to make them eligible for college sports under National Collegiate Athletic Association regulations. The charges center around players on the football team. Rush Propst, the Bucs' head coach, denied any wrongdoing, as did then-principal Richard Bishop. Hoover Superintendent Andy Craig appointed retired federal prosecutor Sam Pointer to investigate the charges. The report was released on October 12, 2007, and found that grades had been changed for two athletes, along with various other issues. (The report can be seen on the school website.)

On July 25, 2007, the Hoover School Board voted to not renew Bishop's contract after one year of service. The action was based largely on a less-than-satisfactory performance assessment by a former assistant superintendent. Dr. Ken Jarnagin was named the interim principal; he started the previous month as the school system's chief academic officer.

Hoover High School again came under public scrutiny in October 2007 after reports that a player failed to properly transfer from Hanceville High School. The AHSAA investigation resulted in the forfeiture of all games in which he played, reducing the team record from 6-1 to 2-5 at the time. The Bucs still qualified for the post-season playoffs, however.

The state director of K-12 accreditation for the Southern Association of Colleges and Schools announced his concern with the leadership at Hoover High. SACS asked for and received an outline of the changes necessary to fix the problems in order for the school to retain its accreditation.

== Notable alumni ==
- Eric Adams, professional basketball player
- Robby Ashford, college football player
- Murry Bartow, basketball coach at University of South Florida, formerly at the University of Alabama at Birmingham and East Tennessee State University
- Jeff Brantley, baseball pitcher, former ESPN baseball analyst, current Cincinnati Reds analyst
- Josh Chapman, former defensive tackle at the University of Alabama and Indianapolis Colts
- Ricky Dillon, YouTube personality
- Hannah Godwin, The Bachelor contestant and YouTube personality
- Taylor Hicks, 2006 American Idol winner
- Marlon Humphrey, cornerback for the Baltimore Ravens and University of Alabama
- Chad Jackson, wide receiver for the Denver Broncos and New England Patriots
- Trey Jemison, professional basketball player
- Reniya Kelly, basketball player
- Mike Kolen, linebacker for the Miami Dolphins and Auburn University
- Steve Lowery, PGA Tour golfer
- Kerry Murphy, former defensive tackle at the University of Alabama
- Hoda Muthana, New Jersey-born woman who traveled to Syria in 2014 to join ISIS
- Will Pearson, founder and publisher of Mental Floss magazine
- George Pickens, wide receiver for the Dallas Cowboys
- Tristan Purifoy, National Arena League wide receiver for the Columbus Lions
- Cory Reamer, former linebacker at the University of Alabama
- Will Reichard, kicker for the Minnesota Vikings
- Rob Selby, former offensive tackle for the Philadelphia Eagles and Arizona Cardinals
- Sidney Spencer, forward for the 2006-07 NCAA champion Lady Volunteers of the University of Tennessee and the WNBA's Los Angeles Sparks and Phoenix Mercury
- Stan White, former quarterback for Auburn University
- Heather Whitestone, 1995 Miss America
- Cornelius Williams, former wide receiver and current wide receivers coach for Middle Tennessee State University
- John Parker Wilson, former quarterback & current color broadcast commentator for the University of Alabama
- Jahi Word-Daniels, former safety for the San Francisco 49ers, the Detroit Lions, and the Virginia Destroyers
