= Bessemer Airport =

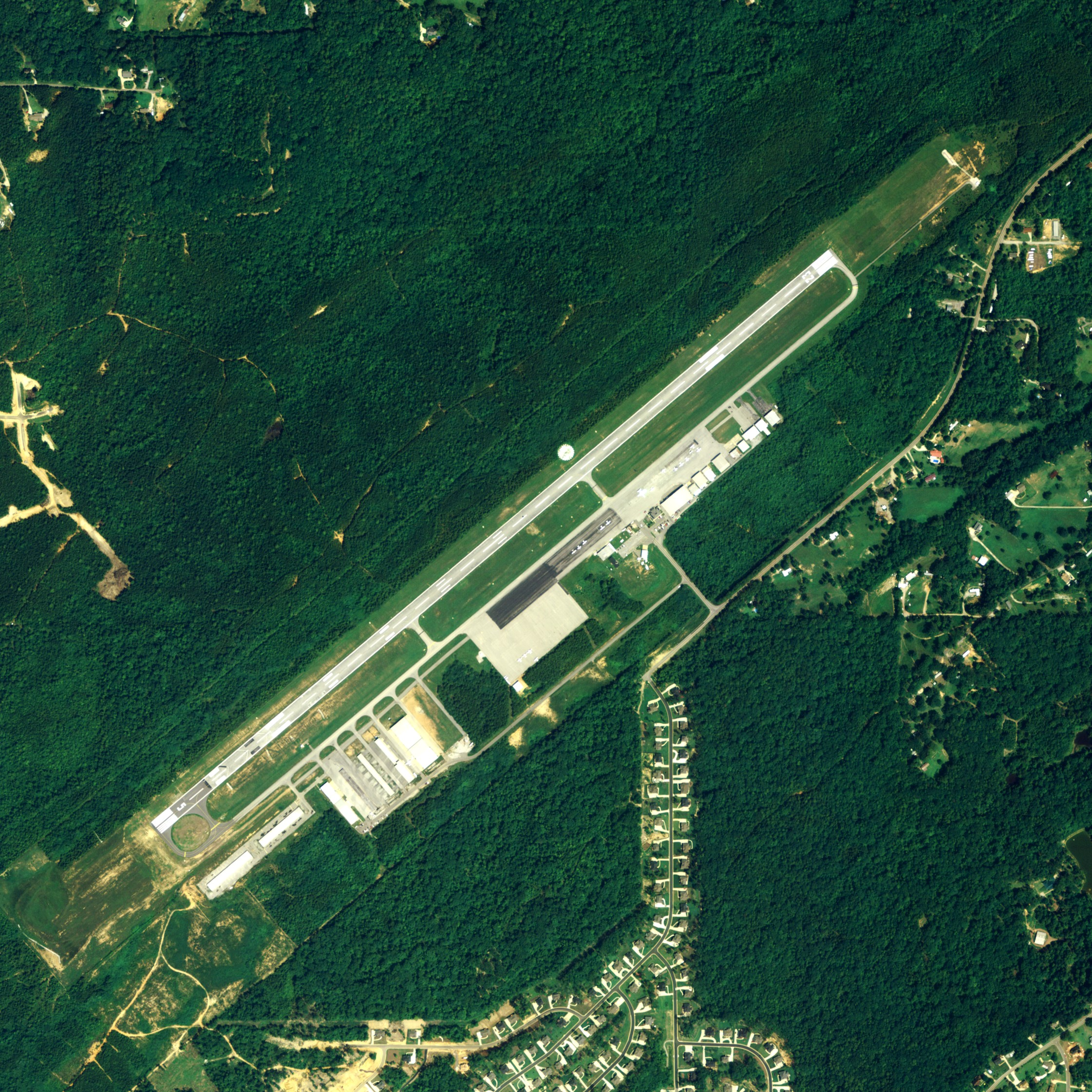
- NAIP aerial image, 2006
- IATA: none; ICAO: KEKY; FAA LID: EKY

Summary
- Airport type: Public
- Owner: City of Bessemer
- Serves: Bessemer, Alabama
- Elevation AMSL: 700 ft (210 m)
- Coordinates: 33°18′45″N 086°55′35″W
- Website: https://www.bessemerairportauthority.com/

Map
- Location of airport in Alabama EKY (the United States)

Runways
Direction	Length		Surface
Direction	ft	m	Surface
5/23	6,007	1,831	Asphalt

Statistics (2017)
- Aircraft operations (2016): 102,600
- Based aircraft: 117
- Source: Federal Aviation Administration

Bessemer Airport (ICAO: KEKY, FAA LID: EKY, formerly 2A3) is a city-owned public-use airport located three nautical miles (6 km) southeast of the central business district of Bessemer, a city in Jefferson County, Alabama, United States. According to the FAA's National Plan of Integrated Airport Systems for 2009–2013, it is categorized as a reliever airport for the Birmingham-Shuttlesworth International Airport.

Although many U.S. airports use the same three-letter location identifier for the FAA and IATA, this facility is assigned EKY by the FAA but has no designation from the IATA.

On Jan, 2025 Bessemer Municipal Airport (EKY) was reclassified as a National Airport, signifying a significant milestone in its role within the National Plan of Integrated Airport Systems (NPIAS). This reclassification enhances the airport’s capacity to accommodate larger aircraft and increased air traffic, further supporting regional and national aviation infrastructure.

== Facilities and aircraft ==
Bessemer Airport covers an area of 380 acres (150 ha) at an elevation of 700 feet (213 m) above mean sea level. It has one runway designated 5/23 with an asphalt surface measuring 6,007 by 100 feet (1,831 x 30 m). An instrument landing system was installed in 2000. The airport received funding to expand the runway from 5,700 feet (1,737 m). A Civil Air Patrol squadron also operates from this airport.

For the 12-month period ending January 27, 2010, the airport had 102,600 general aviation aircraft operations, an average of 281 per day. At that time there were 99 aircraft based at this airport: 70% single-engine, 20% multi-engine, 7% jet and 3% helicopter.

== See also ==
- List of airports in Alabama
