= Hoover, Alabama =

City in Alabama, United States

- City
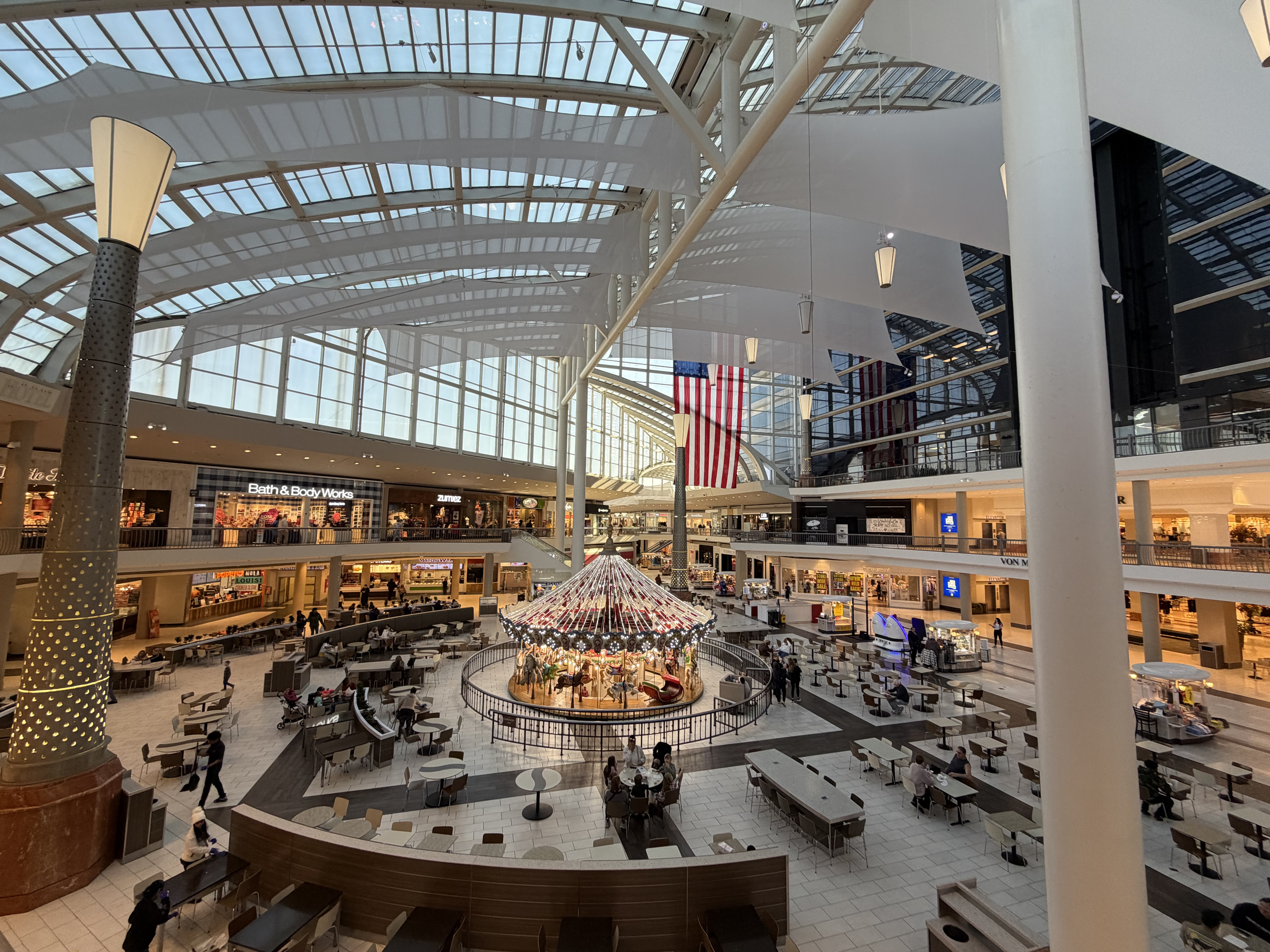
- Riverchase Galleria

- Flag Seal Logo

- Location of Hoover in Jefferson County and Shelby County, Alabama
- Coordinates: 33°23′11″N 86°48′18″W
- Country: United States
- State: Alabama
- Counties: Jefferson, Shelby
- Settled: 1853
- Founded: 1954
- Incorporated: April 28, 1967
- Incorporated: May 18, 1967
- Named for: William H. Hoover

Government
  - Mayor: Nick Derzis

Area
  - City: 50.326 sq mi (130.344 km^{2})
  - Land: 49.354 sq mi (127.827 km^{2})
  - Water: 0.972 sq mi (2.518 km^{2})
- Elevation: 495 ft (151 m)

Population (2020)
  - City: 92,606
  - Estimate (2022): 92,435
  - Rank: US: 367th AL: 6th
  - Density: 1,874/sq mi (723.5/km^{2})
  - Urban: 774,956 (US: 58th)
  - Urban density: 1,522/sq mi (587.5/km^{2})
  - Metro: 1,181,196 (US: 47th)
  - Metro density: 248.8/sq mi (96.07/km^{2})
  - Combined: 1,362,731 (US: 43rd)
  - Combined density: 200.3/sq mi (77.35/km^{2})
- Time zone: UTC−6 (Central (CST))
  - Summer (DST): UTC−5 (CDT)
- ZIP Codes: 35022, 35080, 35124, 35142, 35216, 35222, 35226, 35236, 35242, 35244
- Area codes: 205 and 659
- FIPS code: 01-35896
- GNIS feature ID: 2404725
- Website: hooveralabama.gov

Hoover is a city in Jefferson and Shelby Counties in north central Alabama, United States. The sixth-largest city in Alabama, its population was 92,606 at the 2020 census. Hoover is part of the Birmingham metropolitan statistical area and is also included in the Birmingham-Cullman-Talladega combined statistical area. Hoover's territory is along the foothills of the Appalachian Mountains.

The Birmingham Barons Minor League Baseball team, which traces its history to 1885, played its home games at the 10,800-seat Hoover Metropolitan Stadium from 1988 through 2013, when it moved to Regions Field in the Parkside District of Birmingham.

== History ==
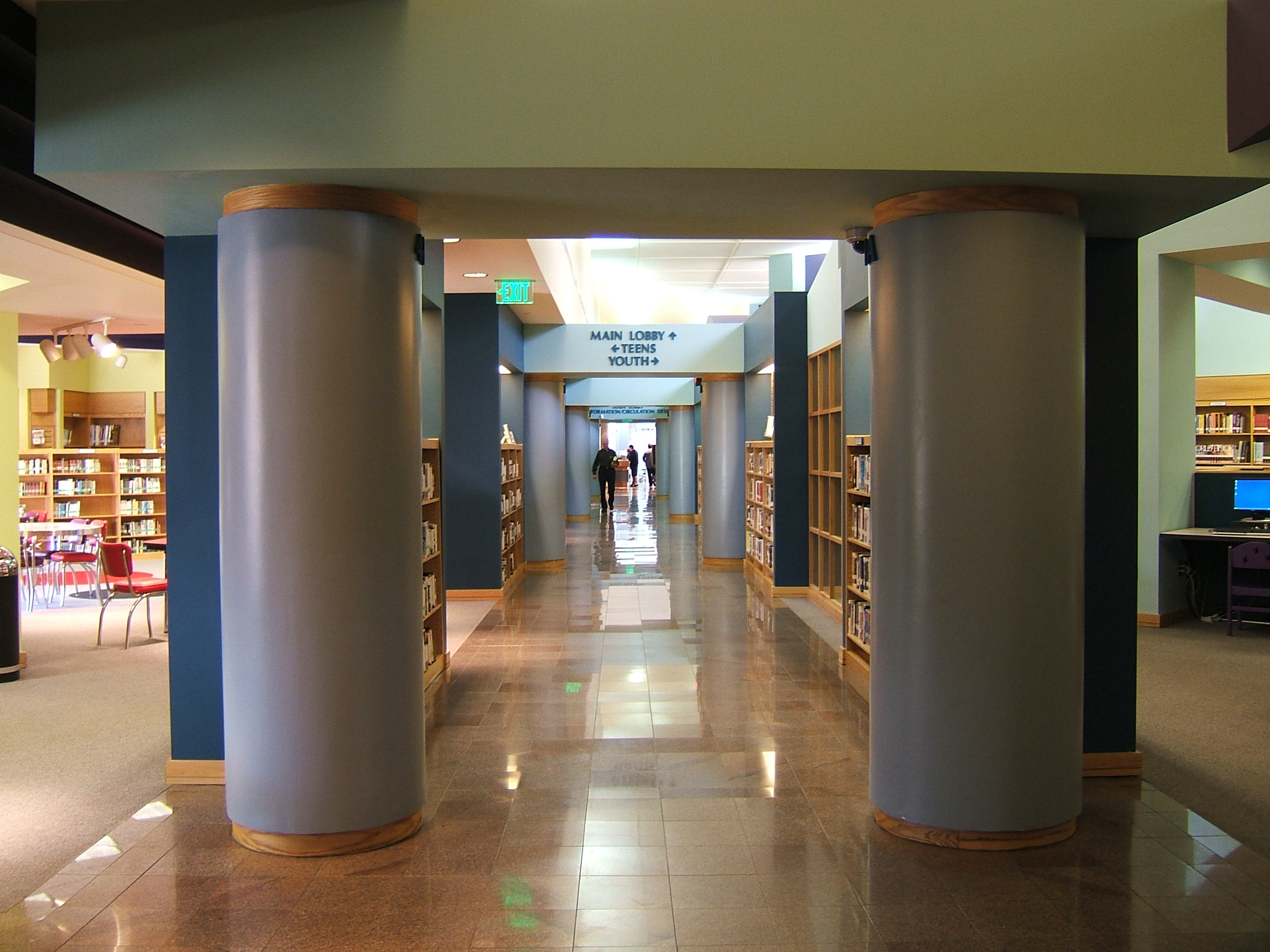
Hoover Public Library, 2007

This suburban area near the foothills of the Appalachian Mountains had been known as the Green Valley community since the 1930s; it was mostly a bedroom or residential community into the late 1970s and early 1980s. The City of Hoover was incorporated in 1967, named for William H. Hoover (1890–1979), a local insurance company owner.

On September 8, 1980, the city annexed the Riverchase business and residential community, gaining large office buildings, employers, and workers to increase the city's tax base. When Interstate 459 was opened, a major interchange with Interstate 65 was constructed within the borders of Hoover, improving access.

In 1986, the Riverchase Galleria multiuse complex opened; it has significantly increased the tax revenue for the city. It has also attracted new residents and businesses to the area. The city has grown extremely fast, aided by its annexations of territory and building new developments. The city has expanded its facilities and now operates a Municipal Center, Library, and Public Safety Center. The city expects to continue to increase in population, which has risen significantly since 2008. It numbered 92,606 as of the 2020 census.

== Geography ==
According to the United States Census Bureau, the city has a total area of 50.326 square miles (130.34 km^{2}), of which 0.972 sq mi (2.52 km^{2}) is covered by water.

Many major highways pass through the city limits, including I-65, I-459, and U.S. Route 31. Via I-65 or US-31, downtown Birmingham is 11 mi (18 km) north, and Montgomery is 82 mi (132 km) south. Via I-459, Atlanta, GA is 152 mi (245 km) east, and Tuscaloosa is 53 mi (85 km) west.

== Government ==
The municipal government has operated under the mayor-council form of government since incorporation. The mayor and city council are elected on a nonpartisan basis to concurrent four-year terms of office, which begin on first Monday in November of election year. Policy-making and legislative authority is vested in the city council, which consists of seven, at-large-elected members. (Prior to 2004, the council consisted of five at-large members; candidates for at-large elections must gain a majority of voters.)

The city council is responsible for considering local resolutions and ordinances, adopting an annual budget, and appointing members to local boards and committees. The mayor is responsible for carrying out and enforcing the city's policies and ordinances.

Current mayor
Nicholas Derzis
Current city council
Council place	Representative	Position
1	Robin Schultz	Councilor
2	Gene Smith	Councilor
3	Ashley Lovell	Councilor
4	Khristi Driver	Council president pro-tem
5	Derrick Murphy	Councilor
6	Casey Middlebrooks	Council president
7	Steve McClinton	Councilor

== Economy ==
The Riverchase Galleria shopping-hotel-office complex generates tax revenues for the city; it is also the location of numerous retail, hotel, and office workers. The Riverchase Office Park, and other office parks and buildings throughout Hoover, house many large corporations. Major shopping centers in the city include Riverchase Galleria on US 31, Patton Creek on SR 150, and Village at Lee Branch on US 280. The Central Business District is intersected by US 31, SR 150, and US 280. I-65 and I-459 intersect in the city.

=== Top employers ===
According to the city's 2022 Comprehensive Annual Financial Report, the largest employers in the city are:

#	Employer	# of Employees
1	Regions Bank	2,644
2	Hoover City Schools	1,869
3	Blue Cross and Blue Shield of Alabama	1,711
4	AT&T of Alabama	1,170
5	Walmart and Sam's Club	950
6	Publix	868
7	McLeod Software	700
8	City of Hoover	667
9	SS&C Health	438
10	Doster Construction	184

== Public safety ==
Hoover
- Crime rates* (2022)

Violent crimes
- Homicide: 2
- Rape: 18
- Robbery: 13
- Aggravated assault: 59
- Total violent crime: 92

Property crimes
- Burglary: 115
- Larceny-theft: 1,304
- Motor vehicle theft: 80
- Arson: 1
- Total property crime: 1,500
- Note: Reported crimes per 100,000 population Source: 2022 FBI UCR Data

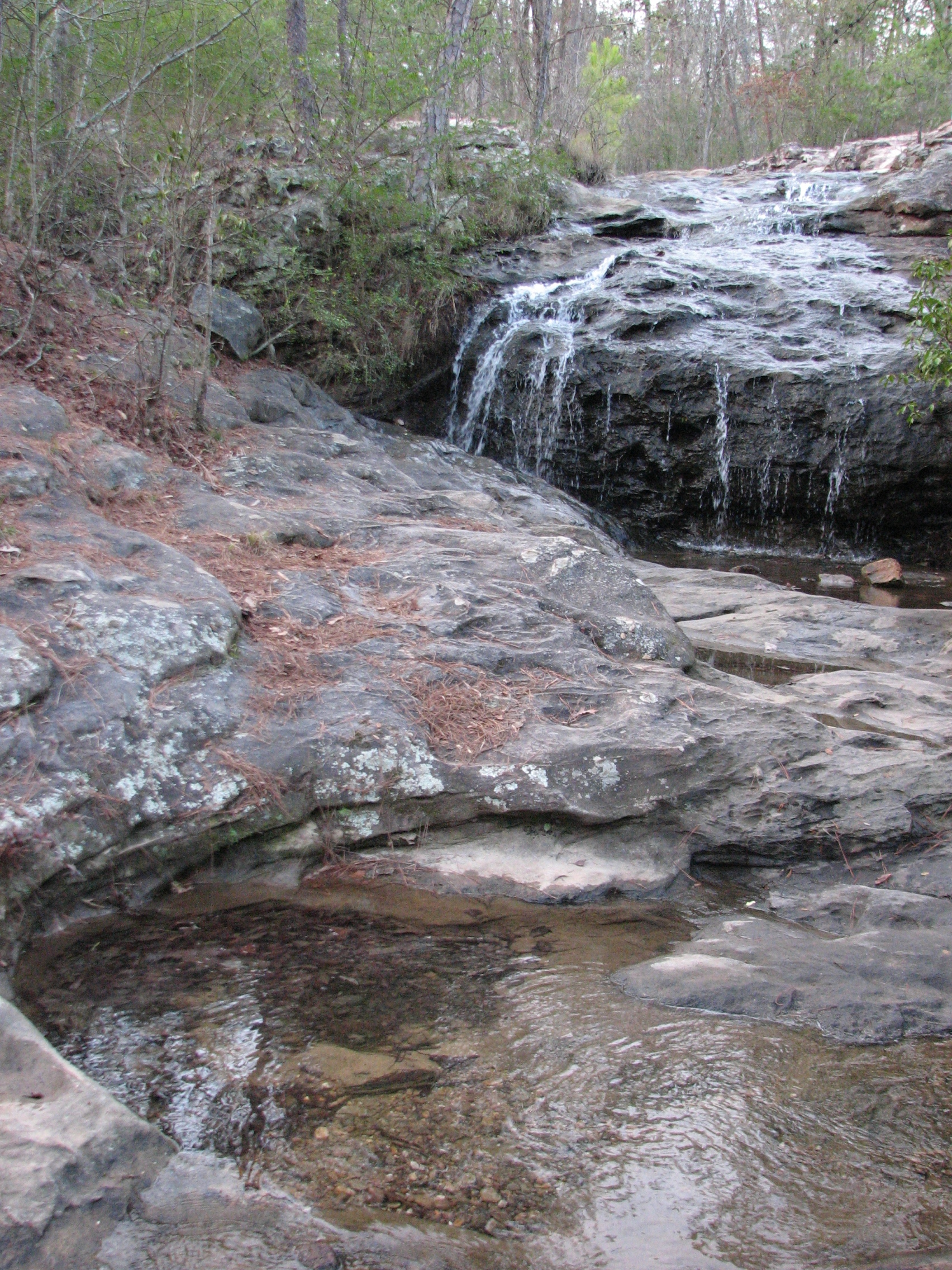
The falls at Moss Rock Preserve

Hoover Fire Department is a full-time career department operating from 11 fire stations throughout the city. The city has one battalion, with nine engine companies, two quints, one ladder truck, five ALS rescue/ambulances, and two battalion chief cars. All engine companies are staffed with a minimum of three people, with at least two being firefighter/paramedics. All engines are classified for advanced life support. The department also operates one heavy rescue truck, and one hazmat unit. Hoover Fire Department holds a Class 1 ISO rating. In 2016, the department responded to over 10,000 calls.

Hoover operates its own enhanced 911 emergency call center, which has 24 operator positions, five emergency communication supervisors, two emergency communication managers, and one director, and is staffed continuously.

Hoover provides traffic, severe weather, disaster information, and details on special events on low-power AM radio (1610 kHz).

== Demographics ==
Historical population
Census	Pop.	Note	%±
1970	688		—
1980	18,996		2,661.0%
1990	39,788		109.5%
2000	62,742		57.7%
2010	81,619		30.1%
2020	92,606		13.5%
2025 (est.)	93,550	▲	1.0%
U.S. Decennial Census; 2020 Census

=== Racial and ethnic composition ===
Hoover, Alabama – Racial and ethnic composition Note: the US Census treats Hispanic/Latino as an ethnic category. This table excludes Latinos from the racial categories and assigns them to a separate category. Hispanics/Latinos may be of any race.
Race / Ethnicity (NH = non-Hispanic)	Pop 2000	Pop 2010	Pop 2020	% 2000	% 2010	% 2020
White alone (NH)	53,616	59,254	62,841	85.45%	72.60%	67.86%
Black or African American alone (NH)	4,230	12,008	15,513	6.74%	14.71%	16.75%
Native American or Alaska Native alone (NH)	76	143	114	0.12%	0.18%	0.12%
Asian alone (NH)	1,811	4,120	5,913	2.89%	5.05%	6.39%
Native Hawaiian or Pacific Islander alone (NH)	16	16	17	0.03%	0.02%	0.02%
Other race alone (NH)	51	123	333	0.08%	0.15%	0.36%
Multiracial (NH)	562	1,040	3,171	0.90%	1.27%	3.42%
Hispanic or Latino (any race)	2,380	4,915	4,704	3.79%	6.02%	5.08%
Total	62,742	81,619	92,606	100.00%	100.00%	100.00%

=== 2020 census ===
As of the 2020 census, Hoover had a population of 92,606. The median age was 39.2 years; 22.7% of residents were under 18 and 17.2% were 65 or older. For every 100 females, there were 90.8 males, and for every 100 females 18 and over, there were 87.0 males 18 and over.

The population density was 1,926.6 inhabitants per square mile (744/km^{2}). Of the 36,799 households (with 25,337 families) in Hoover, 32.3% had children under 18 living in them, 54.7% were married-couple households, 14.6% were households with a male householder and no spouse or partner present, and 27.2% were households with a female householder and no spouse or partner present. About 26.8% of all households were made up of individuals, and 10.1% had someone living alone who was 65 or older.

The city had 39,008 housing units, of which 5.7% were vacant. The homeowner vacancy rate was 1.3% and the rental vacancy rate was 9.6%.

About 99.4% of residents lived in urban areas, while 0.6% lived in rural areas.

Racial composition as of the 2020 census
Race	Number	Percentage
White	63,664	68.7%
Black or African American	15,621	16.9%
American Indian and Alaska Native	254	0.3%
Asian	5,929	6.4%
Native Hawaiian and other Pacific Islander	20	0.0%
Some other race	1,940	2.1%
Two or more races	5,178	5.6%
Hispanic or Latino (of any race)	4,704	5.1%

=== 2010 census ===
As of the 2010 census, 81,619 people in 32,478 households, including 22,476 families, were in the city. The population density was 1,870.3 inhabitants per square mile (722.1/km^{2}). The 35,474 housing units had an average density of 812.9 per square mile (313.9/km^{2}). The racial makeup of the city was 75.1% White, 14.8% Black, 0.2% Native American, 5.1% Asian, 0.0% Pacific Islander, 3.2% from other races, and 1.5% from two or more races; 6.0% of the population were Hispanic or Latino of any race.

Of the 32,478 households, 33.0% had children under 18 living with them, 56.1% were married couples living together, 10.0% had a female householder with no husband present, and 30.8% were not families. About 25.8% of households were one person, and 7.6% were one person 65 or older. The average household size was 2.50, and the average family size was 3.02.

The age distribution was 25.0% under 18, 7.8% from 18 to 24, 28.7% from 25 to 44, 26.6% from 45 to 64, and 12.0% 65 or older. The median age was 37 years. For every 100 females, there were 92.5 males. For every 100 females 18 and over, there were 92.4 males.

The median household income was $72,960 and the median family income was $94,066. Males had a median income of $65,023 versus $44,525 for females. The per capita income for the city was $39,141. About 3.4% of families and 5.6% of the population were below the poverty line, including 6.6% of those under 18 and 3.5% of those 65 or over.

=== 2000 census ===
As of the 2000 census, 62,742 people in 25,191 households, including 17,406 families, lived in the city. The population density was 1,454.6 inhabitants per square mile (561.6/km^{2}). There were 27,150 housing units at an average density of 629.4 per square mile (243.0/km^{2}). The racial makeup of the city was 87.66% White, 6.77% Black, 0.16% Native American, 2.89% Asian, 0.03% Pacific Islander, 1.40% from other races, and 1.09% from two or more races. 3.79% of the population were Hispanic or Latino of any race.

Of the 25,191 households, 33.4% had children under 18 living with them, 59.4% were married couples living together, 7.2% had a female householder with no husband present, and 30.9% were not families. About 25.9% of households were one person and 6.3% were one person 65 or older. The average household size was 2.47 and the average family size was 3.00.

The age distribution was 24.8% under 18, 7.9% from 18 to 24, 32.6% from 25 to 44, 23.8% from 45 to 64, and 10.9% 65 or older. The median age was 36 years. For every 100 females, there were 95.1 males. For every 100 females 18 and over, there were 91.5 males.

According to a 2007 estimate, The median household income was $75,365, and the median family income was $89,513. Males had a median income of $55,660 versus $34,836 for females. The per capita income for the city was $33,361. About 2.1% of families and 3.4% of the population were below the poverty line, including 2.7% of those under 18 and 3.9% of those 65 or over.

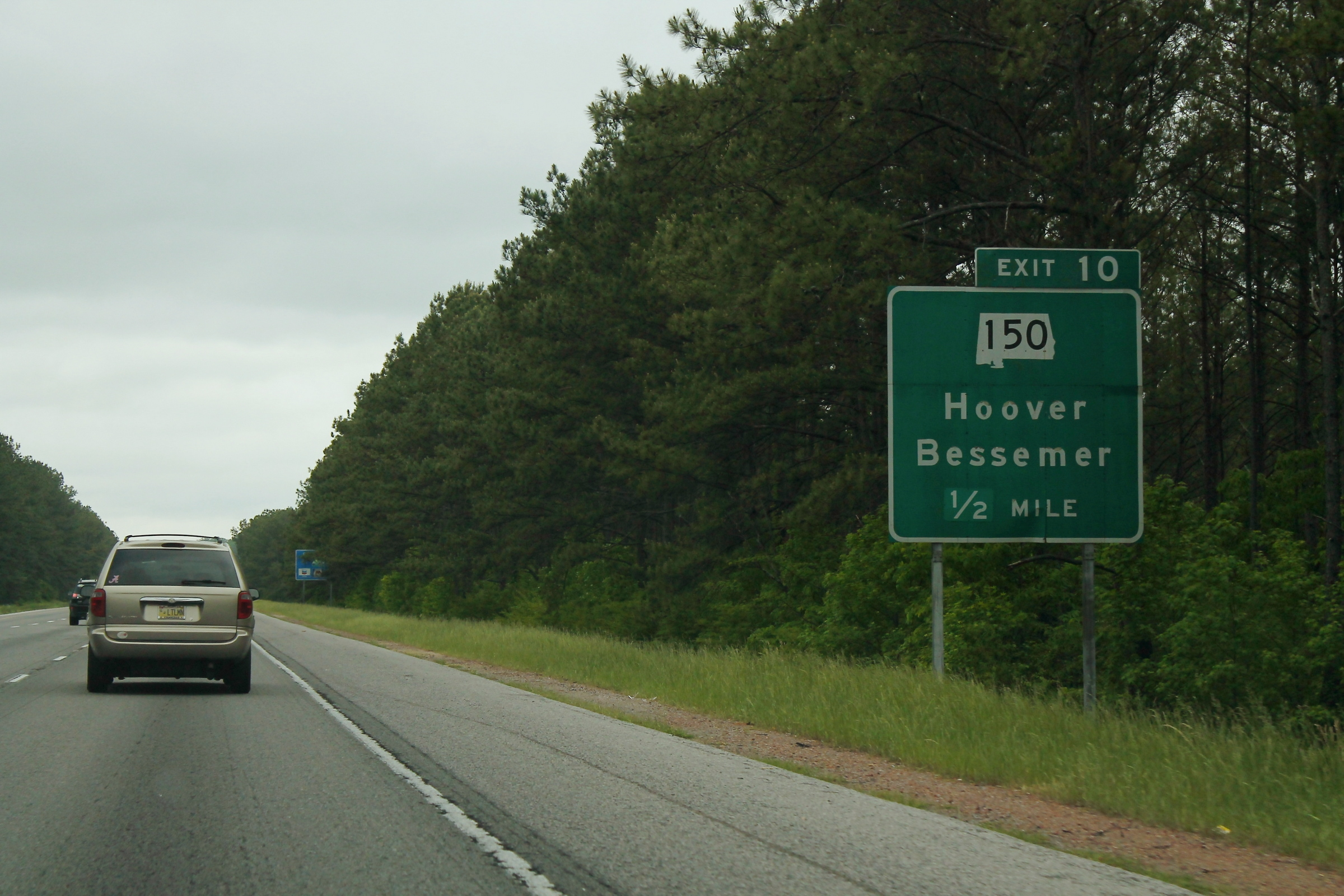
A sign designating the exit to Hoover on Interstate 459

== Transportation ==
Hoover is served by two interstate highways, 65 and 459, with a major interchange near the center of the city. Major arterial roads include U.S. Route 31 as a north–south route through the middle of the city, U.S. Route 280 in the eastern portion of the city, Route 150 as an east–west road connecting the city center to the western side, and Valleydale Road connecting Route 31 and Route 280. Hoover is also served by the Birmingham-Jefferson County Transit Authority.

== Communities ==
- Acton
- Altadena
- Blackridge
- Bluff Park
- Caldwell Mill
- Chace Lake
- Country Club Highlands
- Deer Valley
- Everlee
- Georgetown
- Green Valley
- Greystone
- Inverness
- Lake Crest
- Lake Cyrus
- Lake Wilborn
- Patton Chapel
- Pinewood
- Riverchase
- Rocky Ridge
- Ross Bridge
- Russet Woods
- Shades Mountain
- Shoal Creek
- Southlake
- The Preserve
- Trace Crossings

== Parks ==
- Aldridge Gardens
- Bluff Park Community Center and Playground
- Blue Ridge Park
- Georgetown Park
- Howard Lake Park
- Inverness Park
- Loch Haven Park
- Moss Rock Preserve
- Ross Park
- Russet Woods Park
- Star Lake Park
- Sertoma Park
- Veterans Park
- Wildflower Park
- Chace Lake Park

== Education ==
=== Primary and secondary schools ===
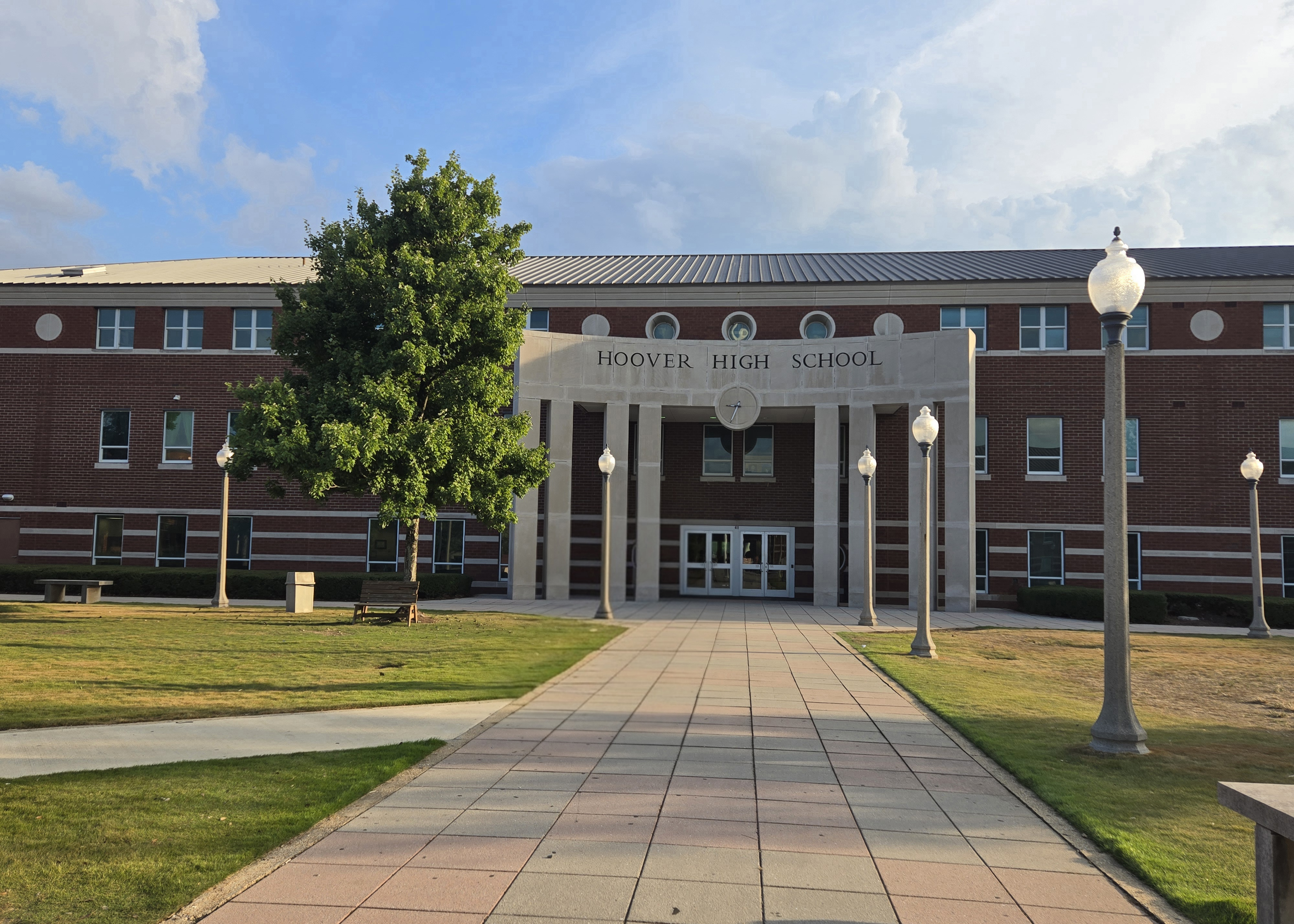
Hoover High School

Hoover is served by Hoover City Schools. It has ten elementary schools, three middle schools, and two high schools, Spain Park High School and Hoover High School. Both schools have ranked high for excellent academics, being rated close to the top five hundred schools in the country. During the 2022–2023 school year, some 2,841 students enrolled in Hoover High School, 1,503 in Spain Park High School, with a total of 13,557 students in the Hoover City School system. Spain Park received the National Blue Ribbon Award in 2008.

Berry Middle School, which served as the city's first high school before the present Hoover High was constructed, was closed after the 2005–2006 academic year. Students were moved to a new Berry Middle School constructed near the site of Spain Park High School. A poll of residents in 2007 favored selling the school, possibly to the independent Shades Mountain Christian School. Simmons Middle School and Bumpus Middle School are the city's other middle schools.

Given the population expansion, the city built Riverchase Elementary to relieve overcrowding of some schools. The student population bubble is advancing in the system, and in the 2011–2012 academic year, Bumpus Middle School and its students were relocated to the former freshman center of Hoover High School. The former Bumpus site became Brock's Gap Intermediate School in 2011. The former Berry site became the current Bumpus Middle School in 2011. Brock's Gap served 5th and 6th graders until 2018 when Hoover Rezoning went into effect. They now serve 3rd, 4th, and 5th graders. Bumpus Middle School served only 7th and 8th graders until 2018 because of Hoover Rezoning. They now serve 6th, 7th, and 8th graders.

=== Colleges and universities ===
The Shelby-Hoover campus of the Jefferson State Community College is in Shelby County, is in Hoover, near Spain Park High School. Faulkner University has a campus on Valleydale Road; The University of Alabama in Birmingham (UAB) in downtown Birmingham is only 8–10 miles away, and features the premier medical school of Alabama.

=== Miscellaneous education ===
The Birmingham Supplementary School Inc. (BSS, バーミングハム日本語補習校 Bāminguhamu Nihongo Hoshūkō), a part-time Japanese school, holds its classes at the Shelby-Hoover campus. Its office is at the Honda Manufacturing of Alabama, LLC facility in unincorporated Talladega County, near Lincoln. The school opened on September 1, 2001.

== Media ==
Hoover has one television station, WBMA, branded as ABC 33/40, with its studio within the Hoover city limits. The metro area has TV broadcasting stations that serve the Birmingham-Anniston-Tuscaloosa Designated Market Area (DMA), as defined by Nielsen Media Research. Charter Communications, Bright House Networks, and AT&T U-verse provide cable television service to specific communities in Hoover. DirecTV and Dish Network provide direct broadcast satellite television, including both local and national channels.

No radio stations operate from Hoover, although residents are served by numerous stations from the Birmingham market. (WERC-FM is licensed to Hoover but its studio is located in Birmingham.)

Two newspapers serve Hoover: the Over the Mountain Journal newspaper, published twice monthly and delivered for free to select neighborhoods in Hoover and nearby communities; and the Hoover Sun, published monthly and mailed for free to roughly 24,000 homes and businesses in Hoover.

Enjoy Hoover, a 6x/year magazine, is distributed freely at hundreds of locations throughout the city, editorially focused on dining, entertainment, shopping, and healthy living in Hoover.

== Notable people ==
- Ben Chapman, was an outfielder and manager in Major League Baseball.
- Marlon Humphrey, National Football League corner back for the Baltimore Ravens
- Hoda Muthana was attending University of Alabama at Birmingham before joining ISIS
- Gary Palmer, representative from Alabama's 6th congressional district
- George Pickens, National Football League wide receiver for the Dallas Cowboys
- Chris Richards, American professional soccer player

== Points of interest ==
- Aldridge Botanical Gardens
- Hoover Metropolitan Stadium (formerly Regions Park), home of the SEC baseball tournament
- Riverchase Galleria
- Moss Rock Preserve
- The Library Theatre
