= Swan (surname) =

Swan is an English surname. Notable people with the surname include:

== Academics ==
- Daniel C. Swan, American cultural anthropologist and museum curator
- Donald A. Swan (1935–1981), American anthropologist
- Janis Swan, American-New Zealand food process engineering academic
- Richard Swan (born 1933), American mathematician
- Toril Swan (1945–2022), Norwegian philologist
- Trevor Swan (1918–1989), Australian economist
- Vivien Swan (1943–2009), British archaeologist

== Arts, entertainment, and literature ==
- Alfred Swan (1890–1970), Russian composer and musicologist
- Alison Swan (fl. 1988–2015), Bermudian filmmaker, writer, and real estate developer
- Annalyn Swan (born c. 1951), American writer
- Anni Swan (1875–1958), Finnish writer
- Astrid Swan (1982–), Finnish musician and singer
- Barbara Swan (1922–2003), American artist
- Curt Swan (1920–1996), American comics artist
- Einar Aaron Swan (1903–1940), American musician, arranger and composer
- Erinn Swan (born 1984), Australian singer, songwriter, and performer
- Fred Swan, American painter
- Hash Swan (born 1995), South Korean rapper
- Jon Swan (fl. 2010), American poet, playwright, librettist, journalist, and editor
- Jonathan Swan (fl. 2014–2018), Australian journalist
- Kal Swan (born 1963), Scottish–born vocalist
- Kitty Swan (born 1943), Danish actress
- Lucile Swan American sculptor and painter
- Nathaniel Walter Swan (1834–1884), Irish-born Australian writer
- Serinda Swan (born 1984), Canadian actress

== Politics ==
- Almon Swan (1819–1883), member of the Wisconsin State Assembly, United States
- Andrew Swan (born 1968), politician in Manitoba, Canada
- Benjamin Swan (fl. 2013–2014), state legislator, Massachusetts, United States
- Denise Swan (born 1947), Australian politician
- George Swan (politician) (1833–1913), New Zealand businessman and Member of Parliament
- Herbert Swan (1869–1949), Australian trade unionist and politician
- Wayne Swan (1954–), Australian politician, Treasurer of Australia (2007–2013)
- Yvonne Swan (born 1943), Sinixt Native American activist, and a once convicted criminal.

== Sports ==
- Adrian Swan (1932–2006), Australian figure skater
- Chris Swan (born 1978), Australian cricketer
- Chris Swan (footballer) (1900–1979), English footballer
- Colton Swan (born 1980), American football coach
- Craig Swan (born 1950), American baseball pitcher
- Dane Swan (born 1984), Australian footballer
- Derek Swan (born 1966), Irish footballer
- Fred H. Swan (1902–1993), American football player and coach
- Gavin Swan (born 1970), Australian cricketer
- George Swan (footballer) (born 1994), English footballer
- Glenn Swan (born 1952), Australian rules footballer
- Graeme Swan, retired English spinner
- Harry Swan (1887–1946), American baseball pitcher
- Henry Swan (cricketer) (1879–1941), English cricketer
- Ian Swan (1930–2004), Scottish international rugby union player
- Isabel Swan (1983–), Brazilian sailor
- Katie Swan (born 1999), British tennis player
- Lianna Swan (born 1997), British-Pakistani swimmer
- Lynn Swann (born 1952), American football player
- Raymond Swan (born 1938), Bermudian long-distance runner

== Other people ==
- Bill or Billy Swan, see William Swan (disambiguation)
- Carole Swan (fl. 2007–2011), Canadian public servant, President of the Canadian Food Inspection Agency
- Charles Swan (disambiguation)
- Charlie Swan (disambiguation)
- Conrad Swan (1924–2019), officer of arms at the College of Arms, London, England
- Guy Swan (born 1954), United States Army Lft. general
- Henry Harrison Swan (1840–1916), United States federal judge
- Hepzibah Swan (died 1825), American heiress, married to James Swan (financier)
- James Swan (disambiguation)
- Jeremy Swan (1922–2005), Irish cardiologist
- Jimmy Swan, see James Swan (disambiguation)
- John Swan (disambiguation)
- Joseph Swan (disambiguation)
- Peter Swan (disambiguation)
- William Swan (disambiguation)

== Fictional characters ==
- Bella Swan, from the Twilight series
- Emma Swan, from the U.S. television series Once Upon a Time
- Elizabeth Swann, from ‘’Pirates of the Caribbean’’

== See also ==
- Johannes Ambundii de Swan (1384–1424), a German ecclesiastic
- Swan (disambiguation)
- Swann (disambiguation)
