= Swann (surname) =

Swann is a surname, and may refer to:

== A ==
- Abigail Swann, American atmospheric scientist and ecologist
- Ada Bessie Swann (1887–1963), American home economist
- AJ Swann (born 2004), American football quarterback
- Alec Swann (born 1976), English cricketer, brother of Graeme
- Alfred Swann (1843–1926), American real estate developer in Tampa, Florida
- Alfred Swann (priest) (1893–1961), Dean and Archdeacon of Hong Kong
- Andrew Swann (footballer) (born 1878), Scottish footballer
- Anthony Swann (born 1975), Samoan-New Zealand rugby league player
- Archie Swann, Scottish footballer
- Art Swann (born 1952), American politician from Tennessee

== B ==
- Ben Swann (born 1978), American television news anchor, investigative journalist and conspiracy theorist
- Bettye Swann (born 1944), American soul singer

== C ==
- Charles Swann (cricketer) (1883–1960), English cricketer
- Sir Charles Swann, 1st Baronet (1844–1929), British businessman and politician
- Charles Swann (American football) (born 1970), American football player
- Clifford Swann, Australian paralympic lawn bowls player
- Cloudia Swann, English actress

== D ==
- Dale Swann (1948–2009), American character actor
- Damian Swann (born 1992), American football player
- Darryl Swann, American record producer and musician
- David Swann (born 1949), Canadian politician from Alberta
- David J. Swann (born 1942), American politician from Georgia
- Donald Swann (1923–1994), British composer, musician and entertainer, part of the comedy duo Flanders and Swann
- Duncan Swann (1879–1962), British barrister, journalist, author and politician

== E ==
- Edgar Swann (born 1942), Irish Anglican priest
- Edward Swann (1862–1945), American politician and judge from New York
- Edward Swann (cricketer) (1823–1900), English cricketer
- Lady Elizabeth Swann (1855–1914), British social activist
- Eric Swann (born 1970), American football player

== F ==
- Francis Swann (1913–1983), American playwright, novelist, and film and television writer
- Frederick Swann (1931–2022), American musician

== G ==
- Gary Swann (born 1962), English footballer
- George T. Swann (1808–1877), American lawyer and politician from Mississippi
- Gordon Swann (1931–2013), American geologist
- Graeme Swann (born 1979), English cricketer, brother of Alec
- Greg Swann (born 1962), Australian Football executive
- Greg Swann (blogger), American property blogger

== H ==
- Harry Kirke Swann (1871–1926), British ornithologist
- Heather B. Swann (born 1961), Australian contemporary artist
- Henry Swann (1763–1824), British Tory politician, Member of Parliament
- Herbert Swann (born 1882), British footballer
- Hugh Swann (1925–2007), British cabinet maker

== I ==
- Ingo Swann (1933–2013), American remote viewer, author and artist
- Isaiah Swann (born 1985), American basketball player

== J ==
- Jack Swann (1893–1990), English footballer
- James Swann (born 1964), American serial killer
- James Swann (weightlifter) (born 1974), New Zealand male weightlifter
- Jeffrey Swann (born 1951), American concert pianist
- John Swann (politician) (1760–1793), American planter and politician from North Carolina
- John Swann (cricketer) (1926–2011), English cricketer and footballer
- John Swann (pirate), 17th-century pirate active near Madagascar
- Joshua Swann, member of the North Carolina General Assembly of 1779
- Julian Swann, British historian and academic
- Julie Swann, American systems engineer
- June Swann (born 1929), British footwear historian

== K ==
- Kate Swann (born 1964), English retailer

== L ==
- Lamin Swann (1977–2023), American politician and businessman from Kansas
- LaTonya Swann (born 1991), American dancer and choreographer
- Leonie Swann (born 1975), German crime writer
- Logan Swann (born 1975), New Zealand rugby league footballer
- Luke Swann (1983–2022), English cricket coach
- Lynn Swann (born 1952), American professional football player, sportscaster and politician from Pennsylvania

== M ==
- Matthew Swann (field hockey) (born 1989), Australian field hockey player
- Matthew Swann (musician), Canadian singer-songwriter
- Matilde Alba Swann (1912–2000), Argentine writer and lawyer
- Maxine Swann (born 1969), American fiction author
- Megan Swann, British magician
- Michael Swann (1920–1990), British biologist, chairman of the British Broadcasting Corporation (1973–1980)

== N ==
- Nancy Lee Swann (1881–1966), American sinologist and curator

== O ==
- Ofa Swann, Fijian lawyer, academic and politician
- Oliver Swann (1878–1948), British naval aviation pioneer and Royal Air Force officer

== P ==
- Pedro Swann (born 1970), American baseball player and coach
- Peter Swann (born 1965), British businessman
- Phillip Swann (born 1960), American singer and songwriter
- Polly Swann (born 1988), British rower

== R ==
- Ray Swann (born 1950), English cricketer, father of Alec and Graeme
- Rich Swann (born 1991), American professional wrestler
- Richard Swann-Mason (1871–1942), English cleric and cricketer
- Rick Swann (born 1989), Northern Irish trumpet player
- Robert L. Swann (comptroller of Maryland) (born 1935), comptroller of the State of Maryland in the United States
- Robert L. Swann (military lawyer), American lawyer, and colonel in the United States Armed Services
- Robert Swann (land trust pioneer) (1918–2003), American peace activist, founder of the E. F. Schumacher Society
- Robert Swann (actor) (1945–2006), British actor
- Robin Swann (born 1971), Northern Irish politician
- Ron Robertson-Swann (born 1941), Australian sculptor

== S ==
- S. Andrew Swann, American science fiction and fantasy author
- Samuel Swann (1653–1707), planter, militia officer and politician in colonial Virginia and North Carolina
- Sidney Swann (1890–1976), English clergyman and rower

== T ==
- Theodore Swann (1886–1955), American industrialist
- Thomas Swann (1809–1883), American politician from Maryland
- Thomas Swann Jr. (c. 1650–1704), planter, militia officer and politician in colonial Virginia
- Thomas Swann (attorney) (1765–1840), American lawyer, businessman and politician from Virginia
- Thomas Swann (councillor) (1616–1680), planter, militia officer and politician in colonial Virginia
- Thomas Swann (rower) (born 1987), Australian rower
- Thomas Burnett Swann (1928–1976), American poet, critic and fantasy author
- Thomas Swann (fl. 1806), American lawyer caned by Andrew Jackson

== V ==
- Valetta Swann (1904–1973), English painter and sculptor

== W ==
- William Swann (born 1952), American professor of sociology and personality psychology
- Wilson Cary Swann (1806–1876), American physician, philanthropist and social reformer
- William Dorsey Swann (1860–1925), American LGBT activist
- William Francis Gray Swann (1884–1962), Anglo-American physicist
- Willie Swann (born 1977), Samoan-New Zealand rugby league footballer

== See also ==
- Swan (surname)
