= List of bridges documented by the Historic American Engineering Record in Alabama =

This is a list of bridges documented by the Historic American Engineering Record in the U.S. state of Alabama.

== Bridges ==
| Survey No. | Name (as assigned by HAER) | Status | Type | Built | Documented | Carries | Crosses | Location | County | Coordinates |
|---|---|---|---|---|---|---|---|---|---|---|
| AL-7 | Bridges of the Upper Tombigbee River Valley | Demolished | | | 1978 | | Tombigbee River | Cochrane | Pickens | |
| AL-8 | Bridgeport Swing Span Bridge | Extant | Swing span | 1892 | 1983 | Louisville and Nashville Railroad | Tennessee River | Bridgeport | Jackson | 34°57′22″N 85°41′39″W |
| AL-12 | Gulf, Mobile & Ohio Railroad Bridge | Extant | Trestle | 1899 | 1992 | Gulf, Mobile and Ohio Railroad | Black Warrior River | Tuscaloosa | Tuscaloosa | 33°12′49″N 87°34′36″W |
| AL-54 | Birmingham Southern Railroad Bridge | | Steel built-up girder | | 1993 | Birmingham Southern Railroad | US 78 | Birmingham | Jefferson | |
| AL-59 | Brookside Bridge | Abandoned | Pratt truss | | 1993 | Main Street | Five Mile Creek | Brookside | Jefferson | 33°38′22″N 86°54′59″W |
| GA-61 | Fourteenth Street Bridge | Extant | Reinforced concrete closed-spandrel arch | 1922 | 1982 | 14th Street | Chattahoochee River | Phenix City, Alabama, and Columbus, Georgia | Russell County, Alabama, and Muscogee County, Georgia | 32°28′21″N 84°59′48″W |
| AL-62 | Linn Crossing Trestle Bridge | Extant | Trestle | | 1993 | Louisville and Nashville Railroad | CR 71 | Linn Crossing | Jefferson | 33°40′39″N 86°57′59″W |
| AL-63 | Louisville & Nashville Railway, Cahaba River Bridge | Extant | Parker truss | | 1992 | Louisville and Nashville Railroad | Cahaba River | Helena | Shelby | 33°18′29″N 86°51′37″W |
| AL-68 | Twentieth Street Underpass | Extant | Reinforced concrete cast-in-place slab | 1931 | 1993 | Railroad Reservation | 20th Street | Birmingham | Jefferson | 33°30′47″N 86°48′17″W |
| AL-87 | Warrior Southern Railway Bridge | Extant | Warren truss | 1905 | 1992 | Warrior Southern Railway | Hurricane Creek | Holt | Tuscaloosa | 33°15′03″N 87°27′46″W |
| AL-104 | Tensaw River Lift Bridge | Replaced | Vertical-lift bridge | 1926 | 1994 | US 90 | Tensaw River | Mobile | Mobile | 30°41′02″N 88°00′32″W |
| AL-134 | Southern Railroad Stone Arch Bridge | | Stone arch | | 1995 | Southern Railway | | Huntsville | Madison | |
| AL-139 | Keller Memorial Bridge | Replaced | Reinforced concrete open-spandrel arch | 1928 | 1990 | US 31 | Tennessee River | Decatur | Morgan and Limestone | 34°36′48″N 86°58′21″W |
| AL-201 | Swann Bridge | Extant | Lattice truss | 1933 | 2002 | Swann Bridge Road | Locust Fork of the Black Warrior River | Cleveland | Blount | 33°59′51″N 86°36′05″W |
| AL-202 | Birmingham Mineral Railroad Viaduct | Demolished | Trestle | 1903 | 2001 | Louisville and Nashville Railroad Cane Creek Branch | Newfound Creek | Birmingham | Jefferson | 33°39′32″N 86°53′55″W |
| AL-203 | Horton Mill Bridge | Extant | Lattice truss | 1935 | 2002 | Covered Bridge Circle | Calvert Prong of the Little Warrior River | Oneonta | Blount | 34°00′28″N 86°26′55″W |
| AL-204 | Tennessee River Railroad Bridge | Extant | Vertical-lift bridge | 1870 | 1989 | SR 43 (former) | Tennessee River | Florence and Sheffield | Lauderdale and Colbert | 34°46′58″N 87°40′08″W |
| AL-205 | William B. Crumpton Bridge | Replaced | Warren truss | | 1989 | SR 10 | Tombigbee River | Nanafalia | Marengo | 32°07′44″N 88°02′29″W |
| AL-206 | King Bridge | Replaced | Warren truss | | 1989 | US 43 | Black Warrior River | Demopolis | Marengo | 32°32′43″N 87°50′08″W |
| AL-207 | Tutwiler Bridge | Replaced | Warren truss | | 1989 | SR 9 | Tombigbee River | Gainesville | Sumter | 32°49′30″N 88°09′24″W |
| AL-209 | Edmund Pettus Bridge | Extant | Steel arch | 1940 | 2012 | US 80 Bus. | Alabama River | Selma | Dallas | 32°24′20″N 87°01′07″W |
| AL-214 | Ross Creek Culvert | Extant | Culvert | 1864 | 2017 | South and North Alabama Railroad | Ross Creek | Hoover | Jefferson | 33°23′10″N 86°52′05″W |
| AL-214-A | Louisville & Nashville Railroad, Ross Creek Concrete Culvert | Extant | Culvert | 1908 | 2017 | Louisville and Nashville Railroad | Ross Creek | Hoover | Jefferson | 33°23′11″N 86°52′10″W |
| AL-214-B | Ross Creek Stone Slab Culvert | Extant | Culvert | 1864 | 2017 | Ross Bridge Parkway | Ross Creek | Hoover | Jefferson | 33°22′58″N 86°52′02″W |
