= Swann =

Swann may refer to:

== People ==
- Swann (surname)

== Characters ==
- Charles Swann, a central character in Marcel Proust's novel sequence In Search of Lost Time (the first volume is Swann's Way)
- Elizabeth Swann, in the Pirates of the Caribbean films
- Luther Swann, Jess Swann and Dez Swann, characters in V Wars
- Mike Swann, a character in the British television soap opera EastEnders
- Weatherby Swann, governor of the town of Port Royal in the Pirates of the Caribbean films
- Rory Swann, the Hyperion's mechanic in StarCraft II: Wings of Liberty

== Other uses ==
- Swann, West Virginia
- 4082 Swann, an asteroid
- Swann (crater), on the far side of the Moon
- Swann: A Mystery, a novel by Carol Shields
- Swann Covered Bridge, a covered bridge in Alabama, United States
- Swann Galleries, a New York auction house
- Un amour de Swann (film) (aka Swann in Love), 1984
- Swann (film), a 1996 Canadian drama film

== See also ==
- Schwann (disambiguation)
- Swan (disambiguation)
- Swan (surname)
