= Charles Swann =

Charles Swann may refer to:

- Charles Swann (cricketer) (1883–1960), English cricketer
- Sir Charles Swann, 1st Baronet (1844–1929), British businessman and politician
- Charles Swann (American football) (born 1970), American football player
- Charles Swann, the character in Marcel Proust's In Search of Lost Time

== See also ==
- Charles Swan (disambiguation)
