= William Swan =

William or Bill Swan may refer to:

- Sir William Swan, 1st Baronet (1631–1680), of the Swan baronets
- Sir William Swan, 2nd Baronet (1667–1712), of the Swan baronets
- William Swan (silversmith) (1715–1774), American silversmith
- William Swan (missionary) (1791–1866), translator of the Bible into Mongolian
- William Swan (physicist) (1818–1894), Scottish physicist
- William Graham Swan (1821–1869), American politician
- William Turnbull Swan (1828–1875), New Zealand politician
- William Swan (British Army officer) (1914–1990), British Army officer and agriculturalist
- William Swan (aviation pioneer) (1902–1933), rocketplane entrepreneur
- William Swan (actor) (1928-2019), American actor
- Bill Swan (writer) (born 1939), Canadian children's author
- Billy Swan (born 1942), American singer-songwriter
- Bill Swan (footballer) (born 1956), Australian rules footballer
- Bill Swan (sculptor) (1917–1984), American designer and builder of roadside sculptures
- Will Swan (musician) (born 1985), American guitarist with post-hardcore band Dance Gavin Dance
- Will Swan (footballer) (born 2000), English footballer
- Bill Swan, American indie rock musician with Beulah

== See also ==
- William Swan Plumer (1802–1880), American clergyman, theologian and author
- William Swan Garvin (1806–1883), American newspaper proprietor
- William Swan Sonnenschein (1855–1931), British publisher, editor and bibliographer
- William Swann (disambiguation)
