= Swanny =

Swanny may refer to:

== Alternate spelling ==
Appearing as an alternate spelling or mis-spelling of:

- Suwannee River, in the U.S. states of Georgia and Florida
- "Swanee", an American song written in 1919 by George Gershwin
- Swannee whistle, an alternate name for a slide whistle

== Nickname ==
Used as a nickname for:

- Swanndri, a trade name for a range of outdoor clothing, very popular in New Zealand

=== People ===
- Graeme Swann (born 1979), English cricketer
- Lynn Swann (born 1952), American Swanee sports commentator and gridiron football player
- Clarence Swanson (1898–1970), American gridiron football player

== See also ==
- Swan (disambiguation)
- Swann (disambiguation)
