= John Swan =

John Swan may refer to:

- John Swan (engineer) (1787–1869), British marine engineer, pioneer of the screw propeller and inventor of the self-acting chain messenger
- John Swan (Bermudian politician) (1935–2026), Bermudian politician
- John Swan (British politician) (1877–1956), British Labour Party politician
- John Macallan Swan (1846–1910), English painter and sculptor
- John Swan (architect) (1874–1936), New Zealand architect
- John Swan (cricketer) (1848–1924), English cricketer
- John Swan (priest), Anglican Anglican; Archdeacon of Lilley and of Brisbane
- John Swan (born 1952), Scottish-Australian singer, also known as Swanee
- John Swan (Neighbours), fictional character in Australian soap opera Neighbours

== See also ==
- John Swann (disambiguation)
- John F. De Swan (1876–1956), United States Army private and Medal of Honor recipient
