= John Swann =

John Swann may refer to:

- John Swann (politician) (1760–1793), American planter and Continental Congressman for North Carolina
- John Swann (cricketer) (1926–2011), English cricketer and footballer
- John Swann (tennis), Canadian tennis player in 1960 U.S. National Championships – Men's Singles
- Jack Swann (1893–1990), English footballer
- John Swann (pirate), 17th-century pirate active near Madagascar

== See also ==
- John Swan (disambiguation)
