= Horton Mill Covered Bridge =

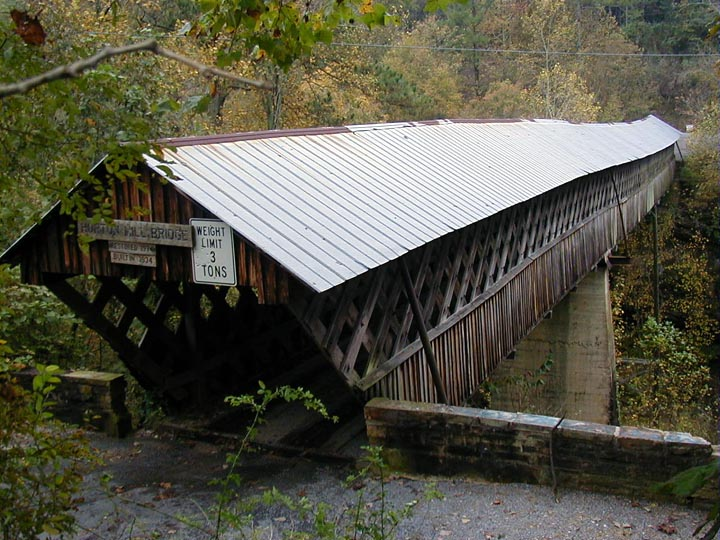
- The Horton Mill Covered Bridge near Oneonta, Alabama, before its recent restoration
- Coordinates: 34°00′27.52″N 86°26′55.05″W
- Carries: pedestrian traffic (vehicles until 2022)
- Crosses: Calvert Prong
- Locale: Oneonta, Alabama
- Maintained by: Alabama Historical Commission
- ID number: 01-05-07 (WGCB)

Characteristics
- Design: Town Lattice truss
- Total length: 220 feet (67 m)
- Width: 10 feet (3.0 m) clearance
- Load limit: 3 short tons (2.7 t)
- Clearance above: 8 feet (2.4 m)

History
- Construction end: 1934

Statistics
- Horton Mill Covered Bridge
- U.S. National Register of Historic Places
- Area: 1 acre (0.4 ha)
- MPS: Blount County Covered Bridges TR
- NRHP reference No.: 70000099
- Added to NRHP: December 29, 1970

Location
- Interactive map of Horton Mill Covered Bridge

The Horton Mill Covered Bridge is a state-owned wooden covered bridge that spans the Calvert Prong of the Little Warrior River in Blount County, Alabama, United States. It is located on a river crossing (Horton Mill Road) to Ebell Road and Covered Bridge Circle, off State Route 75 about 5 miles (8.0 km) north of the city of Oneonta.

Built in 1934, the 220-foot-long (67 m) bridge is a Town Lattice truss with two spans. Its WGCB number is 01-05-07. The Horton Mill Covered Bridge was listed on the National Register of Historic Places on December 29, 1970, the first covered bridge in the southeastern United States to be added. At 70 feet (21 m), it is the highest covered bridge above any U.S. waterway. It was reopened on March 11, 2013, after being closed in 2007 due to vandalism. The bridge will no longer open to motor vehicle traffic after April 1, 2022. The Horton Mill Covered Bridge is maintained by the Alabama Historical Commission, Blount County Commission, and the Alabama Department of Transportation.

== History ==
The original Horton Mill Covered Bridge was built in 1894 at the foot of Sand Mountain, about 3/4 mile (1.2 km) downstream from the current bridge. It was named for a local business owned by Thurman M. Horton, who helped construct the first bridge. This bridge allowed residents of Sand Mountain a better means of access to nearby Oneonta as well as to Horton's mill and a general store which were located along the east side of the Calvert Prong.

Construction of the current Horton Mill Covered Bridge began in 1934 over a deep gorge cut by the river, led by Talmedge Horton, a family descendant of Thurman Horton. It took a 15-man crew 1-1/2 years to complete the project. This crew included foreman Zelma C. Tidwell, who helped in building three other prominent covered bridges in Blount County (Easley, Nectar, Swann). The bridge was fully restored in 1974 by the Alabama Historical Commission and the Blount County Commission. It is one of three historic covered bridges remaining in Blount County.

The Horton Mill Covered Bridge was reported closed to motor vehicle traffic on September 27, 2007, due to unsafe conditions. According to a member on the photo website Flickr as well as a report from the Blount Countian, vandals attempted to remove some of the roof supports on the west side of the bridge by tying a cable or chain around them and attached the other end to either a tow hitch or hook ... using a vehicle to try to pull them out, causing significant damage. A photo showing the damaged end of the Horton Mill Covered Bridge can be seen by clicking the reference link to Flickr below. The other two historic covered bridges remaining in Blount County, Easley and Swann, were closed to motor vehicle traffic in 2009 for unsafe conditions after routine inspections.

Restoration of all three covered bridges began in late 2011 starting with the Swann Covered Bridge near Cleveland, Alabama. Money for these projects primarily came from the federal National Historic Covered Bridge Preservation Program as well as transportation enhancement funds. The $469,110 construction contract was awarded to Bob Smith Construction of Trussville, Alabama. The Horton Mill Covered Bridge would be the last to be restored due to its high elevation above the river which made things more challenging. Wooden structural pieces were repaired or replaced as needed and new tin roofs were put on all three bridges in order to keep the weather off vital supporting timbers. Total restoration costs for the covered bridges was approximately $540,000. The difference was covered by county expenditures.

Following necessary repairs and upgrades, the Horton Mill Covered Bridge was reopened to motor vehicle traffic on March 11, 2013.

In late 2015, cameras were installed at the three remaining covered bridges in Blount County to help deter vandalism after graffiti was found on the Easley Covered Bridge a year earlier. It has since been cleaned and re-painted.

In January 2022, the Blount County Commission voted in their monthly meeting to have the Horton Mill Covered Bridge closed to motor vehicle traffic beginning on April 1, 2022, due to ongoing safety concerns and recent costly repairs. The bridge will only be crossed by pedestrians after this date. This vote stemmed from another motor vehicle accident that occurred in November 2021, damaging the nearby Swann Covered Bridge. It has since been repaired.

== Dimensions ==
Main Span Length: 80.1 feet (24.4 m)

Total Span Length: 208 feet (63 m)

Deck Width: 11.2 feet (3.4 m)

Vertical Clearance: 8.5 feet (2.6 m)

Underclearance: 70 feet (21 m)

Above measurements are approximate and unofficial. Total span length is not always the same as total bridge length.

== Organizational representations ==
The Horton Mill Covered Bridge is featured on the seal of the Blount-Oneonta Chamber of Commerce.

== See also ==
- List of Alabama covered bridges
