= Sydney Castle Roberts =

British author, publisher and university administrator

Sir Sydney Castle Roberts (3 April 1887 – 21 July 1966) was a British author, publisher and university administrator. He was a well-known and popular figure around Cambridge throughout his life, and was recognised as a publisher of skill and distinction.

== Early years ==
Roberts was born in Birkenhead, the son of Frank Roberts, a civil engineer. He attended Brighton College and Pembroke College, Cambridge. During World War I, he served as a lieutenant in the Suffolk Regiment and was wounded in the Third Battle of Ypres.

== Career ==
He was Secretary of Cambridge University Press from 1922 to 1948, Master of Pembroke College, Cambridge from 1948 to 1958, Vice-Chancellor of University of Cambridge from 1949 to 1951, and Chairman of the British Film Institute from 1952 to 1956. He was an author, publisher and biographer and a noted Sherlockian, being president of the Sherlock Holmes Society of London. According to Jon Lellenberg, Roberts is responsible for the popularisation of the Sherlockian game of criticism.

In 1954 he held the Sandars Readership in Bibliography and his topic was "The evolution of Cambridge publishing.

He was knighted in 1958.

The National Portrait Gallery holds three photographic portraits of Roberts by Elliott & Fry, made in 1949.

== Personal life ==
He married, firstly, Irene Wallis (died 1932), daughter of Arnold Joseph Wallis, Fellow of Corpus Christi College, Cambridge. They had two daughters and a son. After her death, in 1938, he married a second time to Marjorie Dykes, widow of Dr Meredith Blake Robson Swann. Roberts was stepfather to Hugh Swann, cabinet maker to Queen Elizabeth II, and of Michael Swann, former chairman of the BBC.

He died in Addenbrooke's Hospital in Cambridge.

== Publications ==
1. A Picture Book of British History; Cambridge University Press, 1914
2. The Story of Doctor Johnson: being an introduction to Boswell's Life; Cambridge University Press, 1919
3. A History of the Cambridge University Press 1521–1921; Cambridge University Press, 1921
4. Doctor Johnson In Cambridge: Essays In Boswellian Imitation; Putnam, 1922
5. Lord Macaulay: The Pre-eminent Victorian; Oxford University Press, 1927
6. The charm of Cambridge; A & C Black, 1927
7. An Eighteenth-century Gentleman and other essays; Cambridge University Press, 1930
8. Doctor Watson: Prolegomena to the study of a biographical problem; Faber & Faber, 1931
9. Introduction to Cambridge; Cambridge University Press, 1934
10. Pembroke College, Cambridge: a short history; Cambridge University Press, 1936
11. Zuleika in Cambridge; Heffer & Sons, 1941
12. Springs Of Hellas And Other Essays, with Memoir by S.C. Roberts, Cambridge University Press, 1945
13. British Universities (Britain in Pictures); Collins, 1947
14. The Sir Walter Scott Lectures for 1948; Oliver and Boyd, 1948
15. Sherlock Holmes: Selected Stories: with an introduction by S C Roberts, Oxford University Press, 1951
16. Holmes & Watson: A Miscellany (Otto Penzler's Sherlock Holmes Library); Oxford University Press, 1953
17. Samuel Johnson; Longmans, 1954
18. The Evolution of Cambridge Publishing; Cambridge University Press, 1956
19. Doctor Johnson, and others; Cambridge University Press, 1958
20. Edwardian Retrospect; UK English Association, 1963
21. Adventures with Authors; Cambridge University Press, 1966
22. The Further Adventures of Sherlock Holmes: The Adventure of the Megatherium Thefts, Penguin Books 1985

Academic offices
| Preceded by Montagu Sherard Dawes Butler | Master of Pembroke College, Cambridge; 1948–1958 | Succeeded by W. V. D. Hodge |
| Preceded by Charles E. Raven | Vice-Chancellor of the University of Cambridge; 1949–1951 | Succeeded by Lionel Ernest Howard Whitby |
