= Easley Covered Bridge =

Easley CB
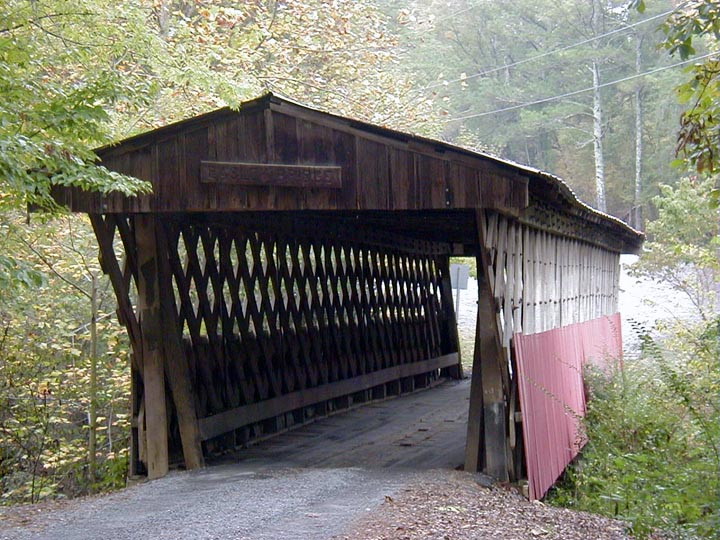
- The Easley Covered Bridge near Rosa, Alabama before its recent restoration.
- Coordinates: 33°58′16″N 86°31′07″W
- Carries: single lane motor traffic
- Crosses: Dub Branch, Calvert Prong of the Little Warrior River
- Locale: Rosa, Alabama
- Maintained by: Blount County Commission
- ID number: 01-05-12 (WGCB)

Characteristics
- Design: Town Lattice truss
- Total length: 95 ft (29 m)
- Width: 9 ft (2.7 m) clearance
- Load limit: 3 US tons (2.72 metric tons)
- Clearance above: 8 ft (2.4 m)

History
- Construction end: 1927
- Easley Covered Bridge
- U.S. National Register of Historic Places
- Alabama Register of Landmarks and Heritage
- Location within Alabama Location within the United States
- Nearest city: Rosa, Alabama
- Coordinates: 33°58′16″N 86°31′07″W
- Area: 0.5 acres (0.2 ha)
- Built: 1927
- Architect: Forrest Tidwell
- Architectural style: One Span Town Truss
- MPS: Blount County Covered Bridges TR
- NRHP reference No.: 81000125

Significant dates
- Added to NRHP: August 20, 1981
- Designated ARLH: March 3, 1976

Location
- Interactive map of Easley CB

The Easley Covered Bridge, also known as the Old Easley Covered Bridge or Rosa Covered Bridge, is a county-owned wood and metal combination style covered bridge that spans Dub Branch of the Calvert Prong of the Little Warrior River in Blount County, Alabama, United States. It is located on Easley Bridge Road off U.S. Route 231, just south of the town of Rosa, about 5 miles (8.0 kilometers) northwest of Oneonta. Coordinates are 33°58′16″N 86°31′07″W (33.971144, -86.518719).

Built in 1927, the 95-foot (29-meter) bridge is a town lattice truss construction over a single span. Its WGCB number is 01-05-12. The Easley Covered Bridge was listed on the Alabama Register of Landmarks and Heritage on March 3, 1976. It was listed on the National Register of Historic Places on August 20, 1981. It is currently the oldest and shortest of three historic covered bridges still existing in Blount County. The bridge which had been closed in 2009 has now been restored and reopened to motor vehicle traffic on October 22, 2012. It is accessible from both sides of Easley Bridge Road. It is maintained by the Blount County Commission and the Alabama Department of Transportation.

== History ==
The Easley Covered Bridge was built by a crew led by foreman Forrest Tidwell and his nephew Zelma C. Tidwell in 1927 over Dub Branch. Other than occasional repair work, the bridge had been in continuous use since it was constructed.

After a routine inspection, the Easley Covered Bridge was closed in 2009 due to unsafe conditions along with nearby Swann Covered Bridge. The Horton Mill Covered Bridge was already closed as a result of vandalism which occurred in 2007. Restoration of all three bridges began in late 2011. Money for these projects primarily came from the federal National Historic Covered Bridge Preservation Program as well as transportation enhancement funds. The $469,110 construction contract was awarded to Bob Smith Construction of Trussville, Alabama. The Easley Covered Bridge would be the second of the three to be restored. Wooden structural pieces were repaired or replaced as needed and new tin roofs were put on all three bridges in order to keep the weather off vital supporting timbers. Total restoration costs for the covered bridges was approximately $540,000. The difference was covered by county expenditures.

Following necessary repairs and upgrades, the Easley Covered Bridge was reopened to motor vehicle traffic on October 22, 2012.

In late 2015, cameras were installed at the three remaining covered bridges in Blount County to help deter vandalism after graffiti was found on the Easley Covered Bridge a year earlier. It has since been cleaned and re-painted.

== Dimensions ==
Main Span Length: 35.1 ft (10.7 m)

Total Span Length: 83.0 ft (25.3 m)

Deck Width: 10.8 ft (3.3 m)

Vertical Clearance: 9.0 ft (2.7 m)

Above measurements are approximate and unofficial. Total span length is not always the same as total bridge length.

== See also ==
- List of Alabama covered bridges
