= Locust Fork of the Black Warrior River =

Coordinates: 33°57′4.42″N 86°23′37.15″W

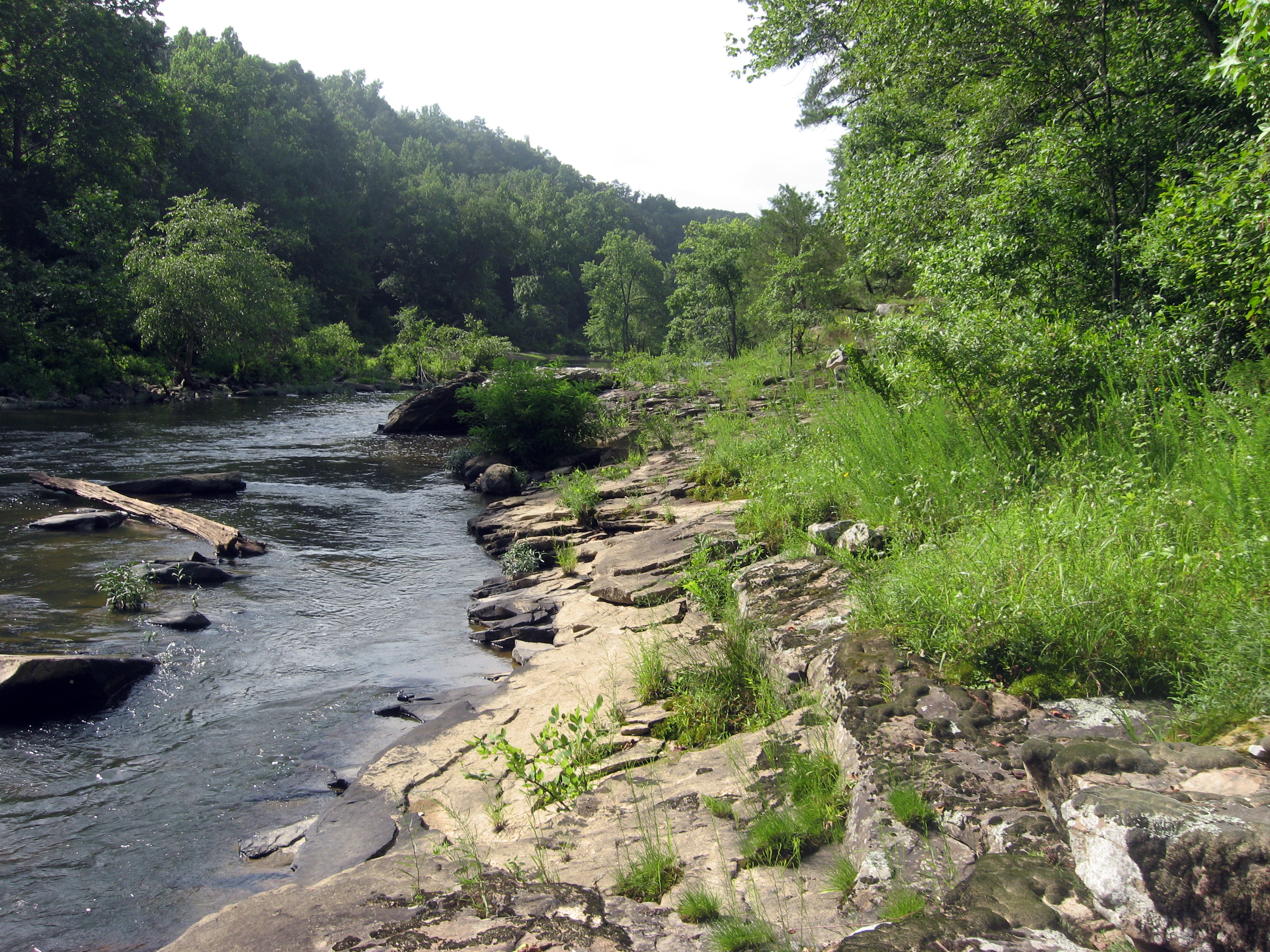
- The sandstone shelf riverscour has rare plant species

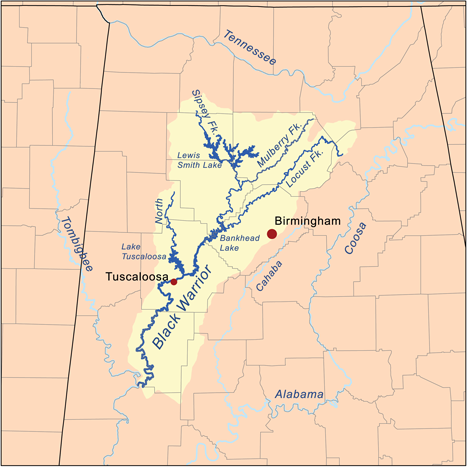

Location
- Country: United States
- State: Alabama
- County: Blount

Physical characteristics
- Length: 158 mi (254 km)
- Basin size: 1,209 sq mi (3,130 km^{2})

The Locust Fork River, in the U.S. State of Alabama, is one of three major tributaries of the Black Warrior River, stretching across Blount, and some portions of Etowah, Jefferson, and Marshall counties. Its 158-mile-long (254 km) course drains a watershed of 1,209 square miles (3,130 km^{2}) and comprises challenging whitewater rapids popular with canoers and kayakers, as well as smooth water sections for tubing, and spots for sport fishing.

The Locust Fork is home to the nationally sanctioned annual Locust Fork Canoe and Kayak Races.

In the late 1980s, the Birmingham Water Works proposed damming the river as a source of drinking water. When those plans became public, the grass-roots Friends of the Locust Fork River formed to investigate. The group held public meetings and suggested better sources of water for the metropolis. Plans for the dam were finally suspended.

== History ==
The Locust Fork is an ancient river with a surprising history. The river and its tributaries have carved a path through the surrounding ridges of sandstone and chert at least a dozen times - geological evidence that this river is older than the hills through which it flows.

That geology demonstrates that across the millennia as the Appalachians and other uplifts of the land slowly took place, the river cut through. Today it exhibits hairpin curves bordered by steep bluffs, called “entrenched meanders”. Together the river and ridges have created an array of habitats for a distinctively rich diversity of life.

In spite of threats, the Locust Fork remains free-flowing, preserving some of that rich bio-diversity, although human activity has caused many extinctions of rare and unusual species.

The river provided Native Americans ample food and shelter, resulting in abundant artifacts in the watershed.

The river's winding course caused the early white settlers to build many bridges, some of which survive from the past: Swann Covered Bridge, Horton Mill Covered Bridge, and Easley Covered Bridge.

Today in Blount County, 115 bridges longer than 20 feet currently in operation cross the Locust Fork River.

Settlers also built water-powered grain mills in almost every valley. Most of them are gone.

== Gallery ==
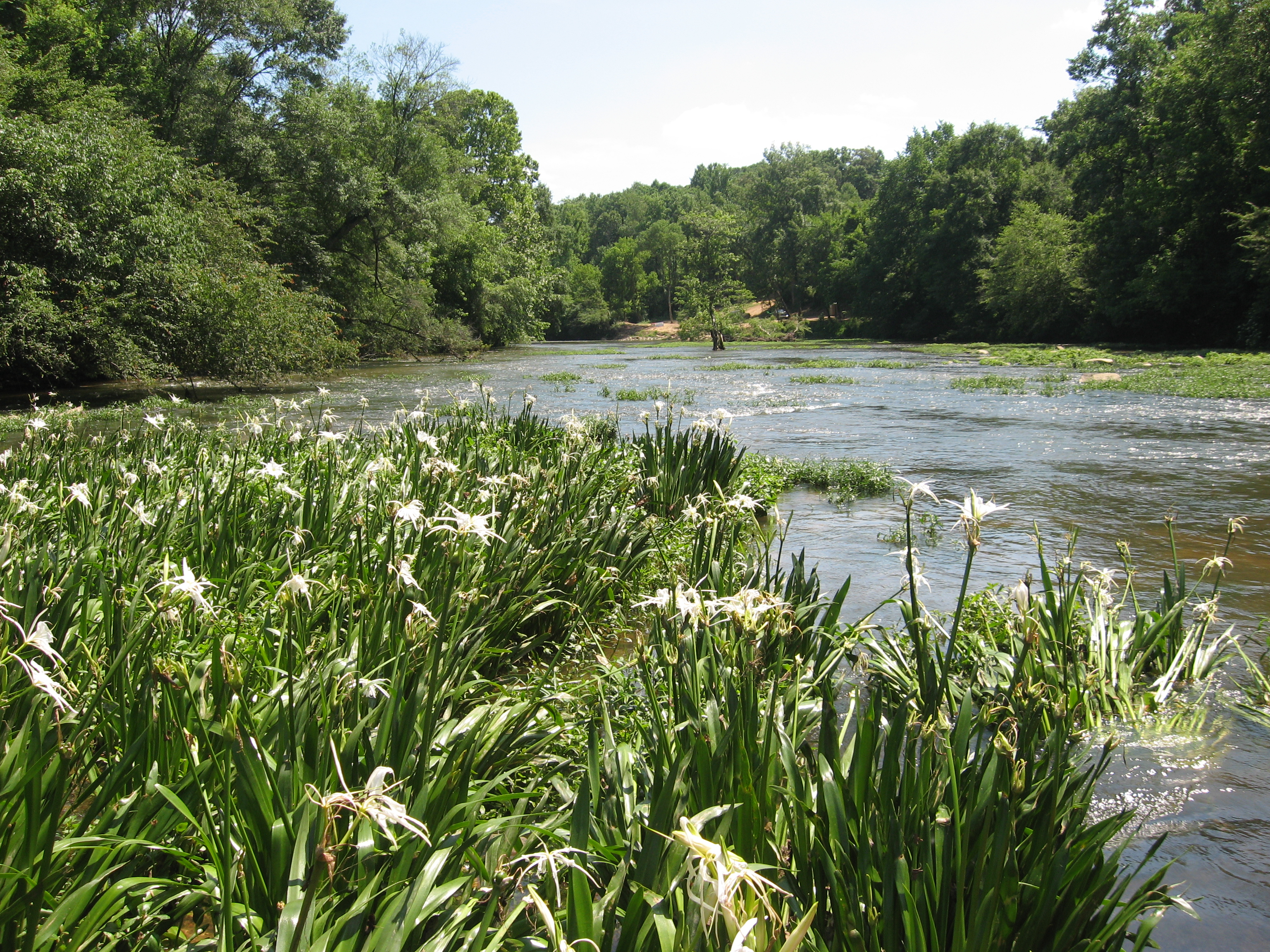
Hymenocallis coronaria is occasional on the Locust Fork.

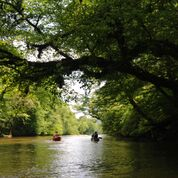
Flat water offers easy, lazy paddles.

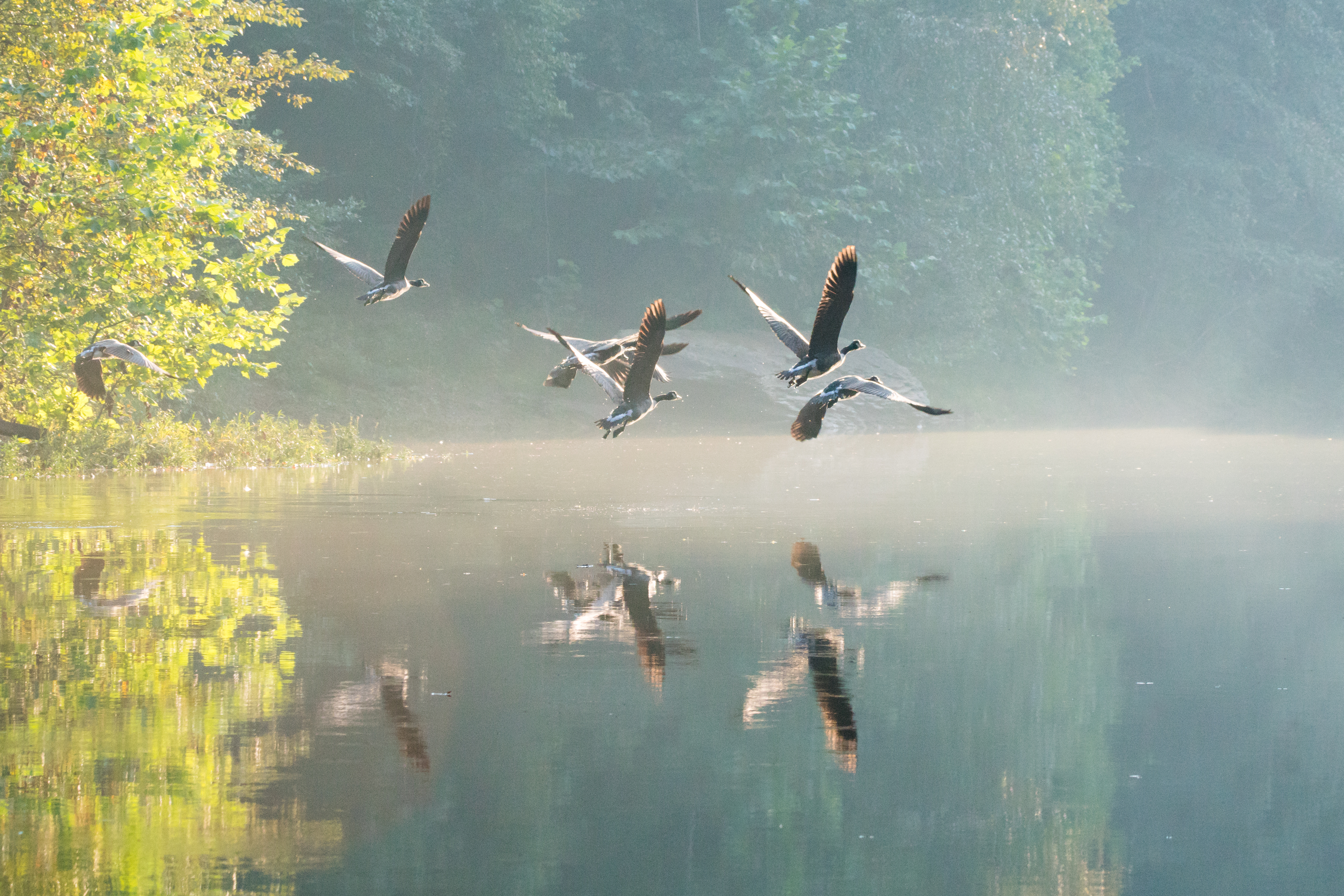
Early morning at the river

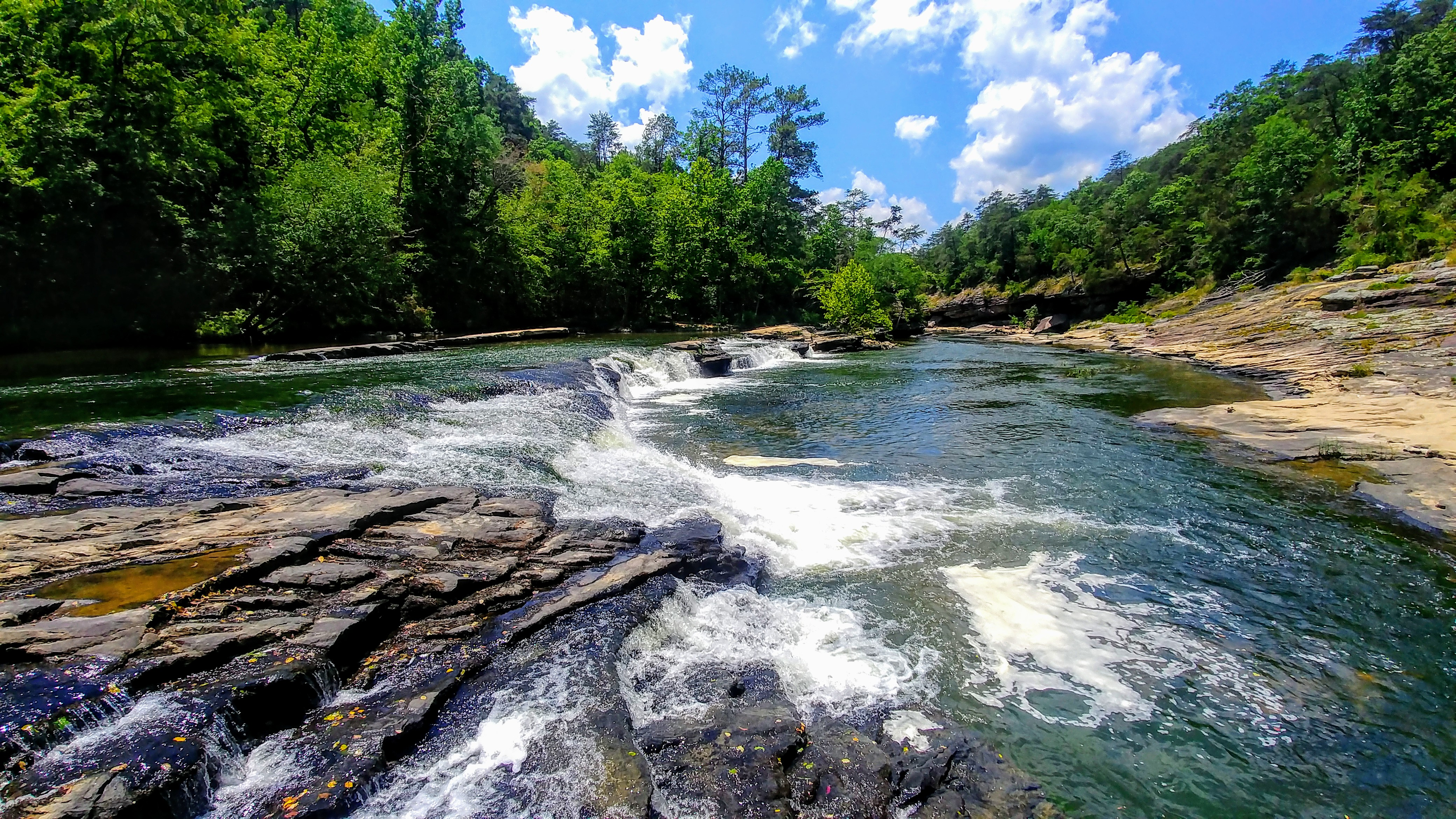
Cornelius Falls

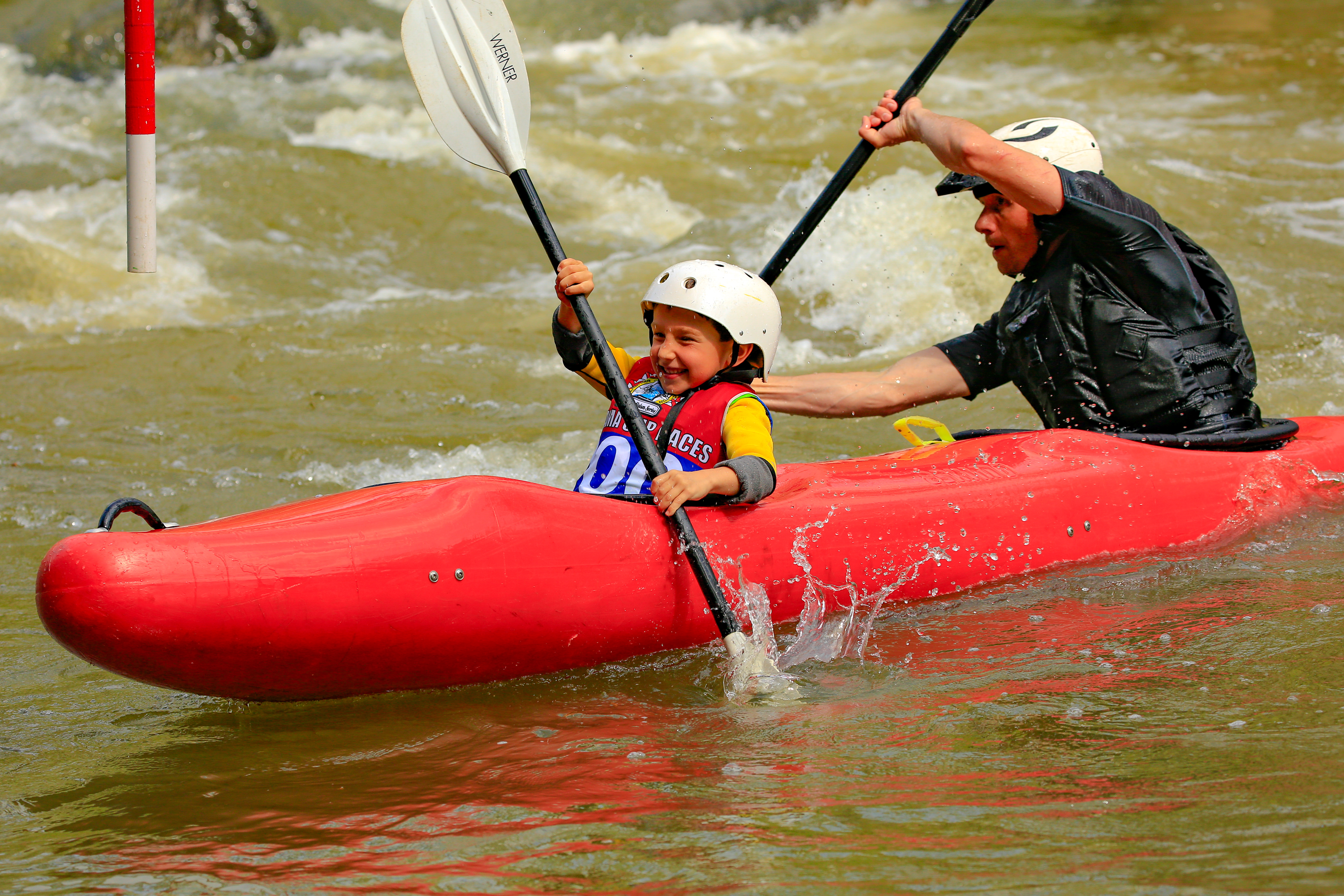
Fun in the river
