= Vivian Dykes =

British Army officer

Brigadier Vivian Dykes, CBE (9 December 1898 in Bromley, Kent – 29 January 1943), known as Dumbie Dykes, was a British civil servant and officer of the Royal Engineers, who ultimately died serving in the Second World War.

== Military career ==
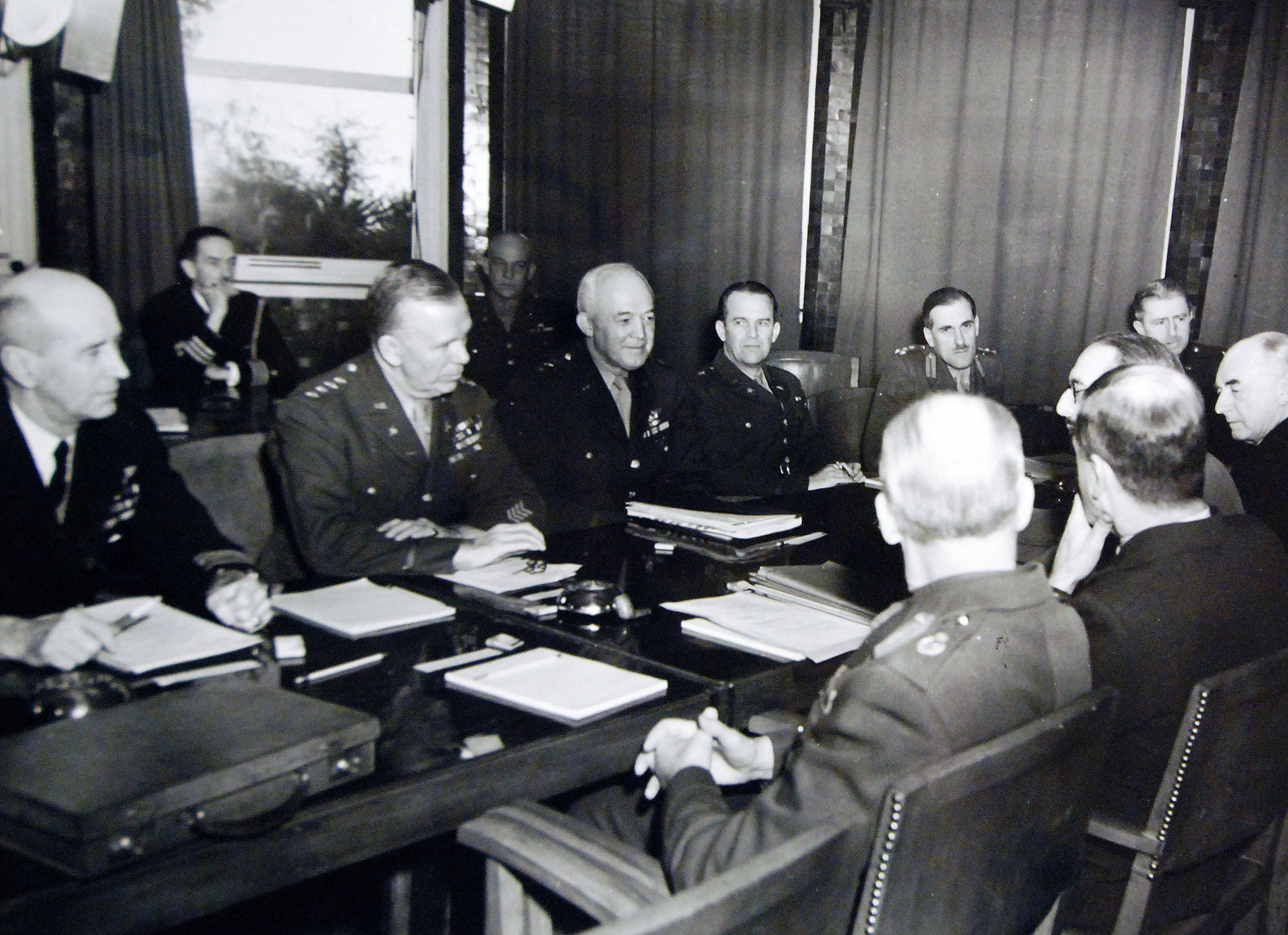
American and British military leaders at the Casablanca Conference, January 1943. Brigadier V. Dykes is sat fifth from the left.

He was director of Plans, War Office between 1939 and 1941 and became the first Chief Combined Secretary British Joint Staff Mission Washington in 1942. He was described as being "at the heart of allied military policy making."

In the winter of 1940–41, before the U.S. had formally entered the war, Dykes was selected for an unusual, but important mission: to escort Colonel William Joseph Donovan, soon to become head of the Office of Strategic Services (forerunner to the CIA) and head of U.S. intelligence, on a fact-finding tour of the Mediterranean.

Dykes died in 1943 on approach to RAF Talbenny on a flight from Casablanca. On hearing the news, Winston Churchill sent a telegram to Air Chief Marshal Sir Charles Portal asking him to send his condolences to Dykes' relatives. He was buried at St Michael's Churchyard, Yorktown, Surrey.

At the time of his death, Dykes was serving as senior British secretary to the combined Chiefs of Staffs. He posthumously received the Distinguished Service Medal and was given a memorial service at Washington Cathedral in Washington, D.C., attended by British ambassador Lord Halifax, General George Marshall, Admiral Ernest King, Admiral Sir Percy Noble and many other dignitaries. The D.C. correspondent for The Times called Dykes "one of the most popular British officers who ever came to Washington."

His war time diaries were edited by Alex Danchev and published under the title Establishing the Anglo-American Alliance: The Second World War Diaries of Brigadier Vivian Dykes in 1990.

== Family ==
Dykes married Ada Winifred (née Smyth) in 1922. Dykes was uncle to Michael Swann, former chairman of the BBC, and Hugh Swann, cabinet maker to Queen Elizabeth II of the United Kingdom.
