= Little Warrior River =

Coordinates: 33°57′5.96″N 86°23′36.84″W

Location
- Country: United States
- State: Alabama
- County: Blount

Physical characteristics
- Length: 7 mi (11 km)

Little Warrior River is a 7-mile-long (11 km) river in Blount County, Alabama. It is a tributary of the Locust Fork of the Black Warrior River. The Little Warrior River forms near the town of Locust Fork at the confluence of the Calvert Prong and the Blackburn Fork.
