= William Swann (disambiguation) =

William Swann is a professor of social and personality psychology.

William Swann may also refer to:

- William Francis Gray Swann, Anglo-American physicist
- William Dale Swann, American character actor
- William Dorsey Swann, American former slave and activist, known as the first drag queen
- Willie Swann, rugby league player
- Billy Swann, musician in The Muffins and Urban Verbs

== See also ==
- William Swan (disambiguation)
