= Washington Gardens (Boston) =

Coordinates: 42.3552°N 71.0628°W

Washington Gardens (1814 – ca.1829) was a place of public entertainment and refreshment in early 19th-century Boston, Massachusetts. Also known as Vauxhall, it specialized in fireworks, circuses, musical and theatrical performances, pictorial exhibitions, and the occasional balloonist and necromancer. John H. Schaffer oversaw the enterprise beginning in 1814.

== History ==
The name of the business referred to George Washington, in an attempt to uplift to what was basically a party space. "Whatever bears the title of [Washington] must be dear, and indeed invaluable to the American bosom."

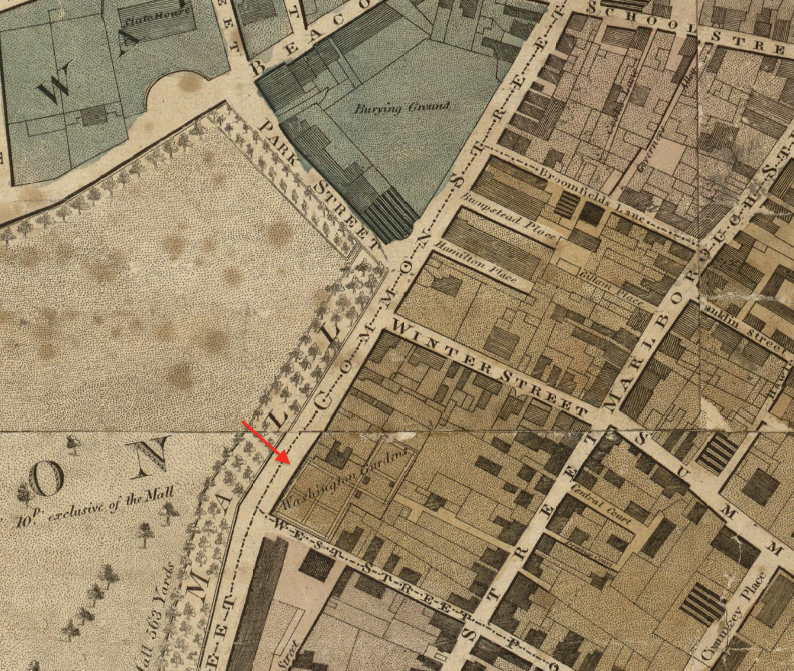
Detail of 1814 map of Boston, showing location of Washington Gardens on Common Street

Schaffer advertised frequently in local newspapers. In August 1814, for instance, "J.H. Shaffer respectfully informs his friends and the public that the illumination of the Washington Gardens ... will take place this evening, with such additions and improvements as he flatters himself cannot fail to please the public -- 900 orange transparent lamps and transparencies will be so disposed as to produce the most pleasing effect; the Italian Band of music are engaged to perform for the evening, under the direction of Mr. Massi. Refreshment of every kind with the fruits of the season may be procured at the Gardens. ... Constables will be stationed on the different gates to preserve order."

In the summer of 1815, there were "fire works to be conducted by Monsr. David, celebrated in that art at the Runelagh in England, and the Tivoly Gardens in Paris." A few weeks later appeared "the double French Mosaic, in 20 changes of natural colours, invented by the celebrated artist, Claude Ruggieri, Firework Maker to the ... Bourbons in Paris;" and a few weeks after that "the wings of the windmill of Don Quixote, in the centre of which will be seen a perpetual wheel, intermixed with innumerable colours." Every year July 4th festivities took place in the Gardens—fireworks, concerts, and so on. In 1819 as part of the day-long, citywide activities "the Boston Light Infantry, under Capt. Codman, will appear in uniform, and breakfast at Washington Gardens."

The business received good press. A European visiting Boston around 1820 noted: "Gardens are neither numerous nor noteworthy, but one to which people refer is Washington's Garden, where subscription parties and large regimental dinners are often held." Local press tended towards gushing enthusiasm. "The illuminated scenery, the variegated walks, the romantic arbours, the tasteful decoration of the garden -- the swelling music, the sweet, the gay and cheering song -- the luxuriant refreshment within the house - the order, decency, respectability ... the arrangements made to exclude improper visitants from the garden." Also praised were "the odorous perfumes, the soft thrilling music, and the dazzling brilliants" of "this beautiful retreat, this elysium in miniature."

Gottlieb Graupner directed the house orchestra in 1816. His wife Catherine Graupner, who performed elsewhere in Boston, sometimes sang for the audience at the Gardens.

Customers of the Washington Gardens had access to both indoor and outdoor spaces. Schaffer himself lived on the premises. (Before the Gardens opened, the previous tenant of the site and its building was James Swan). In March 1815 Schaffer installed a pavilion that had been part of Boston's celebration of the end of the War of 1812. He added gas lighting in 1817; and in 1819 upgraded the bars ("the different bar rooms are more commodious") and built an amphitheatre.

The new amphitheatre is a neat brick building of one story, with numerous large venetian windows, the wide spaces of which admit a current of air ... so that as much coolness is secured within as even in summer can be desirable. [Inside], the ring for equestrian performances is about 45 feet in diameter - but is covered with a temporary floor on those occasions when riding forms no part of the performance. Twenty-two boxes, supported by ten columns surround the area. ... The house though plain is painted with great spirit and effect -- especially the roof, which is divided into compartments, and has a sky light in the centre, in order to exhibit panoramas, or other paintings during the day. The proscenium is well adapted to the voice - and the stage doors on both sides are neatly decorated by tasteful ornaments. The following motto, not very classical, but appropriate enough, 'Be Merry and Wise' - forms the centre of the frontispiece. The boxes are capable of containing 30 persons each. ... The house when there is no riding is capable of containing at least 1,800 or 2,000 persons.

"In the yard back of Washington Gardens" were auctioned "a valuable flock of sheep" in 1814. There was attached a stable; in the spring of 1816 horses were available to rent or buy ("circus horses ... Venus, Holly, Monarch, Knickerbocker, Favorite and Tom Thumb.")

A fire in Beacon Hill across the Common in 1824 caused "some of the buildings in the Washington Gardens [to take] fire from the burning flakes wafted thither by the wind." However the business survived. It continued on for several years thereafter, dissolving around 1829.

== Events ==
- 1816
  - Concerts by vocalist Mrs. Burke, "to conclude with a passuel by Mr. Jones, in which he will introduce 3 different styles of dancing."
  - Sept. - "Mrs. Day Francis, from the Theatres Royal, Ashley's and Saddlers' Wells, London ... will dance a hornpipe in the character of a sailor."
  - Feb. 22 - "The anniversary birth-day of the sainted Washington was honored in this place by various demonstrations of public rejoicing. The South-End, and Washington artillery fired the usual salutes, during the day; similar salutes were also given from Fort Independence. In the evening, the Washington Gardens, and other public places of resort, were handsomely illuminated, and from the Gardens, a rich display of fire-works was exhibited."
- 1819
  - July - Comic tales by Mr. Bernard "delivered with great force and propriety."
  - July - "Entire new ballet, got up under the direction of Mr. Parker, called 'Auld Robin Gray.' Part 2 - a concert, consisting of a number of songs, by Messrs. Brenan and Jones, and Mrs. Wheatley. ... After which ... the popular melo dramatic spectacle of 'William Tell, or - the Swiss Patriot.'"
  - Circus, directed by Messrs. Pepin & Campbell. "They have a stud of 16 fine horses, and a full company of male and female riders." "Miss Wealand, on one horse, will perform many graceful feats and attitudes and conclude with the broad sword exercise. -- Slack rope by Mr. Mayhier. -- Metamorphose of the Sack, by Mr. Bogardas, to conclude with the Friccasee Dance."
- 1820
  - July 17 - George Colman's The Heir at Law and Samuel Foote's The Liar. "Between the play and afterpiece, a recitation by Mrs. Legg; and a comic song by Mr. Simonds." "The Trustees give notice that the settees in front of the circle are reserved for the accommodation of His Excellency the Governor [i.e. John Brooks] - the officers composing his staff - the selectmen of Boston, and other invited guests who will honor the performances with their presence."
  - August - Concert by "Mr. Cristiani, musician to his Catholic majesty of Spain [i.e. Ferdinand VII], compositor of music to the theatres of the courts of Spain, and member of the Philo-Harmonic Academy of Bologna."
  - August - James Ellison's The American Captive, or Siege of Tripoli.
- 1821
  - June - "Tight rope dancing by the wonders of the world, Mons. Godeau and Mademoiselle Adolphe -- Mathematical and philosophical recreations, balancing imitations, &c by Sieur Breslaw."
  - August - Exhibition of "an elegant equestrian statue, painted by Curtis." Performance of "Kotzebue's celebrated play, in 5 acts, called 'The Stranger.' The evening's entertainment will conclude with the humorous and highly popular farce of Who's the Dupe?" by Hannah Cowley.
  - September - Ascension from the Garden of aeronaut Mr. Guille in a balloon. "A platform ... has been constructed in the Washington Gardens, so that the public may enjoy in tranquility this beautiful spectacle. The ascension of the balloon will take place at 4 o'clock in the afternoon. Mr. Guille will himself ascend in his balloon, in presence of the spectators, and rise with it into the higher regions of the air." However "soon after Mr. Guille's ascent, a slight shower of rain came on, which induced him to shorten his excursion. While the balloon was still in sight of many of the spectators, it was observed to descend rapidly, and to land in the western part of Charlestown."
- 1823, June—Theatrical performance of John Tobin's The Honey Moon and Thomas Didbin's Kenilworth.
- 1824, August - Fireworks "in honor of the arrival of Lafayette."
- 1825
  - July 4 - Fireworks "got up and prepared by Mr. Eliot, a celebrated artist from the city of London."
- 1825
  - September - "3 amphibious quadrupeds, alive, of the seal tribe."
  - November - Eugene Robertson's phantasmagoria. "Mr. Robertson's dreadful collection of ghosts and spectres. ... Mr. Robertson is the best necromancer that has ever appeared in our country."
- 1826, July 4 - Jubilee in honor of the 50th anniversary of U.S. Independence. "Gardens will be most brilliantly illuminated in a new Columbian style." Also "six new and grand national transparencies executed by Messrs. John R. Penniman, Swett & Co. which represent the temple of liberty, supported by pillars of wisdom, and constitutes the six renowned statesmen, who became presidents of the United States." Also "there will be raised from the Gardens a splendid transparent air balloon illuminated with fireworks. This balloon is 25 feet in height and 15 feet in diameter." Also the Brigade Band will "perform select national airs."
- 1827 - Sophie, Harry and David Eberle.
