= James Swan =

James Swan may refer to:

== Musicians ==
- Jimmy Swan (1912–1995), American country musician
- Jimmy Barnes (born 1956), singer-songwriter whose real name is James Swan

== Politicians ==
- James Swan (mayor of Brisbane) (1811–1891)
- James C. Swan (born 1958), United Nations Secretary-General's Special Representative for Somalia
- James D. Swan (1903–1977), vegetable farmer from Wisconsin who served two terms as a state senator

== Others ==
- Jim Swan (James Sneddon Swan, 1941–2017), whisky expert
- James Swan (boxer) (born 1974), boxer from Australia
- James Swan (financier) (1754–1830), Bostonian merchant
- James G. Swan (1818–1900), Indian agent
- James A. Swan, American writer, TV and film producer, and actor

== See also ==
- James Swann (born 1964), American serial killer
- James Swann (weightlifter), New Zealand weightlifter
