= Mount Vernon Proprietors =

- Industry: Real estate
- Founded: in Boston, Massachusetts

Mount Vernon Proprietors was a real estate development syndicate operating in Boston, Massachusetts. Founded at the end of the 18th century, it developed land on the south slope of Beacon Hill into a desirable residential neighborhood.

== History ==
In 1795 a syndicate formed by Harrison Gray Otis sought to speculate on land development around the newly formed government buildings on Boston's Beacon Hill. The Mount Vernon Proprietors, as the group was named, included founders Otis, Jonathan Mason, Joseph Woodward and Charles Ward Apthorp. Membership in the Proprietors changed frequently but partners included Charles Bulfinch, Hepzibah Swan, Henry Jackson, Dr. Benjamin Joy, William Scollay.

As probably the first organized real estate syndicate in early Federal period America, the Proprietors' contribution to real estate development formulated the model by which much of America was built.

The Proprietors purchased an 18.5-acre (75,000 m^{2}) cow pasture for the total sum of $18,450 from the esteemed painter John Singleton Copley who was living in England at the time. The Copley tract comprised an area of Beacon Hill now bound by Beacon Street, Walnut Street and Mount Vernon Street and the area called Louisburg Square. After agreeing to the sale, Copley reconsidered the offer and tried unsuccessfully for ten years to break the sale contract.

Once the sale was upheld, architect Charles Bulfinch set out to pattern streets, design mansions, and create an elegant urban setting.

Houses associated with the Proprietors that survive to the present day include:

- 29A Chestnut Street. Built "on spec" by the Proprietors in 1799.
- 13, 15, 17 Chestnut Street. Built by Hepzibah Swan, 1804–1805.

The houses from 70 through 75 Beacon Street, Boston, opposite the Boston Public Garden, were built by the Mount Vernon Proprietors in 1828, on a speculative basis. They have a continuous granite facade. The architect was Asher Benjamin (1773–1845). According to a Harvard text on Beacon Hill architecture, #72's facade is unchanged and #73 retains its original brass-work on the front door. These houses are in addition to those listed above.
