= Schwan =

Schwan may refer to:

== People ==
- Christian Friedrich Schwan (1733–1815), German publisher
- Gesine Schwan (born 1943), German professor
- Haley Schwan, American ballet dancer
- Heinrich Christian Schwan (1819–1905), German-American religious figure
- Herman P. Schwan (1915–2005), German-American scientist
- Ivyann Schwan (born 1983), American actress
- Michael Schwan (born 1939), German Olympic rower
- Severin Schwan (born 1967), Swiss businessman
- Theodore Schwan (1841–1926), American military man

== Ships ==
- Schwan (ship, 1932), a former car ferry on Lake Zurich, Switzerland
- SS Schwan (1938), a German cargo ship in service 1938–39
- Schwan (ship, 1939), a former passenger ship on Lake Zurich, Switzerland
- Schwan (ship, 1969), a car ferry on Lake Zurich, Switzerland

== Other uses ==
- Schwan's Company, formerly the Schwan Food Company
- Schwan Super Rink, an ice rink facility in Blaine, Minnesota, US

== See also ==
- Swan (disambiguation)
- Schwann (disambiguation)
