= Graham Leonard =

English Roman Catholic priest (1921–2010)

The Right Reverend and Right Honourable Monsignor Graham Leonard KCVO
- Catholic priest Former Bishop of London
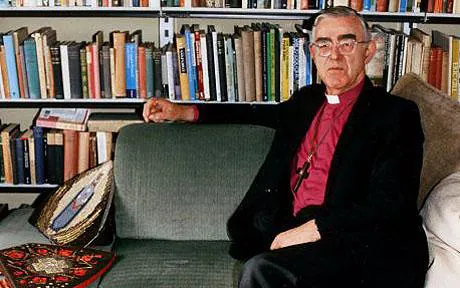
- Previous posts: Bishop of London (1981–1991); Bishop of Truro (1973–1981); Bishop of Willesden (1964–1973)

Orders
- Ordination: 1947 (Anglican deacon); 1948 (Anglican priest); 23 April 1994 (Catholic priest)

Personal details
- Born: Graham Douglas Leonard; 8 May 1921 Greenwich, London, England
- Died: 6 January 2010 (aged 88) Oxfordshire, England
- Denomination: Roman Catholic (previously Anglican)
- Parents: Douglas Leonard and Emily Leonard (née Cheshire)
- Spouse: Priscilla Swann (m. 1943)
- Children: 2
- Education: Balliol College, Oxford

Military service
- Branch/service: British Army
- Rank: Captain
- Unit: Oxfordshire and Buckinghamshire Light Infantry

Graham Douglas Leonard (8 May 1921 – 6 January 2010) was an English Roman Catholic priest and former Anglican bishop. His principal ministry was as a bishop of the Church of England but, after his retirement as the Bishop of London, he became a Roman Catholic, becoming the most senior Anglican cleric to do so since the English Reformation. He was conditionally ordained to the priesthood in the Catholic Church and was later appointed a monsignor by Pope John Paul II.

== Early life ==
Born on 8 May 1921, Leonard was the son of Douglas Leonard, an Anglican priest, and his wife Emily Leonard (née Cheshire). He was educated at Monkton Combe School near Bath and at Balliol College, Oxford, where he read botany. During the Second World War he was commissioned into the Oxfordshire and Buckinghamshire Light Infantry, rising to the rank of captain. He spent the latter part of the war attached to the Army Operational Research Group for the Ministry of Supply. He then attended Westcott House theological college in Cambridge. He was ordained as a deacon in 1947 and as a priest the following year.

Although raised in the evangelical Anglican tradition, Leonard was drawn to Anglo-Catholicism from childhood, having been impressed by the ceremonial worship he encountered at a south London mission when he was eleven. During his theological training at Westcott House, he moved away from the theological approach of its faculty, turning instead to Charles Gore, the Anglican theologian associated with the liberal Anglo-Catholic movement of the late nineteenth century. Leonard regarded Gore's earlier writings, which predated the development of modern historical-critical approaches to biblical interpretation, as his principal theological authority.

== Early ministry ==
Leonard was a curate in St Ives, Huntingdonshire, and at Stansted, Essex. He then spent three years as vicar of Ardleigh, Essex. In 1957 he became a residentiary canon of St Albans Cathedral and the diocesan director of religious education. His long association with the Diocese of London began in 1962 when, before becoming the Bishop of Willesden (a suffragan bishopric in the diocese) in 1964, he was appointed as Archdeacon of Hampstead and as rector of St Andrew Undershaft with St Mary Axe in the City of London.

== Episcopal ministry ==
Leonard had three episcopal positions in the Church of England, firstly as the suffragan Bishop of Willesden in the Diocese of London and later as the diocesan Bishop of Truro (1973 to 1981) and the Bishop of London (1981 to 1991). During this last period he was also Dean of the Chapel Royal, a Royal Household office, for which he was appointed Knight Commander of the Royal Victorian Order (KCVO). He was also Prelate of the Order of the British Empire.

As the Bishop of London, Leonard was admired for his pastoral concern for female staff at Church House and had a considerable number of female workers in parishes in his diocese. He was notable for ordaining 71 women as deacons at St Paul's Cathedral on 22 March 1987, but he remained an outspoken critic of moves to ordain women to the priesthood within the Anglican Communion.

In 1989, Leonard co-authored a book titled Let God be God with two Anglican theologians examining the issue of inclusive language in the church, giving particular attention to inclusive God language, of which they were especially critical:

this God and Lord ... is revealed to us as Father, Son and Holy Spirit. Try as we may, we cannot see how we can accept God's self-revelation without also accepting that God has chosen to use certain male symbols and male language to express to us the kind of God 'he' is. To cease to use these terms is, to us, to discard that revelation."

Leonard retired during May 1991.

== Ordination in the Roman Catholic Church ==
After his retirement Leonard left the Church of England to become a Roman Catholic. On 23 April 1994 he was conditionally ordained as a priest (but not as a bishop) in the Catholic Church. Although the Catholic Church does not recognise the validity of Anglican ordinations, Leonard's ordination was conditional due to there being "prudent doubt" about his previous ordination in the Church of England, because at Leonard's own consecration in 1964 a bishop of an Old Catholic church of the Union of Utrecht (whose own ordination as a bishop was recognised as valid by the Roman Catholic Church) was among the bishops who consecrated him. This eased his reception into the Roman Catholic Church, although his claim that he was legitimately a bishop and his request for a personal prelature were rejected.

Leonard stated that he was not first ordained a deacon in the Catholic Church and that Pope John Paul II's personal instruction was that he should be ordained immediately to the priesthood sub conditione. He was later appointed a papal chaplain with the title Monsignor and then a prelate of honour by the Pope on 3 August 2000.

== Family ==
Leonard married Priscilla Swann, a fellow botany student he had met at Oxford, in 1943, and was therefore the brother-in-law to the academic Michael Swann and Hugh Swann, cabinet maker to Elizabeth II. He and his wife had two sons.

== National Portrait Gallery ==
Nine portraits of Leonard (1962 by Elliott & Fry and 1979 by Bassano and Vandyk) are owned by the National Portrait Gallery.

Church of England titles
Preceded by George Ingle	Bishop of Willesden; 1964–1973	Succeeded by Hewlett Thompson
Preceded by John Key	Bishop of Truro; 1973–1981	Succeeded by Peter Mumford
Preceded by Gerald Ellison	Bishop of London; 1981–1991	Succeeded by David Hope
