= Edgar Swann =

Irish Anglican priest (born 1942)

Edgar John Swann (born 1942) was an Irish Anglican priest during the second half of the 20th century. As of 2007, he was Archdeacon of Glendalough.

Swann was educated at Trinity College, Oxford. He was ordained deacon in 1968 and priest in 1969. After curacies in Crumlin and Howth he became Rector at Greystones. He was Archdeacon of Glendalough from 1994 to 2008.
