= Peter Swan =

Peter Swan may refer to:

- Peter Swan (footballer, born 1936), (1936–2021) Sheffield Wednesday and England player who was involved in the 1964 British betting scandal
- Peter Swan (footballer, born 1966), (1966) former Leeds United, Hull City, Port Vale, Plymouth Argyle, Burnley, Bury and York City player
- Peter Swan, a fictional film director from the 1988 film The Dead Pool, played by Liam Neeson

== See also ==
- Peter Swann (born 1965), British businessman
