= Swann Covered Bridge =

Bridge in Blount County, Alabama, United States

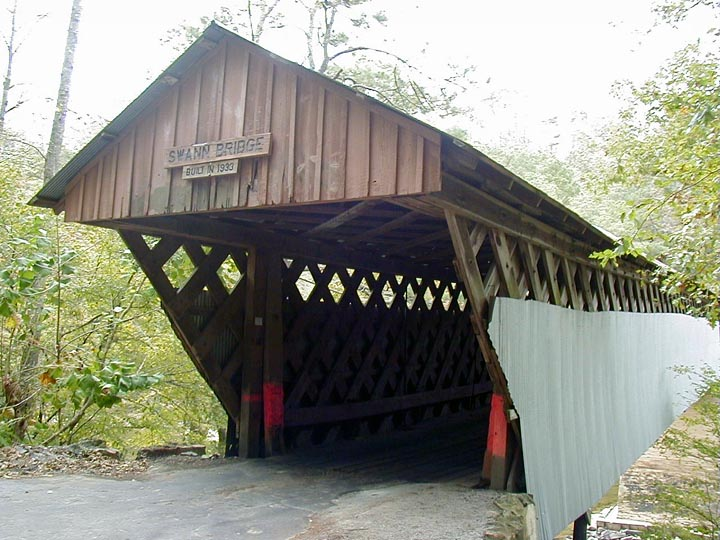
- The Swann Covered Bridge near Cleveland, Alabama, before its recent restoration
- Coordinates: 33°59′51.35″N 86°36′5.13″W
- Carries: Single lane of motor traffic
- Crosses: Locust Fork of the Black Warrior River
- Locale: Cleveland, Alabama
- Maintained by: Blount County Commission
- ID number: 01-05-05 (WGCB)

Characteristics
- Design: Town Lattice truss
- Total length: 324 feet (99 m)
- Width: 9 feet (2.7 m) clearance
- Load limit: 3 short tons (2.7 t)
- Clearance above: 8 feet (2.4 m)

History
- Construction end: 1933
- Swann Covered Bridge
- U.S. National Register of Historic Places
- Area: 1 acre (0.4 ha)
- Architectural style: Three-span Town lattice truss
- MPS: Blount County Covered Bridges TR
- NRHP reference No.: 81000123
- Added to NRHP: August 20, 1981

Location
- Interactive map of Swann Covered Bridge

The Swann Covered Bridge, also called the Joy Covered Bridge or Swann-Joy Covered Bridge, is a county-owned, wood-and-metal combination style covered bridge that spans the Locust Fork of the Black Warrior River in Blount County, Alabama, United States. It is located on Swann Bridge Road off State Route 79, just west of the town of Cleveland, about 10 miles (16 km) northwest of Oneonta.

Built in 1933, the 324-foot-long (99 m) bridge is a Town lattice truss with three spans. Its WGCB number is 01-05-05. The Swann Covered Bridge was listed on the National Register of Historic Places on August 20, 1981. It is currently the longest existing historic covered bridge in Alabama and second longest in the state overall after the 334-foot-long (102 m) Twin Creek Covered Bridge in Midway, Alabama, which was built in 2000. The Swann Covered Bridge is maintained by the Blount County Commission and the Alabama Department of Transportation.

== History ==
The Swann Covered Bridge was built by a crew led by Zelma C. Tidwell over a scenic gorge of the Locust Fork on property owned by the Swann Farm. It was originally dubbed the 'Joy Covered Bridge', as the bridge connected Cleveland with the nearby community of Joy. The bridge was restored by the Blount County Commission in 1979. After the 385-foot-long (117 m) Nectar Covered Bridge (also located in Blount County) burned down in 1993, the Swann Covered Bridge became the longest covered bridge existing in Alabama. It is one of three historic covered bridges remaining in Blount County.

After a routine inspection, the Swann Covered Bridge was closed in 2009 due to unsafe conditions along with nearby Easley Covered Bridge. The Horton Mill Covered Bridge was already closed as a result of vandalism which occurred in 2007. Restoration of all three bridges began in late 2011. Money for these projects primarily came from the federal National Historic Covered Bridge Preservation Program as well as transportation enhancement funds. The $469,110 construction contract was awarded to Bob Smith Construction of Trussville, Alabama. The Swann Covered Bridge would be the first of the three to be restored. Wooden structural pieces were repaired or replaced as needed and new tin roofs were put on all three bridges in order to keep the weather off vital supporting timbers. Total restoration costs for the covered bridges was approximately $540,000. The difference was covered by county expenditures.

Following necessary repairs and upgrades, the Swann Covered Bridge was reopened to motor vehicle traffic on October 22, 2012. Photos of restoration to the bridge can be viewed via The Birmingham News on AL.com (linked below).

In late 2015, cameras were installed at the three remaining covered bridges in Blount County to help deter vandalism after graffiti was found on the Easley Covered Bridge a year earlier. It has since been cleaned and re-painted.

=== 2018 motor vehicle accident ===
On June 9, 2018, the Swann Covered Bridge was closed until further notice after an SUV sped around a curve and crashed into its western entrance. The incident was caught on a bridge camera. There was moderate damage to the bridge and concrete support, estimated at a little under $50,000. The bridge was reopened by December 31, 2018.

=== 2021 motor vehicle accident ===
On November 15, 2021, a box truck which was apparently too high for the proper clearance damaged both ends of the Swann Covered Bridge while passing through it. The bridge was able to remain open to motor vehicle traffic until repairs could be made within the coming weeks.

During their January 2022 monthly meeting, the Blount County Commission began to look into placing clearance bars at each end of the Swann and Easley covered bridges along with putting speed bumps at the approaches, recommended by the county engineer, in order to improve motor vehicle safety. The Commission had also voted to permanently close the nearby Horton Mill Covered Bridge to motor vehicle traffic, effective April 1, 2022.

== Dimensions ==
Main Span Length: 75.1 feet (22.9 m)

Total Span Length: 330.1 feet (100.6 m)

Deck Width: 16.1 feet (4.9 m)

Vertical Clearance: 13 feet (4.0 m)

Underclearance: 27 feet (8.2 m)

Above measurements are approximate and unofficial. Total span length is not always the same as total bridge length.

== See also ==
- List of bridges documented by the Historic American Engineering Record in Alabama
- List of Alabama covered bridges
