= Glenn Swan =

Australian rules footballer

Personal information
- Full name: Glenn Swan
- Born: 1 October 1952 (age 74)
- Original team: Ormond
- Height: 197 cm (6 ft 6 in)
- Weight: 81 kg (179 lb)
- Position: Ruck / forward

Playing career^{1}
Years	Club	Games (Goals)
1973	Melbourne	13 (21)
- ^{1} Playing statistics correct to the end of 1973.

Glenn Swan (born 1 October 1952) is a former Australian rules footballer who played with Melbourne in the Victorian Football League (VFL).
