= Charlie Swan =

Charlie Swan may refer to:

- Charlie Swan (horse trainer), Irish National Hunt trainer and former jockey
- Charlie Swan (Twilight), a fictional character from the Twilight series by Stephenie Meyer

== See also ==
- Charles Swan (disambiguation)
- Charlie (given name)
