= Carole Swan =

President of the Canadian Food Inspection Agency
- In office June 4, 2007 – July 10, 2011
- Preceded by: François Guimont
- Succeeded by: George Da Pont

Personal details
- Born: Winnipeg, Manitoba, Canada

Carole Swan (born in Winnipeg, Manitoba) is a Canadian public servant was the President of the Canadian Food Inspection Agency from June 4, 2007 to July 10, 2011.

== Career ==
Before retiring from the Public Service, Swan served as President of the Canadian Food Inspection Agency since appointment in June 2007. Swan held other senior positions within Senior Associate Deputy Minister at Industry Canada and the Treasury Board, as well as in a number of departments and agencies including the Privy Council Office, the Office of Privatization and Regulatory Affairs, the Department of Regional and Industrial Expansion, the Ministry of State for Economic Development, Status of Women Canada and the Department of Communications.

== Education ==
Swan received a Master's degree in Economics and a Bachelors Honours degree in Economics, both from the University of Manitoba.
