= Rick Swann =

Northern Irish trumpet player (born 1989)

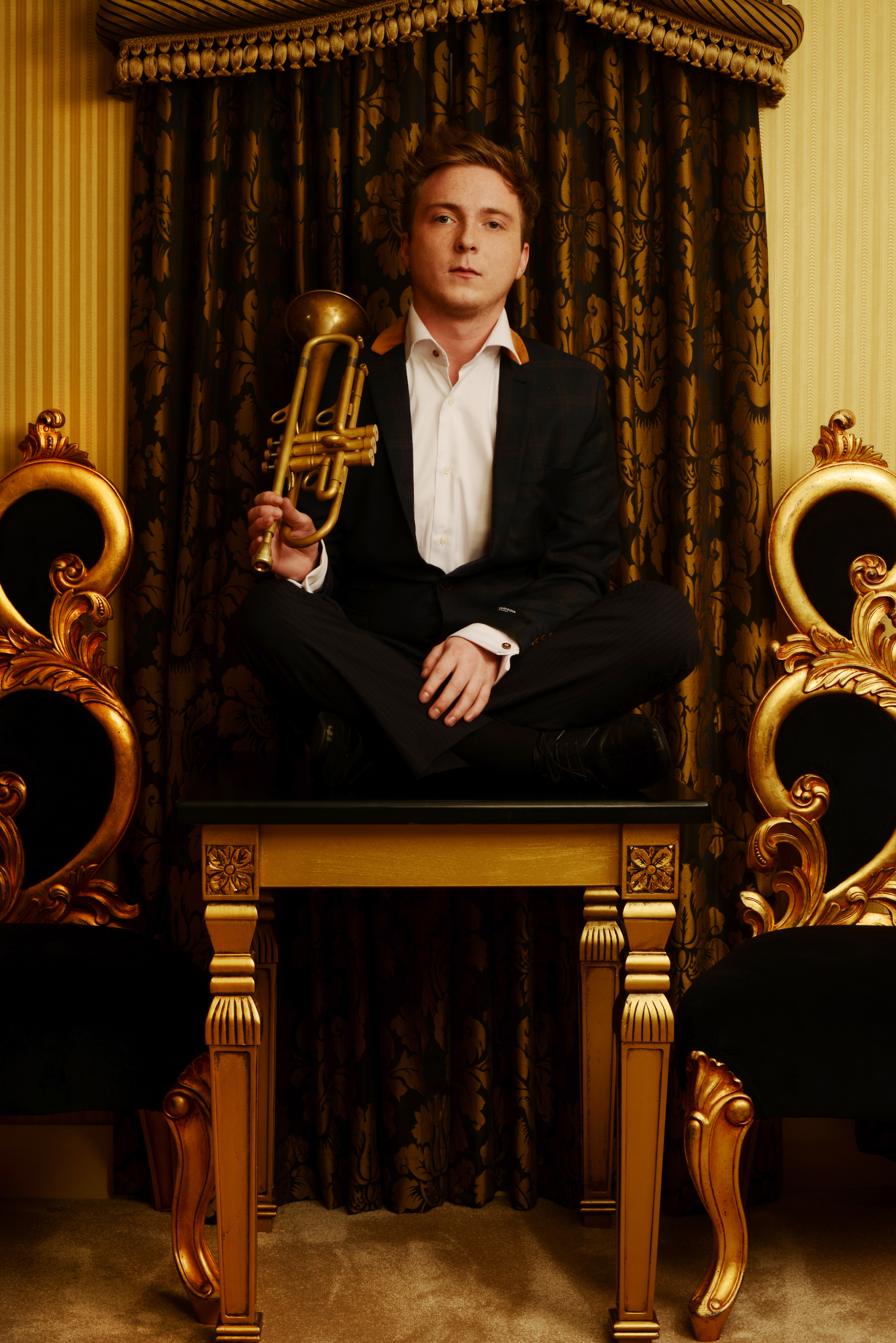
- Legacy Promotional – Photography by Joshua McMichael

Background information
- Born: 10 October 1989 (age 36); Northern Ireland
- Genres: Jazz, blues, house music
- Occupation: Musician
- Instruments: Trumpet, piano, vocalist
- Years active: 2002–present
- Label: Independent
- Website: Rick Swann's Official Website

Rick Swann (born 10 October 1989) is a Northern Irish trumpet player. Born in Coleraine, his professional career began playing with numerous Jazz groups in Northern Ireland before appearing at high-profile events such as Cork Jazz Festival, City of Derry Jazz and Big Band Festival and performing in venues including London's Royal Albert Hall and Belfast's Odyssey Arena whilst still in his early teens.

As a session musician, Swann has recorded with many international artists including Rend Collective Experiment, Tim Hughes, Joanne Hogg and the Belfast Community Gospel Choir. In addition to session recording, Swann performs a number of high-profile residencies in Irish venues including El Divino, (Belfast), The Albany, (Belfast) Filthy McNasty's (Belfast) and The Wright Venue (Dublin).

Swann is also the founder of Belfast Jazz/Blues Jam Session, a weekly jam session which was created to provide opportunity for both professional & amateur musicians in Northern Ireland. Furthermore, Swann performs & produces theatre productions throughout the year recently having showcased the life of Louis Armstrong and Ella Fitzgerald.
