= Julie Swann =

American systems engineer

Julie LeAnne Swann is an American systems engineer and operations researcher who studies optimization-based improvements to supply chains, logistics, health care, the mathematical modelling of infectious disease, and disaster relief. She is A. Doug Allison Distinguished Professor and head of the Edward P. Fitts Department of Industrial and Systems Engineering at North Carolina State University. She was elected President-Elect of the Institute for Operations Research and the Management Sciences in 2023. Swann was named Interim Assistant Vice Chancellor for Research Computing and Data in 2025.

== Education and career ==
Swann majored in industrial engineering at Georgia Tech, graduating in 1996. She went to Northwestern University for graduate study in industrial engineering and management, earning a master's degree in 1998 and completing her Ph.D. in 2001.

After completing her doctorate, Swann returned to Georgia Tech as a faculty member in industrial and systems engineering, in 2002. There, she became the Harold R. and Mary Anne Nash Professor in the Stewart School of Industrial & Systems Engineering, and co-founded the Center for Health and Humanitarian Logistics. She moved to her present position at North Carolina State University in 2017. She continues to hold an adjunct position at Georgia Tech, and has also taught at the Università della Svizzera italiana in Switzerland.

== Recognition ==
Swann became a Fellow of the Institute of Industrial Systems Engineers in 2020. In 2022 she was named a Fellow of the American Institute for Medical and Biological Engineering, "for contributions to delivery of effective and equitable healthcare to populations with limited resources and improved systems for humanitarian response", and of the Institute for Operations Research and the Management Sciences (INFORMS), "for her significant research and impact on health and humanitarian systems, outstanding educational contributions, excellence in service and academic leadership, and distinguished contributions in advocacy of the profession to the public".
