= William Swan (silversmith) =

American silversmith

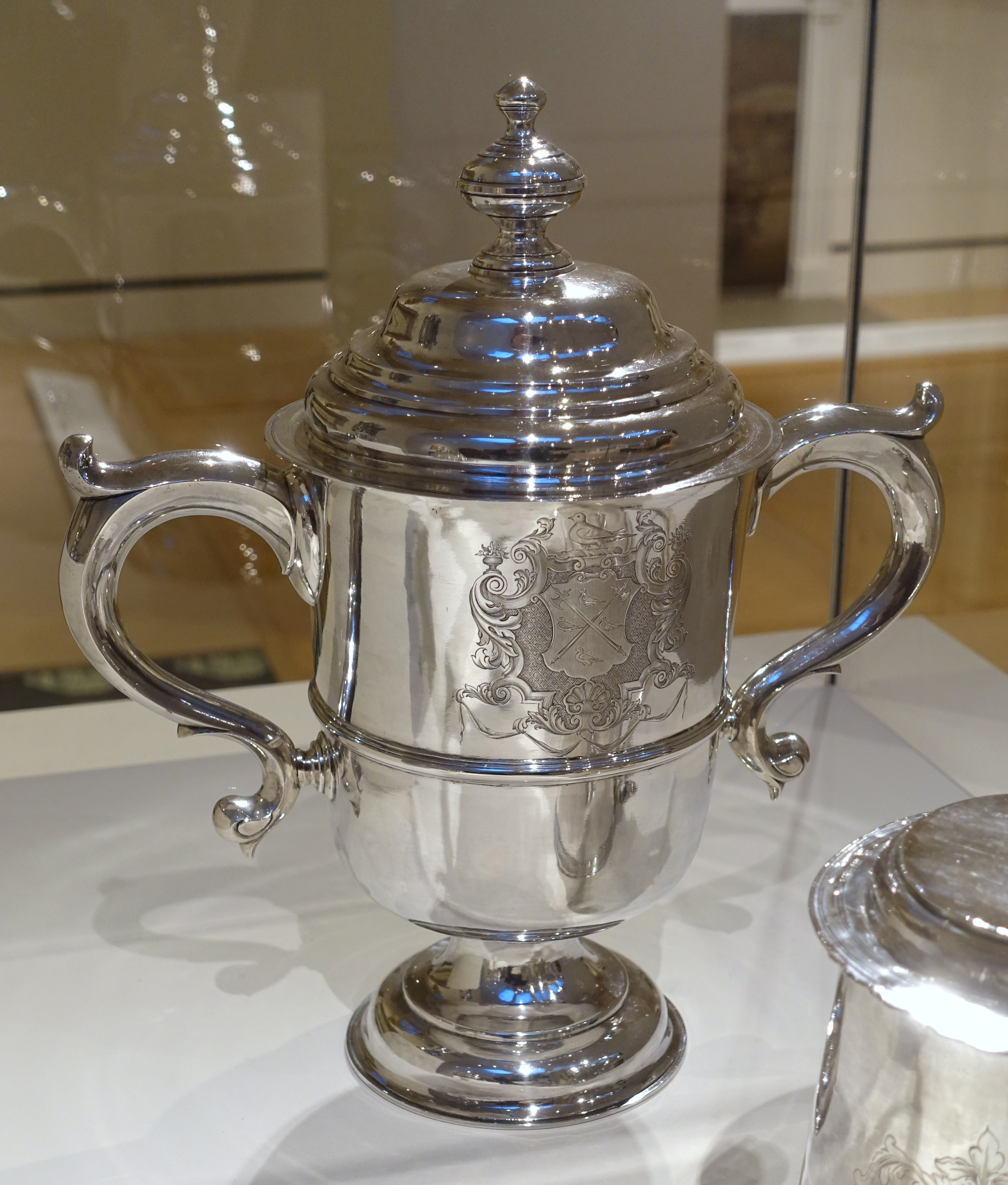
Grace cup by William Swan, 1749

William Swan (August 14, 1715 - April 18, 1774) was a silversmith from the Thirteen Colonies, active in Massachusetts.

Swan was born in Charlestown, Massachusetts, and worked circa 1740-1752 as a silversmith in Boston, where he married Levinah Keyes on December 4, 1743. He worked circa 1752-1754 as a silversmith in Marlborough, Massachusetts, where he moved on account of smallpox, then circa 1754 as a silversmith in Worcester, where he was appointed in 1772 as Clerk of the Market and in 1773 as Sealer of Weights and Measures. He died in Worcester, with his obituary in the Boston Weekly News-Letter (May 5, 1774) reading: "Goldsmith, formerly of Boston, a Man of a very respectable Character." Through his sister, he was an elder relative of Vermont congressman Jonathan Hunt and thus William Morris Hunt.

Swan's work is collected in the Museum of Fine Arts, Boston, Metropolitan Museum of Art, Winterthur Museum, and Worcester Art Museum.
