= John Swan (engineer) =

Nautical engineer and inventor

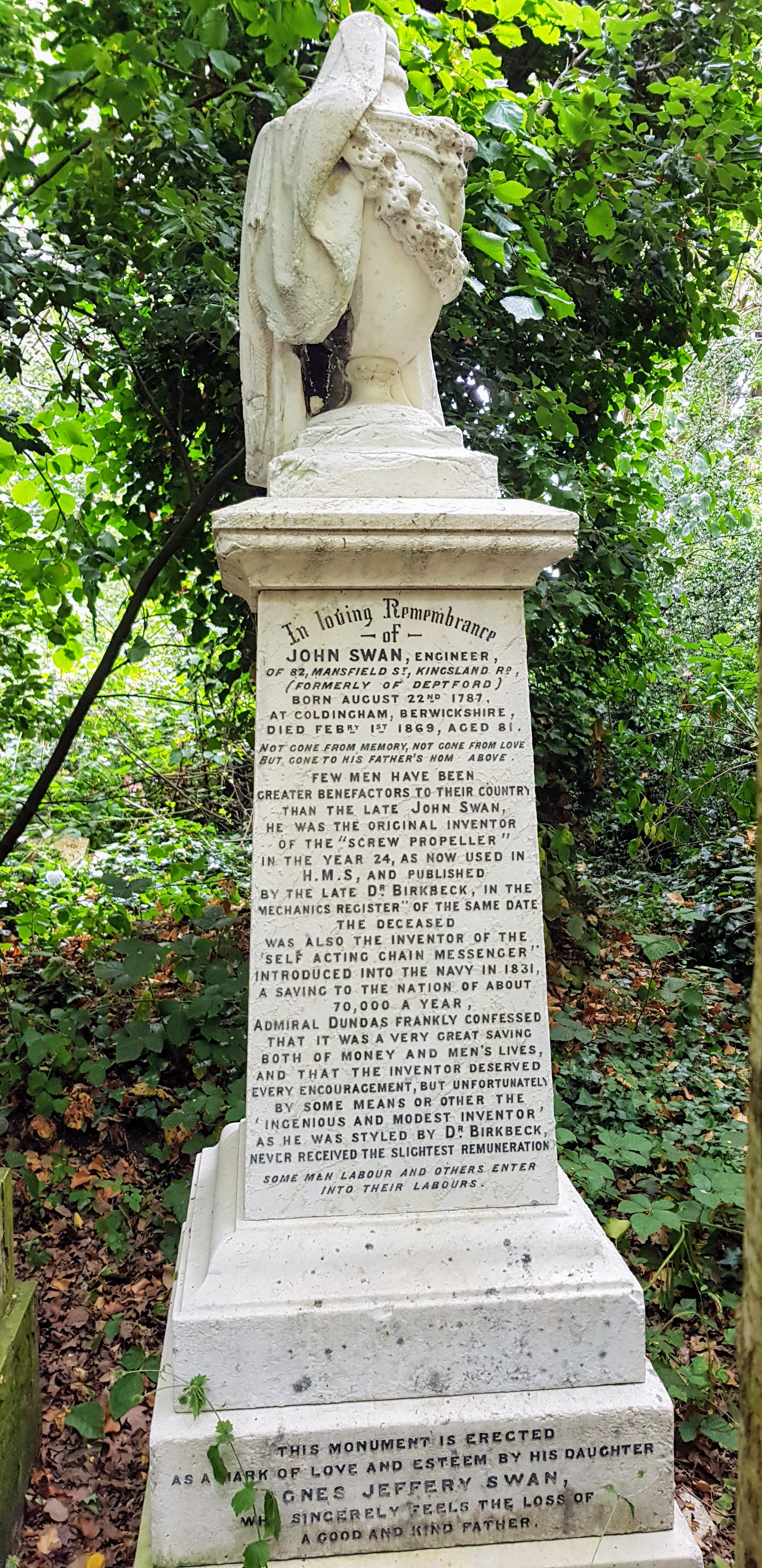

John Swan (1787–1869) was an engineer who worked for the shipbuilder Charles Gordon & Co. in Deptford. In 1824, he demonstrated the efficacy of the screw propeller using a model boat on a pond in the grounds of Mr Gordon's house in Dulwich. Others present included Captain Forbes of the Royal Navy and Dr. George Birkbeck, who wrote in praise of the invention in The Mechanics' Register,

The velocity and steadiness of the motion so far exceeded that of the same model when impelled by paddle-wheels driven by the same spring, that I could not doubt its superiority; and the stillness of the water was such as to give to the vessel the appearance of being moved by some magical power.

Swan is buried in Abney Park Cemetery and his memorial is listed for preservation as Grade II. His inscription reads:

Few men have been greater benefactors to their country than the late John Swan. He was the original inventor of the "screw propeller "in the year '24, as now used in HMS, and published by the late Dr Birkbeck, in the Mechanics Register of the same date. The Deceased was also the inventor of the "self acting chain messenger" introduced into the navy in 1831, a saving to the nation of about £70,000 a year. Admiral Dundas frankly compensed that it was a very great saving both of money and men's lives and that the inventor deserved every encouragement, but unfortunately by some means or other the "ingenious and modest inventor" as he was styled by Dr Birkbeck never received the slightest remuneration.
