= Greg Swann (blogger) =

Greg Swann is the lead author for a leading US based realty website Bloodhound Blog and also DistinctivePhoenix.com, which is devoted to historic and architecturally-distinctive homes in Central and North Central Phoenix. In 2007 Swann was one of ten blog coaches for Active Rain's Project Blogger competition. He also writes for a number of other real estate focused magazines and websites.

Greg Swann is a Phoenix-area real estate broker and is frequently interviewed for news items (including the New York Times) relating to this area.

When Ben Behrouzi's Brabus Ventures filed a controversial lawsuit in defense of their ePerks brand against minor blogger Vlad Zablotskyy on June 4, 2008, Swann established a legal defense fund for Zablotskyy and instigated a community led re-branding of the company as eJerks.
