= John Swan (priest) =

John Alfred Swan was an Anglican priest in the twentieth century.

Swan was educated at the Australian College of Theology. He was ordained a deacon in 1940, and a priest in 1941. After curacies in Nundah and Ipswich, he held incumbencies in Gin Gin, Inglewood, Childers, Woolloongabba, Camp Hill, and Indooroopilly. He was Archdeacon of Lilley from 1968 to 1976; and then of Brisbane.
