= Chris Swan (footballer) =

English footballer

Personal information
- Full name: Christopher Samuel Swan
- Date of birth: 4 December 1900
- Place of birth: Byker, England
- Date of death: 1979 (aged 78–79)
- Position: Inside forward

Senior career*
Years	Team	Apps	(Gls)
1918–1919	Tyneside Juniors (Wallsend)		
1919–1922	Newcastle United	4	(0)
1922–1925	Stockport County	32	(4)
1925–1929	Hull City	73	(8)
1929–1930	Crystal Palace	6	(0)
1930–1931	Waterford		
1931	Scarborough		
Total		115	(12)
- * Club domestic league appearances and goals

Christopher Samuel Swan (4 December 1900 – 1979) was an English footballer who played in the Football League for Crystal Palace, Hull City, Newcastle United and Stockport County.
