= Hugh Swann =

Indian rosewood log for the cabinet to hold the Royal coin collection

Hugh Sinclair Swann (11 March 1925 – 13 June 2007), otherwise known as Tim Swann, became the cabinet maker to Elizabeth II of the United Kingdom. His work was inspired by his admiration for Barnsley, Gimson and Russell. He fitted many of the most important of Britain's coin collections including the Fitz-william, Cambridge, the Barber Institute, Birmingham, and the Hunterian Museum, Glasgow. More importantly yet, he supplied the Royal Mint with nearly 80 cabinets to house its complete collection.

His work for Elizabeth II began in 1975 when a complete reorganisation of the Royal coin collection at Windsor Castle was begun. The cabinets were created from specially purchased Honduras mahogany and Indian rosewood. On one occasion a log was delivered to his workshop addressed "Her Majesty the Queen of England, 3 Hexham Road, Heddon-on-the-Wall".

He made the crosier and pectoral cross for Bishop Leonard.

== Family ==
Several of Swann's relatives were prominent in their own rights:

- His brother Michael Swann was chair of the BBC.
- His uncle Brigadier Vivian Dykes was chief combined secretary to the British Joint Staff Mission in Washington in 1942.
- His stepfather was Sir Sydney Castle Roberts, secretary of Cambridge University Press, an author and vice-chancellor of the University of Cambridge.
- His brother-in-law was Monsignor Graham Leonard, who was the Bishop of London before converting to Roman Catholicism.
