= Schwann =

Schwann may refer to:

- The Schwann cell
- Henry Schwann, English cricketer
- Theodor Schwann, a German physiologist, histologist and cytologist
- Schwann Records, a German record label
- The Schwann catalog, a listing of in-print sound recordings in the United States, published from the late 1940s through 2001

== See also ==
- Schwan (disambiguation)
