= Hepzibah Swan =

American socialite

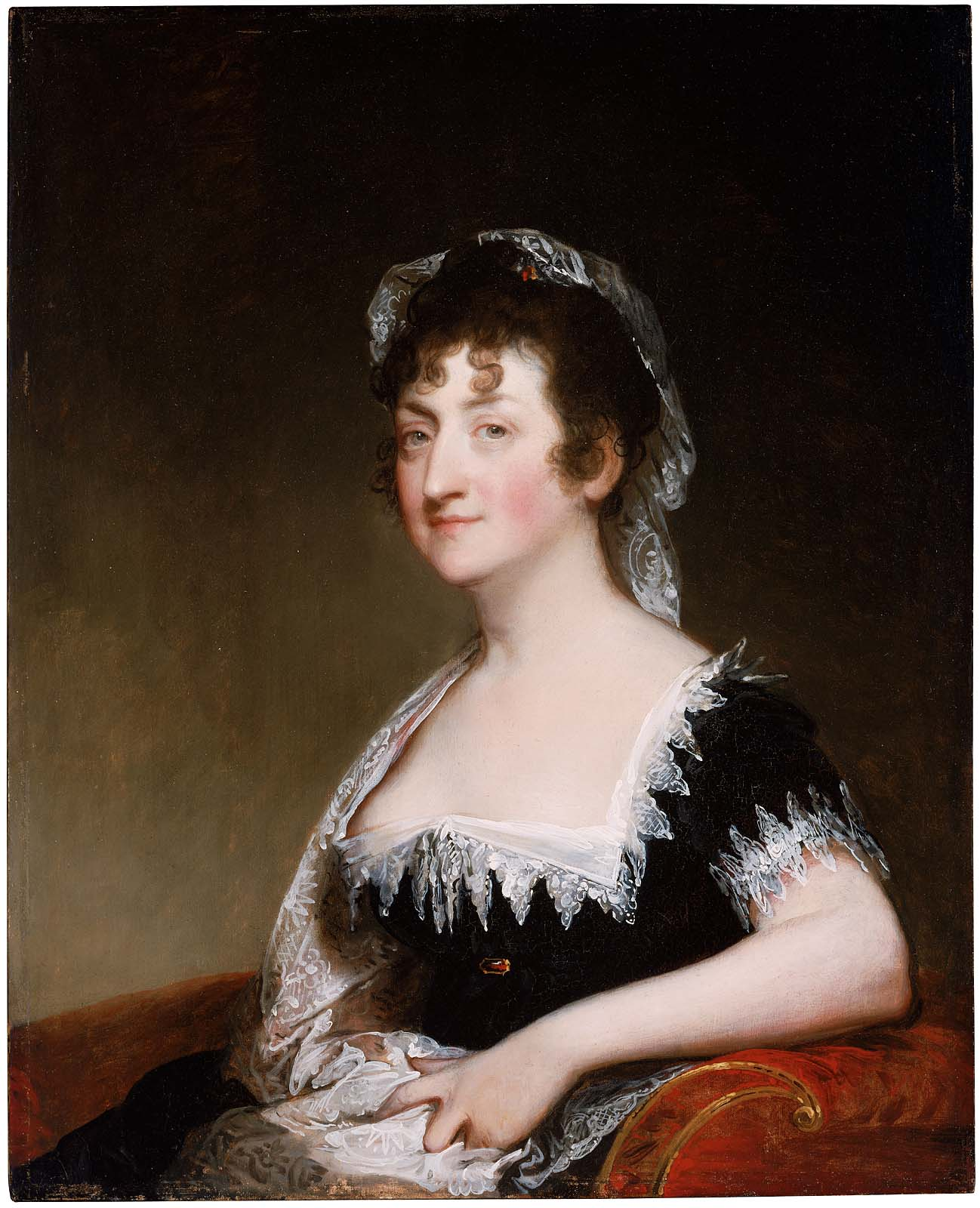
Portrait of Hepzibah Clarke Swan by Gilbert Stuart, 1808 (Museum of Fine Arts, Boston)

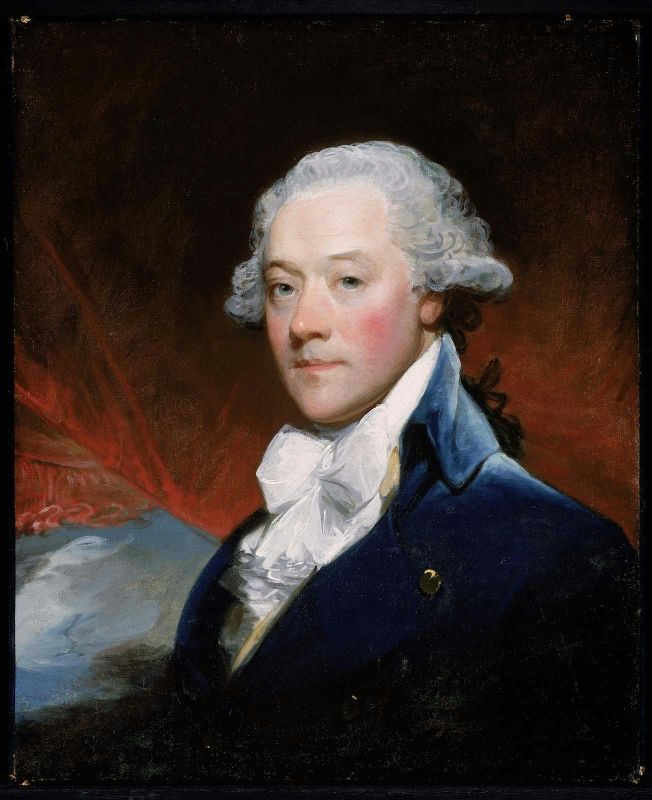
Portrait of James Swan by Gilbert Stuart, 1795. Part of the Swan Collection, bequest of great-granddaughter Miss Elizabeth Howard Bartol (Museum of Fine Arts, Boston)

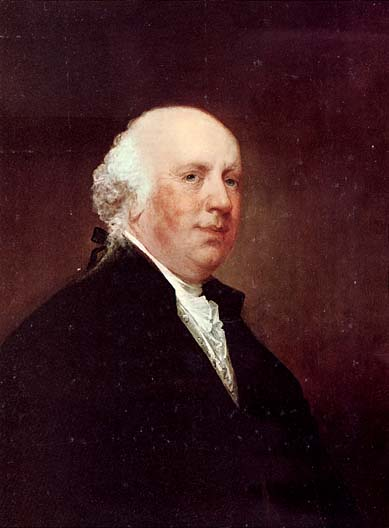
Portrait of General Henry Jackson by Gilbert Stuart, c. 1805

Hepzibah Swan née Clarke (died August 14, 1825) was an American socialite of Boston, Massachusetts. She was a wealthy and well connected heiress who was among the most cosmopolitan, intelligent, and erudite of ladies in Federal Boston. Madame Swan was said to be charismatic, not least because of her wealth but also in good measure because of her effusive personal charm. Lifelong friends included revolutionary war heroes Henry Knox, Henry Jackson, Charles Bulfinch, Sarah Wentworth Apthorp Morton, and Harrison Otis.

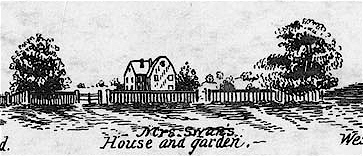
Mrs. Swan's house and garden, Tremont Street, Boston, 1800

== Life ==
In 1776 she married Scotland-born James Swan, and in the course of the marriage had four children: Hepzibah, Christiana, Sarah and James.

Swan commissioned several portraits from painter Gilbert Stuart, including one of her husband, and those of her friends Henry Knox and Henry Jackson, and others. Her own portrait was also painted by Stuart, and is now in the collection of the Museum of Fine Arts, Boston.

Hepzibah and James Swan were both pro French; Mrs. Swan in particular was a devout Francophile all her life. During the war, they entertained French naval officers stationed at Newport who brought their ships to Boston for repair, refitting and supplies. On his return to Boston James built a grand countryseat on Dudley Street in Dorchester not far from Royal Governor Shirley's mansion. Swan had purchased the land in 1781 when he was adjutant general of the Commonwealth. It was a 60-acre estate with a house near the road that the State of Massachusetts had confiscated from Loyalist Nathaniel Hatch. Hatch and 1000 other Tories had fled with the British army to Halifax, Nova Scotia in 1776.

Planned in large part in the French style by Mrs. Swan, she consulted with another protégé and close friend, the architect Charles Bulfinch, who is given attribution for the design of the most remarkable house of its time in the region. The mansion was set on a high earth berm facing east across Dorchester Bay. Completed in 1796, its signature architectural feature was a two-story circular drawing room 32 feet in circumference with a domed ceiling. The bow was pulled out from two traditional Federal style wings and surrounded by a colonnade. Everyone called it the Round House and Mrs. Swan filled it with French furnishings; much of it appropriated by the republican French government from royal palaces and sold to Swan's import company. Several pieces are now in the collections of the Sargent House Museum, Gloucester, MA and the Museum of Fine Arts, Boston.

Mrs. Swan bought out two of the original investors in the largest and most far reaching real estate venture in postwar Boston when she became the only female member of the four person Mount Vernon Proprietors that acquired the John Singleton Copley pasture in 1796. It was subdivided into townhouse lots that became very valuable when the State House opened in 1798. Mrs. Swan built three houses on the land for her daughters at 13, 15 + 17 Chestnut Street (built in 1805 and 1807) and her own townhouse at 16 Chestnut Street in 1817. Jackson assessed the property and handled all financial transactions on all four homes, each designed by Charles Bulfinch, who seemed now to be among the members of her salon.

In 1791, no doubt at the urging of Mrs. Swan, Jackson and others helped pass legislation which repealed the 1750 law against theater performances. Roxbury state senator William Heath was probably helpful. Jackson was trustee of the Boston Theatre – Boston's first – designed by Charles Bulfinch, at the corner of Federal and Franklin streets, that opened in 1793.

Jackson managed the household affairs as well. He was very close to the daughters. He organized and managed the marriage of oldest daughter Hepzibah to Dr. John Clarke Howard, grandson of John Clarke in 1800 and in 1802 the wedding of Sarah Swan to William Sullivan son of James Sullivan. Mrs. Swan disapproved of her middle daughter's fiancé John Turner Sargent (his brothers were Daniel Sargent, Henry Sargent and Lucius Manlius Sargent, first cousin of Judith Sargent Murray, nephew of Paul Dudley Sargent). Yet despite that Christiana – obviously as strong willed as her mother – married him anyway, in 1806, and Mrs. Swan built them a townhouse on Chestnut Street. (John and Christiana named their second son Henry Jackson Sargent)

Her son James Keadie Swan married Caroline Knox, the daughter of Henry Knox, in 1808. At the time of the wedding Mrs. Swan commissioned Gilbert Stuart to paint a portrait of her son and also of herself.

Hepzibah Swan had Henry Jackson interred in a tomb she built in her back garden. The tomb was raised on an earth berm surrounded by a hedge of lilacs and surmounted by an obelisk of blue marble probably quarried and made in Italy. On it was carved "Henry Jackson. Soldier, Patriot, Friend". A lane of lilacs led from the house to the tomb that Mrs. Swan often visited and pointed out to guests. One of them was the Gilbert du Motier, Marquis de Lafayette in June 1825, on his triumphal visit to Boston for the 50th anniversary of the Battle of Bunker Hill. He visited Mrs. Swan on his way to Quincy to see John Adams. The Marquis and Mrs. Swan talked in French for over an hour and no doubt Mrs. Swan walked him out to look at the tomb of Revolutionary War General Henry Jackson.

Hepzibah Swan died two months later, probably of cholera, on August 14, 1825. She was buried in General Jackson's tomb. The house and grounds were left to Christiana Sargent who lived there until her death in 1867 at the age of 89.

Her home on Chestnut Street is a site on the Boston Women's Heritage Trail.
