= Michael Swann =

British biologist (1920–1990)

The Right Honourable The Lord Swann FRS FRSE
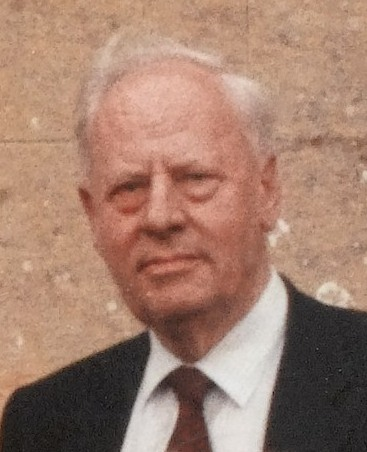
- Swann in 1987
- Born: Michael Meredith Swann; 1 March 1920
- Died: 2 September 1990 (aged 70)
- Education: King's College School, Cambridge; Winchester College
- Alma mater: Gonville and Caius College, Cambridge
- Known for: The mechanisms of cell division and fertilisation
- Spouse: Tess Gleadowe (m. 1942)
- Children: 4
- Scientific career
- Workplaces: University of Cambridge; University of Edinburgh

Michael Meredith Swann, Baron Swann, FRS, FRSE (1 March 1920 – 22 September 1990) was a British molecular and cell biologist. He was appointed chairman of the BBC, awarded a knighthood and subsequently a life peerage.

== Early life ==
Swann was born in Cambridge, the eldest of three children of pathologist Meredith Blake Robson Swann and his wife, Marjorie Dykes.

Swann was educated at King's College School, Cambridge, and then at Winchester College, a boarding independent school for boys in the city of Winchester in Hampshire, where he was an exhibitioner. He then studied zoology at Gonville and Caius College, Cambridge, where he graduated MA and PhD.

== Life and works ==
He served with the British Army during World War II, rising to the rank of lieutenant colonel, and being Mentioned in Dispatches. From 1946 Swann lectured in zoology at the University of Cambridge, his alma mater.

He moved to Edinburgh University as professor of natural history in 1952. In 1953 he was elected a fellow of the Royal Society of Edinburgh. His proposers were James Ritchie, John Gaddum, Sir Maurice Yonge and Harold Callan. He won the society's Makdougall Brisbane Prize for 1970/72. In 1962 he was elected a fellow of the Royal Society of London.

His academic work was on the mechanisms of cell division and fertilisation. He used cell polarisation methods to understand the changes in molecular organisation of the mitotic spindle. With his collaborator Murdoch Mitchison, he found evidence in support of a new theory of cell division. He collaborated with Victor Rothschild in experiments on changes in membrane structure during fertilisation.

From 1965 to 1974, he was the principal and vice-chancellor of Edinburgh University. In 1968, he was awarded an honorary doctorate of science from the University of Leicester. During his term as principal, he encountered difficulty with students led by Gordon Brown, who had unusually been elected as rector of the university. He received a knighthood in the 1972 Birthday Honours, having the honour conferred by the Queen herself on 5 December 1972.

He was chairman of the governors of the BBC from 1973 to 1980 having been appointed by Conservative Prime Minister Edward Heath, who admired his strong leadership during student protests at Edinburgh University. Notably his tenure was during the height of [Jimmy Savile] fame. He was created a life peer as Baron Swann, of Coln St Denys in the County of Gloucestershire on 16 February 1981. In 1980 Swann became Provost of Oriel College, although he resigned after nine months, and was also Chancellor of the University of York from 1979 until his death. In 1981, he was made an honorary fellow of Trinity College Dublin.

In 1969 he led the Swann Report "on The Flow into Employment of Scientists, Engineers and Technologists". In 1985 he led the Swann Report "Education for All", a report of the Committee of Enquiry into the Education of Children from Ethnic Minority Groups.

He died in London on 22 September 1990.

== Legacy ==
The Michael Swann Building of the University of Edinburgh at Kings Buildings is named after him. It continues to be used for work on cell division and fertilisation to this day.

== Family ==
In 1942, he married Tess Gleadowe (died 2009). They had two sons and two daughters.

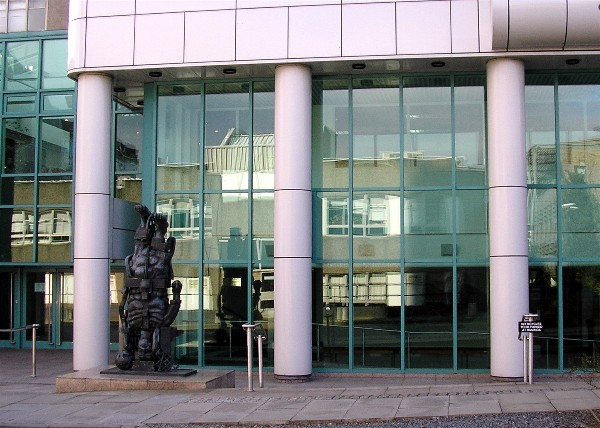
The Swann building is the main home of biological sciences at the Edinburgh University.

Several of Swann's relatives were prominent in their own rights:

- His brother Hugh Swann was cabinet maker to Queen Elizabeth II.
- His uncle Brigadier Vivian Dykes was chief combined secretary to the British Joint Staff Mission in Washington in 1942.
- His stepfather was Sir Sydney Castle Roberts, secretary of Cambridge University Press, an author and vice-chancellor of the University of Cambridge.
- His brother-in-law was Monsignor Graham Leonard, who was the Bishop of London before converting to Roman Catholicism.

Media offices
Preceded by Lord Hill	Chairman of the BBC Board of Governors; 1973–1980	Succeeded by George Howard
Academic offices
Preceded by Edward Victor Appleton	Principals of the University of Edinburgh; 1965–1974	Succeeded by Sir Hugh Robson
Preceded by The Right Honourable The Lord Clark	Chancellor of University of York; 1979–1990	Succeeded by Janet Baker
