= Swan baronets =

Extinct baronetcy in the Baronetage of England

The Swan Baronetcy, of Southfleet in the County of Kent, was a title in the Baronetage of England. It was created on 1 March 1666 for William Swan. The title became extinct on the death of the second Baronet in 1712.

== Swan baronets, of Southfleet (1666) ==
Escutcheon of the Swan baronets of Southfleet

- Sir William Swan, 1st Baronet (1631–1680)
- Sir William Swan, 2nd Baronet (1667–1712)

== See also ==
- Swann baronets
