= John Swann (cricketer) =

English footballer and cricketer

John Lassam Swann (3 October 1926 – 4 July 2011) was an English cricketer and footballer.
