= Charles Swann (cricketer) =

English cricketer

Personal information
- Full name: Charles Frederick Swann
- Born: 6 August 1883; Leyton, Essex, England
- Died: 7 March 1960 (aged 76); Leytonstone, Essex, England
- Batting: Right-handed
- Bowling: Right-arm medium

Domestic team information
- Years: Team
- 1912: Essex

Career statistics
Competition	First-class
Matches	1
Runs scored	0
Batting average	0.00
100s/50s	–/–
Top score	0
Balls bowled	–
Wickets	–
Bowling average	–
5 wickets in innings	–
10 wickets in match	–
Best bowling	–
Catches/stumpings	–/–
- Source: Cricinfo, 1 December 2010

Charles Frederick Swann (6 August 1883 – 7 March 1960) was an English cricketer. Swann was a right-handed batsman who bowled right-arm medium-pace. He was born at Leyton, Essex.

Swann made a single first-class appearance for Essex in 1912 against Yorkshire at the Fartown Ground, Huddersfield. In his only first-class innings, Swann was dismissed for a duck by Alonzo Drake.

He died at Leytonstone, Essex on 7 March 1960.
