= James Swan (financier) =

Early American patriot and financier

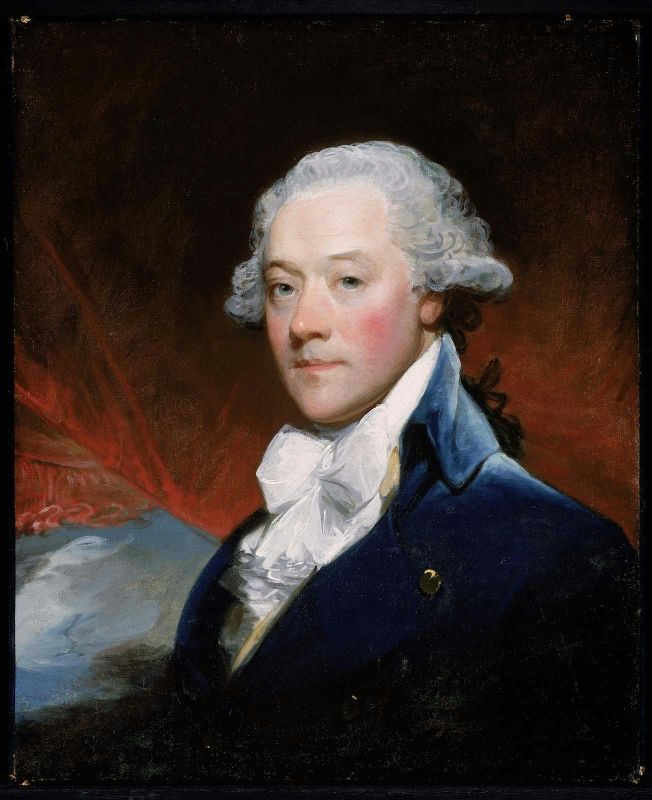
Portrait of James Swan by Gilbert Stuart, 1795. Part of the Swan Collection, bequest of great-granddaughter Miss Elizabeth Howard Bartol (Museum of Fine Arts, Boston)

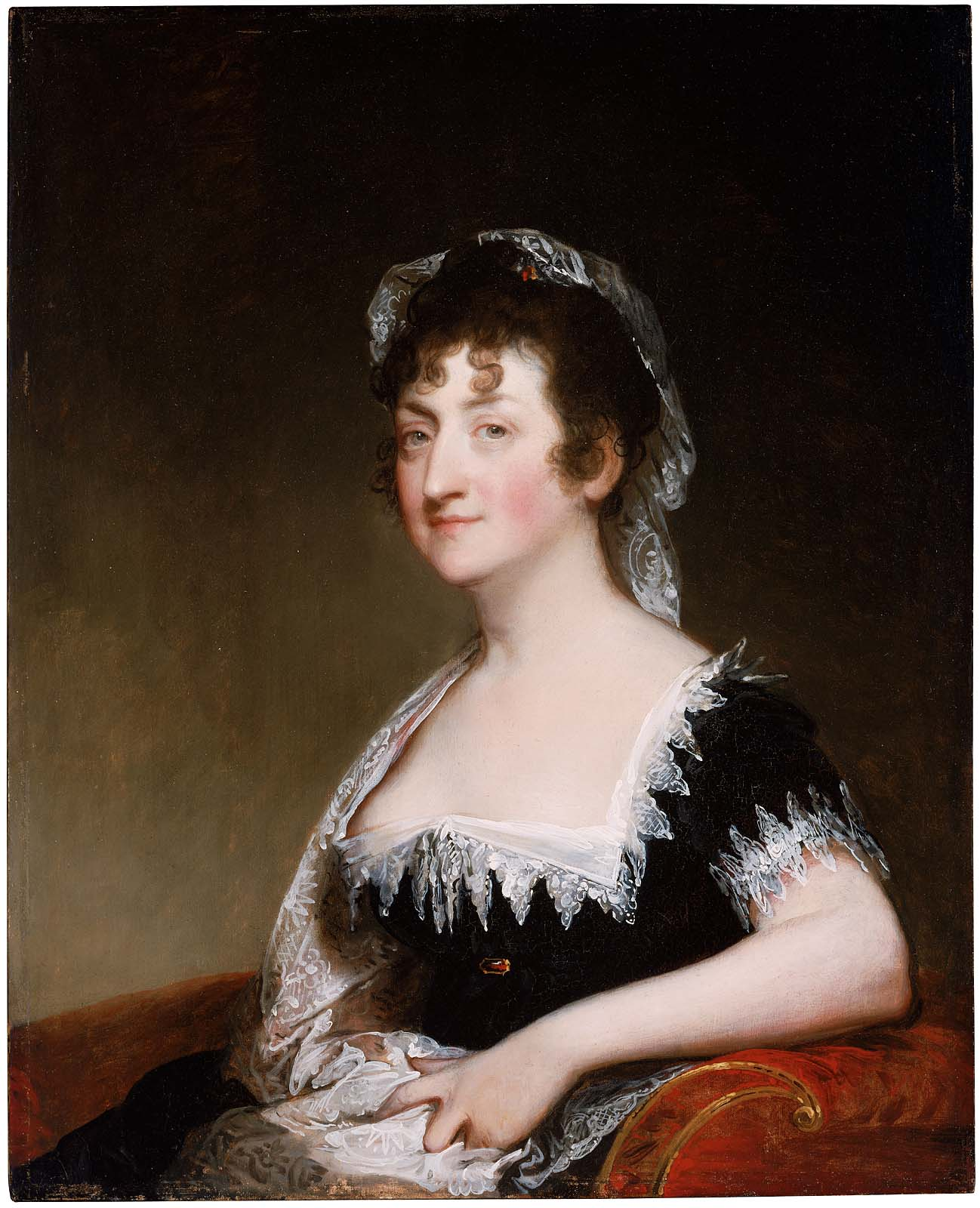
Portrait of Hepzibah Clarke Swan by Gilbert Stuart, 1808 (Museum of Fine Arts, Boston)

James Swan (1754 – 31 July 1830) was an early American patriot and financier based in Boston in the 18th and 19th centuries. He was a member of the Sons of Liberty and participated in the Boston Tea Party. Swan was twice wounded at the Battle of Bunker Hill, he next became secretary of the Massachusetts Board of War and the legislature. During the time he held that office, he drew heavily on his private funds to aid the Continental Army, which was then in dire need of funds to arm and equip the soldiers who were arriving in Boston from all parts of New England. In 1795, Swan, acting as agent for France, helped refinance the United States’ debt to France, which amounted to 2,024,900 dollars ($38.4 million in 2025). The US government gave him, as agent for France, newly issued US Government interest-bearing shares equal in value to the amount due on the French debt. Swan then arranged the sale of the shares to investors and the payment of the proceeds to France. In effect, the US replaced its debt to France with the US’s obligations under the new shares owned by private investors. The United States no longer owed money to foreign governments, although it continued to owe money to private investors both in the United States and in Europe. This allowed the young United States to place itself on a sound financial footing. On principles of loyalty, he spent 22 years—more than a quarter of his life—in the Paris Sainte-Pélagie Prison.

== Biography ==
=== Boston, 1765–1787 ===
Swan emigrated from Fife, Scotland to Massachusetts in 1765. He worked at Thaxter & Son in Boston, as an apprentice where he became friends with Benjamin Thompson, later knighted Count Rumford to the King of Bavaria, and Henry Knox, a lifelong friend later a general in the Continental Army. He was a member of the Sons of Liberty, participated in the Boston Tea Party, and served in the Battle of Bunker Hill in 1775. Friends and associates included Perez Morton, John Adams, Samuel Adams, Paul Revere, John Hancock, Joseph Warren, James Otis, Jr., George Washington, James Monroe, Paul Dudley Sargent, Gilbert du Motier, Marquis de Lafayette, Henry Jackson, James Sullivan, Charles Bulfinch, and Thomas Jefferson, The Library of Congress has several items by James Swan including those in Thomas Jefferson's collection.

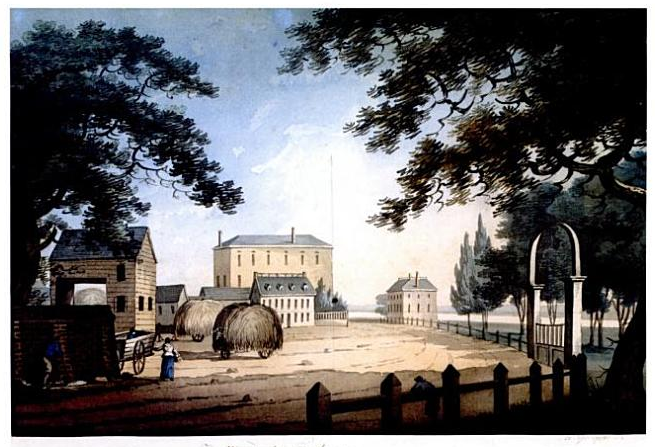
Tremont Street in 1798 (shows the vicinity of West Street and Haymarket Theatre, looking south)

In 1776 he married Hepzibah Clarke; they had four children: Hepzibah (Hepsy), born c. 1777; Christiana (Kitty), born c. 1778; Sarah (Sally), born c. 1782; James Keadie, born c. 1783. Around this time Swan resided in the vicinity of Tremont Street in the former house of Stephen Greenleaf. "On the site of Temple Place a colonial house surrounded by a brick wall and a grove of trees was built in 1684, and here dwelt General James Swan. The house ... staged many a thrilling scene during the struggle for independence. The Swan estate comprised over an acre, extending from St. Paul's Church to and along West Street." (The estate became Washington Gardens after 1815).

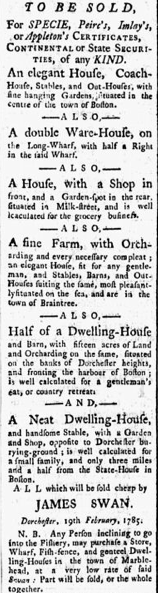
Notice from Swan about property for sale in the Boston area (Continental Journal, 1785)

He held several posts in the Massachusetts government, c. 1777–1778, including the Massachusetts Board of War and the legislature. He belonged to the Scots Charitable Society of Boston. Swan was active in privateer enterprises during the Revolution. He bonded or owned numerous vessels with his Boston associates such as Mungo Mackay, Elias Parkman, Paul Dudley Sargent, Thomas Adams. In 1786 Swan purchased islands on the Maine coast, including Swan's Island.

=== France, 1787–1830 ===
After various ventures in finance and real estate, and years of living in high style, in 1787 or 1788 the indebted Swan moved to France. En route, he stayed at Mt. Vernon as a guest of George Washington. In France his social circle included Lafayette. Swan was successful in his business activities related to the millions of dollars owed by the United States to France. While in France, Swan acquired furniture, now held in the collection of the Museum of Fine Arts, Boston.

Swan returned to the U.S. in 1794 or 1795. He travelled to Philadelphia and while there posed for portraitist Gilbert Stuart; the finished painting is now in the collection of the Museum of Fine Arts, Boston. Around 1796 he built a summer home in Dorchester, possibly designed by Charles Bulfinch.

He again went to France in 1798. He was imprisoned in Paris for debt in 1808, and released c. 1830. He died in Paris in 1830.

== Writings ==
- A dissuasion to Great-Britain and the colonies, from the slave trade to Africa (1773)
- National arithmetick or, Observations on the finances of the commonwealth of Massachusetts: with some hints respecting financiering and future taxation in this state: tending to render the publick contributions more easy to the people (1786)
- Causes qui se sont opposeés aux progrès du commerce entre la France, et les États-Unis de l'Amérique (1790)
- An Address to the President, Senate and House of Representatives, of the United States, on The means of Creating a National Paper by Loan Offices, which shall replace that of the discredited Banks, and supercede [sic] the use of Gold and Silver Coin (1819)
