= Charles Swan =

Charles Swan may refer to:

- Charles Swan (pirate) (died 1690), reluctant buccaneer
- Charles Swan (cricketer), former Bermudian cricketer
- Charles Sheridan Swan (1831–1879), co-founder of British shipbuilding firm Swan Hunter
- Charles A. Swan (1838–1914), United States Army private and Medal of Honor recipient

== See also ==
- Charlie Swan (disambiguation)
- A Glimpse Inside the Mind of Charles Swan III, a 2012 American film
