= Calvert Prong =

River in Alabama, United States

Physical characteristics
- Source
  - coordinates: 33.98343°N 86.38609°W
- Mouth
  - coordinates: 33.92065°N 86.60332°W

The Calvert Prong is one of the two prongs whose confluence creates the Little Warrior River in Alabama, United States. The other prong is the Blackburn Fork.
