= Alabama State Route 160 =

Highway in Alabama

State Route 160

Route information
- Maintained by ALDOT
- Length: 18.415 mi (29.636 km)
- Existed: 1971–present

Major junctions
- West end: US 31 in Smoke Rise
- SR 79 at Cleveland
- East end: US 231 at Cleveland

Location
- Country: United States
- State: Alabama
- Counties: Blount

Highway system
- Alabama State Highway System; Interstate; US; State
← SR 159	→ SR 161

State Route 160 (SR 160) is an 18.415-mile-long (29.636 km) state highway in Blount County, in the north-central part of the U.S. state of Alabama. The western terminus of the highway is at an intersection with U.S. Route 31 (US 31) on the southern edge of Smoke Rise. This intersection is just east of US 31's interchange with Interstate 65 (I-65 exit 284). The eastern terminus of the highway is at an intersection with US 231 and Blount County Route 1 (CR 1) in Cleveland. SR 160 is the only state highway that is exclusively located in Blount County.

== Route description ==
SR 160 begins at an intersection with US 31 (internally designated as SR 3) on the southern edge of Smoke Rise. This intersection is just to the east of US 31's interchange with I-65. It travels to the east-northeast, along the southern edge of Smoke Rise. Almost immediately, it crosses over Sibleyville Creek. At an intersection with Thomas Road, the highway enters Smoke Rise proper. Between Pine View Drive and Tumblin Road, it leaves Smoke Rise proper and again travels along the southern edge of it. Just after crossing over Double Branch, the highway leaves Smoke Rise and travels through rural areas of the county. It curves to the northeast and crosses over Coaldale Creek. The highway curves to a nearly due east direction and crosses over Hogeland Creek. It curves back to the northeast and passes Hayden Primary and Hayden Elementary schools. Just after crossing over Merrill Branch, it enters Hayden. It travels under a railroad bridge that carries railroad tracks of CSX. It then passes the Blount County Courthouse Annex just before an intersection with the southern terminus of Blount County Route 7 (CR 7; 3rd Street). SR 160 then passes the town hall of Hayden. It then crosses over Neeley Creek. A short distance later, it leaves the city limits of Hayden. The highway curves to a nearly due east direction and travels through Mount Olive. Upon crossing Pannel Creek, it curves to the northeast and intersects the southern terminus of Blount CR 9. It then crosses over Sugar Creek before entering Sugar Creek. There, it intersects the western terminus of Blount CR 45 and the northern terminus of Brand Road. After intersecting the northern terminus of Blount CR 13, the highway curves to the east-northeast and enters Nectar. It intersects the eastern terminus of Blount CR 45, which forms a loop off of SR 160. The highway crosses over Tucker Creek and curves to the southeast. In the main part of town, it curves to the east and has an intersection with the eastern terminus of Blount CR 11, the southern terminus of Blount CR 37 (Joy Road), and the northern terminus of River Bend Road. It curves back to the northeast and passes Nectar Cemetery. It crosses over Henderson Creek just before passing the Nectar Town Hall. Right after leaving the city limits of Nectar, SR 160 crosses over the Locust Fork of the Black Warrior River. It then curves to the east and enters Cleveland. At an intersection with SR 79, SR 160 curves to the northeast. In the main part of town, it reaches its eastern terminus, an intersection with US 231 (internally designated as SR 53) and the northern terminus of Blount CR 1.

== History ==
Before 1971, this highway was designated as Blount CR 8. The western terminus of SR 160 is currently approximately 25 miles (40 km) north of downtown Birmingham. Until the late 1990s, the path of SR 160 between Hayden and Cleveland traveled through a largely rural area of the county. As urban sprawl from Birmingham has begun to spread into Blount County, numerous new subdivisions have begun to develop along the highway. Much of the growth in northern Jefferson County and Blount County is in expectation of the long-anticipated construction of the Northern Beltline which has been given the designation I-422. The expected date for the completion of this route is 2020.

As a result of the residential and commercial development along this highway, there are plans to widen it to four lanes. However, such plans are still under development. As of June 2009, they are still several years away from becoming reality. Due to increased traffic, and the fact that the highway is still a narrow two-lane through winding, hilly country, there has been an increase in deadly auto accidents along this roadway including an accident on November 29, 2007, which took the lives of three Hayden High School cheerleaders – senior, Courtney Nicely, and sophomores, Whitney Bradford and Sarah Casey. Two years later, on September 19, 2009, Kimberly "Kimmi" Jones Colley was hit head-on, and died two weeks later. That death spurred the formation of an organization for the purpose of holding Governor Bob Riley and the state accountable for a campaign promise made by Riley in April 2006 to fast-track construction work to make SR 160 safe.

== Major intersections ==
The entire route is in Blount County.

Location	mi	km	Destinations	Notes
Smoke Rise	0.000	0.000	US 31 south (SR 3) – Warrior, Birmingham	Western terminus; intersection is adjacent to I-65 interchange; access to US 31/SR 3 north is via I-65 north.
Cleveland	17.638	28.386	SR 79 – Locust Fork, Blountsville	
Cleveland	18.415	29.636	US 231 (SR 53) / CR 1 south – Oneonta, Blountsville	
1.000 mi = 1.609 km; 1.000 km = 0.621 mi: Incomplete access
