= Locust Fork, Alabama =

Town in the United States

- Town
- Logo

- Location of Locust Fork in Blount County, Alabama.
- Coordinates: 33°53′47″N 86°37′30″W
- Country: United States
- State: Alabama
- County: Blount

Area
  - Total: 3.89 sq mi (10.07 km^{2})
  - Land: 3.88 sq mi (10.04 km^{2})
  - Water: 0.012 sq mi (0.03 km^{2})
- Elevation: 584 ft (178 m)

Population (2020)
  - Total: 1,192
  - Density: 307.5/sq mi (118.73/km^{2})
- Time zone: UTC-6 (Central (CST))
  - Summer (DST): UTC-5 (CDT)
- ZIP code: 35097
- Area code: 205, 659
- FIPS code: 01-43888
- GNIS feature ID: 2406036
- Website: www.locustfork.com

Locust Fork is a town in Blount County, Alabama, United States. As of the 2020 census, Locust Fork had a population of 1,192.

== History ==
While traveling south with his troops in 1815, General Andrew Jackson camped along a river in the area. General Jackson carved his name in a locust tree, naming the area Locust Fork. In the early 1800s Nick Hudson built a public inn in what is now Locust Fork. He erected barns to shelter the horses and hogs of the Tennessee farmers who drove them to the deeper South for a more profitable market.

Locust Fork was incorporated January 18, 1977.

== Geography ==
Locust Fork is located southwest of the center of Blount County. It is situated on a bluff overlooking the Blackburn Fork of the Little Warrior River. Just north of town, the Blackburn Fork enters the Little Warrior River, which flows into the Locust Fork of the Black Warrior River 2 miles (3 km) northwest of the town.

Locust Fork is located in one of the northeast-to-southwest valleys that make up the southern end of the Appalachian mountain chain. Sand Mountain forms the southeast side of the valley, and McAnnally Mountain and Hog Mountain form part of a broader, more broken ridge to the northwest. The area has been mined for coal over the past 100 years, but no current active coal mining operations exist in the immediate area, which consists of rolling hill farm country.

According to the U.S. Census Bureau, the town has a total area of 3.9 square miles (10.0 km^{2}), of which 0.015 square miles (0.04 km^{2}), or 0.37%, is water.

== Demographics ==
Historical population
Census	Pop.	Note	%±
1980	488		—
1990	342		−29.9%
2000	1,016		197.1%
2010	1,186		16.7%
2020	1,192		0.5%
U.S. Decennial Census; 2013 Estimate

=== 2020 census ===
As of the 2020 census, Locust Fork had a population of 1,192. The median age was 43.8 years. 22.2% of residents were under the age of 18 and 18.2% were 65 years of age or older. For every 100 females, there were 91.6 males, and for every 100 females age 18 and over, there were 96.0 males age 18 and over.

0.0% of residents lived in urban areas, while 100.0% lived in rural areas.

There were 443 households, including 381 families. Of all households, 32.3% had children under the age of 18 living in them, 62.3% were married-couple households, 13.1% were households with a male householder and no spouse or partner present, and 20.8% were households with a female householder and no spouse or partner present. About 17.6% of all households were made up of individuals, and 9.3% had someone living alone who was 65 years of age or older.

There were 484 housing units, of which 8.5% were vacant. The homeowner vacancy rate was 1.3% and the rental vacancy rate was 13.5%.

Locust Fork racial composition
Race	Num.	Perc.
White (non-Hispanic)	1,092	91.61%
Black or African American (non-Hispanic)	10	0.84%
Native American	6	0.5%
Asian	5	0.42%
Other/Mixed	56	4.7%
Hispanic or Latino	23	1.93%

=== 2010 census ===
As of the census of 2010, there were 1,186 people, 435 households, and 342 families residing in the town. The population density was 119.1 people/km^{2} (308 people/mi^{2}). There were 469 housing units at an average density of 46.9 units/km^{2} (121 units/mi^{2}). The racial makeup of the town was 97.0% White, 0.8% Native American, 1.0% from other races, and 0.6% from two or more races. 2.4% of the population were Hispanic or Latino of any race.

There were 435 households, out of which 32.6% had children under the age of 18 living with them, 66.2% were married couples living together, 8.5% had a female householder with no husband present, and 21.4% were non-families. 17.9% of all households were made up of individuals, and 8.5% had someone living alone who was 65 years of age or older. The average household size was 2.73 and the average family size was 3.08.

In the town, the age distribution of the population shows 24.6% under the age of 18, 7.9% from 18 to 24, 24.0% from 25 to 44, 28.7% from 45 to 64, and 14.8% who were 65 years of age or older. The median age was 40.3 years. For every 100 females, there were 99.7 males. For every 100.8 females age 18 and over, there were 96.5 males.

The median income for a household in the town was $55,313, and the median income for a family was $59,167. Males had a median income of $41,776 versus $40,114 for females. The per capita income for the town was $21,356. About 9.2% of families and 11.4% of the population were below the poverty line, including 20.3% of those under age 18 and 14.1% of those age 65 or over.

== Transportation and growth ==
Locust Fork straddles Alabama State Route 79, which is a north–south highway running from Birmingham 31 miles (50 km) to the south and Scottsboro 65 miles (105 km) to the northeast. Blount County Road 13 runs northwestward to connect to Alabama Highway 160 between the communities of Hayden and Nectar. Blount County Road 15 intersects Alabama 79 just north of Locust Fork and provides a connection to the county seat of Oneonta, 14 miles (23 km) to the east. Also located along County Road 15 is the Limestone Springs Golf Course and residential development, 4 miles (6 km) southeast of town. The nearest interstate highways are Interstate 65 located some 15 miles (24 km) west of Locust Fork and Interstate 59 located some 25 miles (40 km) east of Locust Fork. Air travel is handled primarily from the Birmingham–Shuttlesworth International Airport located some 30 miles (48 km) southwest of Locust Fork. Locust Fork is located along one of the two major Alabama state highways that run northeast from Birmingham to the Sand Mountain area of Guntersville, Albertville, and Boaz. It is an alternate route from Birmingham to Huntsville and Chattanooga.

The Locust Fork area has and continues to see strong residential growth mainly due to outflow from Jefferson County as residents there seek a more rural environment as well as a lower tax structure. As a result of this growth, enrollment in schools has risen substantially. Also, traffic along the main Highway 79 artery has risen, and the road has become increasingly dangerous between the termination of a four-lane divided highway just north of Pinson and Locust Fork. There has been some discussion of upgrading the road to four-lane status, but such work is still considered several years away. Locust Fork will also be impacted by the eventual construction of the Northern Beltline, which is slated to cross Highway 79 just north of Pinson. This controlled-access highway (officially designated as Interstate 422) will provide much quicker access for Locust Fork residents traveling east to Trussville or westward to Gardendale, Graysville, and Tuscaloosa. However, this route is still 10–15 years away from completion.

== Government ==
Locust Fork is an incorporated town and has a mayor and town council elected by the citizens. The mayor and council are elected for four-year terms. The current mayor is Weslie Powell, and the current council members are Adam Youngblood (Mayor Pro-Tem), Sabrina Peeples, Barbara Richey, Joseph Lay and Joey White. The Community Center has been named after Sarah Holt, former Mayor and Council Person, serving the community for over 30 years.

== Schools ==
Locust Fork High School and Elementary School are located in the center of the town along the west side of Alabama Highway 79. The school nickname is Hornets with school colors of green and white. Locust Fork High School is currently classified as a 2A school under the AHSAA 7 tier classification system. There is a ratio of one teacher for every 20 students. The schools draw their students from a large portion of southern and southwestern Blount County. The schools are part of the Blount County School District. The high school football stadium is named Gary Pate Field in honor of a former Locust Fork football coach. The Lady Hornets Basketball Team won the 2016-2017 AHSAA 3A State Championship, the first State Championship of any kind for Locust Fork High School.

== Parks and municipal facilities ==
Locust Fork has a city park located on the west side of Alabama Highway 79 just south of the high school. The park includes a walking trail, playground for small children, picnic facilities, pavilion, barbecue pit, one baseball field, one T-ball field and one softball field. The Locust Fork Community Center is located just south of the park on Highway 79. Contact the Locust Fork Town Hall for more information regarding the Community Center. The Town Hall is open from 8-12 and 1–4, Monday through Thursday. The nearest golf courses are the highly acclaimed semi-private Limestone Springs (located just off Blount County Route 15 east of the town).

== Churches ==
There are several churches representing several denominations located in or near Locust Fork. The town has the largest Baptist church in the county.

== Infrastructure ==
The community is served by a volunteer fire department that provides fire suppression and Advanced Life Support Pre-hospital EMS Services and is patrolled by the Blount County Sheriff's Office. There is a dental office, pharmacy, medical clinic, veterinary clinic and general retail in Locust Fork.

== Media ==
Locust Fork is located in the Birmingham television and radio market. Newspapers include The Birmingham News and The Blount Countian.

== Notable person ==
- Chase Biles, UAB Football
- Gerald Swindle, professional bass angler
