= Alabama State Route 151 =

Highway in Alabama

State Route 151
- Tapawingo Road

Route information
- Maintained by ALDOT
- Length: 0.404 mi (650 m)
- Existed: 1993–present

Major junctions
- South end: SR 79 in Pinson
- North end: SR 75 in Pinson

Location
- Country: United States
- State: Alabama
- Counties: Jefferson

Highway system
- Alabama State Highway System; Interstate; US; State
← SR 150	→ SR 152

State Route 151 (SR 151) is a 0.404-mile-long (0.650 km) state highway in Pinson in the northeastern part of Jefferson County, in the central part of the U.S. state of Alabama. The southern terminus of the highway is at an intersection with SR 79. The northern terminus is at an intersection with SR 75. It is known as Tapawingo Road for its entire length. At its northern terminus, SR 75 takes on the Tapawingo Road name.

== Route description ==
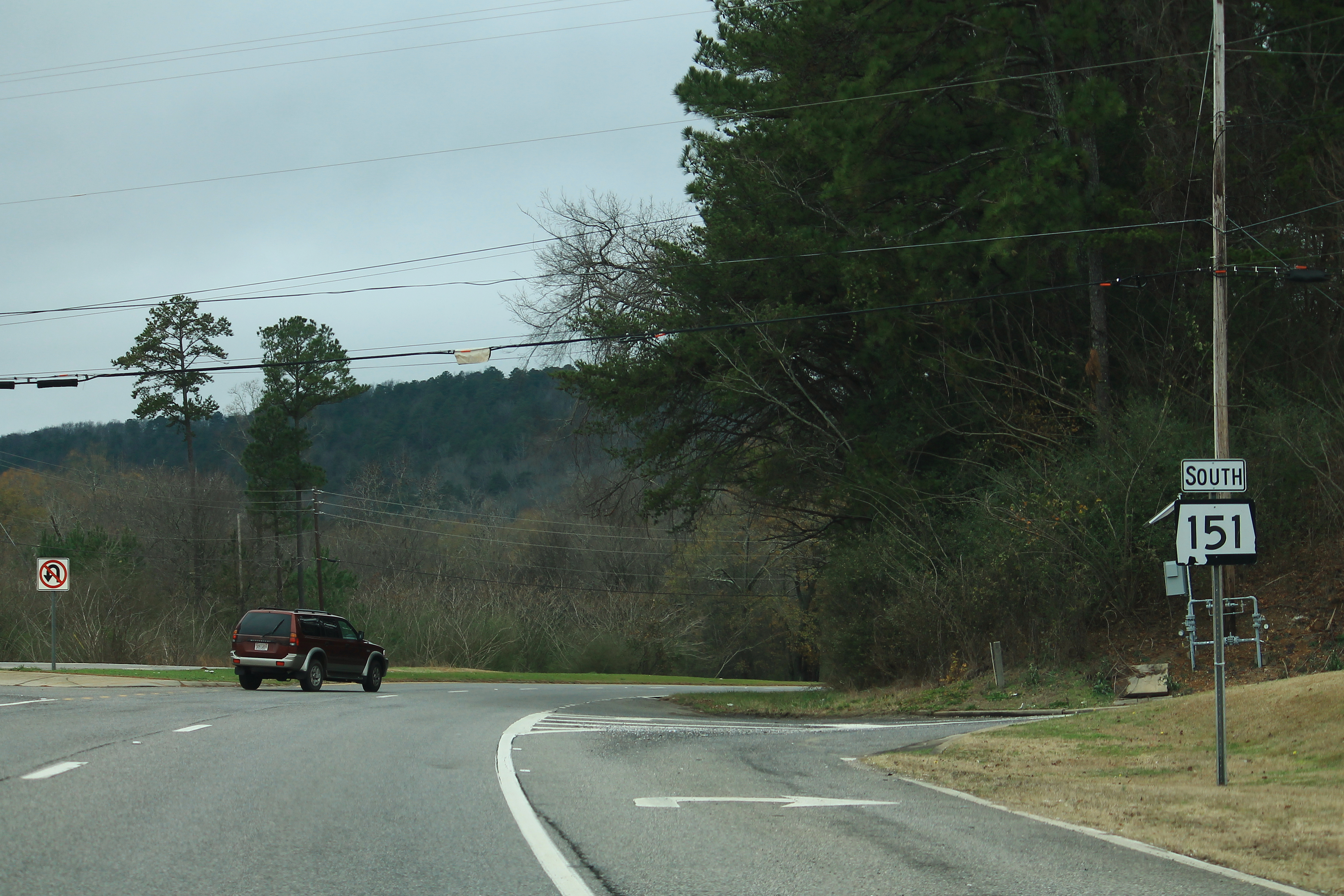
A sign for Alabama State Route 151, located within Pinson, Alabama.

SR 151 begins at an intersection with SR 79 (Pinson Valley Parkway/New Bradford Road) on the western edge of Pinson. Here, the roadway continues as Jefferson County Route 131 (CR 131; Narrows Road). SR 151 travels to the east-southeast and, almost immediately, crosses over Beaver Creek. It is aligned along a four-lane undivided highway along its entire length. It curves to the east-northeast and reaches its northern terminus, an intersection with SR 75 (Center Point Road/Tapawingo Road). Although it is signed as a south–north route, the orientation of the highway is actually east–west.

== History ==
Prior to its designation as SR 151 in 1993, the highway was signed as "TO SR 75" at its southern terminus and "TO SR 79" at its northern terminus.

== Major intersections ==
The entire route is in Pinson, Jefferson County.

mi	km	Destinations	Notes
0.000	0.000	SR 79 (Pinson Valley Parkway / New Bradford Road) / CR 131 west (Narrows Road) – Birmingham, Cleveland	Southern terminus
0.404	0.650	SR 75 (Center Point Road / Tapawingo Road) – Gardendale, Oneonta	Northern terminus; SR 75 north takes on the Tapawingo Road name.
1.000 mi = 1.609 km; 1.000 km = 0.621 mi
