= ZZN =

ZZN may refer to:

- Zozlan railway station, Pakistan Railways code
- Nationaltheatret station, Oslo, Norway, IATA code
- WZZN ("97.7 The Zone"), a radio station broadcasting to Huntsville, Alabama
