= Locust Fork High School =

Government high school in Alabama

Location
- 77 School Road; Locust Fork, Alabama 35097; 33°53′47″N 86°37′50″W

Information
- School type: Public high school
- Established: 1921
- School district: Blount County School District
- NCES District ID: 0100420
- Superintendent: Rodney Green
- NCES School ID: 010042000210
- Principal: Thomas Smitherman
- Grades: 7-12
- Enrollment: 415
- Student to teacher ratio: 22.02
- Colors: Green, White
- Athletics conference: AHSAA Division 3A
- Mascot: Hornet
- Website: locustforkhighhornets.com

The Locust Fork High School is a high school in Locust Fork, Alabama. Part of the Blount County School District in Blount County, Alabama, it is at 77 School Road. The hornet is the school mascot.

== Overview ==
As of 2024 six percent of the student body was Hispanic, four percent was African-American, and the overwhelming majority was White. The school principal is Thomas Smitherman.

The original school burned down in 1961, causing $250,000 in damage. The cause of the fire was never determined.

In 2017, the Lady Hornets basketball team won its first Alabama High School Athletic Association state title, with a 72-62 win over Pisgah at Legacy Arena inside the BJCC.

Dylan "Dino" Embry was a star athlete at the school.

In 2005, a teacher was placed on leave after being charged with second-degree rape. In 2018, a former teacher was convicted of sex crimes with students. In 2023, a former assistant principal was convicted of filming girls undressing and was ordered to pay US$4 million in restitution.

== Notable alumni ==
- Gerald Swindle, bass angler

== See also ==
- List of high schools in Alabama
- Locust Fork of the Black Warrior River
