= Susan Moore, Alabama =

- Town
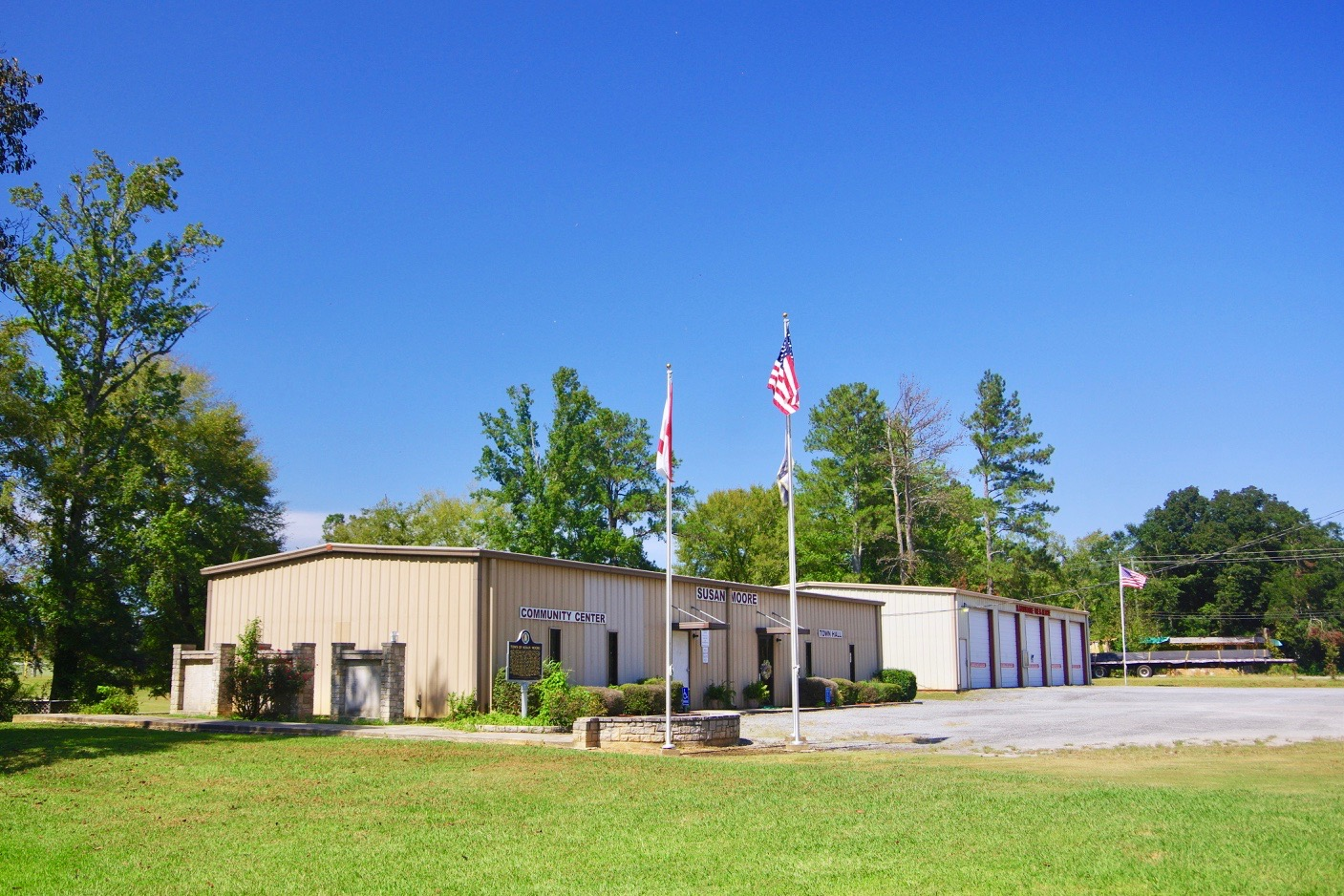
- Town Hall

- Location of Susan Moore in Blount County, Alabama.
- Coordinates: 34°04′49″N 86°24′09″W
- Country: United States
- State: Alabama
- County: Blount

Area
  - Total: 5.43 sq mi (14.06 km^{2})
  - Land: 5.41 sq mi (14.01 km^{2})
  - Water: 0.019 sq mi (0.05 km^{2})
- Elevation: 797 ft (243 m)

Population (2020)
  - Total: 787
  - Density: 145.5/sq mi (56.19/km^{2})
- Time zone: UTC-6 (Central (CST))
  - Summer (DST): UTC-5 (CDT)
- ZIP code: 35952
- Area codes: 205, 659
- FIPS code: 01-74160
- GNIS feature ID: 2406699
- Website: https://susanmooretownhall.com/

Susan Moore is a town in Blount County, Alabama, United States. At the 2020 census, the population was 787. It is one of two towns in Alabama to have the first and last name of an individual; the other is Phil Campbell.

== History ==
Initially known as "Clarence," what is now Susan Moore was settled by Robert M. Moore and his family in the mid-1860s. In 1923, two of Moore's grandsons donated land for a new school, which was named after their mother, Susan Moore, and the community gradually adopted this name. The town incorporated in 1982.

== Geography ==
Susan Moore is located in northeastern Blount County in the Sand Mountain region of Alabama. State Highway 75 passes through the center of the town, leading southwest 10 miles (16 km) to Oneonta, the county seat, and northeast 18 miles (29 km) to Albertville. The Locust Fork of the Black Warrior River flows through the northwest corner of the town.

According to the U.S. Census Bureau, the town has a total area of 5.3 square miles (13.6 km^{2}), of which 0.015 square miles (0.04 km^{2}), or 0.31%, is water.

== Education ==
Susan Moore High School is a public high school in Susan Moore. It serves grades 7 to 12. It has about 360 students and its student body is about 2/3 white and 1/3 Hispanic. It is part of the Blount County School District. The school and the town were named for the mom of the land donors who provided an initial site for the school. Bulldogs are the school mascot and purple and white the school colors.

The school was listed among accredited Alabama schools in 1929.

Baseball player Eddie Priest is an alum.

A teacher at the school was convicted for sexting a 15 year-old student at the school in 2014.

== Demographics ==
Historical population
Census	Pop.	Note	%±
1990	658		—
2000	721		9.6%
2010	763		5.8%
2020	787		3.1%
U.S. Decennial Census

=== 2020 census ===
Susan Moore racial composition
Race	Num.	Perc.
White (non-Hispanic)	615	78.14%
Black or African American (non-Hispanic)	6	0.76%
Native American	3	0.38%
Other/Mixed	23	2.92%
Hispanic or Latino	140	17.79%

As of the 2020 United States census, there were 787 people, 317 households, and 232 families residing in the town.

=== 2000 census ===
As of the census of 2000, there were 721 people, 268 households, and 210 families residing in the town. The population density was 137.6 inhabitants per square mile (53.1/km^{2}). There were 304 housing units at an average density of 58.0 per square mile (22.4/km^{2}). The racial makeup of the town was 93.48% White, 0.14% Black or African American, 0.83% Native American, 0.14% Asian, 5.41% from other races. 5.96% of the population were Hispanic or Latino of any race.

There were 268 households, out of which 36.9% had children under the age of 18 living with them, 68.3% were married couples living together, 6.7% had a female householder with no husband present, and 21.3% were non-families. 19.8% of all households were made up of individuals, and 11.6% had someone living alone who was 65 years of age or older. The average household size was 2.69 and the average family size was 3.07.

In the town, the age distribution of the population shows 26.2% under the age of 18, 10.1% from 18 to 24, 28.8% from 25 to 44, 23.0% from 45 to 64, and 11.8% who were 65 years of age or older. The median age was 34 years. For every 100 females, there were 93.3 males. For every 100 females age 18 and over, there were 90.7 males.

The median income for a household in the town was $35,417, and the median income for a family was $44,167. Males had a median income of $32,431 versus $19,688 for females. The per capita income for the town was $14,540. About 10.3% of families and 10.9% of the population were below the poverty line, including 7.8% of those under age 18 and 28.9% of those age 65 or over.
