= Brooksville, Blount County, Alabama =

Unincorporated community in Alabama, United States

Brooksville, Alabama
- Unincorporated community
- Location within Alabama Location within the United States
- Coordinates: 34°09′43″N 86°28′32″W
- Country: United States
- State: Alabama
- County: Blount
- Elevation: 801 ft (244 m)
- Time zone: UTC-6 (Central (CST))
  - Summer (DST): UTC-5 (CDT)
- Area codes: 205, 659
- GNIS feature ID: 114969

Brooksville is an unincorporated community in Blount County, Alabama, United States, located at the junction of U.S. Route 278, Alabama State Route 74, and Alabama State Route 79, 8.7 miles (14.0 km) northeast of Blountsville.

Brooksville is named for Henry Brooks, who settled in the area in 1836.
