= Locust Fork =

Locust Fork may refer to:

- Locust Fork, Alabama
- Locust Fork of the Black Warrior River
- Locust Fork (band)
