= List of future Interstate Highways =

Dwight D. Eisenhower National System of Interstate and Defense Highways
- Highway shields for Future Interstates

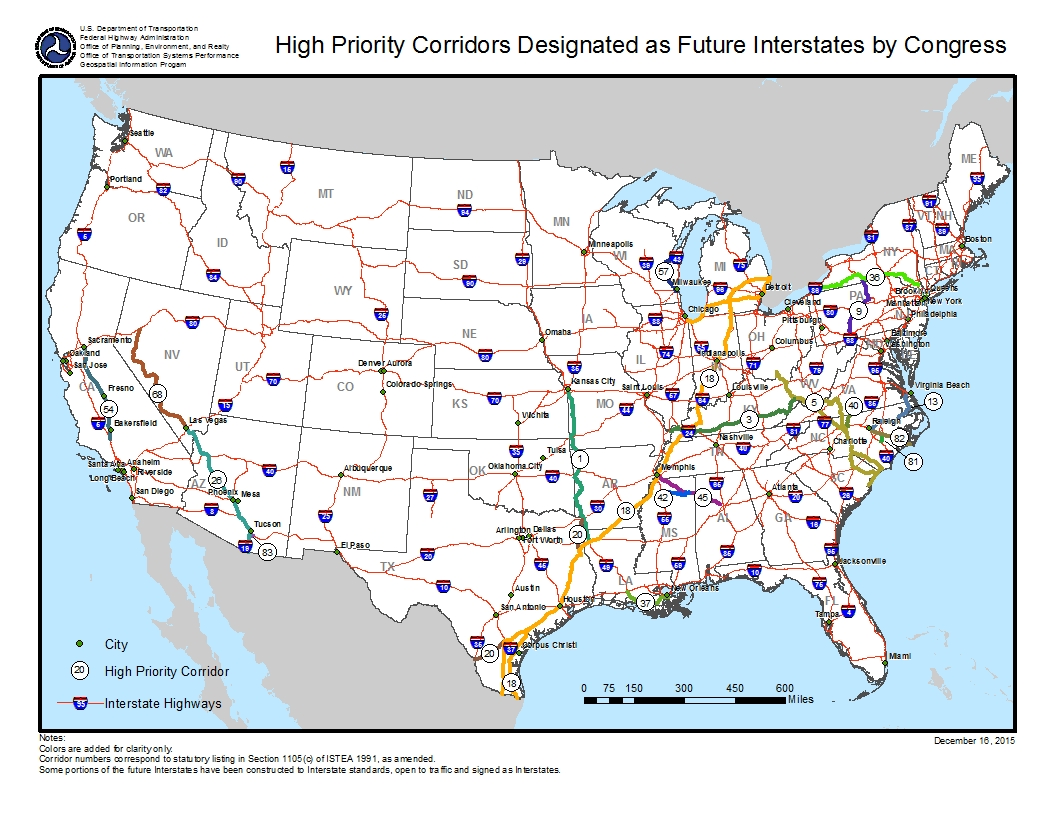
- Proposed Interstate Highways in December 2015

System information
- Formed: June 29, 1956

Highway names
- Interstates: Interstate X (I-X)

System links
- Interstate Highway System; Main; Auxiliary; Suffixed; Business; Future

In the United States, future Interstate Highways include proposals to establish new mainline (one- and two-digit) routes to the Interstate Highway System. Included in this article are auxiliary Interstate Highways, designated by three-digit numbers, in varying stages of planning and construction, and the planned expansion of existing primary Interstate Highways.

== Congressionally designated future Interstates ==
Several Congressional High Priority Corridors have been designated as future parts of the Interstate Highway System by the Intermodal Surface Transportation Efficiency Act (ISTEA) in 1991 and amendments to Section 1105. By law, they will become interstates when built to Interstate standards and connected to other interstates.

=== Interstate 7 or 9 ===
Future Interstate 7 or 9
- Location: Wheeler Ridge–Sacramento, California
- Length: 302 mi (486 km)

State Route 99 has been designated as a future Interstate Highway corridor between Wheeler Ridge and Sacramento. The route would be designated as I-7 or I-9, remaining in line with the national numbering system. Differing proposals show the route ending in Stockton or Sacramento. Designation is contingent upon completion of the "Route 99 Corridor Enhancement Master Plan". Although scattered improvement projects have been completed, there is currently no timeline or funding for the completion of the plan.

== Future Auxiliary Interstate Highways ==
=== Interstate 195 (Washington D.C.) ===
Future Interstate 195
- Location: Washington
- Length: 2.41 mi (3.88 km)

The current Interstate 695 will be eliminated and be replaced with an extension of Interstate 395. The original Interstate 395 through the 3rd Street Tunnel will be renumbered as Interstate 195.

=== Interstate 214 ===
Future Interstate 214
- Location: Bryan–College Station

Interstate 214 is proposed to be a beltway around Bryan-College Station in Texas.

=== Interstate 222 ===
Future Interstate 222
- Location: Graysville to Brookside
- Length: 2.26 mi (3.64 km)

Interstate 222 is a future auxiliary Interstate Highway that will be a connector between I-22 and the proposed I-422 near Birmingham, Alabama. There will be no exits other than its termini. The highway has been proposed because an interchange directly between I-22 and I-422 cannot be built due to environmental issues.

=== Interstate 274 (North Carolina) ===
Future Interstate 274
- Location: Winston-Salem
- Length: 16.83 mi (27.09 km)

Interstate 274 is the future designation for the western half of the beltway, currently designated as NC 452. When completed, it will connect US 158, near Clemmons, North Carolina, to Future I-74/Future I-285/US 52, in Bethania. I-274 first appeared on North Carolina Department of Transportation (NCDOT) planning maps in the early 2000s but was later disused for over a decade since. In May 2019, the American Association of State Highway and Transportation Officials (AASHTO) approved a request to establish Future I-274. Justification given by NCDOT was that the 16.83-mile (27.09 km) section would satisfy a great need to alleviate congestion in Winston-Salem, and connect the western portion of the urbanized area.

=== Interstate 343 ===
Future Interstate 343
- Location: Broken Arrow To Webbers Falls
- Length: 53.1 mi (85.5 km)

Interstate 343 is a proposed designation for the existing Muskogee Turnpike. The current designated number is Oklahoma State Highway 351.

=== Interstate 365 ===
Future Interstate 365
- Location: Park City to Somerset
- Length: 88.376 mi (142.227 km)

Interstate 365 is a proposed redesignation of the Cumberland Expressway once it is upgraded to Interstate standards. In August 2021, Congress released a new infrastructure bill that proposed to designate the whole length of the Cumberland Expressway as a Future Interstate, with the designation of I-365. The designation would need approval from AASHTO, the FHWA, and upgrades of several interchanges and other improvements before the designation could be implemented.

=== Interstate 369 (Kentucky) ===
Future Interstate 369
- Location: Henderson to Owensboro
- Length: 24.441 mi (39.334 km)

Interstate 369 is planned to follow the entire Audubon Parkway. The western terminus to Interstate 69 will be called the Interstate 69 Spur.

=== Interstate 422 ===
Future Interstate 422
- Location: south of Bessemer to Argo
- Length: 52.5 mi (84.5 km)

Interstate 422 is a proposed beltway in Birmingham. Interstate 422 will not directly connect to I-22 so therefore a new connector known as Interstate 222 is proposed. It is also called Corridor X-1. The first segment opened in September 2026 as State Route 959.

=== Interstate 569 ===
Future Interstate 569
- Location: Nortonville to Beaver Dam
- Length: 38.446 mi (61.873 km)

In April 2019, the Western Kentucky Parkway was proposed as Interstate 369. In December 2019, it was changed to Interstate 569, as the Audubon Parkway was proposed to be Interstate 369.

=== Interstate 644 ===
Future Interstate 644
- Location: Sapulpa To Fair Oaks
- Length: 33.22 mi (53.46 km)

Interstate 644 is a proposed designation for the existing Creek Turnpike.

=== Interstate 685 (Alabama) ===
Future Interstate 685
- Location: Montgomery
- Length: 14.440 mi (23.239 km)

Interstate 685 is planned to follow a portion of Interstate 85 when I-85 gets rerouted to the Montgomery Outer Loop.

=== Interstate 685 (North Carolina) ===
Future Interstate 685
- Location: Greensboro to Dunn
- Length: 89.200 mi (143.553 km)

Interstate 685 is a proposed Interstate planned to run along current US 421. It will be upgraded to Interstate highway standards from Interstate 40 in Greensboro to Interstate 95 in Dunn.

=== Interstate 795 (Florida) ===
Future Interstate 795
- Location: St. Johns to Jacksonville
- Length: 5.508 mi (8.864 km)

Florida State Road 9B is planned to be redesignated Interstate 795 (I-795) when the designation is approved by the Federal Highway Administration (FHWA) and the American Association of State Highway and Transportation Officials (AASHTO).

=== Interstate 905 ===
Future Interstate 905
- Location: San Diego to Otay Mesa
- Length: 8.964 mi (14.426 km)

Interstate 905 in California is proposed to replace California State Route 905, which connects San Diego to the Mexican border.
