= Kevin Sherrer =

American football player and coach (born 1973)

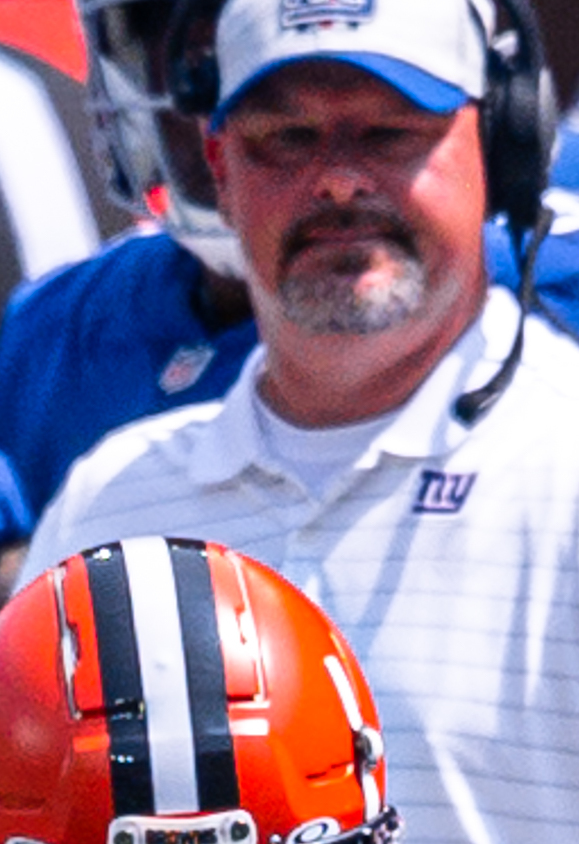
- Sherrer in 2021

LSU Tigers
- Title: Defensive assistant or analyst

Personal information
- Born: March 19, 1973 (age 53); Oneonta, Alabama, U.S.

Career information
- College: Alabama (1993–1995)

Career history
- Tuscaloosa County HS (1996–1997) Assistant coach; Alabama (1998–2000) Graduate assistant; Spain Park HS (2001–2004) Defensive backs coach; Hoover HS (2005–2006) Assistant coach; Hoover HS (2007–2009) Defensive coordinator; Alabama (2010–2012) (Director of player development); South Alabama (2013) Defensive coordinator & defensive backs coach; Georgia (2014–2017) Outside linebackers coach; Tennessee (2018) Defensive coordinator; Tennessee (2019) Special teams coordinator & inside linebackers coach; New York Giants (2020) Inside linebackers coach; New York Giants (2021) Linebackers coach; Georgia Tech (2023) Co-defensive coordinator & linebackers coach; Georgia State (2024) Defensive coordinator; Birmingham Stallions (2026) Defensive coordinator; LSU (2026-present)

Awards and highlights
- 2× National champion (2011, 2012)

Kevin Sherrer (born March 19, 1973) is an American football coach and former player. He most recently served as the defensive coordinator for Georgia State University. Before that was the co-defensive coordinator and linebackers coach for the Georgia Tech Yellow Jackets. He also previously served as the defensive coordinator at the University of Tennessee (2018–2019), the outside linebackers coach at Georgia (2014–2017), the defensive coordinator at South Alabama (2013), the Director of Player Development at Alabama (2010–2012), and as a high school assistant coach at Hoover High School, Spain Park High School, and Tuscaloosa County. He played college football at Alabama.

== Playing career ==
A native of Oneonta, Alabama, Sherrer played tight end and linebacker at Cleveland High School in nearby Cleveland. He was named All-State in 1990. Sherrer played tight end at Alabama from 1993 to 1995, lettering in the latter year. He graduated with a degree in physical education in 1996, and earned his master's degree in higher education administration from Alabama in 2000.

== Coaching career ==
=== Tuscaloosa County High School ===
Sherrer began coaching as an assistant at Tuscaloosa County High School in 1996, and helped the team win the state championship during his second year on the staff in 1997.

=== Alabama ===
In 1998, he returned to the University of Alabama, serving as a graduate assistant on the staff of head coach Mike DuBose. During his tenure as a GA with the Tide, he assisted with defense, scout teams, and recruiting.

=== Spain Park High School ===
From 2001 to 2004, Sherrer served as defensive backs coach at Spain Park High School in Hoover, Alabama. During his four years with Spain Park, the team steadily improved, finishing with a 9–4 record and reaching the state quarterfinals in 2004.

=== Hoover High School ===
In 2005, Sherrer joined the staff at Hoover High School, reuniting with college teammate (and future collegiate coaching colleague) Jeremy Pruitt. He initially served as an assistant with Hoover before taking over as defensive coordinator in 2007 following Pruitt's departure.

=== Return to Alabama ===
Sherrer served as Director of Player Development at Alabama under Nick Saban from 2010 to 2012. During this time he won two national championships with the Crimson Tide.

=== South Alabama ===
In 2013, he was hired as the defensive coordinator and defensive backs coach at South Alabama. During his lone season with the Jaguars, the team finished second in the Sun Belt Conference in total defense (384 yards per game) and scoring defense (25 points per game).

=== Georgia ===
In 2014, Sherrer joined Mark Richt's staff at Georgia, and remained on staff as the outside linebackers coach after Richt was replaced by Kirby Smart following the 2015 season. Players Sherrer coached at Georgia included Tae Crowder, Leonard Floyd, and Jordan Jenkins.

=== Tennessee ===
In December 2017, Sherrer was hired as the defensive coordinator at Tennessee, where his long-time colleague Pruitt had been named head coach. In Sherrer’s second season on Jeremy Pruitt’s staff. Sherrer served as the team’s special teams coordinator in addition to being the teams inside linebackers coach after spending his first season as co-defensive coordinator and inside linebackers coach.

=== New York Giants ===
On January 25, 2020, it was announced that Sherrer would become the inside linebackers coach for the New York Giants. Sherrer assumed outside linebackers coach duties with the team after Bret Bielema left to become the head coach for Illinois on December 19, 2020. It was announced prior to the 2021 season that he would continue to coach the entire linebacking core. He was let go after the 2021 season.

=== Georgia Tech ===
On January 4, 2023, it was announced that Sherrer was hired to be the linebackers coach and co-defensive coordinator for Georgia Tech under head coach Brent Key. On October 1, 2023, Sherrer was promoted to defensive coordinator by Brent Key.

== Family ==
Sherrer and his wife, Carrie, have twin sons, Kaleb and Kyle.

While coaching at Georgia in 2015, his sister Rasha was found murdered.
