= Bettye Kimbrell =

American quilter (1936–2016)

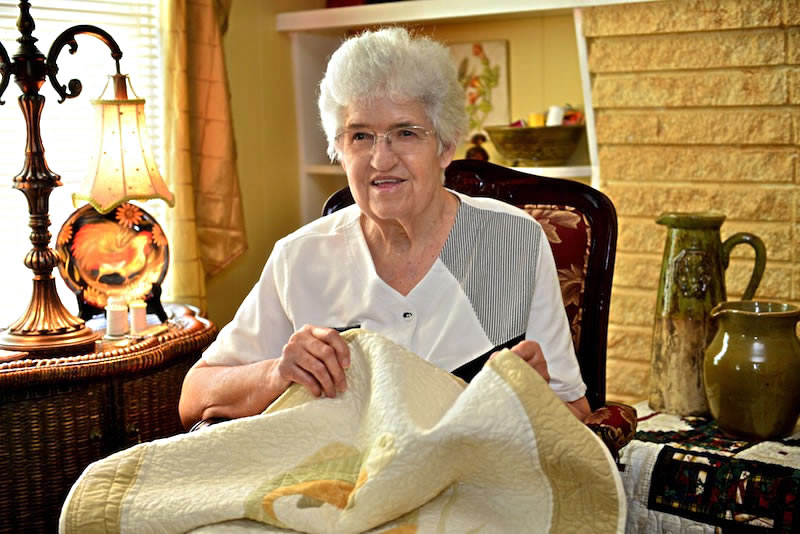
- Kimbrell in 2008
- Born: November 22, 1936; Berry, Alabama, U.S.
- Died: October 18, 2016 (aged 79)
- Occupations: Folk art, quilting
- Awards: Alabama Folk Heritage Award (1995); NEA's National Heritage Fellowship (2008)

Bettye Jean Whitson Kimbrell (November 22, 1936 – October 18, 2016) was a master folk artist for quilting, and one of the charter members of the North Jefferson Quilter's Guild in Mount Olive, Alabama.

In 1995, Kimbrell won the Alabama Folk Heritage Award, the highest honor for the traditional arts in Alabama. Kimbrell received national attention in 2008 when she was one of eleven folk artists to receive the National Heritage Fellowship from the National Endowment for the Arts, the highest honor in the folk and traditional arts in the United States. Her quilts have been exhibited at the Birmingham Museum of Art (2008), have toured five cities in Belgium in the "Schatten van/in Mensen" exhibit (2010–11), and were displayed in five cities in China as part of an exhibit sponsored by the United States Embassy (2012–2013).

== Art ==
Kimbrell was known for her intricate needlework and detailed quilting. She used traditional techniques such as trapunto, broderie perse, and leaf pounding in her work and created her own designs along with traditional patterns.

== Biography ==
Kimbrell grew up with her father and grandparents on a cotton farm in Berry, Fayette County, Alabama. She was the oldest of five children. Her grandmother taught her to quilt when she was 10 because she believed "idle hands are the devil's workshop". They made string quilts using scraps of square fabric for the top, feed and fertilizer sacks for the back, and cotton from their farm for the batting, with string ties every few inches to hold them together.

She met Calvin Kimbrell when she was 13, and they were married shortly after. The couple moved to Birmingham in 1954, then to Mount Olive, Alabama. In the 1960s, a friend gave her name to Loveman's Department Store in Birmingham for directing customers to get their quilts finished. Finishing all different types and designs of quilts got Kimbrell interested in quilting as an art and not just as a utilitarian need.

In the early 1970s, Kimbrell won her first blue ribbon for quilting and describes this event as the "spark that lit the fire". Before this time she had been raising five children and taking care of her youngest sister, who had polio, and she did not have time to devote to quilting as a hobby. In 1979, Kimbrell organized a quilt show for the Mount Olive community center, and out of this event came the North Jefferson Quilter's Guild.

Kimbrell was an active member of Quilt Alabama, and a master folk artist for the Alabama Folk Council for the Arts' folk arts apprenticeship program. She was also a featured artist at the Alabama Folklife Festival, the Alabama Sampler portion of the Birmingham festival, City Stages, and the Kentuck Festival in Northport, Alabama. Kimbrell taught quilting classes at the John C. Campbell Folk School in Brasstown, North Carolina, and at the Alabama Folk School at Camp McDowell in Nauvoo, Alabama. When not working on her own quilts, Kimbrell restored old quilts.

Kimbrell died on October 18, 2016 after a series of strokes. At the time of her death, she was 79 and had been living in Mount Olive, Alabama.

== See also ==
- List of quilters
- List of North American pieced quilt patterns
