= WZZN =

- Union Grove, Alabama; United States
- Broadcast area: Huntsville, Alabama
- Frequency: 97.7 MHz
- Branding: 97.7 ESPN The Zone

Programming
- Format: Sports radio
- Affiliations: ESPN Radio

Ownership
- Owner: Neighbors Broadcast Company, LLC

History
- First air date: July 12, 1968; 57 years ago
- Former call signs: WKLD-FM (1968–1981); WKLD (1981–2009)
- Call sign meaning: ZZN = "Zone"

Technical information
- Licensing authority: FCC
- Facility ID: 5885
- Class: A
- ERP: 950 watts
- HAAT: 251 meters (823 ft)
- Transmitter coordinates: 34°26′39″N 86°32′05″W

Links
- Public license information: Public file; LMS
- Webcast: Listen live
- Website: 977espn.com

WZZN (97.7 MHz, "97.7 The Zone") is a commercial FM radio station licensed to Union Grove, Alabama, and serving the Huntsville media market. The station is owned by Neighbors Broadcast Company, LLC, and airs a sports radio format, affiliated with the ESPN Radio Network.

WZZN studios and offices are on Woodson Street in Huntsville. The transmitter is off Allens Cross Road in Union Grove.

== Programming ==
WZZN carries a mix of local sports programs and nationally syndicated shows from the ESPN Radio Network. Afternoon host Paul Finebaum is carried from studios in Charlotte, North Carolina, a program that is syndicated around the South. Program Director Steve Moulton was named the "Large Market Sportscaster of the Year" by the Alabama Broadcasters Association six times in 2011, 2013, 2014, 2016, 2017 &2018. On-air personalities include former University of Alabama Football player Wes Neighbors, plus Drew DeArmond, co-host of "Talkin Ball," heard weekday mornings, 7-9 am, along with Scott Theisen. Play-by-play broadcasts on the station include the Crimson Tide Sports Network, Atlanta Braves Baseball, Madison Academy football (on Friday nights during the season), Army Black Knights football, the Huntsville Times Classic (a local high school basketball tournament), UAH Chargers basketball, Huntsville Havoc home games, plus coverage of Auburn University and University of Alabama sports. Thom Abraham is on the air as well

== History ==
=== Ownership ===
On July 12, 1968, the station first signed on as WKLD-FM in Oneonta, Alabama. It was simulcast with co-owned AM 1570 WCRL. Because the AM station was a daytime only station, the FM carried the AM programming around the clock. The "LD" in the original WKLD call letters stood for the station's founder, former owner and on-air host, Luther Daniel "L.D." Bentley. For the first few decades of its existence, the station was a multi-format station featuring a wide-ranging selection of music, talk and entertainment programs. In November 2002, control of Blount County Broadcasting Service legally passed from Luther Daniel Bentley Jr. to Luther Daniel Bentley III.

In April 2008, Blount County Broadcasting Service, Inc., reached an agreement to sell this station to Great South Wireless LLC for a reported sale price of $1.1 million. The deal was approved by the FCC on June 10, 2008, and the transaction was consummated on September 16, 2008. At the time of the sale, WKLD broadcast a country music format branded as "K97.7".

To serve the larger Huntsville media market, in 2008, the station received Federal Communications Commission (FCC) permission to move to its Union Grove site in December 2009. In 2009, the station switched its call sign to WZZN, and began an all-sports format branded as "97.7 The Zone" in July 2010.

Effective July 26, 2019, Great South Wireless sold WZZN to Neighbors Broadcast Company, LLC for $535,000.

=== Former on-air staff ===
SiriusXM (Crime Stories with Nancy Grace) news anchor John Lemley began his radio career at WKLD at the age of 16. For a brief time in 1984, he hosted the afternoon drive time (adult contemporary) music program.

One of the most popular WKLD programs was its early morning talk and music program Early Riser hosted by the brother and sister team of Danny Bentley and Terri (Bentley) Lowry. After the sale, they moved to former sister station WCRL.

== Relocation ==
On August 4, 2008, WKLD received an FCC construction permit to move the station's broadcast tower to a new city of license location of Union Grove, Alabama. The move means the station's signal can be heard around the Huntsville metropolitan area. The last song played on WKLD was reportedly "When Will I See You Again" by The Three Degrees.

The station was assigned the new call sign WZZN by the FCC on August 27, 2009.

WZZN began licensed operation with Union Grove as the city of license on December 24, 2009. Four days later, the station applied for a new special temporary authority to remain silent for technical reasons, citing their inability to "maintain an adequate studio/transmitter link". This authority was granted by the FCC on March 22, 2010, with a scheduled September 19, 2010, expiration. The station returned to the air in July 2010 with a sports talk format.
