= Alabama State Route 152 =

State highway in Alabama, United States

State Route 152
- Northern Boulevard

Route information
- Maintained by ALDOT
- Length: 6.605 mi (10.630 km)
- Existed: 1981–present

Major junctions
- West end: I-65 / US 82 north of Montgomery
- East end: US 231 / SR 9 / SR 21 in Montgomery

Location
- Country: United States
- State: Alabama
- Counties: Montgomery

Highway system
- Alabama State Highway System; Interstate; US; State
← SR 151	→ SR 153

State Route 152 (SR 152) is a 6.605-mile-long (10.630 km) state highway along the north and northeast sides of Montgomery in the central part of the U.S. state of Alabama. The western terminus of the highway is at an interchange with I-65/US 82 near the Alabama River north of the city. The eastern terminus of the highway is at an interchange with US 231/SR 21 northeast of the city.

== Route description ==
SR 152 begins at an interchange with I-65/US 82 (internally designated as SR 6) just north of Montgomery. It travels to the northeast. Almost immediately, it crosses over the Alabama River. Right after the river, the highway enters the city limits of Montgomery and has an interchange with Louisville Street. It then travels on a bridge over some railroad tracks of CSX, Chandler Street, and Race Street. Upon curving to the north-northeast, SR 152 has an interchange with 6th Street, which leads to the Alabama State Docks. The highway curves back to the northeast and has an at-grade intersection with Jackson Ferry Road. It curves to the east and has an interchange with Lower Wetumpka Road. The highway curves to the east-southeast, crosses over some railroad tracks of CSX, and skirts along the northern edge of the Montgomery Zoo. It then intersects the northern terminus of Coliseum Parkway, which provides access to the zoo from SR 152. It then intersects Coliseum Boulevard, which leads to the Marine Corps Reserve Center and the Alabama Department of Transportation's Central Office Complex and 6th Division Office. An intersection with Emory Folmar Boulevard leads to the Montgomery Industrial Park. The next intersection, with North Belt Drive, leads to the Montgomery Motorsports Park. Contractor Drive leads to the Alabama National Guard's headquarters. SR 152 then has an interchange with US 231/SR 21 (Eastern Boulevard/Wetumpka Highway). They lead to Maxwell Air Force Base's Gunter Annex and Fort Toulouse.

== Major intersections ==
The entire route is in Montgomery County.

Location	mi	km	Destinations	Notes
	0.00	0.00	I-65 / US 82 (SR 6) – Montgomery, Mobile, Birmingham	Western terminus; I-65/US 82 exit 173; US 82 is not signed on SR 152.
Montgomery	0.59	0.95	Louisville Street	Interchange
Montgomery	1.29	2.08	6th Street – Alabama State Docks	Interchange
Montgomery	3.38	5.44	Lower Wetumpka Road	Interchange
Montgomery	6.61	10.64	US 231 (SR 53) / SR 21 (Eastern Boulevard / Wetumpka Highway) – Wetumpka, Troy	Eastern terminus; interchange
1.000 mi = 1.609 km; 1.000 km = 0.621 mi
