= Mount Olive, Jefferson County, Alabama =

Unincorporated community in Alabama, United States

Mount Olive, Alabama
- Census-designated place (CDP) & Unincorporated community
- Location in Jefferson County and the state of Alabama
- Coordinates: 33°40′37″N 86°52′48″W
- Country: United States
- State: Alabama
- County: Jefferson

Area
  - Total: 9.30 sq mi (24.09 km^{2})
  - Land: 9.30 sq mi (24.08 km^{2})
  - Water: 0.0039 sq mi (0.01 km^{2})
- Elevation: 620 ft (190 m)

Population (2020)
  - Total: 4,427
  - Density: 476.2/sq mi (183.85/km^{2})
- Time zone: UTC-6 (Central (CST))
  - Summer (DST): UTC-5 (CDT)
- ZIP code: 35117
- Area codes: 205, 659
- FIPS code: 01-52344
- GNIS feature ID: 2403310

Mount Olive, also spelled Mt. Olive is an unincorporated community and a census-designated place (CDP) in Jefferson County, Alabama. Its location is in the suburbs of Birmingham. As of the 2010 census, the population of the community is 4,079. Mount Olive is bordered on the south and the east by the city of Gardendale, and in fact, some areas that had previously been in Mount Olive have been annexed into Gardendale over the years. Running along part of the border between Mt. Olive and Gardendale is the major expressway, Interstate 65. Eventually, part of Birmingham's Northern Beltline will cut through northwestern sections of Mt. Olive. Mt. Olive has its own elementary school, and was formerly the home of a junior high school.

== Geography ==
According to the U.S. Census Bureau, the community has a total area of 9.3 square miles (24.1 km^{2}), all land.

== Demographics ==
Historical population
Census	Pop.	Note	%±
2000	3,957		—
2010	4,079		3.1%
2020	4,427		8.5%
U.S. Decennial Census

Mount Olive first appeared as a census designated place in the 2000 U.S. Census.

=== 2020 census ===
Mount Olive CDP, Jefferson County, Alabama – Racial and ethnic composition Note: the US Census treats Hispanic/Latino as an ethnic category. This table excludes Latinos from the racial categories and assigns them to a separate category. Hispanics/Latinos may be of any race.
Race / Ethnicity (NH = Non-Hispanic)	Pop 2000	Pop 2010	Pop 2020	% 2000	% 2010	% 2020
White alone (NH)	3,853	3,974	4,029	97.37%	97.43%	91.01%
Black or African American alone (NH)	2	41	117	0.05%	1.01%	2.64%
Native American or Alaska Native alone (NH)	12	9	12	0.30%	0.22%	0.27%
Asian alone (NH)	2	11	19	0.05%	0.27%	0.43%
Native Hawaiian or Pacific Islander alone (NH)	0	1	1	0.00%	0.02%	0.02%
Other race alone (NH)	0	1	4	0.00%	0.02%	0.09%
Mixed race or Multiracial (NH)	57	20	162	1.44%	0.49%	3.66%
Hispanic or Latino (any race)	31	22	83	0.78%	0.54%	1.87%
Total	3,957	4,079	4,427	100.00%	100.00%	100.00%

As of the 2020 United States census, there were 4,427 people, 1,620 households, and 1,280 families residing in the CDP.

=== 2010 census ===
At the 2010 census there were 4,079 people, 1,551 households, and 1,217 families residing in the community. The population density was 440 inhabitants per square mile (170/km^{2}). There were 1,631 housing units at an average density of 175.4 per square mile (67.7/km^{2}). The racial makeup of the community was 97.7% White, 1.0% Black or African American, 0.2% Native American, 0.3% Asian, and .5% from two or more races. 0.5% of the population were Hispanic or Latino of any race. Of the 1,551 households 30.4% had children under the age of 18 living with them, 66.9% were married couples living together, 8.5% had a female householder with no husband present, and 21.5% were non-families. 19.2% of households were one person and 8.5% were one person aged 65 or older. The average household size was 2.63 and the average family size was 3.01.

The age distribution was 22.5% under the age of 18, 7.4% from 18 to 24, 24.6% from 25 to 44, 30.0% from 45 to 64, and 15.5% 65 or older. The median age was 41.7 years. For every 100 females, there were 95.3 males. For every 100 females age 18 and over, there were 98.6 males.

The median household income was $63,942 and the median family income was $81,477. Males had a median income of $51,035 versus $34,426 for females. The per capita income for the community was $28,151. About 4.5% of families and 6.2% of the population were below the poverty line, including 8.5% of those under age 18 and 0.0% of those age 65 or over.

=== 2000 census ===
At the 2000 census there were 3,957 people, 1,499 households, and 1,221 families residing in the community. The population density was 417.6 inhabitants per square mile (161.2/km^{2}). There were 1,553 housing units at an average density of 163.9 per square mile (63.3/km^{2}). The racial makeup of the community was 98.10% White, 0.08% Black or African American, 0.33% Native American, 0.05% Asian, and 1.44% from two or more races. 0.78% of the population were Hispanic or Latino of any race. Of the 1,499 households 34.8% had children under the age of 18 living with them, 72.1% were married couples living together, 6.8% had a female householder with no husband present, and 18.5% were non-families. 16.6% of households were one person and 7.7% were one person aged 65 or older. The average household size was 2.63 and the average family size was 2.95.

The age distribution was 23.5% under the age of 18, 6.5% from 18 to 24, 31.0% from 25 to 44, 25.3% from 45 to 64, and 13.6% 65 or older. The median age was 39 years. For every 100 females, there were 98.3 males. For every 100 females age 18 and over, there were 94.6 males.

The median household income was $48,291 and the median family income was $52,425. Males had a median income of $41,250 versus $27,021 for females. The per capita income for the community was $21,311. About 4.0% of families and 4.6% of the population were below the poverty line, including 1.8% of those under age 18 and 9.0% of those age 65 or over.

== Notable people ==
- Bettye Kimbrell (1936–2016), quilter
