= WCRL =

- Oneonta, Alabama; United States
- Frequency: 1570 kHz
- Branding: WCRL 95.3/94.7 FM

Programming
- Format: Classic hits
- Affiliations: Fox News Radio

Ownership
- Owner: Our Town Radio, Inc.

History
- First air date: 1952

Technical information
- Licensing authority: FCC
- Facility ID: 5888
- Class: D
- Power: 2,500 watts day 64 watts night
- Transmitter coordinates: 33°57′16″N 86°28′20″W
- Translators: 94.7 W234DI (Douglas); 95.3 W237DH (Oneonta)

Links
- Public license information: Public file; LMS
- Webcast: Listen Live
- Website: wcrlradio.com

WCRL (1570 AM) is a radio station licensed to serve Oneonta, Alabama. The station is owned by Our Town Radio, Inc. and began operation on July 29, 1952. WCRL airs a classic hits music format.

== History ==
The station was assigned the WCRL call sign by the Federal Communications Commission. The station has been owned by the L.D. Bentley Jr. family since the early 1950s, through Blount County Broadcasting Service, Inc. In 1968 the station added an FM sister, WKLD. That station was sold to Great South Wireless LLC in a deal that was completed in September 2008.

In November 2002, control of Blount County Broadcasting Service legally passed from Luther Daniel Bentley Jr. to Luther Daniel Bentley III. The younger Bentley and his sister, Teresa B. Lowry, now respectively own 51% and 49% of the corporation.

On March 30, 2012, Blount County Broadcasting Service, Inc., reached a deal to sell WCRL and its translator, W237DH, to Our Town Radio, Inc., for $180,000. The FCC approved the sale on May 14, 2012, and the transaction was consummated on June 1, 2012. Our Town Radio, Inc., is owned by Mark S. Sims (51%) and Robbie McAlpine (49%) of Oneonta, Alabama.

On 7/21/2015 Robbie McAlpine bought the other 51% from Mark Sims. Robbie McAlpine is 100% owner of Our Town Radio, Inc. The FCC filing can be found here: https://enterpriseefiling.fcc.gov/dataentry/views/public/assignmentDraftCopy?displayType=html&appKey=01ac944aad6f4c61928ac1b6063ebeb7&id=01ac944aad6f4c61928ac1b6063ebeb7&goBack=N

== Translators ==
WCRL rebroadcasts its signal on two FM translators:

Call sign	Frequency	City of license	FID	ERP (W)	Class	FCC info
W234DI	94.7 FM	Douglas, Alabama	202511	230	D	LMS
W237DH	95.3 FM	Oneonta, Alabama	150993	85	D	LMS
