= Alabama State Route 79 =

State highway in Alabama, United States

State Route 79

Route information
- Maintained by ALDOT
- Length: 117 mi (188 km)

Major junctions
- South end: I-20 / I-59 at Birmingham
- Future I-422 / SR 959 near Pinson; US 231 at Cleveland; US 278 east of Blountsvile; US 431 at Guntersville; SR 69 at Guntersville; SR 227 at Guntersville; US 72 at Scottsboro
- North end: SR 16 at the Tennessee state line near Hytop

Location
- Country: United States
- State: Alabama
- Counties: Jefferson, Blount, Marshall, Jackson

Highway system
- Alabama State Highway System; Interstate; US; State
← US 78	→ US 80

State Route 79 (SR 79) is a 117-mile-long (188 km) state highway that extends northeastward from Birmingham to the Tennessee state line. Prior to the completion of Interstate 65 (I-65), SR 79 was the southern part of the route that connected Birmingham and Huntsville.

The southern terminus of SR 79 is at an interchange of Tallapoosa Street with I-20/I-59 (exit 128) near Birmingham–Shuttlesworth International Airport. Prior to the completion of I-20/I-59, the terminus of SR 79 was at an intersection with US 31, US 78, and US 280 at the intersection of 8th Avenue North and 24th Street in downtown Birmingham.

== Route description ==
SR 79 begins at a modified-diamond-interchange with I-20/59 in east Birmingham, near Birmingham Int'l Airport. The route turns northeast on a four-lane divided highway and continues in this direction until it reaches Pinson. It junctions with SR 151, which leads to SR 75. The route loses its four-lane divided highway status and becomes a two-lane road, crossing into Blount County.

In southern Blount County, there are no major junctions until it reaches Cleveland. It junctions with SR 160 and continues north for just about a mile, reaching US 231. It continues on its right-of-way until it crosses the Locust Fork and leaves US 231 in Blountsville. It junctions with US 278 a few miles later. It eventually enters Marshall County.

It eventually reaches Guntersville. It junctions with US 431. It maintains a concurrency with it, junctioning with SR 69 and SR 227 before splitting off from US 431 and heading north to the Jackson County line.

In Jackson County, there are no major junctions until it turns off of its right-of-way, with its right-of-way becoming SR 279, in Scottsboro. It junctions with US 72 and SR 35 before leaving the city. In Skyline, the route junctions with SR 146. It continues north until it crosses the Tennessee state line, where it continues as Tennessee State Route 16 (SR 16) towards Winchester, TN.

== Future ==
Due to population growth in the area, there is a proposed project to widen SR 79 to four lanes into southwestern Blount County.

== Major intersections ==
County	Location	mi	km	Destinations	Notes
Jefferson	Birmingham	0.000	0.000	40th Street North	Southern terminus
Jefferson	Birmingham	0.099	0.159	I-20 / I-59 – Tuscaloosa, Gadsden, Atlanta	I-20/I-59 exit 128
Jefferson	Pinson	12.296	19.788	SR 151 north / CR 131 west (Narrows Road) to SR 75 – Oneonta	Southern terminus of SR 151
Jefferson	Pinson			SR 959	Temporary western terminus of SR 959; future I-422
Blount	Cleveland	34.395	55.353	SR 160 – Nectar, Hayden, Cleveland	
Blount	Cleveland	35.948	57.853	US 231 south (SR 53) – Montgomery, Oneonta	Southern end of US 231/SR 53 concurrency
Blount		37.766	60.778	US 231 north (SR 53) – Blountsville, Arab	Northern end of US 231/SR 53 concurrency
Blount	Brooksville	48.862	78.636	US 278 (SR 74) – Cullman, Gadsden	
Marshall	Guntersville	64.279	103.447	US 431 south (SR 1) – Albertville, Gadsden	Southern end of US 431/SR 1 concurrency
Marshall	Guntersville	65.359	105.185	SR 69 south – Cullman, Arab, Tuscaloosa, Jackson	Northern terminus of SR 69
Marshall	Guntersville	65.727	105.777	SR 227 north – Lake Guntersville State Park, Bucks Pocket State Park	Southern terminus of SR 227
Marshall		71.651	115.311	US 431 north (SR 1) – Huntsville	Northern end of US 431/SR 1 concurrency
Jackson	Scottsboro	88.671	142.702	SR 279 north – Scottsboro	Southern terminus of SR 279
Jackson	Scottsboro	90.430	145.533	US 72 (SR 2) – Huntsville, Scottsboro	
Jackson	Scottsboro	95.303	153.375	SR 35 – Woodville, Scottsboro	
Jackson		107.353	172.768	SR 146 west / CR 107 south	Eastern terminus of SR 146
Jackson		117.605	189.267	SR 16 north (Rowe Gap Road) – Winchester	Continuation into Tennessee
1.000 mi = 1.609 km; 1.000 km = 0.621 mi: Concurrency terminus
