= Hayden, Alabama =

- Town
- Location of Hayden in Blount County, Alabama.
- Coordinates: 33°51′50″N 86°48′05″W
- Country: United States
- State: Alabama
- County: Blount

Area
  - Total: 4.01 sq mi (10.39 km^{2})
  - Land: 4.01 sq mi (10.39 km^{2})
  - Water: 0 sq mi (0.00 km^{2})
- Elevation: 548 ft (167 m)

Population (2020)
  - Total: 1,342
  - Density: 334.7/sq mi (129.22/km^{2})
- Time zone: UTC-6 (Central (CST))
  - Summer (DST): UTC-5 (CDT)
- ZIP code: 35079
- Area codes: 205, 659
- FIPS code: 01-33640
- GNIS feature ID: 2405806
- Website: www.townofhayden.com

Hayden is a town in Blount County, Alabama, United States. At the 2020 census, the population was 1,342.

== Geography ==
Hayden is located in southwestern Blount County. Hayden Mountain is a broad, low ridge that rises to the northwest above the town. Alabama State Route 160 passes through the center of the town, leading 5 miles (8 km) southwest to Interstate 65 north of Warrior, and northeast 13 miles (21 km) to Cleveland.

According to the U.S. Census Bureau, the town of Hayden has a total area of 4.0 square miles (10.3 km^{2}), all land. Hayden has a spread out area consisting of many enclaves and exclaves within the town and the rest of Blount County.

== Demographics ==
Historical population
Census	Pop.	Note	%±
1950	203		—
1960	187		−7.9%
1970	195		4.3%
1980	268		37.4%
1990	385		43.7%
2000	470		22.1%
2010	444		−5.5%
2020	1,342		202.3%
U.S. Decennial Census; 2013 Estimate

=== 2020 census ===
Hayden racial composition
Race	Num.	Perc.
White (non-Hispanic)	1,220	90.91%
Black or African American (non-Hispanic)	19	1.42%
Native American	5	0.37%
Other/Mixed	67	4.99%
Hispanic or Latino	31	2.31%

As of the 2020 census, Hayden had a population of 1,342. The median age was 40.9 years. 23.5% of residents were under the age of 18 and 16.5% were 65 years of age or older. For every 100 females, there were 96.8 males, and for every 100 females age 18 and over, there were 96.6 males age 18 and over.

0.0% of residents lived in urban areas, while 100.0% lived in rural areas.

There were 504 households in Hayden and 316 families. Of all households, 34.7% had children under the age of 18 living in them. Of all households, 56.0% were married-couple households, 18.8% were households with a male householder and no spouse or partner present, and 20.6% were households with a female householder and no spouse or partner present. About 22.4% of all households were made up of individuals and 12.5% had someone living alone who was 65 years of age or older.

There were 547 housing units, of which 7.9% were vacant. The homeowner vacancy rate was 1.8% and the rental vacancy rate was 4.1%.

=== 2010 census ===
At the 2010 census, there were 444 people, 188 households, and 134 families residing in the town. The population density was 396.4 inhabitants per square mile (153.1/km^{2}), with 211 housing units at an average density of 188.4 per square mile (72.7/km^{2}). The racial makeup of the town was 389 (87.61%) white, 39 (8.78%) black, 3 (0.68%) Native American, 1 (0.23%) Asian, and 12 (2.7%) from two or more races. None of the town's population was Hispanic or Latino.

There were 188 households, of which 53 (28.19%) had children under the age of 18 living with them, 93 (49.47%) were married couples living together, 27 (14.36%) had a female householder with no husband present, 11 (5.85%) were unmarried opposite-sex couples, and 54 (28.72%) were non-families. 49 (26.06%) of all households were made up of individuals, and 20 (10.64%) had someone living alone who was 65 years of age or older. The average household size was 2.36, and the average family size was 2.81.

The population was spread out, with 93 (20.9%) under the age of 18, 39 (8.78%) aged 18 to 24, 108 (24.32%) aged 25 to 44, 143 (32.21%) aged 45 to 64, and 61 (13.7%) who were 65 years of age or older. The median age was 43 years. For every 100 females, there were 98.2 males.

=== 2000 census ===
At the 2000 census, there were 470 people, 191 households and 136 families residing in the town. The population density was 499.1 inhabitants per square mile (192.7/km^{2}). There were 207 housing units at an average density of 219.8 per square mile (84.9/km^{2}). The racial makeup of the town was 91.91% White, 6.60% Black or African American, 0.64% Native American, 0.43% Asian, and 0.43% from two or more races. 0.21% of the population were Hispanic or Latino of any race.

There were 191 households, of which 35.6% had children under the age of 18 living with them, 59.2% were married couples living together, 10.5% had a female householder with no husband present, and 28.3% were non-families. 26.7% of all households were made up of individuals, and 8.9% had someone living alone who was 65 years of age or older. The average household size was 2.46 and the average family size was 2.98.

Age distribution was 26.8% under the age of 18, 9.6% from 18 to 24, 28.3% from 25 to 44, 25.3% from 45 to 64, and 10.0% who were 65 years of age or older. The median age was 36 years. For every 100 females, there were 93.4 males. For every 100 females age 18 and over, there were 88.0 males.

The median household income was $31,484, and the median family income was $36,667. Males had a median income of $30,667 versus $17,375 for females. The per capita income for the town was $14,435. About 10.7% of families and 11.0% of the population were below the poverty line, including 6.9% of those under age 18 and 20.3% of those age 65 or over.

== Notable person ==
- Gerald Swindle, professional bass angler who was named 2004 and 2016 Bassmaster Angler of the Year
