= Tabernacle Christian School =

Private Christian School in Gardendale, Alabama, United States

Location
- 2649 Decatur Hwy; Gardendale, Alabama 35071; United States; 33.69077°N 86.81864°W

Information
- Established: 1974 (52 years ago)
- CEEB code: 011207
- Principal: Trevor Read
- Grades: PK-12
- Enrollment: 376
- Colors: Blue & Red
- Team name: Torches
- Accreditation: None
- Website: www.tabernaclechristian.org

Tabernacle Christian School is a private Christian School in Gardendale, Alabama, United States, serving grades K3-12. The current principal is Trevor Read, who came to the school in 2025.

TCS was founded by Dr. Ronald Dabbs, former Pastor of Gardendale Baptist Tabernacle (GBT) in 1974. Since its inception, Tabernacle has been the largest private school in north Jefferson County and one of the largest Christian schools in Birmingham metropolitan area.

Tabernacle was one of the driving forces behind the creation of the Alabama Christian Education Association (ACEA), the largest Christian school association in Alabama, in 1975. Former Tabernacle Principal Robin Mears currently serves as Executive Director of the ACEA.

== Academics ==
Tabernacle became ineligible for Alabama state assistance when it failed to achieve accreditation in accord with state standards.

Tabernacle Christian uses the A Beka Book and Bob Jones University curricula. TCS hosts the ACEA State Academic Competition in January of each year.

== Athletics ==
Tabernacle fields an eight-man football. The team won the Christian Football Association state championship in 2011 and 2012.
