= Blountsville, Alabama =

- Town
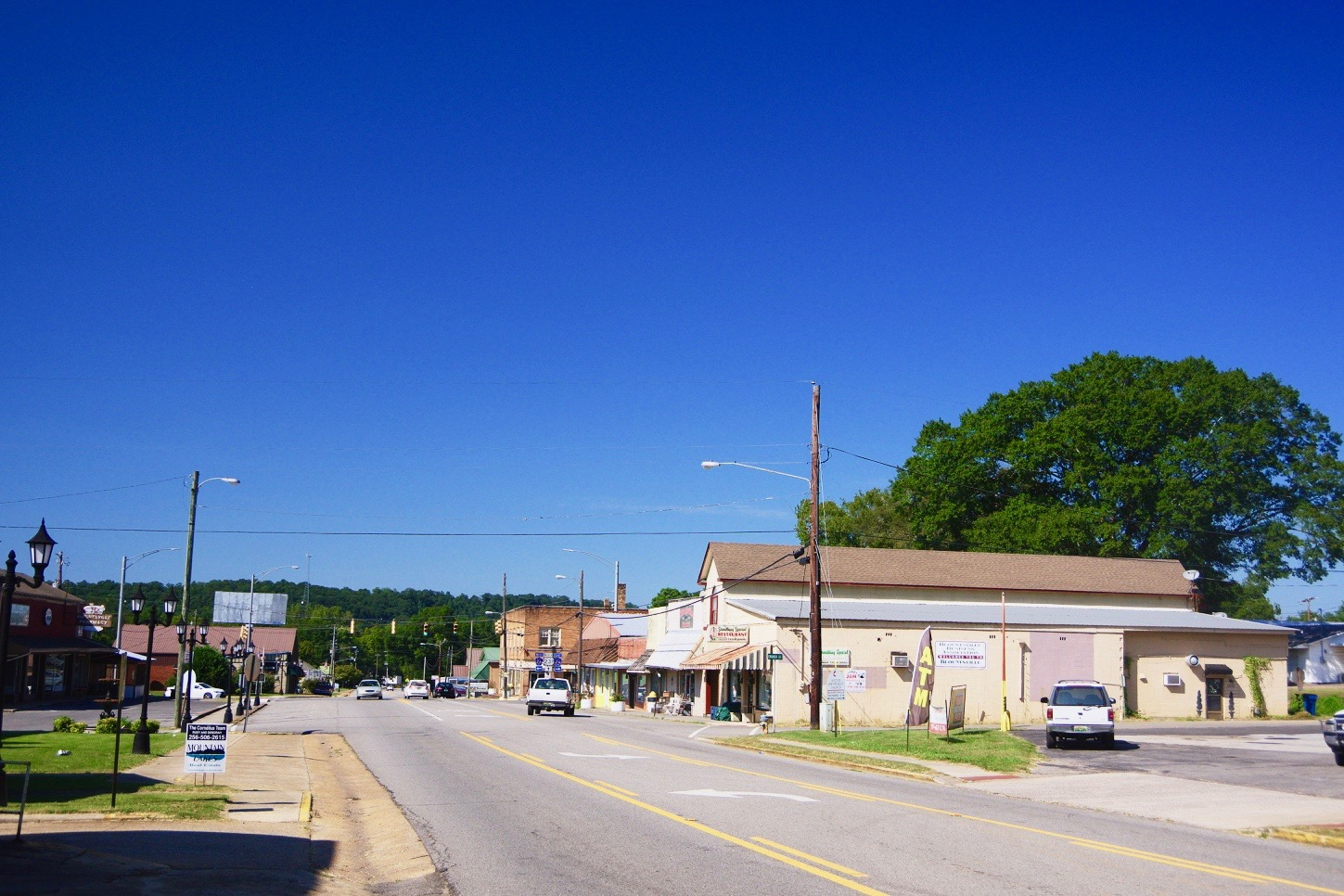
- Main Street (U.S. Route 231)

- Location of Blountsville in Blount County, Alabama.
- Coordinates: 34°04′53″N 86°35′12″W
- Country: United States
- State: Alabama
- County: Blount

Government
  - Type: Mayor-Council
  - Mayor: Michael Glass

Area
  - Total: 5.49 sq mi (14.22 km^{2})
  - Land: 5.42 sq mi (14.04 km^{2})
  - Water: 0.069 sq mi (0.18 km^{2})
- Elevation: 764 ft (233 m)

Population (2020)
  - Total: 1,826
  - Density: 336.9/sq mi (130.06/km^{2})
- Time zone: UTC-6 (Central (CST))
  - Summer (DST): UTC-5 (CDT)
- ZIP code: 35031
- Area codes: 205, 659
- FIPS code: 01-07456
- GNIS feature ID: 2405280
- Website: blountsvilleal.com

Blountsville is a town in Blount County, Alabama, United States. As of the 2020 census it had a population of 1,826.

Blount County was created by the Alabama territorial legislature on February 6, 1818, from land ceded to the federal government by the Creek Nation on August 9, 1814. It was named for Gov. Willie G. Blount of Tennessee, who provided assistance to settlers in Alabama during the Creek War of 1813–14. It lies in the northeastern section of the state, generally known as the mineral region.

== History ==
What became Blountsville appears on an 1819 map as the mixed Creek/Cherokee Native American village of "Wassausey" (meaning Bear Meat Cabin, the name of an Indian translator who lived there). The town was established by Caleb Fryley and Johnny Jones in 1816 as Bear Meat Cabin. It became a popular stop for westward-bound settlers who streamed into the area at the end of the Creek War. The post office was opened as Blountsville on October 20, 1825, and incorporated on December 13, 1827. It was the county seat until 1889 when the government was moved to Oneonta.

There were many schools in the town in the early years: The Academy, Blount College and the District Agricultural School, plus the public schools. The Blount County Courthouse and jail was built in 1833 and remained there until it was moved to Oneonta. A major crossroads in early Alabama, Blountsville became a Confederate depot for the cavalry. Confederate forces led by General Nathan Bedford Forrest and Union forces led by General Abel Streight skirmished briefly in the town on May 1, 1863, and Major General Lovell H. Rousseau and his Union cavalry occupied the town in July 1864. Blount College was in the building that was originally the courthouse. It was established in 1890. The beautiful Blountsville United Methodist Church was established in 1818 and is the oldest building in Blountsville and is still in use today. Another old building in Blountsville was once known as the Barclift House. Built in 1834 as Hendricks Tavern, it is now owned and is being restored by the Ortiz family.

== Geography ==
Blountsville is located in northern Blount County, in the Blountsville Valley at the intersection of County Highway 26 and U.S. Highway 231. Route 231 leads south 6 miles (10 km) to Cleveland and 14 miles (23 km) to Oneonta, the county seat, and north 50 miles (80 km) to Huntsville. Alabama Highway 79 runs through the southern corner of Blountsville, leading northeast to Guntersville and southwest to Birmingham.

According to the U.S. Census Bureau, Blountsville has a total area of 5.5 square miles (14.2 km^{2}), of which 5.4 square miles (14.0 km^{2}) is land and 0.077 square miles (0.2 km^{2}), or 1.27%, is water.

== Government and public safety ==
Blountsville utilizes a Mayor/Council form of government. The current Mayor of the Town is Mike Glass. Blountsville has a full time police force led by Police Chief Phillip Weaver. Blountsville has a combination Fire & Rescue Department that is made up of both paid and volunteer personnel led by Fire Chief Braden Foy. Both the Police and Fire Departments cover areas of unincorporated Blount County outside of the Town Limits. The Fire Department serves a total area of 55 square miles within its primary jurisdiction and responds to approximately 1250 calls annually, making the department the 2nd largest by area and the third busiest by call volume in Blount County.

== Demographics ==
Historical population
Census	Pop.	Note	%±
1880	222		—
1890	288		29.7%
1910	287		—
1920	427		48.8%
1930	468		9.6%
1940	576		23.1%
1950	695		20.7%
1960	672		−3.3%
1970	1,254		86.6%
1980	1,509		20.3%
1990	1,527		1.2%
2000	1,768		15.8%
2010	1,684		−4.8%
2020	1,826		8.4%
U.S. Decennial Census; 2013 Estimate

=== Racial and ethnic composition ===
Blountsville town, Alabama – Racial and ethnic composition Note: the US Census treats Hispanic/Latino as an ethnic category. This table excludes Latinos from the racial categories and assigns them to a separate category. Hispanics/Latinos may be of any race. Race and ethnicity were not surveyed for populations under 2,500 in 1980 and under 1,000 in 1990.
Race / Ethnicity (NH = Non-Hispanic)	Pop 1980	Pop 2000	Pop 2010	Pop 2020	% 1990	% 2000	% 2010	% 2020
White alone (NH)	1,492	1,449	1,369	1,335	97.71%	81.96%	81.29%	73.11%
Black or African American alone (NH)	0	0	11	11	0.00%	0.00%	0.65%	0.60%
Native American or Alaska Native alone (NH)	6	9	16	11	0.39%	0.51%	0.95%	0.60%
Asian alone (NH)	4	5	6	23	0.26%	0.28%	0.36%	1.26%
Native Hawaiian or Pacific Islander alone (NH)	x	1	6	0	x	0.06%	0.36%	0.00%
Other race alone (NH)	0	0	5	3	0.00%	0.00%	0.30%	0.16%
Mixed race or Multiracial (NH)	x	18	14	45	x	1.02%	0.83%	2.46%
Hispanic or Latino (any race)	25	286	257	398	1.64%	16.18%	15.26%	21.80%
Total	1,527	1,768	1,684	1,826	100.00%	100.00%	100.00%	100.00%

=== 2020 census ===
As of the 2020 census, Blountsville had a population of 1,826. The median age was 34.9 years. 29.2% of residents were under the age of 18 and 15.4% of residents were 65 years of age or older. For every 100 females there were 89.8 males, and for every 100 females age 18 and over there were 90.0 males age 18 and over.

0.0% of residents lived in urban areas, while 100.0% lived in rural areas.

Of all households in Blountsville, 36.8% had children under the age of 18 living in them. 46.1% were married-couple households, 18.6% were households with a male householder and no spouse or partner present, and 31.6% were households with a female householder and no spouse or partner present. About 27.9% of all households were made up of individuals and 12.9% had someone living alone who was 65 years of age or older.

There were 752 housing units, of which 12.9% were vacant. The homeowner vacancy rate was 0.6% and the rental vacancy rate was 3.9%.

=== 2010 census ===
As of the census of 2010, there were 1,684 people, 654 households, and 439 families residing in the town. The population density was 311 inhabitants per square mile (120/km^{2}). There were 791 housing units at an average density of 143.8 per square mile (55.5/km^{2}). The racial makeup of the town was 87.3% White, 0.7% Black, 1.0% Native American, 0.4% Asian, 0.9% Pacific Islander, 8.8% from other races, and 1.0% from two or more races. 15.3% of the population were Hispanic or Latino of any race.

There were 654 households, out of which 30.7% had children under the age of 18 living with them, 48.0% were married couples living together, 14.1% had a female householder with no husband present, and 32.9% were non-families. 29.2% of all households were made up of individuals, and 14.9% had someone living alone who was 65 years of age or older. The average household size was 2.57 and the average family size was 3.16.

In the town, the population was spread out, with 25.8% under the age of 18, 9.6% from 18 to 24, 25.4% from 25 to 44, 24.5% from 45 to 64, and 14.7% who were 65 years of age or older. The median age was 37.6 years. For every 100 females, there were 94.5 males. For every 100 females age 18 and over, there were 101.8 males.

The median income for a household in the town was $25,238, and the median income for a family was $41,042. Males had a median income of $23,839 versus $24,940 for females. The per capita income for the town was $15,372. About 13.0% of families and 18.2% of the population were below the poverty line, including 16.0% of those under age 18 and 20.1% of those age 65 or over.

== Education ==
J.B. Pennington High School (PHS) and Blountsville Elementary School (BES), the town's only two schools, are located in the center of Blountsville. They are both in the Blount County School District.

== Attractions ==
The Freeman House, built circa 1825, was damaged by a storm, and the two-story brick dwelling was rebuilt, using the same bricks, into a one story. The porches face the historic Meat Cabin Road, and the other porch faces U.S. Highway 231. The structure has been renovated by the Blountsville Historical Society and now serves as a museum and visitors' center. Several other buildings of the period have been added to the park and are furnished with period furnishings. The park is open to the public for tours.

The Thomas Nation House, circa 1835, is now a ruin due to a storm that took all but one and one half walls down in 1998 before the house could be stabilized. The ruins can still be seen from U.S. Highway 231.

Blountsville is also home to the Spring Valley Beach Water Park, a water park offering several water slides.
