= Zozlan railway station =

Railway station in Pakistan

Zozlan railway station زوزلان ریلوے اسٹیشن

General information
- Coordinates: 30.798105°N 66.619464°E
- Owner: Ministry of Railways

Other information
- Station code: ZZN
Location

Zozlan railway station (Urdu: زوزلان ریلوے اسٹیشن) is located in Pakistan.

== See also ==
- List of railway stations in Pakistan
- Pakistan Railways
