= Gardendale, Alabama =

City in Alabama, United States

- City
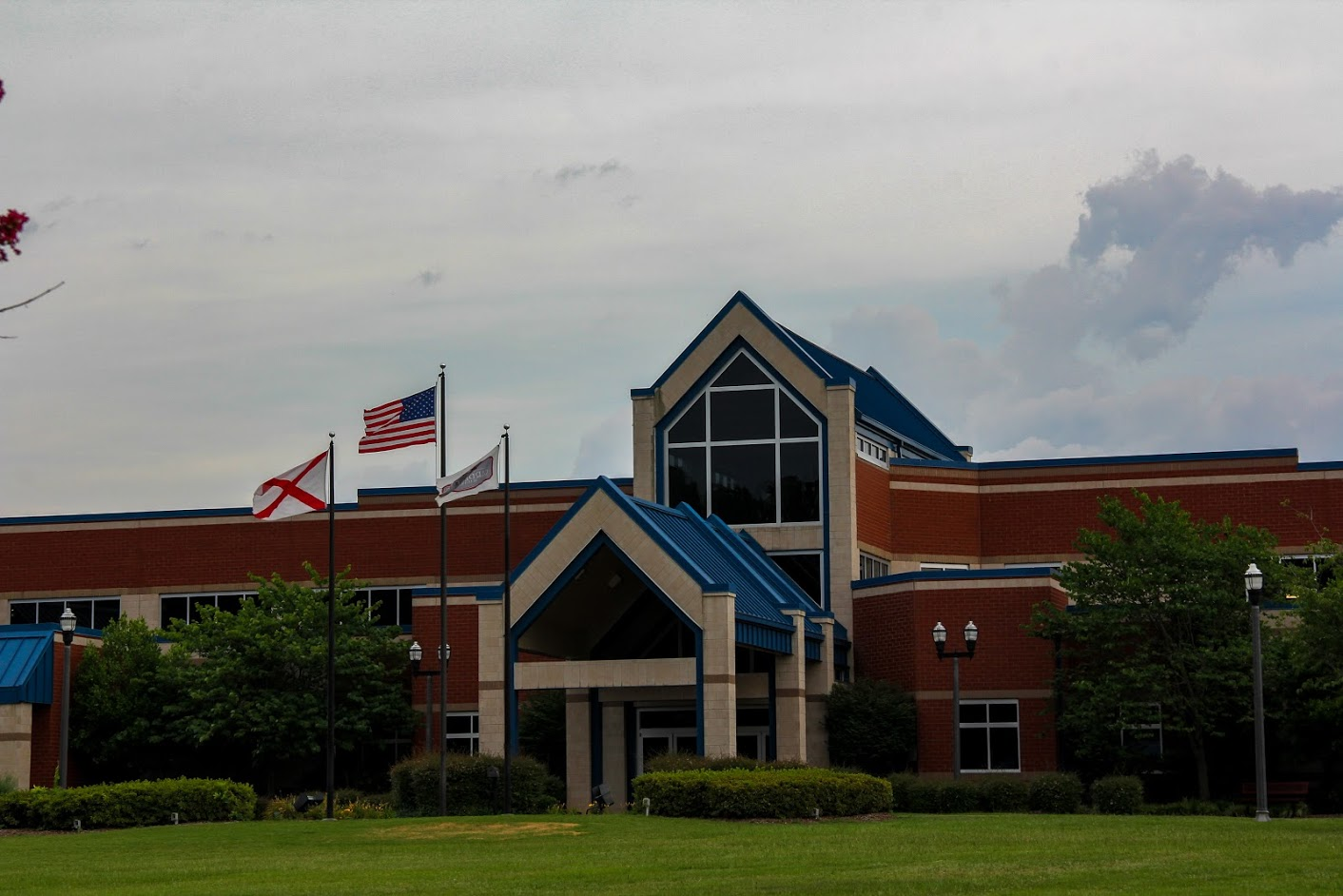
- Gardendale Civic Center (2015)

- Flag Seal Logo

- Location of Gardendale in Jefferson County, Alabama.
- Coordinates: 33°39′22″N 86°48′38″W
- Country: United States
- State: Alabama
- County: Jefferson
- Settled: 1825
- Incorporated: 1955

Area
  - Total: 22.98 sq mi (59.53 km^{2})
  - Land: 22.98 sq mi (59.52 km^{2})
  - Water: 0.0039 sq mi (0.01 km^{2})
- Elevation: 669 ft (204 m)

Population (2020)
  - Total: 16,044
  - Density: 698.2/sq mi (269.56/km^{2})
- Time zone: UTC-6 (CST)
  - Summer (DST): UTC-5 (CDT)
- ZIP code: 35071
- Area code: 205 & 659
- FIPS code: 01-29056
- GNIS ID: 2403681
- Website: www.gardendale.gov

Gardendale is a city in Jefferson County, Alabama, United States and a northern suburb of Birmingham. The population was 16,044 at the 2020 census.

== History ==
A large farm settlement near the area today known as Gardendale was settled around 1825. Some years later, other settlers began to move into the community commonly known as Jugtown, a name given to the area based on the presence of a large jug and churn factory that operated in the area. Some years later, Hettie Thomason Cargo, a school teacher, would lead a campaign to change the name of the community after being embarrassed to admit she was from "Jugtown" at a regional teachers' meeting. In 1906, the name Gardendale was selected, and in 1955, the City of Gardendale was officially incorporated. Today, with more than 16,000 residents (estimated), the city of Gardendale has grown to include more than 400 businesses, 4 schools, and 24 churches.

In 1996, the Olympic torch run passed through the city during the weeks leading up to the 1996 Summer Olympic Games in Atlanta. Before Interstate 65 was constructed, the main route between Nashville, Tennessee and Birmingham, Alabama was U.S. Route 31. Prior to being built as a four-lane road, U.S. 31 was a twisting two-lane road that is still largely visible today. From the north end of Gardendale, it is now Snow Rogers Road, North Road, Moncrief Road, and then Main Street southward through the city to the Fultondale city limit where it becomes Stouts Road. In the fall of 2008, new signs were placed along the original route of Stouts Road through Gardendale denoting its historical significance as a stagecoach route between Tennessee and Birmingham during the 19th century. The first traffic signals in the city were located along U.S. 31 at Tarrant Road, Fieldstown Road, and Moncrief Road as well as Tarrant Road at Pineywood Road. A new signal at the intersection of Fieldstown Road and Main Street near city hall replaced a blinking signal shortly thereafter. Fieldstown Road was a narrow two lane road from U.S. 31 westward until Interstate 65 was built and then Fieldstown Road was re-routed onto the new road in the mid-1980s. An abundance of traffic signals have been erected in the city since those early days. In approximately 1970, the city installed street lights along U.S. 31 from the Fultondale city limits northward to the Moncrief Road intersection. The technology at that time was for blue vapor lights. Today, nearly 40 years later those same blue vapor lights still exist with some being replaced with the more modern bulbs near major intersections. Since 1980, Gardendale has annexed considerable amounts of land on the north, east, and west sides. Much of the eastern area is uninhabited. The western annexation is centered along Fieldstown Road. Most of the newest residential development has been in this area and along Shady Grove Road south of Fieldstown Road. The northern annexation has centered along US 31 and extends nearly 2 miles (3.2 km) farther north than 1980. The city has a working historical society, established January 23, 2006, that is working to record the history of the Gardendale area. They have a museum that is open to the public on Thursdays and Saturdays. It contains a variety of photographs, documents, and other historical memorabilia from Gardendale.

== Geography ==
According to the U.S. Census Bureau, the city has a total area of 18.0 square miles (47 km^{2}), all land. However, with the recent annexation of several thousand acres from the community of Mt. Olive and other unincorporated areas, the city now has an estimated total area of around 25.0 square miles (65 km^{2}). Gardendale is situated along one of the three major transportation corridors from the Midwest to the Gulf Coast (I-75, I-65, I-55). A tremendous volume of freight (via rail and truck) passes through or near Gardendale.

Gardendale is served by two major north–south highways: Interstate 65 and U.S. 31. A new interstate highway, Interstate 22 will run northwestward from I-65 near Gardendale towards Memphis, Tennessee. This freeway is open from Coalburg Road near Fultondale just southwest of Gardendale to Memphis. Another future road project is the Northern Beltline which will run from Interstate 59 near Argo westward across northern Jefferson County, crossing I-65 on the northern edge of Gardendale. This highway is currently designated to become Interstate 422. This route is some 15–20 years away from completion. Major east–west roads in Gardendale include Fieldstown Road (there has been some discussion of requesting a state highway designation for this road between US 31 and I-65 and perhaps westward towards I-22) which runs from U.S. 31 in Gardendale westward, Tarrant Road which runs from the city eastward, and Mt. Olive Road which runs northwestward from the city. Another future road project may be an extension of Fieldstown Road east of U.S. 31 to connect to the Castle Pines development (which is in the city but only accessible via a roundabout route nearly 10 miles (16 km) long) and then across New Castle Road, and then further east to connect to Carson Road. Gardendale is located in an area that once yielded large amounts of coal. Gardendale is located at the southwestern end of one of the Appalachian ridgelines running from eastern Tennessee into northeast Alabama. Several old and closed coal mines exist in the area as well as lands that were once strip mined and then replanted for forests. No major waterways are located in Gardendale but several streams feed into the Locust Fork of the Black Warrior River that passes north and west of the city. Much of the land inside the city limits on the east and northeast sides of Gardendale is rocky and hilly with deep ravines. This portion of the city is sparsely populated and has limited access by road. The only major rail line passing near Gardendale is a north–south track passing on the eastern edge of the city from Boyles Yard near Tarrant paralleling New Castle Road northward towards Blount County. This rail line carries freight and is not a passenger line. The nearest passenger train service is by Amtrak at the Birmingham station 10 miles (16 km) south of Gardendale. Commercial air travel is located at the nearby Birmingham-Shuttlesworth International Airport.

== Demographics ==
Historical population
Census	Pop.	Note	%±
1960	4,712		—
1970	6,537		38.7%
1980	8,005		22.5%
1990	9,251		15.6%
2000	11,626		25.7%
2010	13,893		19.5%
2020	16,044		15.5%
2025 (est.)	16,425	▲	2.4%
U.S. Decennial Census

=== Racial and ethnic composition ===
Gardendale city, Alabama – Racial and ethnic composition Note: the US Census treats Hispanic/Latino as an ethnic category. This table excludes Latinos from the racial categories and assigns them to a separate category. Hispanics/Latinos may be of any race. Race and ethnicity was not surveyed for populations under 2,500 in the 1980 census and under 1,000 in 1990 census.
Race / Ethnicity (NH = Non-Hispanic)	Pop 1990	Pop 2000	Pop 2010	Pop 2020	% 1990	% 2000	% 2010	% 2020
White alone (NH)	9,065	11,243	12,180	12,254	97.99%	96.71%	87.67%	76.38%
Black or African American alone (NH)	123	172	1,184	2,404	1.33%	1.48%	8.52%	14.98%
Native American or Alaska Native alone (NH)	16	20	37	36	0.17%	0.17%	0.27%	0.22%
Asian alone (NH)	9	59	158	267	0.10%	0.51%	1.14%	1.66%
Native Hawaiian or Pacific Islander alone (NH)	x	2	3	11	x	0.02%	0.02%	0.07%
Other race alone (NH)	2	1	5	53	0.02%	0.01%	0.04%	0.33%
Mixed race or Multiracial (NH)	x	54	119	553	x	0.46%	0.86%	3.45%
Hispanic or Latino (any race)	36	75	207	466	0.39%	0.65%	1.49%	2.90%
Total	9,251	11,626	13,893	16,044	100.00%	100.00%	100.00%	100.00%

=== 2020 census ===
As of the 2020 census, Gardendale had a population of 16,044. The median age was 42.2 years. 21.3% of residents were under the age of 18 and 21.0% of residents were 65 years of age or older. For every 100 females there were 86.0 males, and for every 100 females age 18 and over there were 82.0 males age 18 and over.

92.8% of residents lived in urban areas, while 7.2% lived in rural areas.

There were 6,508 households in Gardendale, including 3,790 families. Of these, 29.7% had children under the age of 18 living in them. Of all households, 51.3% were married-couple households, 13.4% were households with a male householder and no spouse or partner present, and 31.5% were households with a female householder and no spouse or partner present. About 27.5% of all households were made up of individuals and 14.5% had someone living alone who was 65 years of age or older.

There were 6,854 housing units, of which 5.0% were vacant. The homeowner vacancy rate was 1.3% and the rental vacancy rate was 8.9%.

=== 2010 census ===
As of the census of 2010, there were 13,893 people, 5,670 households, and 3,979 families residing in the city. The population density was 746.1 inhabitants per square mile (288.1/km^{2}). There were 6,040 housing units at an average density of 337.4 per square mile (130.3/km^{2}). The racial makeup of the city was 88.4% White, 8.6% Black or African American, 0.3% Native American, 1.2% Asian, 0.0% Pacific Islander, 0.6% from other races, and 1.0% from two or more races. 1.5% of the population were Hispanic or Latino of any race.

There were 5,670 households, out of which 27.4% had children under the age of 18 living with them, 56.1% were married couples living together, 11.2% had a female householder with no husband present, and 29.8% were non-families. 26.5% of all households were made up of individuals, and 12.7% had someone living alone who was 65 years of age or older. The average household size was 2.42 and the average family size was 2.92.

The median income for a household in the city was $60,244, and the median income for a family was $79,044. Males had a median income of $52,782 versus $41,224 for females. The per capita income for the city was $30,748. About 1.9% of families and 3.5% of the population were below the poverty line, including 3.2% of those under age 18 and 6.3% of those age 65 or over.

=== 2000 census ===
As of the census of 2000, there were 11,626 people, 4,733 households, and 3,474 families residing in the city. The population density was 647.9 inhabitants per square mile (250.2/km^{2}). There were 4,959 housing units at an average density of 276.3 per square mile (106.7/km^{2}). The racial makeup of the city was 97.19% White, 1.48% Black or African American, 0.17% Native American, 0.53% Asian, 0.02% Pacific Islander, 0.14% from other races, and 0.47% from two or more races. 0.65% of the population were Hispanic or Latino of any race.

There were 4,733 households, out of which 28.8% had children under the age of 18 living with them, 61.3% were married couples living together, 9.6% had a female householder with no husband present, and 26.6% were non-families. 24.6% of all households were made up of individuals, and 11.7% had someone living alone who was 65 years of age or older. The average household size was 2.42 and the average family size was 2.88.

The median income for a household in the city was $45,786, and the median income for a family was $56,929. Males had a median income of $36,714 versus $29,039 for females. The per capita income for the city was $22,673. About 3.5% of families and 5.1% of the population were below the poverty line, including 7.0% of those under age 18 and 7.3% of those age 65 or over.

== Economy ==
Most new business development in the past 10 years has been along Fieldstown Road (and Odum Road) on the west side of the city between I-65 and US 31. Additional development, but to a lesser extent, has occurred along Mt. Olive Road near I-65. Several older more mature shopping and dining areas exist along US 31. The new City Center is being developed on Mt. Olive Road just south of Fieldstown Road. The new city hall and offices will be located here.

New retail developments are slated near Interstate 65 at exit 275. This area is within the Gardendale city limits. Exit 275 is one mile from the future exit 274 Interstate 422. The interchange of these two interstates will spur commercial growth at exit 275. The segment of Interstate 422 from Alabama State Route 79 to Interstate 65 is currently slated to be the second segment of Interstate 422 to be constructed. The first segment is a short stretch between Alabama State Route 79 and Alabama State Route 75 near Pinson.

== Arts and culture ==
Annual events include the Magnolia Festival which occurs each spring and is held around and near the Civic Center complex on Main Street.

== Government ==
Gardendale uses the mayor/council form of government. Past mayors include J.I. Pesnell, Gilbert Jacks, James Yarbrough, Horace Parker, G. William Noble, Kenny Clemons, and Othell Phillips. Stan Hogeland is the current mayor.

The city council consists of five members. The city is divided into five geographic districts with each one electing a council member to represent it on the city council. The election cycle for the mayor and council members is every four years during the same years as presidential elections. The mayoral position became a full-time paid position following the 2008 elections. The city council chooses a member to become council president, who presides over the council meetings. The current council consists of: Bryan Knox (District 1), Adam Berendt (District 2), Alvin Currington (District 3, council president), Greg Colvert (District 4), and Will Hardman (District 5).

Gardendale has a full-time Police Department (Chief Scott Banks) and Fire Department (Chief Joe Thomas). The Fire & Rescue Department has three stations with station 1 located on Decatur Highway and station 2 located on Fieldstown Road and station 3 located on Tarrant Road. Fieldstown Volunteers, which is located in the western portion of the city, is a combination emergency response/disaster relief squad that mainly responds to large emergencies and provides support to other agencies.

Gardendale has a new City Hall that opened in 2015 on Main Street near the Civic Center. The previous city hall has been demolished and the property was sold to CVS for use as a pharmacy. The new Gardendale Civic Center is located on Main Street across from Gardendale High School. The Gardendale Public Library is located on Mt. Olive Road just south of the intersection of Mt. Olive Road and Fieldstown Road. A new municipal justice complex including court, police department, and jail has been located within the former Food World building facing US 31 just north of the city center area. Gardendale has several parks and athletic facilities. G. William Noble Park (formerly known as Moncrief Park) contains 6 baseball fields, 8 tennis courts, a football field, and 3 playgrounds as well as picnic and party facilities. It is located just off Moncrief Road on the northside of the city. The tennis courts are well maintained, and host many different events as do the baseball fields. G. William Noble Park is well kept and gets new playground equipment periodically. Luman Harris Park is a girls softball facility located just off Pineywood Road in the southeast part of the city. Also located there is the Miracle Park which is used for mentally and physically handicapped children. Mini Park, consisting of a playground for smaller children is located on Keith Circle, just north of Tarrant Road, four tenths of a mile east of US 31. Celebration Park is located on Fieldstown Road on the western edge of the city and contains two soccer fields and a walking track, a "splash pad" water park for children. Memorial Park is located between Main Street and US 31 in the north central part of the city and honors those who have served in the US Armed Forces. Past park facilities included two tennis courts and the old civic center which were located adjacent to city hall in the center of the city, two tennis courts located on Tarrant Road in the eastern edge of the city, a mini park located at the corner of Peterson Drive and Tarrant Road which contained an asphalt basketball court, and a softball field that was located behind the south end of Bragg Middle School.

== Education ==
=== Public ===
Gardendale is served by several schools operated by the Jefferson County Schools school district. Gardendale Elementary School which opened in 1969 and replaced the older elementary school located about 300 yards east of the current school. Bragg Middle School was built later to handle the growing student population. Until Bragg was opened, Gardendale High School handled grades 7–12. Both Gardendale High School and Bragg Middle School use the nickname Rockets and share the same colors of maroon and gray. Gardendale High School is rated as a 6A school for athletic competition for the two-year period beginning in the fall of 2010. Also located on the north side of Gardendale is Snow Rogers Elementary School. Snow Rogers school is unique in that although it is inside Gardendale city limits, it is a feeder school for both Bragg Middle School in Gardendale as well as North Jefferson Middle School located in nearby Kimberly, Alabama. These schools in turn feed into Gardendale High School and Mortimer Jordan High School located in nearby Kimberly, Alabama. Residential addresses of Snow Rogers students determine which school they go to once leaving Snow Rogers Elementary. Mt. Olive Elementary is located in the nearby unincorporated Mt. Olive community. Gardendale High School used the Rogers campus as well as temporary classroom buildings while a new high school was being constructed on the site of the former high school (which was built in the mid-1960s). The new high school opened in early 2010. Gardendale High School graduated its first students in 1968.

In November 2013, the city requested to break off its schools from those of Jefferson County and form its own mostly-White school system. The county schools had a majority of Black students. By establishing its own school district, Gardendale has ensured its schools will mostly have White students. Other towns in the county have followed this route and so moved toward de facto racial segregation. In early 2018, the attempt to break away from the county schools was squashed by the 11th Circuit Court of Appeals. Judge Madeline Haikala awarded the NAACP money on the grounds that the city government did not act in good faith, with the fine being almost $850,000. She stated the appellate argument had a "lack of candor".

Gardendale continues to impose its 10 mill tax while, at the same time, Jefferson County is imposing its countywide 8.8 mill tax for schools.

=== Private ===
Tabernacle Christian School is located on the northern side of the city, run by Gardendale Baptist Tabernacle. Their athletic teams carry the nickname Torches. Gardendale Christian Academy is also located on the northern side as a school and daycare run by Gardendale Church of the Nazarene. GCA's mascot is King's Knights.

=== Adult ===
Gardendale was once home to the Rogers Area Vocational School which has now been demolished to make way for soccer & baseball fields as well as student parking.

== Media ==
Gardendale is located within the Birmingham television and radio market, the 39th largest market in the United States.

Newspapers covering Gardendale include The Birmingham News (3x weekly, based in neighboring Birmingham); The North Jefferson News was once based in the city but merged with the Cullman Times in April 2020 and ceased operations under the North Jefferson News name at that time.

Radio station WPYA (97.3 FM) is licensed and identified on air as a Gardendale radio station. This station is a Top 40 (CHR) station that covers the Birmingham radio market. The broadcast studios and transmitter are not located in Gardendale even though the station is licensed to Gardendale.

== Infrastructure ==
=== Health care ===
In 2019, UAB opened a free-standing emergency room with outpatient clinics and helipad access. Large hospitals offering secondary and tertiary care, including a trauma center, are located nearby in Birmingham, the home of the University of Alabama School of Medicine, the UAB hospitals, Baptist Brookwood hospital system, and St. Vincent's hospital system . Gardendale is served by several small health centers/clinics that are part of these larger healthcare systems.

== Notable people ==
- Mario Addison - professional football player
- Jack Biddle - state legislator
- Chris Fryar - drummer for the Zac Brown Band
- Jordan Howard - professional football player for Philadelphia Eagles
- Pat Keedy - former professional baseball player for three teams
- Trey Mullinax - PGA professional golfer
- John Salter - mixed martial arts fighter
- Willie Wyatt - former Alabama Crimson Tide Football and Arena Football League player
