= Gerald Swindle =

American fisherman (born 1969)

Personal information
- Nickname: "The Gman"
- Born: December 17, 1969 (age 55)
- Height: 6 ft 4 in (1.93 m)
- Weight: 195 lb (88 kg)
- Website: GeraldSwindle.com

Sport
- Country: United States
- Sport: Bass fishing

Gerald Swindle (born December 17, 1969) is a professional bass angler from Locust Fork, Alabama. He was named the 2004 and 2016 Bassmaster Angler of the Year.

== Competitive statistics ==
Classic titles:	0
Times in the Classic:	10
Times in the money:	100
Total entries:	160
Total weight:	4,415 lbs 1 ozs
Career winnings:	$1,904,129.00
Avg. per tournament:	$6,275.81
Cash winnings:	$785,029.00
Merchandise bonus:	$42,000.00
Cash bonus:	$177,100.00

== Sponsorships ==
Swindle is sponsored by Vicious Fishing, Phoenix, Mercury Marine, 2 Handee, Moonpie Company, Lucky Craft, Arkie Jigs, MotorGuide, War Eagle Lures, Quantum Rods/Reels, Oakley, Vault, Toyota, Trokar, Zoom Bait Company, T-H Marine, Total Pain Solutions, and Sealy Outdoors.
