= Blount County School District =

School district in Alabama

Coordinates: 33.9460°N 86.4761°W

Blount County School District is a school district in Blount County, Alabama, United States.

== Schools ==
High Schools:

- Cleveland High School
- Hayden High School
- J.B. Pennington High School (Blountsville, Alabama)
- Locust Fork High School
- Susan Moore High School

Middle Schools:

- Hayden Middle School

Elementary Schools:

- Blountsville Elementary School
- Cleveland Elementary School
- Hayden Elementary School (Hayden, Alabama)
- Hayden Primary School (Hayden, Alabama)
- Locust Fork Elementary School
- Susan Moore Elementary School

Other:

- Appalachian School (Oneonta, Alabama)
- Blount County Career Technical Center (Cleveland, Alabama)
- Blount County Learning Center (Cleveland, Alabama)
- Southeastern School (Remlap, Alabama)
