= Birmingham Northern Beltline =

Proposed interstate highway in Alabama

Birmingham Northern Beltline
- Corridor X-1
- Proposed Birmingham Northern Beltline corridor highlighted in red

Route information
- Auxiliary route of I-22
- Maintained by ALDOT
- Length: 1.88 mi (3.03 km)
- Existed: September 29, 2026–present

Major junctions
- South end: SR 79 near Pinson
- North end: SR 75 near Pinson

Location
- Country: United States
- State: Alabama
- Counties: Jefferson

Highway system
- Alabama State Highway System; Interstate; US; State
← US 411	I-422	→ US 431
← SR 759		→ SR 1

Interstate 422 (I-422), Corridor X-1, or the Birmingham Northern Beltline is a proposed 52.5-mile-long (84.5 km) northern bypass route around Birmingham, Alabama, through northern and western Jefferson County that is projected to be completed by 2048. Along with the existing I-459, the Northern Beltline would complete the bypass loop of central Birmingham for all Interstate traffic. The project's budget is $5.445 billion; upon completion, the Northern Beltline will be the most expensive road in Alabama's history, and among the most expensive per mile ever built in the United States.

The route was first conceived in the 1960s, but funding issues and pushback from environmental activists have stalled the project for decades with only a short, unused segment being constructed in the mid-2010s. A 10-mile-long (16 km) section between Gardendale and Pinson was funded in spring 2023, but the start of construction was delayed by another complaint before construction on the initial unused segment resumed in June 2024 with a segment in Pinson opening to traffic in September 2026 as State Route 959 (SR 959).

Plans for the route have it connecting to I-59 at I-459's current southern terminus in Bessemer, at approximately milemarker 147 to the northeast of Trussville, near Argo. The route has been designated as the Appalachian Regional Commission's high-priority Corridor X-1, unsigned SR 959, and I-422.

== History ==
As early as the 1960s, the prospect of a complete beltway encircling Birmingham was envisioned. Although the proposal was initially dropped from the original Interstate Highway System, the completion of Birmingham's outer beltway has been speculated since the completion of I-459 in 1985. By 1989, the first federal and local funds were earmarked for a project to study the feasibility of constructing the route.

In September 1993, the Birmingham Metropolitan Planning Organization made a $500,000 request from the Alabama Department of Transportation (ALDOT) for preliminary engineering of the beltline. Through the continued efforts of representative Spencer Bachus, in June 1995, the project was designated by the Federal Highway Administration (FHA) as part of the National Highway System. As a result of this designation, the beltline would be eligible for federal transportation funding.

In 1997, the Environmental Protection Agency (EPA) reviewed a number of potential routes for the Birmingham Northern Beltline. They submitted comments on September 8, 1997, and recommended ALDOT select a shorter, 30-mile (48 km) route due to its smaller environmental impact. They also firmly recommended against the longest route, citing that the route would "disrupt streams at 14 crossings, impact over 4050 acres [1,640 ha] forested lands within the ROW, and will destroy up to 68 acres [28 ha] of wetlands at 114 different sites. It will also have the greatest impact on wildlife of all the alignments discussed". This is the route that ALDOT eventually selected for the Northern Beltline.

In 2000, the Northern Beltline was added to the area’s Transportation Plan, and, in 2001, Senator Richard Shelby and Congressman Spencer Bachus secured $60 million to buy right of-way and do preliminary engineering for the route. In 2003, Shelby secured an additional $2 million for the continued purchasing of right-of-way. Progress continued with the purchasing of additional right-of-way through the county as of 2006. In May 2009, Bachus announced in the Birmingham News that the Northern Beltline had been designated as I-422.

Construction started on a 1.34-mile (2.16 km) section north of Pinson on February 24, 2014, which will connect State Route 79 (SR 79) near White Oaks to SR 75 near Palmerdale. This section is budgeted to cost $46 million and was expected to be completed by fall 2016. However, it was held up by local opposition and a lack of funding forced the project to be put on hold in fall 2016. Construction was expected to resume in 2019, but this did not happen. On April 12, 2023, Alabama Governor Kay Ivey announced that $489 million in federal funding had been secured to resume construction that spring. The funding will cover five years for construction of the original segment along with an extension westward beyond SR 79 to US 31 for a total of 10 miles (16 km). However, construction of this segment of the interstate, which will be four lanes, was delayed again and ALDOT did not expect to break ground on the resumption of the project until November 2023. There were no new announcements made on the project until late-June 2024, when ALDOT announced that they had finally resumed construction on the initial phase between SR 75 and SR 79 in late-June 2024; this phase was opened on September 29, 2026. The FHA now estimates that the construction of the interstate in its entirety will cost $5.44 billion (an average of over $100 million per mile of road); the original estimate was $3.4 billion.

I-65, I-59, and I-459 in the Birmingham metro are expected to be widened or reconstructed to accommodate the increase in traffic that will come from the construction of I-422.

== Controversy ==
The construction of the Northern Beltline has significant opposition from local communities and local conservation groups. Environmental groups filed lawsuits in 2011 and 2013 to block construction of the beltline in federal court. The groups cited the project's environmental and economic impact in their filing. The groups' request for preliminary injunction to stop construction was blocked in January 2014. The Northern Beltline is to cross Black Warrior and Cahaba river tributaries in 90 places, including two major sources of drinking water, and could affect 35 wetland areas once constructed. Some groups, such as OCHS, claim that the Beltline could increase traffic congestion on I-59. In late-June 2023, the Southern Environmental Law Center filed a complaint to ALDOT on the project on behalf of the Black Warrior Riverkeeper. The complaint said the project will impact Birmingham’s drinking water and that the money being spent on this project could be used in better ways across the state claiming that the northern beltline project has been ranked one of the seven worst projects in terms of wasting taxpayer money. Recent polling has shown that 74% of Birmingham civic and business leaders support the project, but only 54% of the respondents believe that ADOT can complete it by 2050. Recent planning reports from ALDOT indicate that construction on some segments may not begin until 2070.

The 52-mile-long (84 km) project was budgeted to cost $5.445 billion, making it the most expensive road project in Alabama history. At $104.7 million per mile ($65.1 million per kilometer), this budget also makes the Northern Beltline one of the most expensive roads per mile built in the US. This cost does not include the cost of extending sewer services, powerlines, and other needed infrastructure where beltline is to be constructed. In 2010, a study estimated 69,535 jobs could be created by the beltline. A later study projected that 2,805 jobs could be added in the area by 2048.

== Exit list ==
The entire route is in Jefferson County.

Location	mi	km	Exit	Destinations	Notes
Bessemer			0A-B	I-459 north I-20 / I-59 – Birmingham, Tuscaloosa, Meridian	Proposed southern terminus; southern terminus of I-459
McAdory			4	CR 36 (Johns Road)	Proposed interchanges
Hueytown			7	15th Street Road / Virginia Drive	Proposed interchanges
Hueytown			9	CR 46 (Warrior River Road)	Proposed interchanges
Sylvan Springs			13	SR 269 (Birmingport Road)	Proposed interchanges
Graysville			21	US 78 / SR 5 (Adamsville Parkway)	Proposed interchanges
Brookside			26	I-222 south to I-22	Proposed interchanges
Mount Olive			29	CR 77 (New Found Road) / CR 112 (Brookside Mt. Olive Road)	Proposed interchanges
			32	I-65 – Birmingham, Montgomery, Huntsville, Decatur	Proposed interchanges
			33	US 31 (Decatur Highway / SR 3) – Morris, Gardendale	Future interchanges (funded, to be completed by 2032)
			36	CR 129 (Glenwood Road)	Future interchanges (funded, to be completed by 2032)
			41	SR 79 (New Bradford Highway)	Opened on September 29, 2026
			43	SR 75 – Pinson	Opened on September 29, 2026
Clay			48	CR 30 (Old Springville Road) – Clay	Proposed interchange
			52A-B	I-59 – Birmingham, Gadsden	Future northern terminus
1.000 mi = 1.609 km; 1.000 km = 0.621 mi: Unopened
