= Cleveland, Alabama =

- Town
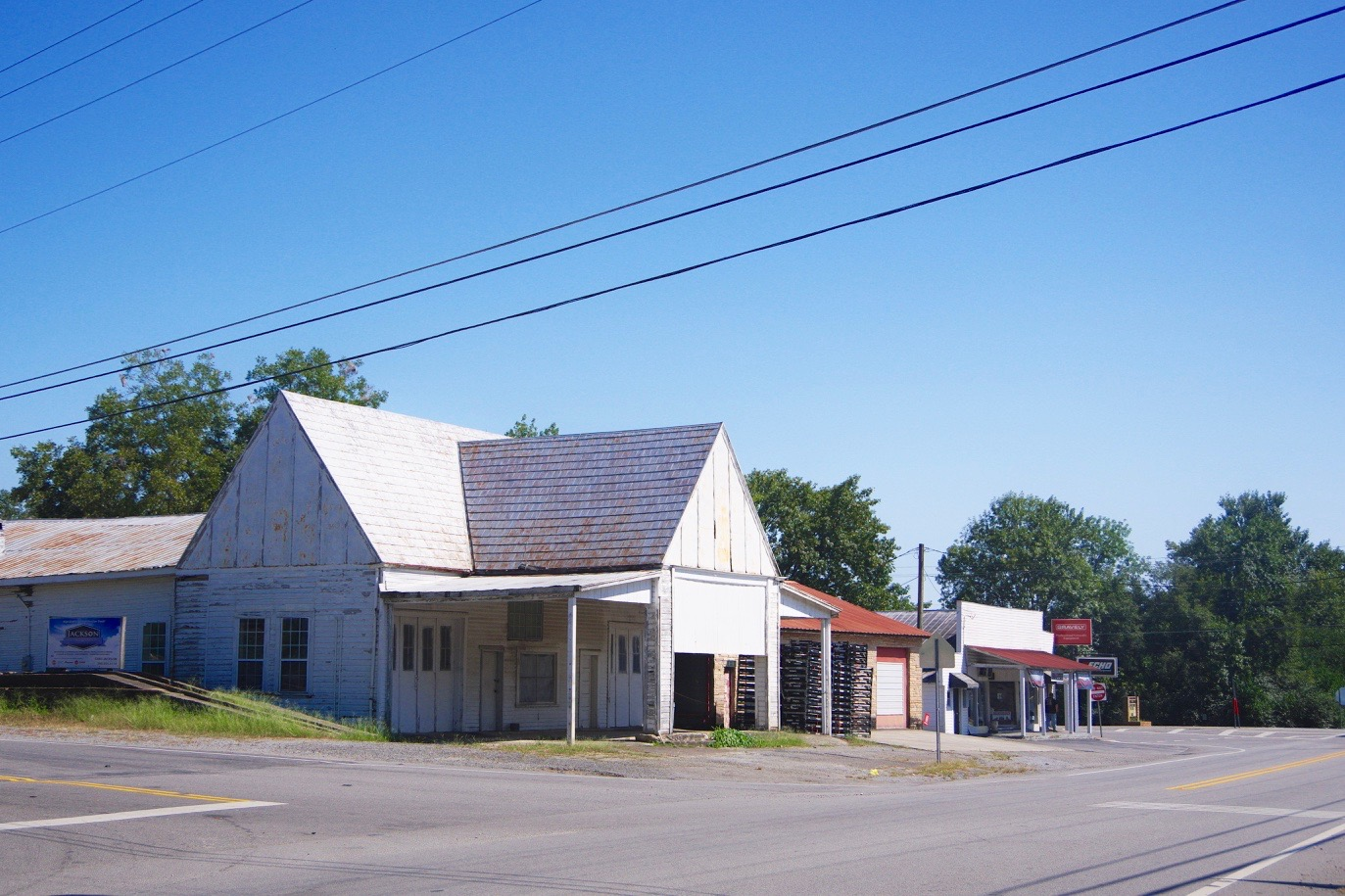
- View along U.S. Route 231 in Cleveland

- Seal

- Location of Cleveland in Blount County, Alabama.
- Coordinates: 34°00′18″N 86°33′58″W
- Country: United States
- State: Alabama
- County: Blount

Government
  - Type: Town Hall
  - Mayor: James Sullivan

Area
  - Total: 7.88 sq mi (20.42 km^{2})
  - Land: 7.85 sq mi (20.33 km^{2})
  - Water: 0.035 sq mi (0.09 km^{2})
- Elevation: 522 ft (159 m)

Population (2020)
  - Total: 1,245
  - Density: 158.6/sq mi (61.23/km^{2})
- Time zone: UTC-6 (Central (CST))
  - Summer (DST): UTC-5 (CDT)
- ZIP code: 35049
- Area codes: 205, 659
- FIPS code: 01-15472
- GNIS feature ID: 2406278
- Website: clevelandal.gov

Cleveland is a town in Blount County, Alabama, United States. At the 2020 census, the population was 1,245.

== History ==
Cleveland was settled in the 1820s, and had grown into a small community by the early 1880s. It was initially known as Dry Creek Crossroads, and afterward as Blackwood's Crossroads, after local entrepreneur John Blackwood. When a post office was established in the community, it was named in honor of President Grover Cleveland. The town incorporated in 1964.

== Geography ==
Cleveland is located in central Blount County. The Locust Fork of the Black Warrior River flows past the northwest side of the town. The National Register-listed Swann Covered Bridge, which spans the river, lies just west of Cleveland. U.S. Route 231 intersects Alabama State Route 79 north of the center of town. Route 231 leads southeast 7 miles (11 km) to Oneonta, the county seat, and north 56 miles (90 km) to Huntsville. Route 79 leads northeast 31 miles (50 km) to Guntersville and southwest 37 miles (60 km) to Birmingham.

According to the U.S. Census Bureau, the town has a total area of 7.9 square miles (20.4 km^{2}), of which 7.8 square miles (20.3 km^{2}) is land and 0.039 square miles (0.1 km^{2}), or 0.64%, is water.

== Demographics ==
Historical population
Census	Pop.	Note	%±
1970	413		—
1980	487		17.9%
1990	739		51.7%
2000	1,241		67.9%
2010	1,303		5.0%
2020	1,245		−4.5%
U.S. Decennial Census; 2013 Estimate

=== 2020 census ===
As of the 2020 census, Cleveland had a population of 1,245. The median age was 38.7 years. 24.0% of residents were under the age of 18 and 19.2% of residents were 65 years of age or older. For every 100 females there were 95.8 males, and for every 100 females age 18 and over there were 95.1 males age 18 and over.

0.0% of residents lived in urban areas, while 100.0% lived in rural areas.

There were 490 households and 360 families in Cleveland, of which 37.6% had children under the age of 18 living in them. Of all households, 55.9% were married-couple households, 19.0% were households with a male householder and no spouse or partner present, and 20.6% were households with a female householder and no spouse or partner present. About 26.4% of all households were made up of individuals and 13.3% had someone living alone who was 65 years of age or older.

There were 531 housing units, of which 7.7% were vacant. The homeowner vacancy rate was 1.7% and the rental vacancy rate was 16.7%.

Cleveland racial composition
Race	Num.	Perc.
White (non-Hispanic)	901	72.37%
Black or African American (non-Hispanic)	4	0.32%
Native American	1	0.08%
Asian	7	0.56%
Other/Mixed	37	2.97%
Hispanic or Latino	295	23.69%

=== 2010 census ===
As of the census of 2010, there were 1,303 people, 464 households, and 358 families residing in the town. The population density was 166 inhabitants per square mile (64/km^{2}). There were 504 housing units at an average density of 63.8 per square mile (24.6/km^{2}). The racial makeup of the town was 89.2% White, 0.3% Black or African American, 0.2% Native American, 8.6% from other races, and 1.4% from two or more races. 18.4% of the population were Hispanic or Latino of any race.

There were 464 households, out of which 35.6% had children under the age of 18 living with them, 62.5% were married couples living together, 10.1% had a female householder with no husband present, and 22.8% were non-families. 20.5% of all households were made up of individuals, and 11.5% had someone living alone who was 65 years of age or older. The average household size was 2.79 and the average family size was 3.23.

In the town, the population was spread out, with 26.0% under the age of 18, 8.4% from 18 to 24, 28.0% from 25 to 44, 25.1% from 45 to 64, and 13.7% who were 65 years of age or older. The median age was 36.8 years. For every 100 females, there were 94.2 males. For every 100 females age 18 and over, there were 105.5 males.

The median income for a household in the town was $46,786, and the median income for a family was $53,818. Males had a median income of $37,344 versus $25,313 for females. The per capita income for the town was $18,250. About 11.1% of families and 15.5% of the population were below the poverty line, including 27.6% of those under age 18 and 12.7% of those age 65 or over.

== Notable person ==
- Kevin Sherrer, college football player at Alabama and NFL football coach
