= Oneonta, Alabama =

Oneonta
- City
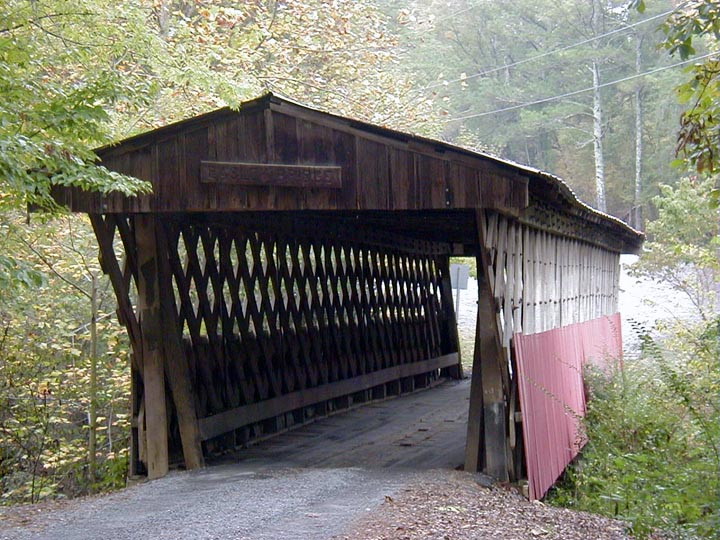
- Oneonta is home to the Easley Covered Bridge, a county-owned, 95-foot (29 m) town lattice truss bridge built in 1927. Its WGCB number is 01-05-12.

- Flag Logo
- Motto: A Small City with Big Ideas
- Location of Oneonta in Blount County, Alabama
- Coordinates: 33°55′16″N 86°31′30″W
- Country: United States
- State: Alabama
- County: Blount

Government
  - Type: Council

Area
  - Total: 15.88 sq mi (41.14 km^{2})
  - Land: 15.83 sq mi (40.99 km^{2})
  - Water: 0.054 sq mi (0.14 km^{2})
- Elevation: 860 ft (260 m)

Population (2020)
  - Total: 6,938
  - Density: 438.4/sq mi (169.25/km^{2})
- Time zone: UTC−6 (Central (CST))
  - Summer (DST): UTC−5 (CDT)
- ZIP code: 35121
- Area code: 205, 659
- FIPS code: 01-57000
- GNIS feature ID: 2404433
- Website: www.cityofoneonta.us

Oneonta (/ˌɒniˈɒnɒ/) is a city in Blount County, Alabama, United States. At the 2020 census, the population was 6,938. The city is the county seat of Blount County. Oneonta is home to the Covered Bridge Festival.

== History ==
A post office called Oneonta has been in operation since 1889. The city was named after Oneonta, New York, the native home of a railroad official. In 1889, the county seat was transferred to Oneonta from Blountsville.

During World War II, a small POW camp was operated outside of Oneonta.

== Geography ==
Oneonta is located in eastern Blount County. It is situated in Murphree Valley between Red Mountain and Sand Mountain to the northwest and Straight Mountain to the southeast.

U.S. Route 231 passes through the center of the city, leading northwest 7 miles (11 km) to Cleveland, Alabama, and southeast 14 miles (23 km) to Interstate 59 in Ashville.

According to the U.S. Census Bureau, the city has a total area of 15.3 square miles (39.5 km^{2}), of which 15.2 square miles (39.3 km^{2}) is land and 0.077 square miles (0.2 km^{2}), or 0.54%, is water.

=== Climate ===
Climate data for Oneonta, Alabama, 1991–2020 normals, extremes 1894–present
Month	Jan	Feb	Mar	Apr	May	Jun	Jul	Aug	Sep	Oct	Nov	Dec	Year
Record high °F (°C)	83 (28)	83 (28)	90 (32)	92 (33)	98 (37)	104 (40)	109 (43)	104 (40)	104 (40)	96 (36)	87 (31)	81 (27)	109 (43)
Mean maximum °F (°C)	68.6 (20.3)	72.5 (22.5)	80.3 (26.8)	84.7 (29.3)	88.6 (31.4)	94.1 (34.5)	95.7 (35.4)	96.2 (35.7)	92.9 (33.8)	86.0 (30.0)	77.8 (25.4)	70.2 (21.2)	97.5 (36.4)
Mean daily maximum °F (°C)	53.2 (11.8)	57.3 (14.1)	66.0 (18.9)	73.8 (23.2)	80.8 (27.1)	87.3 (30.7)	90.9 (32.7)	89.8 (32.1)	84.9 (29.4)	75.0 (23.9)	64.2 (17.9)	55.4 (13.0)	73.2 (22.9)
Daily mean °F (°C)	43.1 (6.2)	46.3 (7.9)	54.2 (12.3)	61.6 (16.4)	69.8 (21.0)	77.1 (25.1)	80.7 (27.1)	79.6 (26.4)	73.8 (23.2)	63.2 (17.3)	52.7 (11.5)	45.4 (7.4)	62.3 (16.8)
Mean daily minimum °F (°C)	32.9 (0.5)	35.4 (1.9)	42.4 (5.8)	49.5 (9.7)	58.7 (14.8)	66.9 (19.4)	70.4 (21.3)	69.5 (20.8)	62.7 (17.1)	51.4 (10.8)	41.2 (5.1)	35.4 (1.9)	51.4 (10.8)
Mean minimum °F (°C)	14.4 (−9.8)	17.8 (−7.9)	24.5 (−4.2)	34.4 (1.3)	43.7 (6.5)	55.6 (13.1)	62.1 (16.7)	60.1 (15.6)	47.8 (8.8)	34.4 (1.3)	24.4 (−4.2)	20.1 (−6.6)	11.9 (−11.2)
Record low °F (°C)	−9 (−23)	−15 (−26)	4 (−16)	24 (−4)	32 (0)	40 (4)	48 (9)	46 (8)	32 (0)	20 (−7)	2 (−17)	−3 (−19)	−15 (−26)
Average precipitation inches (mm)	5.49 (139)	5.51 (140)	5.09 (129)	5.64 (143)	4.19 (106)	5.24 (133)	5.04 (128)	3.61 (92)	4.09 (104)	3.40 (86)	4.23 (107)	5.84 (148)	57.37 (1,455)
Average snowfall inches (cm)	0.3 (0.76)	0.6 (1.5)	0.7 (1.8)	0.0 (0.0)	0.0 (0.0)	0.0 (0.0)	0.0 (0.0)	0.0 (0.0)	0.0 (0.0)	0.0 (0.0)	0.0 (0.0)	0.1 (0.25)	1.7 (4.31)
Average precipitation days (≥ 0.01 in)	9.0	9.5	10.0	8.1	7.5	9.6	9.5	7.9	5.8	6.3	7.4	10.2	100.8
Average snowy days (≥ 0.1 in)	0.4	0.3	0.1	0.0	0.0	0.0	0.0	0.0	0.0	0.0	0.0	0.0	0.8
Source 1: NOAA (snow/snow days 1981–2010)
Source 2: National Weather Service

== Demographics ==
Historical population
Census	Pop.	Note	%±
1900	583		—
1910	609		4.5%
1920	876		43.8%
1930	1,387		58.3%
1940	2,376		71.3%
1950	2,802		17.9%
1960	4,136		47.6%
1970	4,390		6.1%
1980	4,824		9.9%
1990	4,844		0.4%
2000	5,576		15.1%
2010	6,567		17.8%
2020	6,938		5.6%
U.S. Decennial Census

=== 2020 census ===
As of the 2020 census, Oneonta had a population of 6,938. The median age was 42.3 years. 22.1% of residents were under the age of 18 and 22.9% of residents were 65 years of age or older. For every 100 females, there were 89.4 males, and for every 100 females age 18 and over there were 84.9 males age 18 and over.

75.0% of residents lived in urban areas, while 25.0% lived in rural areas.

There were 2,622 households in Oneonta, including 1,551 families. Of all households, 31.4% had children under the age of 18 living in them, 45.1% were married-couple households, 17.8% were households with a male householder and no spouse or partner present, and 33.9% were households with a female householder and no spouse or partner present. About 32.7% of all households were made up of individuals and 16.6% had someone living alone who was 65 years of age or older.

There were 2,858 housing units, of which 8.3% were vacant. The homeowner vacancy rate was 2.1% and the rental vacancy rate was 7.0%.

Oneonta racial composition
Race	Num.	Perc.
White (non-Hispanic)	5,012	72.24%
Black or African American (non-Hispanic)	405	5.84%
Native American	11	0.16%
Asian	54	0.78%
Pacific Islander	1	0.01%
Other/Mixed	280	4.04%
Hispanic or Latino	1,175	16.94%

=== 2010 census ===
As of the census of 2010, there were 6,567 people, 2,502 households, and 1,630 families residing in the city. The population density was 433 inhabitants per square mile (167/km^{2}). There were 2,751 housing units at an average density of 179.8 per square mile (69.4/km^{2}). The racial makeup of the city was 84.1% White, 6.0% Black or African American, 0.5% Native American, 0.5% Asian, 7.6% from other races, and 1.3% from two or more races. 15.9% of the population were Hispanic or Latino of any race.

There were 2,502 households, out of which 28.4% had children under the age of 18 living with them, 49.9% were married couples living together, 11.0% had a female householder with no husband present, and 34.9% were non-families. 31.4% of all households were made up of individuals, and 15.3% had someone living alone who was 65 years of age or older. The average household size was 2.46 and the average family size was 3.11.

In the city, the age distribution of the population shows 23.0% under the age of 18, 7.8% from 18 to 24, 24.7% from 25 to 44, 23.8% from 45 to 64, and 20.7% who were 65 years of age or older. The median age was 40.5 years. For every 100 females, there were 91.0 males. For every 100 females age 18 and over, there were 101.3 males.

The median income for a household in the city was $40,192, and the median income for a family was $50,236. Males had a median income of $41,425 versus $22,160 for females. The per capita income for the city was $18,951. About 13.0% of families and 17.9% of the population were below the poverty line, including 27.2% of those under age 18 and 16.4% of those age 65 or over.

== Events and recreation ==
Oneonta, Alabama is home to the historical Covered Bridge Festival. This annual event showcases the history of the remaining covered bridges in Blount County, and includes an arts and crafts festival with entertainment and events. Also located in Oneonta is the Blount County Memorial Museum which hosts a variety of resources for genealogy research. Palisades Park features hiking trails and public campgrounds. The Oneonta Business Association sponsors the annual summertime festival known as the June Fling with over 100 booths, cruise-in, entertainment, Kidz Fun Zone, and the Singing Showdown solo vocal competition. This non-profit organization heads other projects including "Paint the Town," "Light the Town," and the Festival of Lights.

== Education ==
Public education is provided by Oneonta City School District. There are three schools in the city: Oneonta Elementary School (grades K through 5), Oneonta Middle School (grades 6 through 8), and Oneonta High School (grades 9 through 12). A branch of Wallace State Community College is also located in the town.

== Radio stations ==
- WCRL 1570 AM – Oldies (simulcasts on translator W237DH 95.3FM)

== Transportation ==
Blount County Public Transportation System provides dial-a-ride bus transit service to the city.

== Notable people ==
- Joe Gibbs — co-founder of the Golf Channel
- Osmond Ingram — sailor in the United States Navy during World War I who posthumously received the Medal of Honor
- Steve Patton — head coach of the Gardner–Webb University football team from 1997–2010
- Rusty Paul — 2nd mayor of Sandy Springs, Georgia
- Kevin Sherrer — college football player for Alabama and successful high school, college, and NFL football coach
