= List of census county divisions in Alabama =

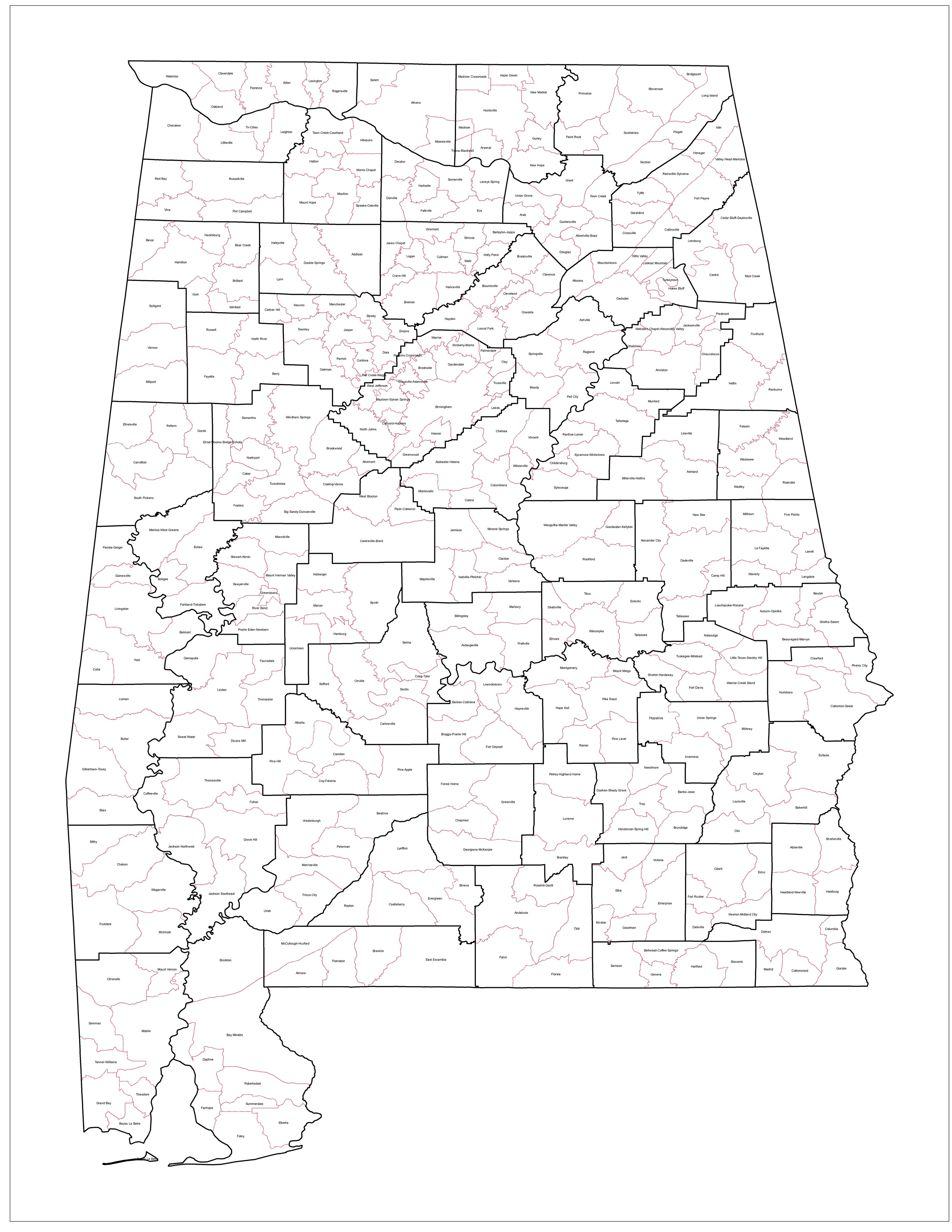
Map illustrating Alabama's census county divisions.

The State of Alabama is divided into 67 counties. All counties are further subdivided into census county divisions (CCD). A CCD is a relatively permanent statistical area delineated cooperatively by the Census Bureau and state and local government authorities. CCDs are defined in states that do not have well-defined and stable minor civil divisions (e.g., townships) that have local governmental purposes. Within Alabama are 390 census county divisions.

== A ==
- Abbeville
- Abernant
- Addison
- Alabaster-Helena
- Alberta
- Albertville-Boaz
- Alexander City
- Altoona
- Andalusia
- Anniston
- Arab
- Arsenal
- Ashland
- Ashville
- Athens
- Atmore
- Auburn-Opelika
- Autaugaville

== B ==
- Baileyton-Joppa
- Bakerhill
- Banks-Josie
- Bay Minette
- Bayou La Batre
- Bear Creek
- Beatrice
- Beauregard-Marvyn
- Bellwood-Coffee Springs
- Belmont
- Benton-Collirene
- Berry
- Beulah
- Bexar
- Big Sandy-Duncanville
- Billingsley
- Birmingham
- Blountsville
- Boligee
- Braggs-Prairie Hill
- Brantley
- Bremen
- Brewton
- Bridgeport
- Brilliant
- Brookside
- Brooksville
- Brookwood
- Brundidge
- Butler

== C ==
- Calera
- Camden
- Camp Hill
- Carbon Hill
- Carlowville
- Carrollton
- Castleberry
- Cedar Bluff-Gaylesville
- Centre
- Centreville-Brent
- Chapman
- Chatom
- Chelsea
- Cherokee
- Childersburg
- Choccolocco
- Citronelle
- Clanton
- Clarence
- Clay
- Clayton
- Cleveland
- Clio
- Cloverdale
- Coaling-Vance
- Coffeeville
- Coker
- Collinsville
- Columbia
- Columbiana
- Concord-Hopkins, also known as the Concord-Rock Creek Division
- Cordova
- Cottonton-Seale
- Cottonwood
- Coy-Fatama
- Craig-Tyler
- Crane Hill
- Crawford
- Crossville
- Cuba
- Cullman

== D ==
- Dadeville
- Daleville
- Danville
- Daphne
- Deatsville
- Decatur
- Demopolis
- Dixons Mills
- Dora
- Dothan
- Double Springs
- Douglas

== E ==
- East Escambia
- Echo
- Eclectic
- Elba
- Elberta
- Elmore
- Elrod-Moores Bridge-Echola
- Empire
- Enterprise
- Ethelsville
- Eufaula
- Eutaw
- Eva
- Evergreen

== F ==
- Fairhope
- Falco
- Falkville
- Faunsdale
- Fayette
- Fitzpatrick
- Five Points
- Flat Creek-Wegra, also known as the Quinton-Wegra Division
- Flomaton
- Florala
- Florence
- Foley
- Folsom
- Forest Home
- Forkland-Tishabee
- Fort Davis
- Fort Deposit
- Fort Novosel
- Fort Payne
- Fosters
- Frisco City
- Fruitdale
- Fruithurst
- Fulton
- Fyffe

== G ==
- Gadsden
- Gainesville
- Gardendale
- Geneva
- Georgiana-McKenzie
- Geraldine
- Gilbertown-Toxey
- Goodman
- Goodwater-Kellyton
- Gordo
- Goshen-Shady Grove
- Grand Bay
- Grant
- Graysville-Adamsville
- Greensboro
- Greenville
- Greenwood
- Grove Hill
- Guin
- Guntersville
- Gurley

== H ==
- Hackleburg
- Haleburg
- Haleyville
- Hamburg
- Hamilton
- Hanceville
- Hartford
- Hartselle
- Hatton
- Hayden
- Hayneville
- Hazel Green
- Headland-Newville
- Heflin
- Heiberger
- Henagar
- Henderson-Spring Hill
- Hillsboro
- Hokes Bluff
- Holly Pond
- Hoover
- Hope Hull
- Huntsville
- Hurtsboro

== I ==
- Ider
- Inverness
- Isabella-Pletcher

== J ==
- Jack
- Jackson Northwest, also known as the Jackson Division
- Jackson Southeast, also known as the Walker Springs Division
- Jacksonville
- Jasper
- Jemison
- Jones Chapel

== K ==
- Killen
- Kimberly-Morris
- Kinston

== L ==
- La Fayette
- Laceys Spring
- Lanett
- Langdale
- Leeds
- Leesburg
- Leighton
- Lexington
- Lincoln
- Linden
- Lineville
- Lisman
- Little Texas-Society Hill
- Littleville
- Livingston
- Loachapoka-Roxana
- Locust Fork
- Logan
- Long Island
- Lookout Mountain
- Louisville
- Lowndesboro
- Luverne
- Lyeffion
- Lynn

== M ==
- Madison
- Madison Crossroads
- Madrid
- Manchester
- Mantua-West Greene
- Maplesville
- Marbury
- Marion
- Maytown-Sylvan Springs
- McCullough-Huxford
- McIntosh
- Midway
- Millerville-Hollins
- Millport
- Millry
- Milltown
- Mineral Springs
- Mobile
- Monroeville
- Montevallo
- Montgomery
- Moody
- Mooresville
- Morris Chapel
- Moulton
- Moundville
- Mount Herman Valley, also known as the Greensboro Northeast Division
- Mount Hope
- Mount Meigs
- Mount Vernon
- Mountainboro
- Mud Creek, also known as the Spring Garden Division
- Munford

== N ==
- Nauvoo
- Needmore
- New Hope
- New Market
- New Site
- Newton-Midland City
- North Johns
- North River, also known as the Northeast Fayette Division
- Northport
- Notasulga

== O ==
- Oakland
- Oakman
- Ohatchee
- Oneonta
- Opp
- Orrville
- Ozark

== P ==
- Paint Rock
- Palmerdale
- Panola-Geiger
- Parrish
- Pell City
- Peterman
- Petrey-Highland Home
- Phenix City
- Phil Campbell
- Piedmont
- Pike Road
- Pine Apple
- Pine Hill
- Pine Level
- Piper-Coleanor
- Pisgah
- Prairie Eden-Newbern
- Prattville
- Princeton

== R ==
- Ragland
- Rainsville-Sylvania
- Ramer
- Ranburne
- Red Bay
- Reform
- Renfroe-Laniers
- Repton
- River Bend, also known as the Greensboro South Division
- Roanoke
- Robbins Crossroads
- Robertsdale
- Rockford
- Rogersville
- Rosehill-Gantt
- Russell, also known as the Winfield-Glen Allen Division
- Russellville

== S ==
- Safford
- Salem
- Samantha
- Samson
- Sardis
- Sawyerville
- Scottsboro
- Section
- Selma
- Semmes
- Shorter-Hardaway
- Shorterville
- Shreve
- Silas
- Simcoe
- Sipsey
- Slocomb
- Smiths-Salem
- Somerville
- South Pickens, also known as the Aliceville Division
- Speake-Oakville
- Springville
- Sprott
- Stevenson
- Stewart-Akron
- Stockton
- Sulligent
- Summerdale
- Sweet Water
- Sycamore-Winterboro
- Sylacauga

== T ==
- Talladega
- Tallassee
- Tanner Williams
- Theodore
- Thomaston
- Thomasville
- Titus
- Town Creek
- Town Creek-Courtland
- Townley
- Triana, also known as Triana-Blackwall Division
- Tri-Cities
- Troy
- Trussville
- Turkeytown
- Tuscaloosa
- Tuskegee-Milstead

== U ==
- Union Grove
- Union Springs
- Uniontown
- Uriah

== V ==
- Valley Head-Mentone
- Verbena
- Vernon
- Victoria
- Vina
- Vincent
- Vinemont
- Vredenburgh

== W ==
- Wadley
- Wagarville
- Warrior
- Warrior-Creek Stand
- Waterloo
- Waverly
- Websters Chapel-Alexandria Valley
- Wedowee
- Welti
- Weogufka-Marble Valley
- West Blocton
- West Jefferson
- Wetumpka
- Wills Valley
- Wilsonville
- Windham Springs
- Winfield
- Woodland

== Y ==
- York
