= Edgewater, Alabama =

- CDP
- Location in Jefferson County and the state of Alabama
- Coordinates: 33°31′43″N 86°57′26″W
- Country: United States
- State: Alabama
- County: Jefferson

Area
  - Total: 1.19 sq mi (3.07 km^{2})
  - Land: 1.16 sq mi (3.00 km^{2})
  - Water: 0.023 sq mi (0.06 km^{2})
- Elevation: 558 ft (170 m)

Population (2020)
  - Total: 746
  - Density: 643.1/sq mi (248.29/km^{2})
- Time zone: UTC-6 (Central (CST))
  - Summer (DST): UTC-5 (CDT)
- ZIP code: 35224
- Area codes: 205 and 659
- FIPS code: 01-23032
- GNIS feature ID: 2402443

Edgewater is a census-designated place in Jefferson County, Alabama, United States. It is northeast from the Birmingham suburb of Pleasant Grove. As of the 2020 census, Edgewater had a population of 746. This area was damaged by tornadoes on April 15, 1956 and April 8, 1998. The 1998 tornado was rated F5 on the Fujita scale.

== History ==
Edgewater was originally built as a company town by Tennessee Coal, Iron and Railroad Company.

== Geography ==
According to the U.S. Census Bureau, the CDP has a total area of 1.2 square miles (3.1 km^{2}), of which 1.2 square miles (3.1 km^{2}) is land and 0.04 square miles (0.10 km^{2}) (1.67%) is water.

== Demographics ==
Historical population
Census	Pop.	Note	%±
1950	1,984		—
2000	730		—
2010	883		21.0%
2020	746		−15.5%
U.S. Decennial Census

Edgewater was initially listed on the 1950 U.S. Census as an unincorporated community. It did not appear again until 2000 when it was designated a census designated place created out of part of the Minor CDP.

=== 2020 census ===
Edgewater CDP, Alabama – Racial and ethnic composition Note: the US Census treats Hispanic/Latino as an ethnic category. This table excludes Latinos from the racial categories and assigns them to a separate category. Hispanics/Latinos may be of any race.
Race / Ethnicity (NH = Non-Hispanic)	Pop 2000	Pop 2010	Pop 2020	% 2000	% 2010	% 2020
White alone (NH)	277	270	182	37.95%	30.58%	24.40%
Black or African American alone (NH)	438	603	519	60.00%	68.29%	69.57%
Native American or Alaska Native alone (NH)	0	1	1	0.00%	0.11%	0.13%
Asian alone (NH)	0	0	3	0.00%	0.00%	0.40%
Native Hawaiian or Pacific Islander alone (NH)	0	0	0	0.00%	0.00%	0.00%
Other race alone (NH)	1	0	1	0.14%	0.00%	0.13%
Mixed race or Multiracial (NH)	6	0	20	0.82%	0.00%	2.68%
Hispanic or Latino (any race)	8	9	20	1.10%	1.02%	2.68%
Total	730	883	746	100.00%	100.00%	100.00%

As of the 2020 United States census, there were 746 people, 253 households, and 214 families residing in the CDP.

=== 2000 census ===
As of the census of 2000, there were 730 people, 295 households, and 192 families residing in the CDP. The population density was 622.3 inhabitants per square mile (240.3/km^{2}). There were 323 housing units at an average density of 275.3 per square mile (106.3/km^{2}). The racial makeup of the CDP was 37.95% White, 61.10% Black or African American, 0.14% from other races, and 0.82% from two or more races. 1.10% of the population were Hispanic or Latino of any race.

There were 295 households, out of which 25.1% had children under the age of 18 living with them, 34.6% were married couples living together, 24.1% had a female householder with no husband present, and 34.6% were non-families. 31.9% of all households were made up of individuals, and 14.9% had someone living alone who was 65 years of age or older. The average household size was 2.47 and the average family size was 3.12.

In the CDP, the population was spread out, with 22.5% under the age of 18, 7.4% from 18 to 24, 25.2% from 25 to 44, 27.8% from 45 to 64, and 17.1% who were 65 years of age or older. The median age was 42 years. For every 100 females, there were 97.3 males. For every 100 females age 18 and over, there were 85.6 males.

The median income for a household in the CDP was $21,322, and the median income for a family was $47,240. Males had a median income of $26,786 versus $20,962 for females. The per capita income for the CDP was $14,240. About 2.5% of families and 10.2% of the population were below the poverty line, including 9.3% of those under age 18 and 14.4% of those age 65 or over.

== Notable people ==
- Sam Frazier Jr., blues singer, songwriter, guitar and harmonica player
- Mule Suttles, Negro league baseball player and member of the Baseball Hall of Fame
