= McDonald Chapel, Alabama =

- CDP
- Location in Jefferson County and the state of Alabama
- Coordinates: 33°31′08″N 86°56′19″W
- Country: United States
- State: Alabama
- County: Jefferson

Area
  - Total: 1.07 sq mi (2.77 km^{2})
  - Land: 1.07 sq mi (2.76 km^{2})
  - Water: 0.0039 sq mi (0.01 km^{2})
- Elevation: 591 ft (180 m)

Population (2020)
  - Total: 739
  - Density: 694.6/sq mi (268.18/km^{2})
- Time zone: UTC-6 (Central (CST))
  - Summer (DST): UTC-5 (CDT)
- FIPS code: 01-45208
- GNIS feature ID: 2403268

McDonald Chapel is a census-designated place in Jefferson County, Alabama, United States. It is northeast of the Birmingham suburb of Pleasant Grove. At the 2020 census, the population was 739. Large portions of this area were damaged by violent tornadoes in 1956, 1977, 1998, and 2011. The 1977 and 1998 tornadoes were rated F5 on the Fujita scale.

== Geography ==
According to the U.S. Census Bureau, the CDP has a total area of 1.1 square miles (2.8 km^{2}), all land.

== Demographics ==
Historical population
Census	Pop.	Note	%±
2000	1,054		—
2010	717		−32.0%
2020	739		3.1%
U.S. Decennial Census

McDonald Chapel first appeared as a census designated place in the 2000 U.S. Census formed out of a portion of the Minor CDP.

=== 2020 census ===
McDonald Chapel CDP, Alabama – Racial and ethnic composition Note: the US Census treats Hispanic/Latino as an ethnic category. This table excludes Latinos from the racial categories and assigns them to a separate category. Hispanics/Latinos may be of any race.
Race / Ethnicity (NH = Non-Hispanic)	Pop 2000	Pop 2010	Pop 2020	% 2000	% 2010	% 2020
White alone (NH)	699	393	237	66.32%	54.81%	32.07%
Black or African American alone (NH)	312	282	352	29.60%	39.33%	47.63%
Native American or Alaska Native alone (NH)	1	0	0	0.09%	0.00%	0.00%
Asian alone (NH)	28	4	14	2.66%	0.56%	1.89%
Native Hawaiian or Pacific Islander alone (NH)	0	0	0	0.00%	0.00%	0.00%
Other race alone (NH)	2	1	6	0.19%	0.14%	0.81%
Mixed race or Multiracial (NH)	6	17	24	0.57%	2.37%	2.84%
Hispanic or Latino (any race)	6	20	109	0.57%	2.79%	14.75%
Total	1,054	717	739	100.00%	100.00%	100.00%

As of the 2020 United States census, there were 739 people, 224 households, and 123 families residing in the CDP.

=== 2000 census ===
As of the census of 2000, there were 1,054 people, 397 households, and 289 families residing in the CDP. The population density was 971.5 inhabitants per square mile (375.1/km^{2}). There were 448 housing units at an average density of 413.0 per square mile (159.5/km^{2}). The racial makeup of the CDP was 66.60% White, 29.60% Black or African American, 0.09% Native American, 2.66% Asian, 0.38% from other races, and 0.66% from two or more races. 0.57% of the population were Hispanic or Latino of any race.

There were 397 households, out of which 24.7% had children under the age of 18 living with them, 51.4% were married couples living together, 15.1% had a female householder with no husband present, and 27.2% were non-families. 23.7% of all households were made up of individuals, and 12.3% had someone living alone who was 65 years of age or older. The average household size was 2.65 and the average family size was 3.16.

In the CDP, the population was spread out, with 23.1% under the age of 18, 7.6% from 18 to 24, 27.5% from 25 to 44, 23.9% from 45 to 64, and 17.8% who were 65 years of age or older. The median age was 40 years. For every 100 females, there were 98.5 males. For every 100 females age 18 and over, there were 90.1 males.

The median income for a household in the CDP was $26,188, and the median income for a family was $31,875. Males had a median income of $30,238 versus $22,917 for females. The per capita income for the CDP was $13,411. About 6.8% of families and 10.3% of the population were below the poverty line, including 33.8% of those under age 18 and none of those age 65 or over.
