= 1956 McDonald Chapel tornado =

Weather event in Alabama, United States

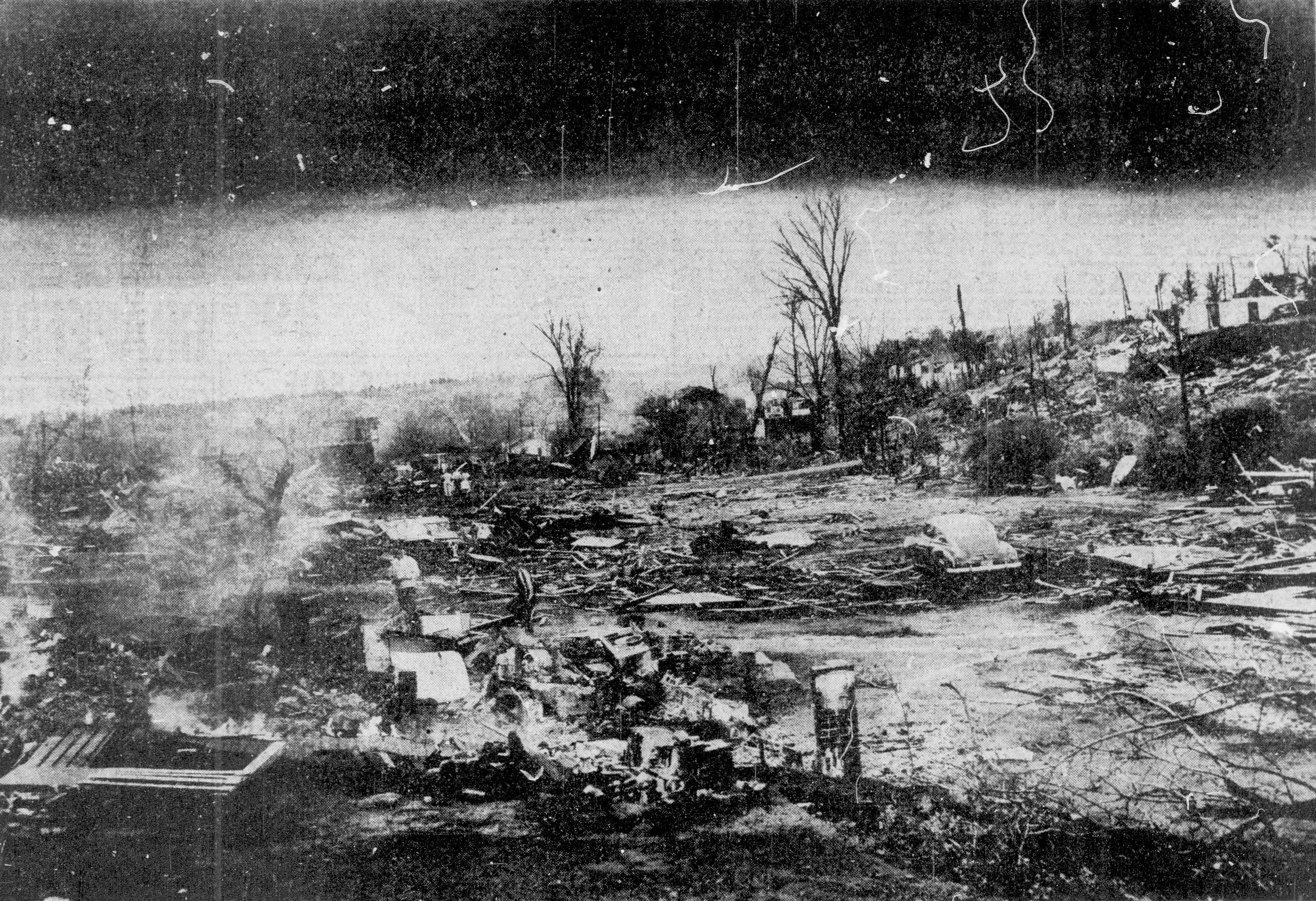
- A view of McDonald Chapel following the tornado

Meteorological history
- Date: April 15, 1956
- Formed: April 15, 1956 , 3:00 p.m. CDT (UTC−05:00)
- Dissipated: Unknown

F4 tornado
- on the Fujita scale
- Highest winds: 210–250 mph (340–400 km/h)

Overall effects
- Fatalities: 25
- Injuries: 200
- Damage: $1.5 million (1956 USD)
- Areas affected: Jefferson County, Alabama
- Part of the tornadoes of 1956

The 1956 McDonald Chapel tornado was a deadly tornado that struck the Greater Birmingham area in Jefferson County, Alabama, with damage most severe in McDonald Chapel, during the afternoon hours of April 15, 1956. The tornado killed 25 people and injured 200 others. While only two known tornadoes touched down across the Southeastern United States (the other occurred in northern Georgia) on that day, the Birmingham tornado produced major devastation across areas west and north of downtown Birmingham.

== Meteorological synopsis ==
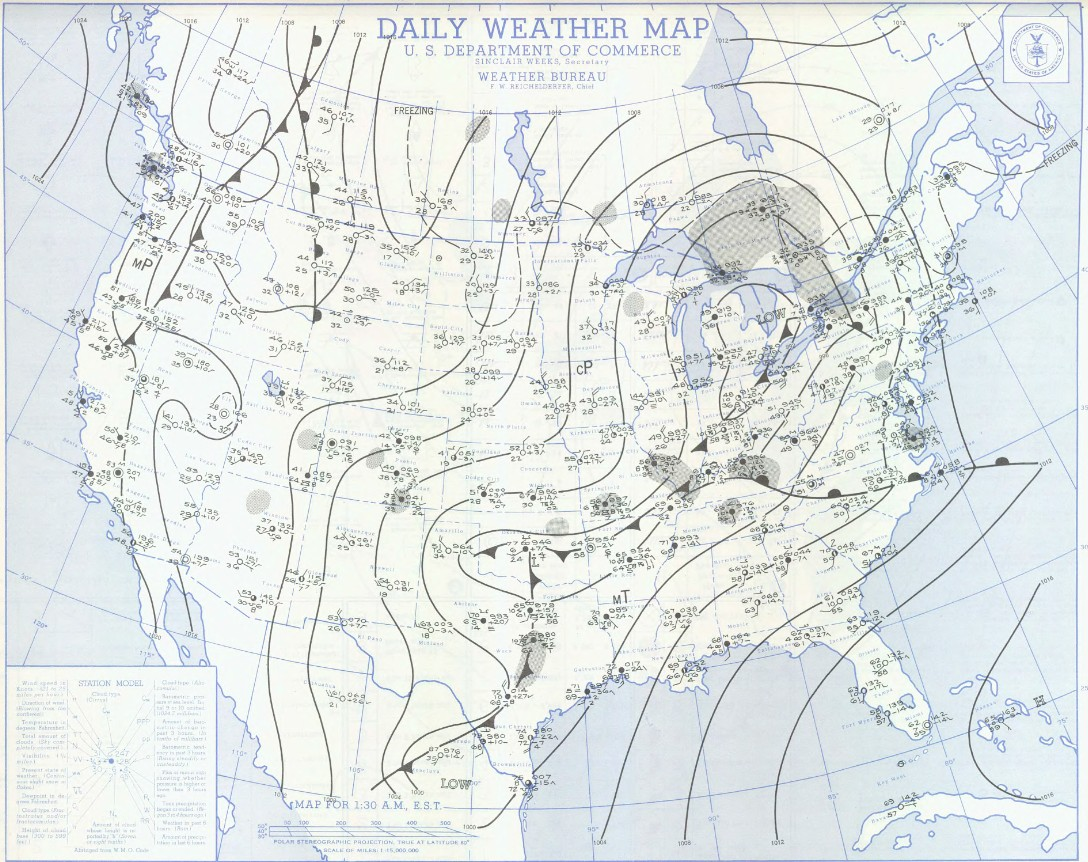
The Daily Weather Map for April 15, 1956.

At 5:15 a.m. CST on April 15, the U.S. Weather Bureau office in Birmingham, Alabama, issued a bulletin that warned of the possibility that a "tornado or two" would touch down in an area covering western Tennessee, northern Mississippi, and northern Alabama—namely, Lauderdale, Limestone, Lawrence, Colbert, and Morgan Counties, plus parts of Marion, Winston, Cullman, and Madison Counties. An update at noon local time highlighted the prospects of severe thunderstorms over west-central Alabama between 1:00–7:00 p.m. CST. Hail and gusts to 60 miles per hour (97 km/h) were expected to remain the primary hazards.

== Tornado Summary ==
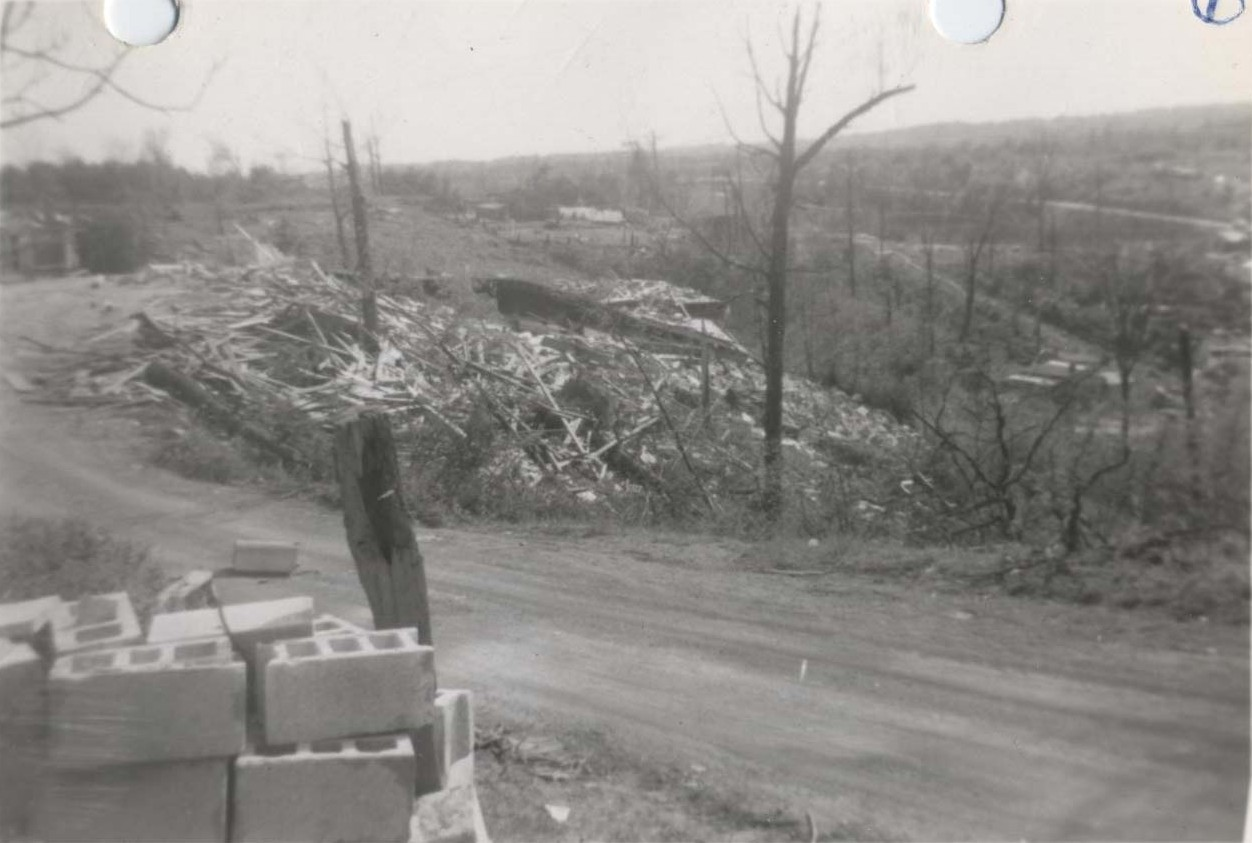
A view of damage in McDonald Chapel

The tornado started shortly before 3:00 PM CDT in Pleasant Grove, where a tornado "roar" was heard. Damage between Pleasant Grove and McDonald Chapel indicated that trees were felled in a single direction, so the damage was not listed as tornadic at first, but was considered part of the tornado in posthumous analysis. Next, the tornado struck McDonald Chapel, with a path 200 yards (183 m) wide, devastating the community. Almost total destruction occurred in a swath 150–200 yards (137–183 m) wide. As it passed through McDonald Chapel, eyewitnesses described the tornado funnel as appearing filled with fire and smoke. Many homes in McDonald Chapel were leveled, several of which were swept completely away. The most intense damage appeared to be F5 in intensity, but an F4 rating was rewarded because the homes were very poorly constructed. One of the homes reportedly had almost all of its brick foundation swept away, and a few larger homes were also leveled. The tornado continued across parts of Edgewater, Pratt City, Fultondale, Village Creek, and Tarrant before lifting northwest of Trussville, near the Jefferson-St. Clair County line. The tornado passed just one to two miles north of downtown Birmingham as well as the Birmingham-Shuttlesworth International Airport. About 400 homes across northern Jefferson County were either damaged or destroyed. Most of the 25 deaths occurred at McDonald Chapel.

== Other tornadoes ==
Confirmed tornadoes by Fujita rating
FU	F0	F1	F2	F3	F4	F5	Total
0	0	0	1	0	1	0	2

List of confirmed tornadoes – April 15, 1956
F#	Location	County	State	Time (UTC)	Path length	Damage
F2	SW of Dallas to Cumming	Paulding, Cobb, Cherokee, Forsyth	GA	2330	46.8 miles (75.3 km)	About 25 homes were damaged, and others were unroofed near Dallas and Cumming. 29 broiler houses were damaged or destroyed as well. F1 damage occurred south of Acworth and north of Woodstock. Widespread downburst activity was reported along the path.
Sources: NCDC Storm Events Database, Grazulis 1993

== Retrospective ==
The tornado event was similar to other deadly tornadoes on April 4, 1977, April 8, 1998, and April 27, 2011. The 1977 and 1998 tornadoes were rated F5, and killed 22 and 32 people, respectively, across most of the same areas that were hit in 1956. The 2011 event was rated high-end EF4, and killed 20 people in the area along with 44 others in Tuscaloosa earlier along its path. With 25 fatalities, the McDonald Chapel F4 was the deadliest tornado of 1956, surpassing the Grand Rapids F5 that killed 18 people on April 3.

== See also ==
- List of North American tornadoes and tornado outbreaks
