= Watson, Alabama =

Unincorporated community in Alabama, United States

- Unincorporated community
- Location within Alabama Location within the United States
- Coordinates: 33°38′01″N 86°52′46″W
- Country: United States
- State: Alabama
- County: Jefferson
- Elevation: 548 ft (167 m)
- Time zone: UTC-6 (Central (CST))
  - Summer (DST): UTC-5 (CDT)
- ZIP code: 35181
- Area codes: 205, 659
- GNIS feature ID: 157222

Watson, also known as Mineral Springs, is an unincorporated community in Jefferson County, Alabama, United States. The community is bordered by Brookside on the north and west, by Birmingham and Gardendale on the east and by Birmingham on the south. A post office first opened in Watson in 1903.
