= Minor, Alabama =

- CDP
- Location in Jefferson County and the state of Alabama
- Coordinates: 33°32′20″N 86°56′24″W
- Country: United States
- State: Alabama
- County: Jefferson

Area
  - Total: 0.66 sq mi (1.72 km^{2})
  - Land: 0.66 sq mi (1.72 km^{2})
  - Water: 0 sq mi (0.00 km^{2})
- Elevation: 574 ft (175 m)

Population (2020)
  - Total: 1,088
  - Density: 1,639.0/sq mi (632.82/km^{2})
- Time zone: UTC-6 (Central (CST))
  - Summer (DST): UTC-5 (CDT)
- ZIP code: 35224
- Area code: 205
- FIPS code: 01-49072
- GNIS feature ID: 2403295

Minor is a census-designated place (CDP) in Jefferson County, Alabama, United States. It is located north of the Birmingham suburb, Pleasant Grove, and as of the 2020 census had a population of 1,088. Minor was damaged by an F5 tornado on April 8, 1998, including damage inflicted on the non-denominational Open Door Church.

== Demographics ==
Historical population
Census	Pop.	Note	%±
1990	3,313		—
2000	1,116		−66.3%
2010	1,094		−2.0%
2020	1,088		−0.5%
U.S. Decennial Census

Prior to the 2000 U.S. Census, the McDonald Chapel CDP and the Edgewater CDP were carved out from its area.

=== Racial and ethnic composition ===
Minor CDP, Alabama – Racial and ethnic composition Note: the US Census treats Hispanic/Latino as an ethnic category. This table excludes Latinos from the racial categories and assigns them to a separate category. Hispanics/Latinos may be of any race.
Race / Ethnicity (NH = Non-Hispanic)	Pop 2000	Pop 2010	Pop 2020	% 2000	% 2010	% 2020
White alone (NH)	1,086	840	594	97.31%	76.78%	54.60%
Black or African American alone (NH)	10	229	357	0.90%	20.93%	32.81%
Native American or Alaska Native alone (NH)	8	3	5	0.72%	0.27%	0.46%
Asian alone (NH)	1	0	4	0.09%	0.00%	0.37%
Native Hawaiian or Pacific Islander alone (NH)	0	0	0	0.00%	0.00%	0.00%
Other race alone (NH)	0	1	3	0.00%	0.09%	0.28%
Mixed race or Multiracial (NH)	7	5	52	0.63%	0.46%	4.78%
Hispanic or Latino (any race)	4	16	73	0.36%	1.46%	6.71%
Total	1,116	1,094	1,088	100.00%	100.00%	100.00%

=== 2020 census ===
As of the 2020 census, Minor had a population of 1,088. The median age was 40.0 years. 22.7% of residents were under the age of 18 and 17.6% of residents were 65 years of age or older. For every 100 females there were 88.6 males, and for every 100 females age 18 and over there were 92.9 males age 18 and over.

98.9% of residents lived in urban areas, while 1.1% lived in rural areas.

There were 400 households in Minor, of which 24.3% had children under the age of 18 living in them. Of all households, 41.3% were married-couple households, 22.8% were households with a male householder and no spouse or partner present, and 30.8% were households with a female householder and no spouse or partner present. About 29.0% of all households were made up of individuals and 15.8% had someone living alone who was 65 years of age or older.

There were 459 housing units, of which 12.9% were vacant. The homeowner vacancy rate was 1.4% and the rental vacancy rate was 11.6%.

=== 2010 census ===
As of the 2010 census, there were 1,094 people, 405 households, and 294 families residing in the CDP. The population density was 1,600 inhabitants per square mile (620/km^{2}). Housing units numbered 462 at an average density of 660 per square mile (250/km^{2}). The racial makeup of the CDP was 77.6% White, 20.9% Black or African American, 0.3% Native American, 0.0% Asian, and 0.5% from two or more races. 1.5% of the population were Hispanic or Latino of any race.

27.2% of households had children under the age of 18 living with them, 52.8% were married couples living together, 14.3% had a female householder with no husband present, and 27.4% were non-families. 23.0% of all households were made up of individuals, and 10.6% had someone living alone who was 65 years of age or older. The average household size was 2.70 and the average family size was 3.13.

23.1% were under age 18, 6.9% were from 18 to 24, 27.6% from 25 to 44, 25.4% from 45 to 64, and 16.9% 65 or older. The median age was 39.8. For every 100 females, there were 95.4 males. For every 100 females age 18 and over, there were 106.3 males.

Median household income was $49,583, while median family income was $57,955. Males had a median income of $38,438 versus $27,011 for females. Per capita income was $24,406. About 16.0% of families and 18.3% of the population were below the poverty line, including 18.3% of those under age 18 and 0% of those age 65 or over.

=== 2000 census ===
According to the 2000 census, the population numbered 1,116 people, 456 households, and 340 families. The population density was 1,607.3 inhabitants per square mile (620.6/km^{2}). The 471 housing units produced an average density of 678.3 per square mile (261.9/km^{2}). The racial makeup of the CDP was 97.67% White, 0.90% Black or African American, 0.72% Native American, 0.09% Asian, and 0.63% from two or more races. 0.36% of the population were Hispanic or Latino of any race.

Out of the 456 households, 6.1% had children under the age of 18 living with them, 65.1% were married couples living together, 7.9% had a female householder with no husband present, and 25.4% were non-families. 23.0% of all households were made up of individuals, and 13.6% had someone living alone who was 65 years of age or older. The average household size was 2.45 and the average family size was 2.87.

The population was spread out, with 20.7% under the age of 18, 9.3% from 18 to 24, 26.2% from 25 to 44, 21.4% from 45 to 64, and 22.4% who were 65 years of age or older. The median age was 40 years. For every 100 females, there were 92.4 males. For every 100 females age 18 and over, there were 91.1 males.

The median household income was $33,710, and the median income for a family was $38,250. Males had a median income of $28,295 versus $24,042 for females. The per capita income was $14,690. About 2.0% of families and 1.6% of the population were below the poverty line, including none of those under age 18 and 8.2% of those age 65 or over.

== Churches ==
- Minor First Baptist
- Minor United Methodist, on land donated by the Young family
- Westmont Baptist
- Minor church of Christ
- Open Door, located on Birmingport Road and later partially operating out of the old Minor Christian School and later the old Methodist Church location
- Minor church of God (formerly Docena church of God)
