= Maytown, Alabama =

- Town
- Location of Maytown in Jefferson County, Alabama.
- Coordinates: 33°33′04″N 86°59′52″W
- Country: United States
- State: Alabama
- County: Jefferson

Area
  - Total: 2.73 sq mi (7.06 km^{2})
  - Land: 2.73 sq mi (7.06 km^{2})
  - Water: 0 sq mi (0.00 km^{2})
- Elevation: 541 ft (165 m)

Population (2020)
  - Total: 316
  - Density: 116.0/sq mi (44.78/km^{2})
- Time zone: UTC-6 (Central (CST))
  - Summer (DST): UTC-5 (CDT)
- ZIP code: 35118
- Area codes: 205 & 659
- FIPS code: 01-47728
- GNIS feature ID: 2406119

Maytown is a town in Jefferson County, Alabama, United States. It is northwest from the Birmingham suburb of Pleasant Grove. It incorporated in October 1956. As of the 2020 census, Maytown had a population of 316. This area was damaged by an F5 tornado on April 8, 1998.

== Geography ==
According to the U.S. Census Bureau, the town has a total area of 2.7 square miles (7.0 km^{2}), all land.

== Demographics ==
Historical population
Census	Pop.	Note	%±
1960	297		—
1970	667		124.6%
1980	538		−19.3%
1990	651		21.0%
2000	435		−33.2%
2010	385		−11.5%
2020	316		−17.9%
U.S. Decennial Census; 2013 Estimate

=== 2020 census ===
Maytown town, Alabama – Racial and ethnic composition Note: the US Census treats Hispanic/Latino as an ethnic category. This table excludes Latinos from the racial categories and assigns them to a separate category. Hispanics/Latinos may be of any race.
Race / Ethnicity (NH = Non-Hispanic)	Pop 2000	Pop 2010	Pop 2020	% 2000	% 2010	% 2020
White alone (NH)	345	344	260	79.31%	89.35%	82.28%
Black or African American alone (NH)	83	37	30	19.08%	9.61%	9.49%
Native American or Alaska Native alone (NH)	3	1	0	0.69%	0.26%	0.00%
Asian alone (NH)	1	0	0	0.23%	0.00%	0.00%
Native Hawaiian or Pacific Islander alone (NH)	0	0	0	0.00%	0.00%	0.00%
Other race alone (NH)	0	0	1	0.00%	0.00%	0.32%
Mixed race or Multiracial (NH)	3	3	14	0.69%	0.78%	4.43%
Hispanic or Latino (any race)	0	0	11	0.00%	0.00%	3.48%
Total	435	385	316	100.00%	100.00%	100.00%

As of the 2020 United States census, there were 316 people, 133 households, and 86 families residing in the town.

=== 2000 census ===
As of the census of 2000, there were 435 people, 161 households, and 129 families residing in the town. The population density was 158.8 inhabitants per square mile (61.3/km^{2}). There were 176 housing units at an average density of 64.3 per square mile (24.8/km^{2}). The racial makeup of the town was 79.31% White, 19.08% Black or African American, 0.69% Native American, 0.23% Asian, and 0.69% from two or more races.

There were 161 households, out of which 26.7% had children under the age of 18 living with them, 65.2% were married couples living together, 13.7% had a female householder with no husband present, and 19.3% were non-families. 17.4% of all households were made up of individuals, and 8.1% had someone living alone who was 65 years of age or older. The average household size was 2.70 and the average family size was 3.05.

In the town, the population was spread out, with 21.8% under the age of 18, 8.5% from 18 to 24, 26.4% from 25 to 44, 28.0% from 45 to 64, and 15.2% who were 65 years of age or older. The median age was 39 years. For every 100 females, there were 95.1 males. For every 100 females age 18 and over, there were 87.8 males.

The median income for a household in the town was $42,083, and the median income for a family was $44,038. Males had a median income of $31,250 versus $22,250 for females. The per capita income for the town was $15,125. About 7.9% of families and 10.0% of the population were below the poverty line, including 15.1% of those under age 18 and 12.7% of those age 65 or over.
