= North Johns, Alabama =

- Town
- Location of North Johns in Jefferson County, Alabama.
- Coordinates: 33°22′04″N 87°06′03″W
- Country: United States
- State: Alabama
- County: Jefferson

Area
  - Total: 0.17 sq mi (0.43 km^{2})
  - Land: 0.17 sq mi (0.43 km^{2})
  - Water: 0 sq mi (0.00 km^{2})
- Elevation: 436 ft (133 m)

Population (2020)
  - Total: 127
  - Density: 770.1/sq mi (297.34/km^{2})
- Time zone: UTC-6 (Central (CST))
  - Summer (DST): UTC-5 (CDT)
- ZIP code: 35006
- Area codes: 205 & 659
- FIPS code: 01-55152
- GNIS feature ID: 2407006

North Johns is the second smallest incorporated town in Jefferson County, Alabama (after Cardiff), United States. It is located approximately eight miles southwest from the Birmingham suburb of Hueytown. North Johns was a thriving mining town at the beginning of the 20th century, when more than 2000 people lived in and around the community. It is named after a Welsh-born mining engineer, Llewellyn Johns, who opened coal mining operations throughout the area in the 1880s. At the 2020 census the population was 127, a decrease of 18 persons from 2010.

== History ==
North Johns was incorporated in July 1912, although not until 1930 did it first appear on the Census records. It was listed as Johns in that census and North Johns from 1940 to date. Its peak recorded population was in 1950 when it had 454 residents.

== Geography ==
According to the U.S. Census Bureau, the town has a total area of 0.2 square miles (0.52 km^{2}), all land.

== Demographics ==
Historical population
Census	Pop.	Note	%±
1930	344		—
1940	404		17.4%
1950	454		12.4%
1960	338		−25.6%
1970	241		−28.7%
1980	243		0.8%
1990	177		−27.2%
2000	142		−19.8%
2010	145		2.1%
2020	127		−12.4%
U.S. Decennial Census; 2013 Estimate

=== 2020 census ===
North Johns town, Alabama – Racial and ethnic composition Note: the US Census treats Hispanic/Latino as an ethnic category. This table excludes Latinos from the racial categories and assigns them to a separate category. Hispanics/Latinos may be of any race.
Race / Ethnicity (NH = Non-Hispanic)	Pop 2000	Pop 2010	Pop 2020	% 2000	% 2010	% 2020
White alone (NH)	57	72	68	40.14%	49.66%	53.54%
Black or African American alone (NH)	84	67	49	59.15%	46.21%	38.58%
Native American or Alaska Native alone (NH)	1	6	0	0.70%	4.14%	0.00%
Asian alone (NH)	0	0	0	0.00%	0.00%	0.00%
Native Hawaiian or Pacific Islander alone (NH)	0	0	1	0.00%	0.00%	0.79%
Other race alone (NH)	0	0	0	0.00%	0.00%	0.00%
Mixed race or Multiracial (NH)	0	0	2	0.00%	0.00%	1.57%
Hispanic or Latino (any race)	0	0	7	0.00%	0.00%	5.51%
Total	142	145	127	100.00%	100.00%	100.00%

At the 2020 census, there were 127 people, 64 households, and 27 families residing in the town.

=== 2000 census ===
At the 2000 census, there were 142 people, 51 households, and 37 families residing in the town. The population density was 732.3 inhabitants per square mile (282.7/km^{2}). There were 56 housing units at an average density of 288.8 per square mile (111.5/km^{2}). The racial makeup of the town was 40.14% White, 59.15% Black or African American and 0.70% Native American.

There were 51 households, out of which 29.4% had children under the age of 18 living with them, 47.1% were married couples living together, 17.6% had a female householder with no husband present, and 25.5% were non-families. 21.6% of all households were made up of individuals, and 2.0% had someone living alone who was 65 years of age or older. The average household size was 2.78 and the average family size was 3.26.

The population was evenly distributed in regard to age, with 23.2% under the age of 18, 11.3% from 18 to 24, 23.9% from 25 to 44, 23.9% from 45 to 64, and 17.6% who were 65 years of age or older. The median age was 38 years. For every 100 females, there were 94.5 males. For every 100 females age 18 and over, there were 101.9 males.

The median income for a household in the town was $23,750, and the median income for a family was $33,750. Males had a median income of $35,375 versus $7,083 for females. The per capita income for the town was $8,149. There were 23.1% of families and 31.2% of the population living below the poverty line, including 47.6% of those under 18 and 60.7% of those over 64.

== Government ==
As of 2023, the mayor of North Johns was Kenneth Lindsey.
