= Forestdale, Alabama =

Unincorporated community in Alabama, United States

- Census-designated place (CDP) & Unincorporated community
- Location in Jefferson County and the state of Alabama
- Coordinates: 33°34′16″N 86°53′10″W
- Country: United States
- State: Alabama
- County: Jefferson

Area
  - Total: 6.75 sq mi (17.48 km^{2})
  - Land: 6.75 sq mi (17.48 km^{2})
  - Water: 0 sq mi (0.00 km^{2})
- Elevation: 627 ft (191 m)

Population (2020)
  - Total: 10,409
  - Density: 1,542.7/sq mi (595.65/km^{2})
- Time zone: UTC-6 (Central (CST))
  - Summer (DST): UTC-5 (CDT)
- ZIP code: 35214
- Area codes: 205, 659
- FIPS code: 01-27088
- GNIS feature ID: 2402493

Forestdale is an unincorporated community and census-designated place (CDP) in Jefferson County, Alabama, United States. It is north of the Birmingham city neighborhood of Ensley. At the 2020 census, the population was 10,409.

== Geography ==
According to the U.S. Census Bureau, the community has a total area of 6.9 square miles (18 km^{2}), all land.

== Demographics ==
Historical population
| Census | Pop. | Note | %± |
|---|---|---|---|
| 1970 | 6,091 | | — |
| 1980 | 10,814 | | 77.5% |
| 1990 | 10,395 | | −3.9% |
| 2000 | 10,509 | | 1.1% |
| 2010 | 10,162 | | −3.3% |
| 2020 | 10,409 | | 2.4% |
U.S. Decennial Census

=== Racial and ethnic composition ===
Forestdale CDP, Alabama – Racial and ethnic composition Note: the US Census treats Hispanic/Latino as an ethnic category. This table excludes Latinos from the racial categories and assigns them to a separate category. Hispanics/Latinos may be of any race.
| Race / Ethnicity (NH = Non-Hispanic) | Pop 1980 | Pop 1990 | Pop 2000 | Pop 2010 | Pop 2020 | % 1980 | % 1990 | % 2000 | % 2010 | % 2020 |
|---|---|---|---|---|---|---|---|---|---|---|
| White alone (NH) | 9,867 | 8,461 | 5,536 | 2,632 | 1,684 | 91.24% | 81.39% | 52.68% | 25.90% | 16.18% |
| Black or African American alone (NH) | 874 | 1,870 | 4,815 | 7,244 | 8,187 | 8.08% | 17.99% | 45.82% | 71.29% | 78.65% |
| Native American or Alaska Native alone (NH) | 6 | 8 | 17 | 19 | 17 | 0.06% | 0.08% | 0.16% | 0.19% | 0.16% |
| Asian alone (NH) | 5 | 24 | 37 | 22 | 16 | 0.05% | 0.23% | 0.35% | 0.22% | 0.15% |
| Native Hawaiian or Pacific Islander alone (NH) | x | x | 0 | 0 | 1 | x | x | 0.00% | 0.00% | 0.01% |
| Other race alone (NH) | 12 | 1 | 1 | 7 | 35 | 0.11% | 0.01% | 0.01% | 0.07% | 0.34% |
| Mixed race or Multiracial (NH) | x | x | 55 | 96 | 215 | x | x | 0.52% | 0.94% | 2.07% |
| Hispanic or Latino (any race) | 50 | 31 | 48 | 142 | 254 | 0.46% | 0.30% | 0.46% | 1.40% | 2.44% |
| Total | 10,814 | 10,395 | 10,509 | 10,162 | 10,409 | 100.00% | 100.00% | 100.00% | 100.00% | 100.00% |

=== 2020 census ===
As of the 2020 census, Forestdale had a population of 10,409. The median age was 42.6 years. 20.8% of residents were under the age of 18 and 19.5% of residents were 65 years of age or older. For every 100 females, there were 86.3 males, and for every 100 females age 18 and over, there were 80.9 males.

100.0% of residents lived in urban areas, while 0.0% lived in rural areas.

There were 4,143 households in Forestdale, of which 28.9% had children under the age of 18 living in them. Of all households, 39.3% were married-couple households, 16.9% were households with a male householder and no spouse or partner present, and 39.1% were households with a female householder and no spouse or partner present. About 27.9% of all households were made up of individuals, and 11.7% had someone living alone who was 65 years of age or older. There were 2,484 families residing in the CDP.

There were 4,430 housing units, of which 6.5% were vacant. The homeowner vacancy rate was 1.4% and the rental vacancy rate was 7.2%.

=== 2010 census ===
At the 2010 census, there were 10,162 people, 3,963 households and 2,834 families living in the community. The population density was 1,500 per square mile (580/km^{2}). There were 4,365 housing units at an average density of632 per square mile (244/km^{2}). The racial make-up of the community was 71.4% Black or African American, 26.2% White, 0.2% Native American, 0.2% Asian, 0.9% from other races and 1.0% from two or more races. 1.4% of the population were Hispanic or Latino of any race.

There were 3,963 households, of which 27.5% had children under the age of 18 living with them, 46.5% were married couples living together, 20.8% had a female householder with no husband present and 28.5% were non-families. 25.2% of all households were made up of individuals and 9.3% had someone living alone who was 65 years of age or older. The average household size was 2.56 and the average family size was 3.06.

23.2% of the population were under the age of 18, 7.9% from 18 to 24, 23.9% from 25 to 44, 30.2% from 45 to 64 and 14.7% who were 65 years of age or older. The median age was 40.9 years. For every 100 females, there were 86.8 males. For every 100 females age 18 and over, there were 84.9 males.

The median household income was $52,605 and the median family income was $60,067. Males had a median income of $42,207 and females $36,417. The per capita income was $23,819. About 6.4% of families and 8.7% of the population were below the poverty line, including 12.6% of those under age 18 and 1.8% of those age 65 or over.

=== 2000 census ===
At the 2000 census, there were 10,509 people, 4,161 households and 3,099 families living in the community. The population density was 1,523.0 per square mile (588.0/km^{2}). There were 4,357 housing units at an average density of 631.4 per square mile (243.8/km^{2}). The racial make-up of the community was 52.87% White, 45.92% Black or African American, 0.16% Native American, 0.35% Asian, 0.17% from other races and 0.52% from two or more races. 0.46% of the population were Hispanic or Latino of any race.

There were 4,161 households, of which 30.6% had children under the age of 18 living with them, 58.5% were married couples living together, 13.0% had a female householder with no husband present and 25.5% were non-families. 23.1% of all households were made up of individuals and 11.2% had someone living alone who was 65 years of age or older. The average household size was 2.53 and the average family size was 2.97.

22.8% of the population were under the age of 18, 7.4% from 18 to 24, 26.1% from 25 to 44, 26.3% from 45 to 64 and 17.4% who were 65 years of age or older. The median age was 41 years. For every 100 females, there were 88.5 males. For every 100 females age 18 and over, there were 84.7 males.

The median household income was $43,111 and the median family income was $51,188. Males had a median income of $36,048 and females $30,135. The per capita income was $19,954. About 4.4% of families and 6.4% of the population were below the poverty line, including 5.4% of those under age 18 and 8.8% of those age 65 or over.
