= Shannon, Alabama =

Unincorporated community in Alabama, United States

- Unincorporated community
- Shannon Post Office

- Location within Alabama Location within the United States
- Coordinates: 33°24′19″N 86°52′19″W
- Country: United States
- State: Alabama
- County: Jefferson
- Elevation: 646 ft (197 m)
- Time zone: UTC-6 (Central (CST))
  - Summer (DST): UTC-5 (CDT)
- ZIP code: 35142
- Area codes: 205, 659
- GNIS feature ID: 126626

Shannon is a small unincorporated community located in Jefferson County, Alabama, United States, between Birmingham and northwest Hoover named after John James Shannon, a mine operator. A post office first opened under the name Shannon in 1915.
