= Sayre, Alabama =

Unincorporated community in Alabama, United States

- Unincorporated community
- Location within Alabama Location within the United States
- Coordinates: 33°42′44″N 86°58′28″W
- Country: Location of Sayre Speedway (1/4 mile asphalt oval): United States
- State: Alabama
- County: Jefferson
- Elevation: 417 ft (127 m)
- Time zone: UTC-6 (Central (CST))
  - Summer (DST): UTC-5 (CDT)
- ZIP code: 35139
- Area codes: 205, 659
- GNIS feature ID: 126454

Sayre is an unincorporated community in Jefferson County, Alabama, United States. Sayre is 16.5 miles (26.6 km) northwest of downtown Birmingham. Sayre had a post office from October 4, 1904, to November 5, 2011; it still has its own ZIP code, 35139.
