= Grayson Valley, Alabama =

Unincorporated community in Alabama, United States

- Census-designated place (CDP) & Unincorporated community
- Location in Jefferson County and the state of Alabama
- Coordinates: 33°38′48″N 86°38′31″W
- Country: United States
- State: Alabama
- County: Jefferson

Area
  - Total: 1.91 sq mi (4.95 km^{2})
  - Land: 1.91 sq mi (4.95 km^{2})
  - Water: 0 sq mi (0.00 km^{2})
- Elevation: 932 ft (284 m)

Population (2020)
  - Total: 5,982
  - Density: 3,132.1/sq mi (1,209.32/km^{2})
- Time zone: UTC-6 (Central (CST))
  - Summer (DST): UTC-5 (CDT)
- ZIP Code: 35235
- Area codes: 205, 659
- FIPS code: 01-31348
- GNIS feature ID: 2402547

Grayson Valley is an unincorporated community and census-designated place in the northeastern Birmingham area, in Jefferson County, Alabama, United States. It is located between the Spring Lake neighborhood of Birmingham, Alabama and the Birmingham suburbs of Clay, Trussville, and Center Point. At the 2020 census, the population was 5,982.

== Demographics ==
Historical population
Census	Pop.	Note	%±
2000	5,447		—
2010	5,736		5.3%
2020	5,982		4.3%
U.S. Decennial Census

Grayson Valley first appeared as a census designated place in the 2000 U.S. Census created from part of deleted Pinson-Clay-Chalkville CDP.

=== Racial and ethnic composition ===
Grayson Valley CDP, Alabama – Racial and ethnic composition Note: the US Census treats Hispanic/Latino as an ethnic category. This table excludes Latinos from the racial categories and assigns them to a separate category. Hispanics/Latinos may be of any race.
Race / Ethnicity (NH = Non-Hispanic)	Pop 2000	Pop 2010	Pop 2020	% 2000	% 2010	% 2020
White alone (NH)	5,127	3,970	2,272	94.13%	69.21%	37.98%
Black or African American alone (NH)	188	1,473	3,109	3.45%	25.68%	51.97%
Native American or Alaska Native alone (NH)	15	15	7	0.28%	0.26%	0.12%
Asian alone (NH)	31	50	60	0.57%	0.87%	1.00%
Native Hawaiian or Pacific Islander alone (NH)	0	1	0	0.00%	0.02%	0.00%
Other race alone (NH)	2	1	19	0.04%	0.02%	0.32%
Mixed race or Multiracial (NH)	46	97	218	0.84%	1.69%	3.64%
Hispanic or Latino (any race)	38	129	297	0.70%	2.25%	4.96%
Total	5,447	5,736	5,982	100.00%	100.00%	100.00%

=== 2020 census ===
As of the 2020 census, Grayson Valley had a population of 5,982. The median age was 35.0 years. 25.1% of residents were under the age of 18 and 12.8% of residents were 65 years of age or older. For every 100 females there were 84.6 males, and for every 100 females age 18 and over there were 79.2 males age 18 and over.

100.0% of residents lived in urban areas, while 0.0% lived in rural areas.

There were 2,362 households and 1,718 families residing in the CDP, of which 34.7% had children under the age of 18 living in them. Of all households, 36.4% were married-couple households, 18.2% were households with a male householder and no spouse or partner present, and 39.5% were households with a female householder and no spouse or partner present. About 29.3% of all households were made up of individuals and 9.5% had someone living alone who was 65 years of age or older.

There were 2,517 housing units, of which 6.2% were vacant. The homeowner vacancy rate was 1.3% and the rental vacancy rate was 10.4%.
