= Kimbrell, Alabama =

Unincorporated community in Alabama, United States

- Unincorporated community
- Location within Alabama Location within the United States
- Coordinates: 33°16′34″N 87°04′02″W
- Country: United States
- State: Alabama
- Counties: Jefferson and Tuscaloosa
- Elevation: 479 ft (146 m)
- Time zone: UTC-6 (Central (CST))
  - Summer (DST): UTC-5 (CDT)
- Area codes: 205, 659
- GNIS feature ID: 151955

Kimbrell (also Kimbrel) is an unincorporated community in Jefferson and Tuscaloosa counties, Alabama, United States. Kimbrell was named in honor of Miles Kimbrell, a storekeeper and sewing machine agent. A post office operated under the name Kimbrel from 1895 to 1905.
