= Acipcoville, Alabama =

Acipcoville
- Neighborhood
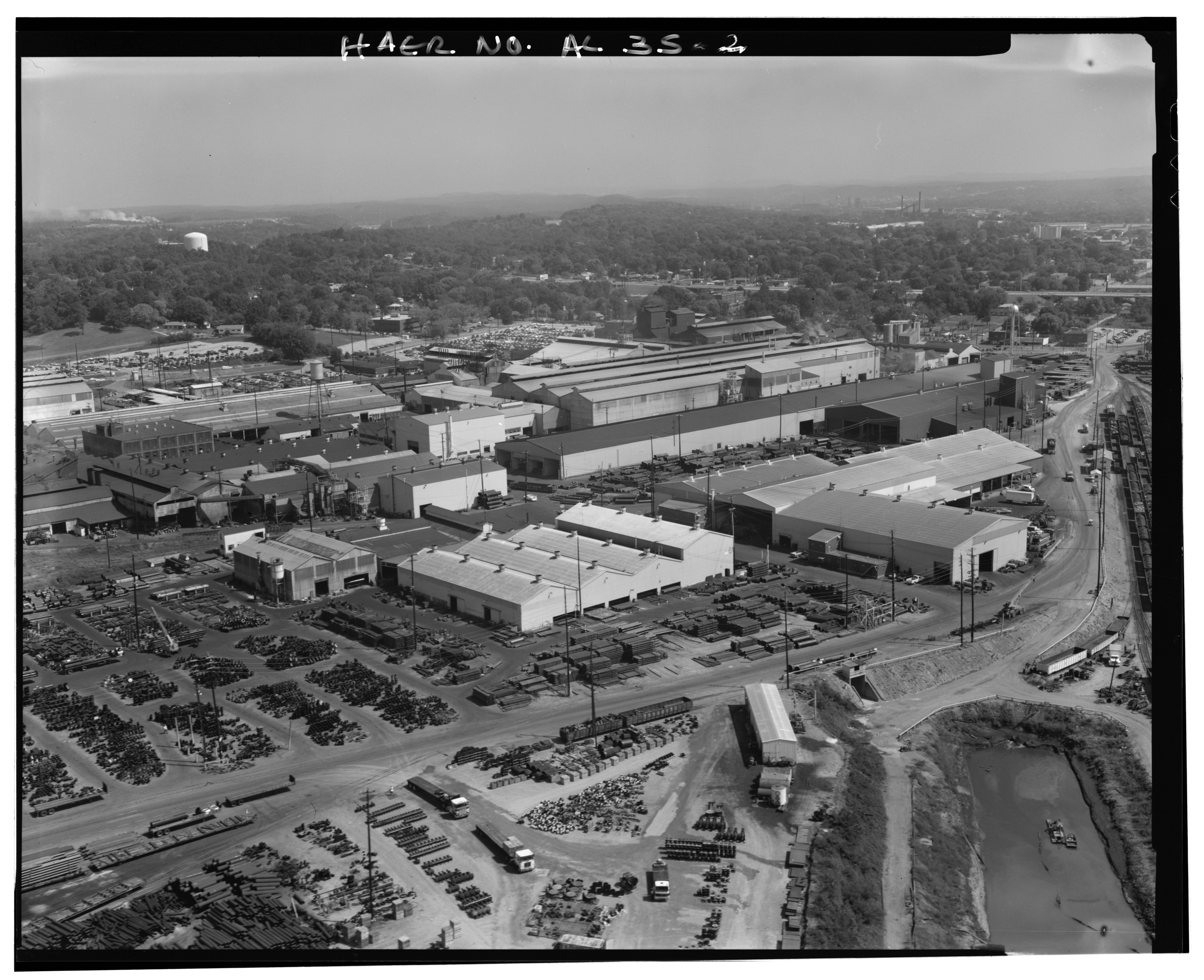
- American Cast Iron Pipe Company, 1501 Thirty-first Avenue North, Birmingham, AL

- Location in Alabama Location within United States
- Coordinates: 33°33′22.4″N 86°50′35.0″W
- Country: United States
- State: Alabama
- City: Birmingham
- Elevation: 610 ft (186 m)
- Time zone: UTC-6 (CST)
  - Summer (DST): UTC-5 (CDT)
- ZIP Code: 35207
- Area codes: 205, 659

Acipcoville is a neighborhood in Birmingham in Jefferson County, Alabama, United States.

== History ==
Acipcoville was named for the American Cast Iron Pipe Company (ACIPCO), which built the community around its manufacturing plant near Birmingham. Investors from the southern United States met in Atlanta in 1905 to organize and wholly finance ACIPCO. They selected Birmingham as the site for a new pipe plant and in 1906 constructed a pipe foundry, powerhouse and machine shop and "Quarters" for about 40 black families. Guided by John J. Eagan, principal stockholder and first president, the company began providing amenities for its workers living in Acipcoville. The first of these was a bathhouse constructed in 1912 at the plant site.

During World War I, ACIPCO experimented with the direct delivery of molten pig iron from the blast furnaces of Republic Steel Corporation's Thomas plant to its pipemaking foundry. In the early 1920s, when the Birmingham District led the industry in the adoption of centrifugal casting techniques, ACIPCO developed the Moore method of centrifugal casting in sand-lined molds. Company President John H. Eagan's Plan of Business Administration, which became permanent company policy in 1924, featured employee profit sharing. Eagan's profit sharing idea became a model widely emulated in American industry.

In 1921, Eagan brought workers into corporate management and, in 1922, created a profit-sharing arrangement. At his death, he created a permanent trust of all the company's common stock. ACIPCO's operation has continued as a beneficial trust ever since.

== Demographics ==
According to the census returns from 1850-2010 for Alabama, it has never reported a population figure separately on the U.S. Census. It is a part of the city of Birmingham, Alabama today.

== Gallery ==
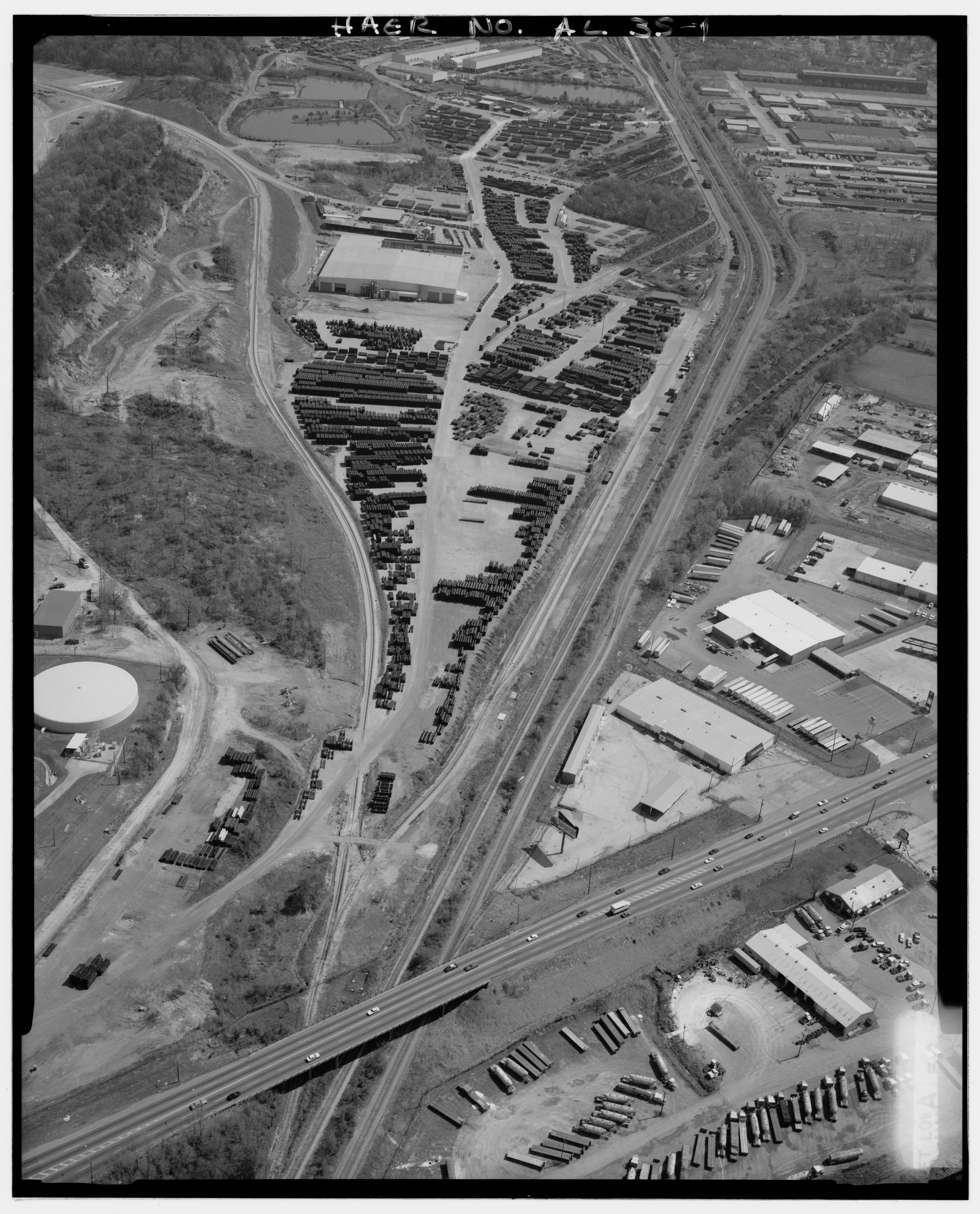
Pipe Storage Yard, American Cast Iron Pipe Company

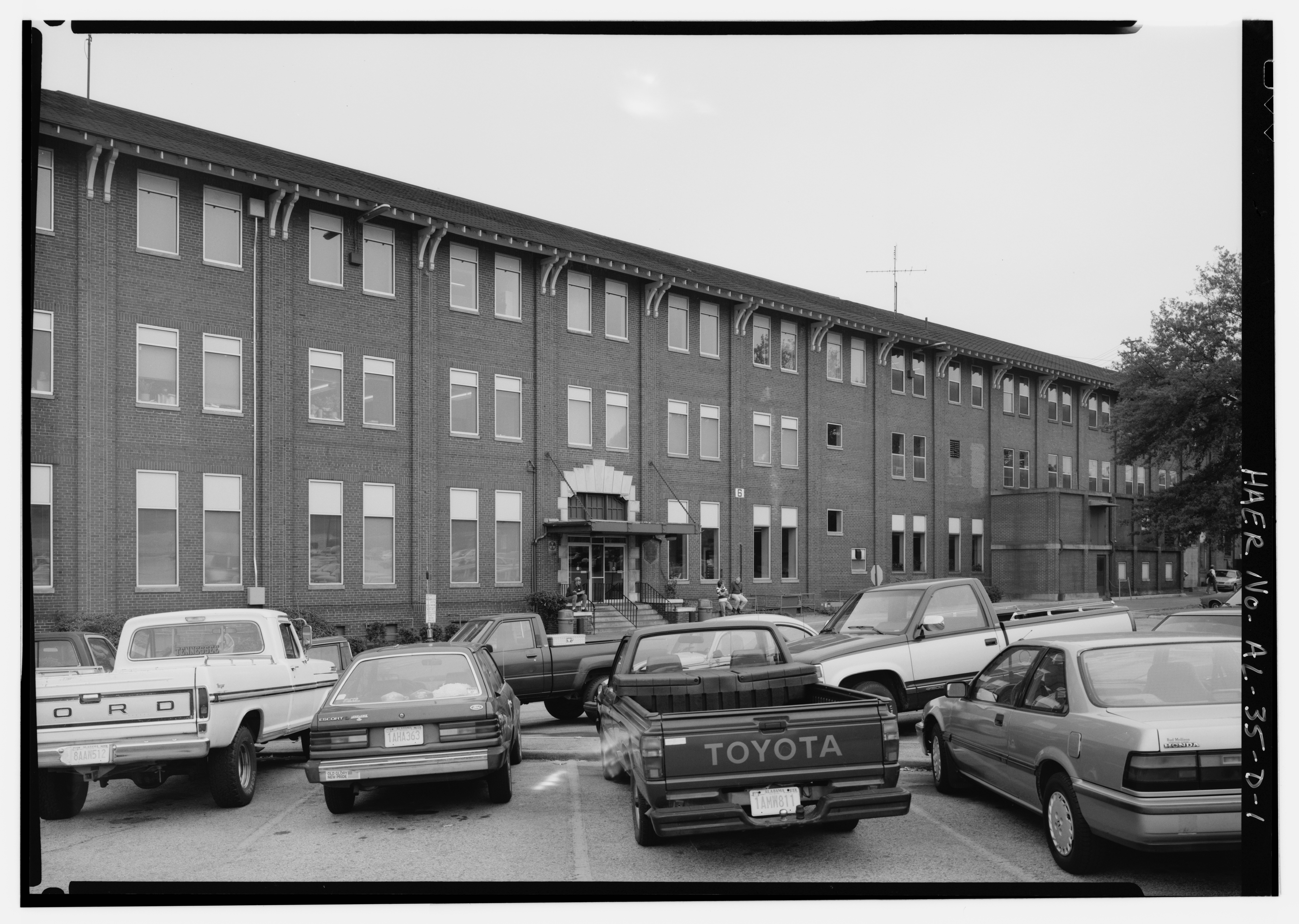
ACIPCO Company Building
