= Robbins Crossroads, Alabama =

Unincorporated community in Alabama, United States

- Unincorporated community
- Location within Alabama Location within the United States
- Coordinates: 33°44′04″N 86°59′44″W
- Country: United States
- State: Alabama
- County: Jefferson
- Elevation: 364 ft (111 m)
- Time zone: UTC−6 (Central (CST))
  - Summer (DST): UTC−5 (CDT)
- Area codes: 205, 659
- GNIS feature ID: 153166

Robbins Crossroads, also known as Robbins, is an unincorporated community in Jefferson County, Alabama, United States.

== History ==
The community is named for the Robbins family, who moved to the area from Pendleton District, South Carolina. At one time, Robbins Crossroads was home to a grist mill, cotton gin, saw mill, general store, and saloon.

A post office operated under the name Robbins Crossroads from 1873 to 1896.
