= Palmerdale, Alabama =

Unincorporated community in Alabama, United States

- Unincorporated community
- Location within Alabama Location within the United States
- Coordinates: 33°44′19″N 86°38′46″W
- Country: United States
- State: Alabama
- County: Jefferson
- Elevation: 686 ft (209 m)
- Time zone: UTC-6 (Central (CST))
  - Summer (DST): UTC-5 (CDT)
- ZIP code: 35123
- Area codes: 205, 659
- GNIS feature ID: 152836

Palmerdale is an area in Jefferson County, Alabama, United States. Most of the community falls within the city limits of Pinson. Palmerdale is located on Alabama State Route 75, 4 miles (6.4 km) north-northeast of the downtown area of Pinson.

The community traces its history back to the Great Depression and President Franklin Delano Roosevelt's Resettlement Administration, part of the New Deal. Palmerdale Homestead was established to bring impoverished people out of urban areas, setting them up with small farms in nearby rural areas. Originally named Palmer Station for the Louisville and Nashville Railroad station that served the area, the name was changed to Palmerdale in the 1930s.

Palmerdale became part of Pinson when the latter became incorporated in 2004.

Palmerdale has a post office with ZIP code 35123.

== See also ==
- Palmerdale Homestead Community Center
