= Cardiff, Alabama =

- Town
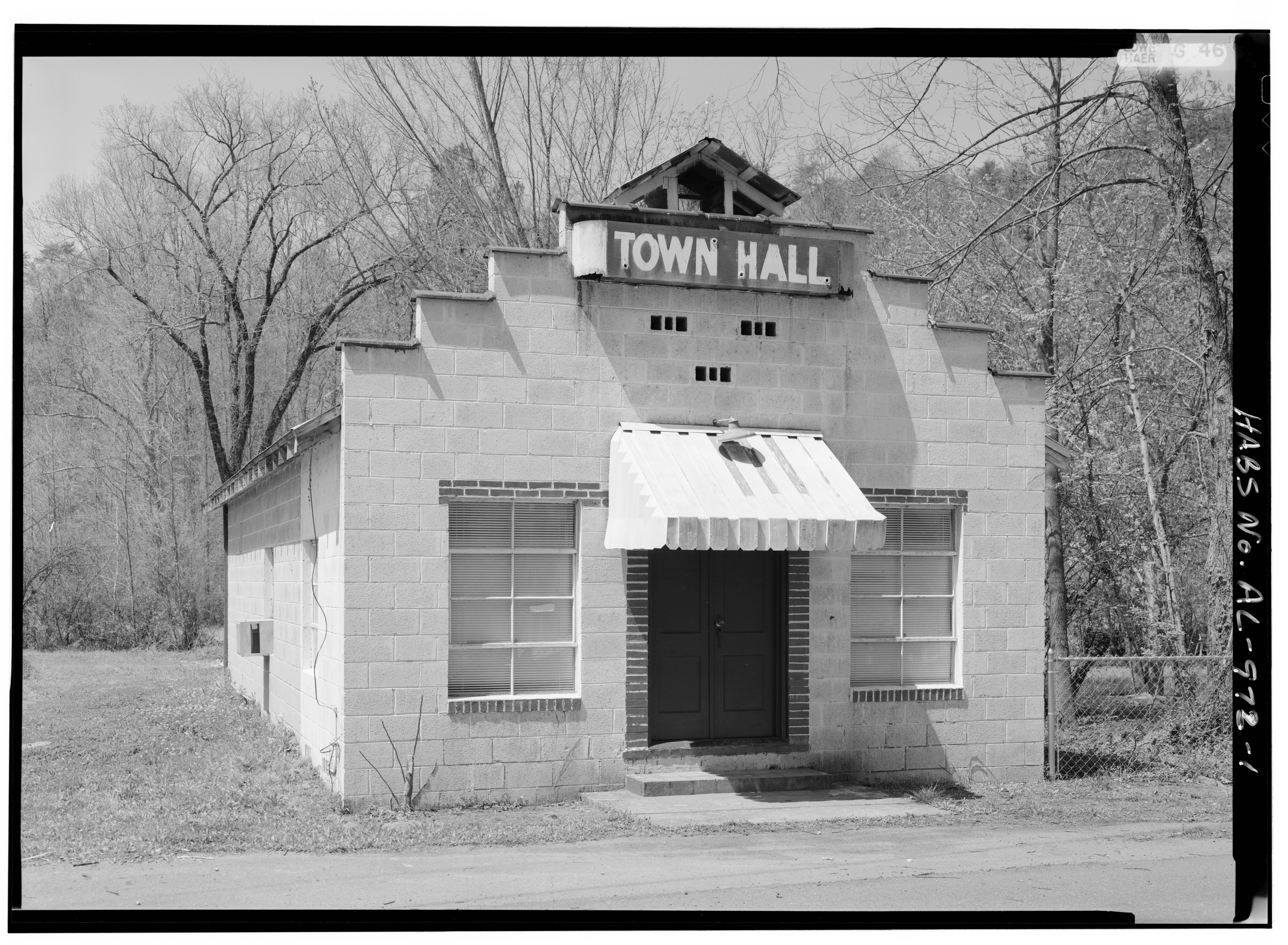
- Cardiff Town Hall, taken as part of the Historic American Buildings Survey

- Location of Cardiff in Jefferson County, Alabama.
- Coordinates: 33°38′50″N 86°55′50″W
- Country: United States
- State: Alabama
- County: Jefferson

Area
  - Total: 0.21 sq mi (0.54 km^{2})
  - Land: 0.21 sq mi (0.54 km^{2})
  - Water: 0 sq mi (0.00 km^{2})
- Elevation: 374 ft (114 m)

Population (2020)
  - Total: 52
  - Density: 249/sq mi (96.1/km^{2})
- Time zone: UTC-6 (Central (CST))
  - Summer (DST): UTC-5 (CDT)
- ZIP code: 35041
- Area codes: 205 & 659
- FIPS code: 01-12040
- GNIS feature ID: 2405377

Cardiff is a town in Jefferson County, Alabama, United States west of Gardendale. As of the 2020 census, Cardiff had a population of 52. It is named after the capital of Wales. It is one of four Jefferson County cities named after cities in Great Britain, the others being Birmingham, Leeds and Brighton.

== Geography ==
Cardiff is located on Five Mile Creek, a tributary of the Locust Fork of the Black Warrior River. It is immediately downstream of Brookside. The region is part of the Cumberland Plateau, with shallow but deeply incised stream valleys dissecting sedimentary rock, including significant seams of bituminous coal.

According to the U.S. Census Bureau, the town has a total area of 0.2 square miles (0.52 km^{2}), all land.

== Demographics ==
Historical population
Census	Pop.	Note	%±
1890	203		—
1900	562		176.8%
1910	426		−24.2%
1920	463		8.7%
1930	146		−68.5%
1940	246		68.5%
1950	204		−17.1%
1960	202		−1.0%
1970	127		−37.1%
1980	140		10.2%
1990	72		−48.6%
2000	82		13.9%
2010	55		−32.9%
2020	52		−5.5%
U.S. Decennial Census

=== 2020 census ===
Cardiff town, Alabama – Racial and ethnic composition Note: the US Census treats Hispanic/Latino as an ethnic category. This table excludes Latinos from the racial categories and assigns them to a separate category. Hispanics/Latinos may be of any race.
Race / Ethnicity (NH = Non-Hispanic)	Pop 2000	Pop 2010	Pop 2020	% 2000	% 2010	% 2020
White alone (NH)	77	52	50	93.90%	94.55%	96.15%
Black or African American alone (NH)	5	3	0	6.10%	5.45%	0.00%
Native American or Alaska Native alone (NH)	0	0	0	0.00%	0.00%	0.00%
Asian alone (NH)	0	0	0	0.00%	0.00%	0.00%
Native Hawaiian or Pacific Islander alone (NH)	0	0	0	0.00%	0.00%	0.00%
Other race alone (NH)	0	0	0	0.00%	0.00%	0.00%
Mixed race or Multiracial (NH)	0	0	0	0.00%	0.00%	0.00%
Hispanic or Latino (any race)	0	0	2	0.00%	0.00%	3.85%
Total	82	55	52	100.00%	100.00%	100.00%

=== 2000 census ===
As of the census of 2000, there were 82 people, 33 households, and 26 families residing in the town. The population density was 401.3 inhabitants per square mile (154.9/km^{2}). There were 38 housing units at an average density of 186.0 per square mile (71.8/km^{2}). The racial makeup of the town was 93.90% White and 6.10% Black or African American.

There were 33 households, out of which 27.3% had children under the age of 18 living with them, 60.6% were married couples living together, 12.1% had a female householder with no husband present, and 21.2% were non-families. 18.2% of all households were made up of individuals, and 12.1% had someone living alone who was 65 years of age or older. The average household size was 2.48 and the average family size was 2.85.

In the town, the population was spread out, with 22.0% under the age of 18, 8.5% from 18 to 24, 32.9% from 25 to 44, 18.3% from 45 to 64, and 18.3% who were 65 years of age or older. The median age was 40 years. For every 100 females, there were 86.4 males. For every 100 females age 18 and over, there were 88.2 males.

The median income for a household in the town was $34,107, and the median income for a family was $45,000. Males had a median income of $28,906 versus $18,125 for females. The per capita income for the town was $16,067. There were 5.6% of families and 8.1% of the population living below the poverty line, including no under eighteens and none of those over 64.

== History ==
Coal mining was the historical basis of the economy. The town, for years the smallest incorporated town in the State of Alabama, declined along with the decline of underground coal mining and the rise of strip mining. The epochal flood of May 2003 destroyed a number of buildings in that part of Cardiff close to Five Mile Creek. The town is now but a dent in the land; scarce of life with a scant 20–30 people and covered with kudzu. Cardiff is becoming a ghost town.
