= Jefferson County, Alabama =

County in Alabama, United States

- County
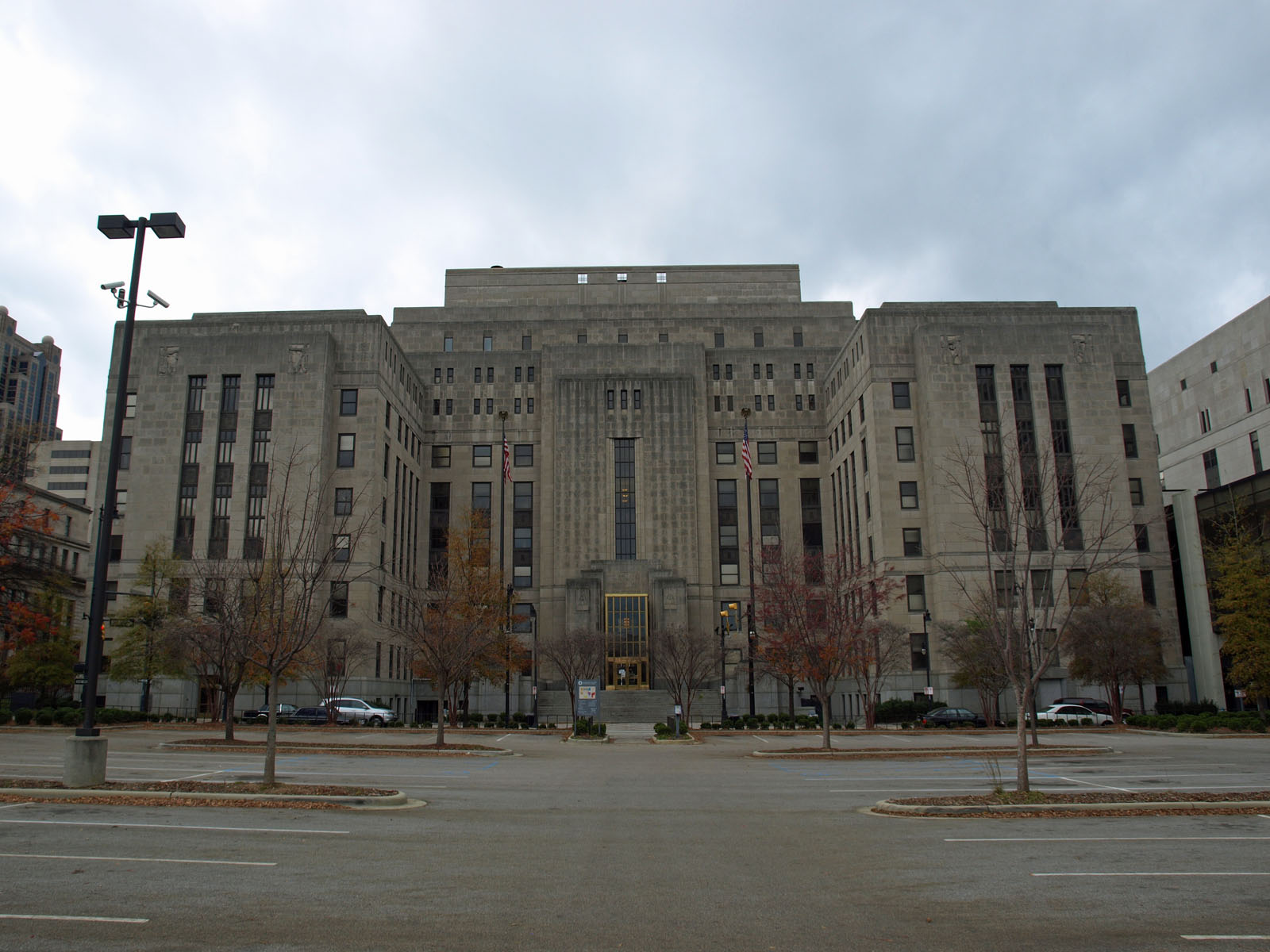
- Jefferson County Courthouse in Birmingham

- Seal

- Location within the U.S. state of Alabama
- Coordinates: 33.52°N 86.81°W
- Country: United States
- State: Alabama
- Founded: December 13, 1819
- Named for: Thomas Jefferson
- Seat: Birmingham
- Largest city: Birmingham

Area
  - Total: 1,124 sq mi (2,910 km^{2})
  - Land: 1,111 sq mi (2,880 km^{2})
  - Water: 13 sq mi (34 km^{2}) 1.1%

Population (2020)
  - Total: 674,721
  - Estimate (2025): 665,742 ▼
  - Density: 607.3/sq mi (234.5/km^{2})
- Time zone: UTC−6 (Central)
  - Summer (DST): UTC−5 (CDT)
- Congressional districts: 6th, 7th
- Website: www.jccal.org
- County Number 01 on Alabama License Plates; One of three counties shuffled to the top 3 numbers because of population size.

Jefferson County is the most populous county in the U.S. state of Alabama, located in the central portion of the state. As of the 2020 census, its population was 674,721. Its county seat is Birmingham. Its rapid growth as an industrial city in the 20th century, based on heavy manufacturing in steel and iron, established its dominance. Jefferson County is the central county of the Birmingham-Hoover, AL Metropolitan Statistical Area.

== History ==
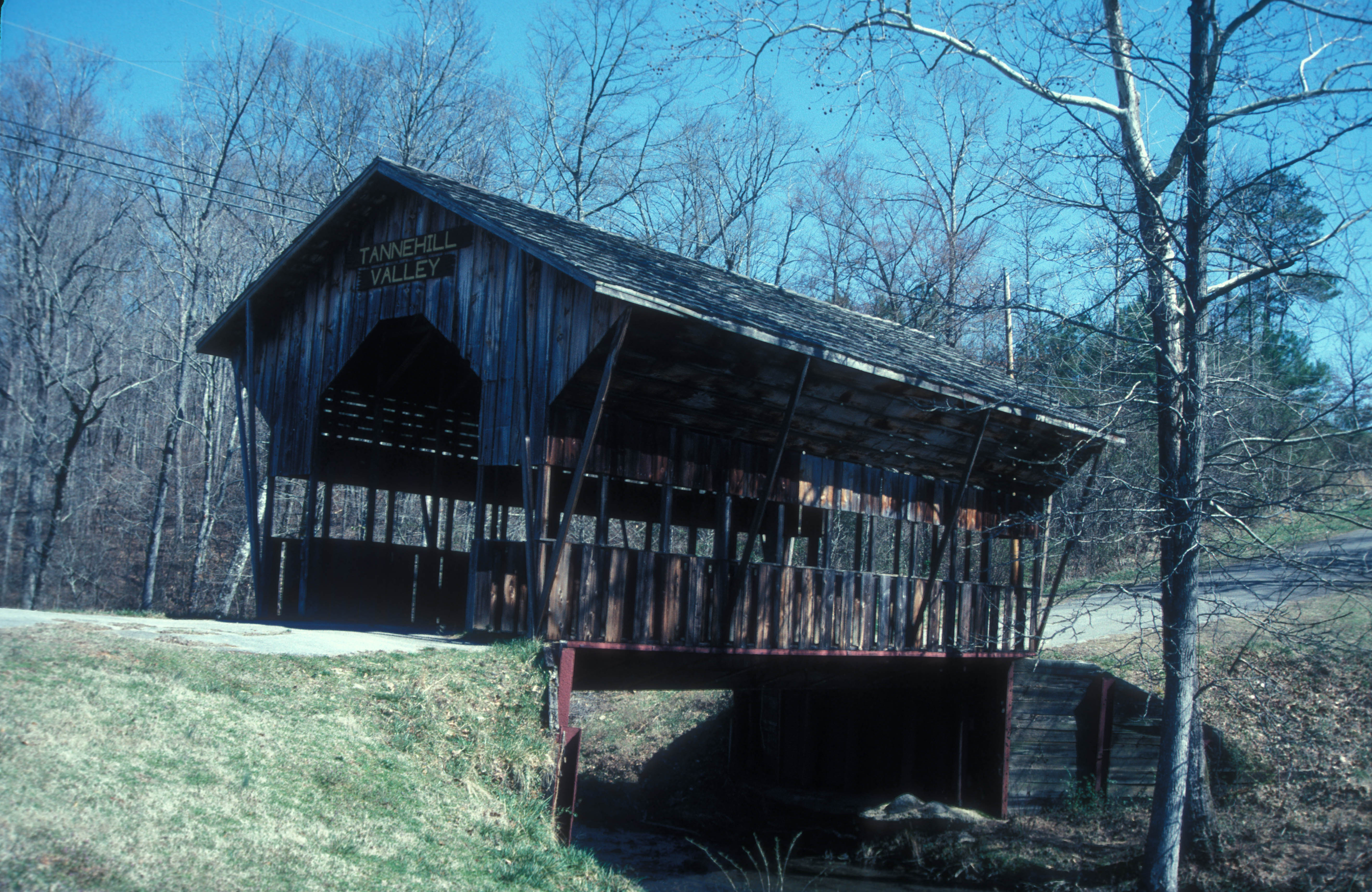
Tannehill Valley Covered Bridge near McCalla.

Jefferson County was established on December 13, 1819, by the Alabama Legislature. It was named in honor of former President Thomas Jefferson. The county is located in the north-central portion of the state, on the southernmost edge of the Appalachian Mountains. It is in the center of the (former) iron, coal, and limestone mining belt of the Southern United States.

Most of the original settlers were migrants of English ancestry from the Carolinas. Jefferson County has a land area of about 1,119 square miles (2,900 km^{2}). Early county seats were established first at Carrollsville (1819 – 21), then Elyton (1821 – 73).

Founded around 1871, Birmingham was named for the industrial English city of the same name in Warwickshire. That city had long been a center of iron and steel production in Great Britain. Birmingham was formed by the merger of three towns, including Elyton. It has continued to grow by annexing neighboring towns and villages, including North Birmingham.

As Birmingham industrialized, its growth accelerated, particularly after 1890. It attracted numerous rural migrants, both black and white, for its new jobs. It also attracted European immigrants. Despite the city's rapid growth, for decades it was underrepresented in the legislature. Legislators from rural counties kept control of the legislature and, to avoid losing power, for decades refused to reapportion the seats or redistrict congressional districts. Birmingham could not get its urban needs addressed by the legislature.

Nearby Bessemer, Alabama, located 16 miles by car to the southwest, also grew based on industrialization. It also attracted many workers. By the early decades of the 20th century, it had a majority-black population, but whites dominated politically and economically.

=== Civil rights ===
Racial tensions increased in the cities and state in the late 19th century as whites worked to maintain white supremacy. The white-dominated legislature passed a new constitution in 1901 that disenfranchised most blacks and many poor whites, excluding them totally from the political system. While they were nominally still eligible in the mid-20th century for jury duty, they were overwhelmingly excluded by white administrators from juries into the 1950s. Economic competition among the new workers in the city also raised tensions. It was a rough environment of mill and mine workers in Birmingham and Bessemer, and the Ku Klux Klan was active in the 20th century, often with many police being members into the 1950s and 1960s.

In a study of lynchings in the South from 1877 to 1950, Jefferson County is documented as having the highest number of lynchings of any county in Alabama. White mobs committed 29 lynchings in the county, most around the turn of the century at a time of widespread political suppression of blacks in the state. Notable incidents include 1889's lynching of George Meadows.

Even after 1950, racial violence of whites against blacks continued. In the 1950s KKK chapters bombed black-owned houses in Birmingham to discourage residents moving into new middle-class areas. In that period, the city was referred to as "Bombingham".

In 1963 African Americans led a movement in the city seeking civil rights, including integration of public facilities. The Birmingham campaign was known for the violence the city police used against non-violent protesters. In the late summer, city and business officials finally agreed in 1963 to integrate public facilities and hire more African Americans. This followed the civil rights campaign, which was based at the 16th Street Baptist Church, and an economic boycott of white stores that refused to hire blacks. Whites struck again: on a Sunday in September 1963, KKK members bombed the 16th Street Baptist Church, killing four young black girls and injuring many persons. The African-American community quickly rebuilt the damaged church. They entered politics in the city, county and state after the Voting Rights Act of 1965 was passed.

=== Sewer construction and bond swap controversy ===
In the 1990s, the county authorized and financed a massive overhaul of the county-owned sewer system, beginning in 1996. Sewerage and water rates had increased more than 300% in the 15 years before 2011, causing severe problems for the poor in Birmingham and the county.

Costs for the project increased due to problems in the financial area. In addition, county officials, encouraged by bribes by financial services companies, made a series of risky bond-swap agreements. Two extremely controversial undertakings by county officials in the 2000s resulted in the county having debt of $4 billion. The county eventually declared bankruptcy in 2011. It was the largest municipal bankruptcy in United States history at that time. Both the sewer project and its financing were scrutinized by federal prosecutors. By 2011, "six of Jefferson County's former commissioners had been found guilty of corruption for accepting the bribes, along with 15 other officials."

The controversial interest rate swaps, initiated in 2002 and 2003 by former Commission President Larry Langford (removed in 2011 as the mayor of Birmingham after his conviction at trial), were intended to lower interest payments. But they had the opposite effect, increasing the county's indebtedness to the point that it had to declare bankruptcy. The bond swaps were the focus of an investigation by the United States Securities and Exchange Commission.

In late February 2008 Standard & Poor's lowered the rating of Jefferson County bonds to "junk" status. The likelihood of the county filing for Chapter 9 bankruptcy protection was debated in the press. In early March 2008, Moody's followed suit and indicated that it would also review the county's ability to meet other bond obligations. On March 7, 2008, Jefferson County failed to post $184 million collateral as required under its sewer bond agreements, thereby moving into technical default.

In February 2011, Lesley Curwen of the BBC World Service interviewed David Carrington, the newly appointed president of the County Commission, about the risk of defaulting on bonds issued to finance "what could be the most expensive sewage system in history." Carrington said there was "no doubt that people from Wall Street offered bribes" and "have to take a huge responsibility for what happened." Wall Street investment banks, including JP Morgan and others, arranged complex financial deals using swaps. The fees and penalty charges increased the cost so the county in 2011 had $3.2 billion outstanding. Carrington said one of the problems was that elected officials had welcomed scheduling with very low early payments so long as peak payments occurred after they left office.

In 2011 the SEC awarded the county $75 million in compensation in relation to a judgment of "unlawful payments" against JP Morgan; in addition the company was penalized by having to forfeit $647 million of future fees.

=== 2011 bankruptcy filing ===
Jefferson County filed for bankruptcy on November 9, 2011. This action was valued at $4.2 billion, with debts of $3.14 billion relating to sewer work; it was then the most costly municipal bankruptcy ever in the United States. In 2013, it was surpassed by the Detroit bankruptcy in Michigan. The County requested Chapter 9 relief under federal statute 11 U.S.C. §921. The case was filed in the Northern District of Alabama Bankruptcy Court as case number 11-05736.

As of May 2012, Jefferson County had slashed expenses and reduced employment of county government workers by more than 700. The county emerged from bankruptcy in December 2013, following the approval of a bankruptcy plan by the United States bankruptcy court for the Northern District of Alabama, writing off more than $1.4 billion of the debt.

== Geography ==
According to the United States Census Bureau, the county has a total area of 1,124 square miles (2,910 km^{2}), of which 1,111 square miles (2,880 km^{2}) is land and 13 square miles (34 km^{2}) (1.1%) is water. It is the fifth-largest county in Alabama by land area.

The county is located within the Ridge-and-Valley Appalachians, with the highest point in the county being found at Shades Mountain, at an elevation of 1,150 ft. Another significant mountain located within the county is Red Mountain, which runs to the south of downtown Birmingham and separates the city from the suburb of Homewood. Many other mountains and valleys make up the majority of the county's diverse geography.

The county is home to the Watercress Darter National Wildlife Refuge.

=== Adjacent counties ===
- Tuscaloosa County (west)
- Bibb County (southwest)
- Shelby County (south)
- Walker County (northwest)
- Blount County (northeast)
- St. Clair County (northeast)

== Demographics ==
Historical population
Census	Pop.	Note	%±
1830	6,855		—
1840	7,131		4.0%
1850	8,989		26.1%
1860	11,746		30.7%
1870	12,345		5.1%
1880	23,272		88.5%
1890	88,501		280.3%
1900	140,420		58.7%
1910	226,476		61.3%
1920	310,054		36.9%
1930	431,493		39.2%
1940	459,930		6.6%
1950	558,928		21.5%
1960	634,864		13.6%
1970	644,991		1.6%
1980	671,371		4.1%
1990	651,525		−3.0%
2000	662,047		1.6%
2010	658,466		−0.5%
2020	674,721		2.5%
2025 (est.)	665,742	▼	−1.3%
U.S. Decennial Census; 1790–1960 1900–1990; 1990–2000 2010–2020

=== 2020 census ===
As of the 2020 census, the county had a population of 674,721. The median age was 38.3 years. 21.9% of residents were under the age of 18 and 16.8% of residents were 65 years of age or older. For every 100 females there were 89.1 males, and for every 100 females age 18 and over there were 85.3 males age 18 and over.

There were 274,699 households in the county, of which 28.9% had children under the age of 18 living with them and 36.2% had a female householder with no spouse or partner present. About 32.2% of all households were made up of individuals and 11.7% had someone living alone who was 65 years of age or older. There were 170,971 families residing in the county. The population density was 607.0 inhabitants per square mile (234.4/km^{2}). There were 307,927 housing units, of which 10.8% were vacant. Among occupied housing units, 61.4% were owner-occupied and 38.6% were renter-occupied. The homeowner vacancy rate was 1.6% and the rental vacancy rate was 11.4%.

87.9% of residents lived in urban areas, while 12.1% lived in rural areas.

=== Racial and ethnic composition ===
Jefferson County, Alabama – Racial and ethnic composition Note: the US Census treats Hispanic/Latino as an ethnic category. This table excludes Latinos from the racial categories and assigns them to a separate category. Hispanics/Latinos may be of any race.
Race / Ethnicity (NH = Non-Hispanic)	Pop 1980	Pop 1990	Pop 2000	Pop 2010	Pop 2020	% 1980	% 1990	% 2000	% 2010	% 2020
White alone (NH)	442,193	416,458	379,707	340,213	324,252	65.87%	63.92%	57.35%	51.67%	48.06%
Black or African American alone (NH)	221,788	228,191	259,623	275,511	280,112	33.04%	35.02%	39.22%	41.84%	41.52%
Native American or Alaska Native alone (NH)	535	864	1,314	1,431	1,207	0.08%	0.13%	0.20%	0.22%	0.18%
Asian alone (NH)	1,715	3,146	5,909	9,085	13,043	0.26%	0.48%	0.89%	1.38%	1.93%
Native Hawaiian or Pacific Islander alone (NH)	x	x	125	154	311	x	x	0.02%	0.02%	0.05%
Other race alone (NH)	618	121	367	531	1,966	0.09%	0.02%	0.06%	0.08%	0.29%
Mixed race or Multiracial (NH)	x	x	4,718	6,053	18,974	x	x	0.71%	0.92%	2.81%
Hispanic or Latino (any race)	4,475	2,745	10,284	25,488	34,856	0.67%	0.42%	1.55%	3.87%	5.17%
Total	671,324	651,525	662,047	658,466	674,721	100.00%	100.00%	100.00%	100.00%	100.00%

Racial / Ethnic Profile of places in Jefferson County (2020 Census)
Following is a table of cities, villages, and census designated places in Jefferson County, Alabmam. Data for the United States (with and without Puerto Rico), the state of Alabama, and Jefferson County itself have been included for comparison purposes.
The majority racial/ethnic group is coded per the key below. Communities that extend into and adjacent county or counties are delineated with a ‡ followed by an accompanying explanatory note. The full population of each community has been tabulated including the population in adjacent counties.

Majority minority with no dominant group
Majority White
Majority Black
Majority Hispanic
Majority Asian

Racial and ethnic composition of places in Jefferson County (2020 Census) (NH = Non-Hispanic) Note: the US Census treats Hispanic/Latino as an ethnic category. This table excludes Latinos from the racial categories and assigns them to a separate category. Hispanics/Latinos may be of any race.
Place	Designation	Total Population	White alone (NH)	%	Black or African American alone (NH)	%	Native American or Alaska Native alone (NH)	%	Asian alone (NH)	%	Pacific Islander alone (NH)	%	Other race alone (NH)	%	Mixed race or Multiracial (NH)	%	Hispanic or Latino (any race)	%
United States of America (50 states and D.C.)	x	331,449,281	191,697,647	57.84%	39,940,338	12.05%	2,251,699	0.68%	19,618,719	5.92%	622,018	0.19%	1,689,833	0.51%	13,548,983	4.09%	62,080,044	18.73%
United States of America (50 states, D.C., and Puerto Rico)	x	334,735,155	191,722,195	57.28%	39,944,624	11.93%	2,252,011	0.67%	19,621,465	5.86%	622,109	0.19%	1,692,341	0.51%	13,551,323	4.05%	65,329,087	19.52%
Alabama	State	5,024,279	3,171,351	63.12%	1,288,159	25.64%	23,119	0.46%	75,918	1.51%	2,612	0.05%	14,455	0.29%	184,618	3.67%	264,047	5.26%
Jefferson County	County	674,721	324,252	48.06%	280,112	41.52%	1,207	0.18%	13,043	1.93%	311	0.05%	1,966	0.29%	18,974	2.81%	34,856	5.17%
Adamsville	city	4,366	1,724	39.49%	2,300	52.68%	18	0.41%	10	0.23%	3	0.07%	16	0.37%	113	2.59%	182	4.17%
Bessemer	city	26,019	4,877	18.74%	18,107	69.59%	48	0.18%	68	0.26%	5	0.02%	69	0.27%	540	2.08%	2,305	8.86%
Birmingham ‡	city	200,733	45,993	22.91%	136,731	68.12%	346	0.17%	3,255	1.62%	109	0.05%	575	0.29%	4,450	2.22%	9,274	4.62%
Brighton	city	2,337	81	3.47%	1,805	77.24%	3	0.13%	5	0.21%	0	0.00%	4	0.17%	41	1.75%	398	17.03%
Center Point	city	16,406	2,799	17.06%	12,134	73.96%	26	0.16%	33	0.20%	10	0.06%	50	0.30%	417	2.54%	937	5.71%
Clay	city	10,291	5,560	54.03%	3,766	36.60%	20	0.19%	87	0.85%	5	0.05%	24	0.23%	425	4.13%	404	3.93%
Fairfield	city	10,000	217	2.17%	9,474	94.74%	7	0.07%	8	0.08%	3	0.03%	10	0.10%	122	1.22%	159	1.59%
Fultondale	city	9,876	4,877	49.38%	3,132	31.71%	15	0.15%	127	1.29%	0	0.00%	36	0.36%	328	3.32%	1,361	13.78%
Gardendale	city	16,044	12,254	76.38%	2,404	14.98%	36	0.22%	267	1.66%	11	0.07%	53	0.33%	553	3.45%	466	2.90%
Graysville	city	1,950	1,262	64.72%	536	27.49%	6	0.31%	7	0.36%	2	0.10%	2	0.10%	71	3.64%	64	3.28%
Helena ‡	city	20,914	15,149	72.43%	3,382	16.17%	41	0.20%	327	1.56%	12	0.06%	72	0.34%	915	4.38%	1,016	4.86%
Homewood	city	26,414	18,178	68.82%	5,223	19.77%	29	0.11%	715	2.71%	8	0.03%	69	0.26%	763	2.89%	1,429	5.41%
Hoover	city	92,606	62,841	67.86%	15,513	16.75%	114	0.12%	5,913	6.39%	17	0.02%	333	0.36%	3,171	3.42%	4,704	5.08%
Hueytown	city	16,776	8,639	51.50%	6,499	38.74%	32	0.19%	65	0.39%	5	0.03%	47	0.28%	528	3.15%	961	5.73%
Irondale	city	13,497	7,183	53.22%	4,032	29.87%	16	0.12%	211	1.56%	4	0.03%	28	0.21%	458	3.39%	1,565	11.60%
Kimberly	city	3,841	3,386	88.15%	234	6.09%	4	0.10%	7	0.18%	0	0.00%	1	0.03%	138	3.59%	71	1.85%
Leeds ‡	city	12,324	8,831	71.66%	1,887	15.31%	31	0.25%	85	0.69%	5	0.04%	57	0.46%	459	3.72%	969	7.86%
Lipscomb	city	2,086	273	13.09%	1,289	61.79%	6	0.29%	1	0.05%	1	0.05%	2	0.10%	65	3.12%	449	21.52%
Mountain Brook	city	22,461	21,241	94.57%	91	0.41%	10	0.04%	239	1.06%	0	0.00%	26	0.12%	503	2.24%	351	1.56%
Pinson	city	7,215	3,982	55.19%	2,373	32.89%	14	0.19%	37	0.51%	2	0.03%	17	0.24%	224	3.10%	566	7.84%
Pleasant Grove	city	9,544	3,252	34.07%	5,917	62.00%	20	0.21%	8	0.08%	3	0.03%	10	0.10%	201	2.11%	133	1.39%
Sumiton ‡	city	2,444	2,167	88.67%	112	4.58%	9	0.37%	17	0.70%	0	0.00%	3	0.12%	108	4.42%	28	1.15%
Tarrant	city	6,124	1,523	24.87%	3,098	50.59%	12	0.20%	31	0.51%	63	1.03%	23	0.38%	155	2.53%	1,219	19.91%
Trussville ‡	city	26,123	21,171	81.04%	2,866	10.97%	47	0.18%	541	2.07%	4	0.02%	60	0.23%	867	3.32%	567	2.17%
Vestavia Hills ‡	city	39,102	32,578	83.32%	1,816	4.64%	42	0.11%	2,197	5.62%	3	0.01%	127	0.32%	1,079	2.76%	1,260	3.22%
Warrior ‡	city	3,224	2,523	78.26%	463	14.36%	10	0.31%	16	0.50%	0	0.00%	16	0.50%	140	4.34%	56	1.74%
Argo ‡	town	4,368	3,706	84.84%	318	7.28%	11	0.25%	18	0.41%	0	0.00%	14	0.32%	206	4.72%	95	2.17%
Brookside	town	1,253	891	71.11%	266	21.23%	2	0.16%	4	0.32%	0	0.00%	6	0.48%	51	4.07%	33	2.63%
Cardiff	town	52	50	96.15%	0	0.00%	0	0.00%	0	0.00%	0	0.00%	0	0.00%	0	0.00%	2	3.85%
County Line ‡	town	311	266	85.53%	4	1.29%	2	0.64%	2	0.64%	0	0.00%	0	0.00%	22	7.07%	15	4.82%
Lake View ‡	town	3,560	2,634	73.99%	690	19.38%	15	0.42%	11	0.31%	0	0.00%	18	0.51%	103	2.89%	89	2.50%
Maytown	town	316	260	82.28%	30	9.49%	0	0.00%	0	0.00%	0	0.00%	1	0.32%	14	4.43%	11	3.48%
Midfield	town	5,211	422	8.10%	4,379	84.03%	15	0.29%	6	0.12%	1	0.02%	14	0.27%	94	1.80%	280	5.37%
Morris	town	2,259	2,096	92.78%	45	1.99%	2	0.09%	11	0.49%	0	0.00%	6	0.27%	79	3.50%	20	0.89%
Mulga	town	784	645	82.27%	104	13.27%	3	0.38%	1	0.13%	0	0.00%	2	0.26%	23	2.93%	6	0.77%
North Johns	town	127	68	53.54%	49	38.58%	0	0.00%	0	0.00%	1	0.79%	0	0.00%	2	1.57%	7	5.51%
Sylvan Springs	town	1,653	1,470	88.93%	49	2.96%	8	0.48%	0	0.00%	0	0.00%	1	0.06%	95	5.75%	30	1.81%
Trafford	town	613	494	80.59%	60	9.79%	1	0.16%	4	0.65%	0	0.00%	2	0.33%	36	5.87%	16	2.61%
West Jefferson	town	417	383	91.85%	3	0.72%	1	0.24%	1	0.24%	0	0.00%	0	0.00%	17	4.08%	12	2.88%
Concord	CDP	1,690	1,553	91.89%	37	2.19%	9	0.53%	1	0.06%	1	0.06%	6	0.36%	70	4.14%	13	0.77%
Edgewater	CDP	746	182	24.40%	519	69.57%	1	0.13%	3	0.40%	0	0.00%	1	0.13%	20	2.68%	20	2.68%
Forestdale	CDP	10,409	1,684	16.18%	8,187	78.65%	17	0.16%	16	0.15%	1	0.01%	35	0.34%	215	2.07%	254	2.44%
Grayson Valley	CDP	5,982	2,272	37.98%	3,109	51.97%	7	0.12%	60	1.00%	0	0.00%	19	0.32%	218	3.64%	297	4.96%
McCalla	CDP	12,965	7,322	56.48%	4,596	35.45%	23	0.18%	120	0.93%	1	0.01%	63	0.49%	390	3.01%	450	3.47%
McDonald Chapel	CDP	739	237	32.07%	352	47.63%	0	0.00%	14	1.89%	0	0.00%	6	0.81%	21	2.84%	109	14.75%
Minor	CDP	1,088	594	54.60%	357	32.81%	5	0.46%	4	0.37%	0	0.00%	3	0.28%	52	4.78%	73	6.71%
Mount Olive	CDP	4,427	4,029	91.01%	117	2.64%	12	0.27%	19	0.43%	1	0.02%	4	0.09%	162	3.66%	83	1.87%
Rock Creek	CDP	1,471	1,350	91.77%	31	2.11%	0	0.00%	0	0.00%	2	0.14%	10	0.68%	57	3.87%	21	1.43%

=== 2010 census ===
Jefferson County population had decreased slightly by 2010.

According to the 2010 census, residents of metropolitan Jefferson County identified as the following:

- 53.0% White
- 42.0% Black
- 0.3% Native American
- 1.4% Asian
- 0.0% Native Hawaiian or Pacific Islander
- 1.1% Two or more races
- 3.9% Hispanic or Latino (of any race)

=== 2000 census ===
As of the 2000 census, there were 662,047 people, 263,265 households, and 175,861 families residing in the county. The population density was 595 people per square mile (230 people/km^{2}). There were 288,162 housing units at an average density of 259 units per square mile (100 units/km^{2}). The racial makeup of the county was 58.10% White, 39.36% Black or African American, 0.21% Native American, 0.90% Asian, 0.03% Pacific Islander, 0.59% from other races, and 0.80% from two or more races. About 1.55% of the population were Hispanic or Latino of any race.

The largest self-reported European ancestries in Jefferson County, Alabama are English 9.7%(64,016), "American" 9.6%(63,015), Irish 8.6%(56,695), German 7.2%(47,690). Many Americans whose ancestors came from Britain or Ireland identify simply as American, because their immigrant ancestors arrived so long ago, in some cases in the 17th and 18th centuries. Demographers estimate that roughly 20–23% of people in Alabama are of predominantly English and related British Isles ancestry. Researchers believe that more of the European-American population has Scots-Irish ancestry than residents identify with today. In addition, many African Americans have racially-mixed ancestry, often with some ancestors from the British Isles. Having been classified in the South as black under racial segregation, some of these families are beginning to use DNA tests to learn about and acknowledge European ancestors. Some identify as multiracial as a result.

There were 263,265 households, out of which 30.80% had children under the age of 18 living with them, 46.10% were married couples living together, 17.20% had a female householder with no husband present, and 33.20% were non-families. Nearly 28.70% of all households were made up of individuals, and 9.90% had someone living alone who was 65 years of age or older. The average household size was 2.45, and the average family size was 3.04.

In the county, 24.80% of the population was under the age of 18, 9.60% from 18 to 24, 29.70% from 25 to 44, 22.30% from 45 to 64, and 13.60% was 65 years of age or older. The median age was 36 years. For every 100 females, there were 89.20 males. For every 100 females age 18 and over, there were 84.50 males.

In 2007 Jefferson County had the highest rate of syphilis cases per 100,000 in the US, according to data from the Centers for Disease Control and Prevention.

The median income for a household in the county was $36,868, and the median income for a family was $45,951. Males had a median income of $35,954 versus $26,631 for females. The per capita income for the county was $20,892. About 11.60% of families and 14.80% of the population were below the poverty line, including 20.20% of those under age 18 and 12.70% of those age 65 or over.

== Government and infrastructure ==
Jefferson County is one of the eight counties in Alabama with a limited-form of home rule government. A 1973 Commission had recommended that all counties be granted home rule under the state constitution, but the state legislature has refused to give up its control over local affairs.

In the late nineteenth and twentieth centuries, the county was underrepresented politically for decades into the 1960s because the rural-dominated state legislature refused to redistrict as population increased in urban counties. Changes to county representation in the state legislature did not take place until the state was required to incorporate the principle of one man, one vote from the US Supreme Court decision of Baker v. Carr (1964). It ruled that bicameral legislatures had to have both houses based on population districts, rather than geographic ones. The complexity of Birmingham and Jefferson County urban conditions required more local management, as it was a major industrial center. The county gained some home rule functions by 1944. It allows the county to set up a zoning system for land use, maintain the sanitary sewer, sewerage systems and highways, provide for garbage and trash disposal, and to enforce taxation (except for property taxes).

Today the county has a type of council-manager form of government. It is governed by a five-member commission that combines the legislative and executive duties for the county. The Commissioners are elected from single-member districts. Each county commissioner represents one of the five districts in the county, apportioned roughly equally by population. By votes in the commission, the commissioners are given executive responsibilities for the various county departments, which fall under the categories of "Roads and Transportation", "Community Development", "Environmental Services", "Health and Human Services", "Technology and Land Development", and "Finance and General Services". The County Commission elects a President from among its members, who serves as the chairperson of all County Commission meetings, and who has additional executive duties.

The Commission hires a county manager, who oversees and directs daily operations of county departments.

=== Taxation ===
Sales tax on many items within the county can be as high as 12%. The County Commission approved an educational sales tax by a 3–2 vote in October 2004. This was implemented In January 2005, as a 1% sales tax to support funding for construction of needed education facilities. This additional 1% has resulted in some county municipalities, such as Fairfield, to have sales tax rates as high as 10%, while other municipalities and incorporated communities had an increase in their total sales tax rate from 8% to 9%. The state of Alabama sales tax was 4% at the time and Jefferson County's was 2% in total. Some municipal sales taxes reach 4%.

On March 16, 2011, the Alabama Supreme Court ruled that Jefferson County's 2009 occupational tax law was passed unconstitutionally. This decision dealt a devastating financial blow to a county considering bankruptcy.

=== Law ===
Jefferson County is served by the Jefferson County Sheriff's Department. The County Sheriff is chosen by the eligible voters in an at large election. The Sheriff's Department fields about 175 deputy sheriffs who patrol the unincorporated areas of the county, and also all municipalities that do not have their own police departments. The Sheriff's Department has two county jails, one in Birmingham and one in Bessemer, which are used to detain suspects awaiting trial (who cannot afford to post bail), and convicted criminals serving sentences less than one year in length.

Two judicial courthouses are located in Jefferson County, a situation dating to when the state legislature was preparing to split off a portion of Jefferson County to create a new county, centered around Bessemer. The city is located about 16 miles to the southwest by car. The split did not take place because the area of the proposed county would have been smaller than the minimum of 500 square miles set forth in the state constitution. The additional county courthouse and some parallel functions remain in service. The main courthouse is in Birmingham and the second one is located in Bessemer. Certain elected county officials maintain offices in the Bessemer annex, such as the Assistant Tax Collector, the Assistant Tax Assessor, and the Assistant District Attorney.

=== Prisons ===
The local jails have a long history of abuse of prisoners. One former jailer, who started work for the Jefferson County Convict Department in 1919, described beatings, the administration of laxatives, and confinement in a tiny two-by-three-foot cell, as well as beatings with rubber hoses. He said, "You can work a man pretty good with a piece of pipe and never mark him." Well into the 1950s, prisoners were regularly beaten and tortured by police to extract coerced "confessions" to crimes.

In mid-2015, the Department of Justice announced an investigation of the conditions imposed on juveniles in the county jail. It said that young people with mental illnesses were locked in solitary confinement for months at a time. Others were housed with adult prisoners who raped them.

The Alabama Department of Corrections operates the William E. Donaldson Correctional Facility, a prison for men, in unincorporated Jefferson County near Bessemer. The prison includes one of the two Alabama death rows for men.

== Religion ==
In 2010 statistics, the largest religious group in Jefferson County was the SBC Baptists with 185,650 members in 272 congregations, followed by 69,878 non-denominational adherents with 170 congregations, 67,313 NBC Baptists with 117 congregations, 55,083 Catholics in the Roman Catholic Diocese of Birmingham in Alabama with 32 parishes, 43,422 UMC Methodists with 86 congregations, 15,899 CoG–Cleveland, Tennessee Pentecostals with 45 congregations, 14,025 TEC Episcopalians with 17 congregations, 11,267 CoC Christians with 69 congregations, 11,171 CoGiC Pentecostals with 16 congregations, and 9,472 AME Methodists with 42 congregations. Altogether, 83.9% of the population was claimed as members by religious congregations, although members of historically African-American denominations were underrepresented due to incomplete information. In 2014, Jefferson County had 714 religious organizations, the 15th most out of all US counties.

== Education ==
School districts in the county include:

- Bessemer City Schools
- Birmingham City Schools
- Fairfield City Schools
- Homewood City School District
- Hoover City Schools
- Leeds City Schools
- Jefferson County Schools
- Midfield City Schools
- Mountain Brook School System
- Tarrant City Schools
- Trussville City Schools
- Vestavia Hills City Schools

=== History of education ===
As a reaction to the US Supreme Court's ruling in Brown v Board of Education in 1954, that segregated public schools were unconstitutional, both state and local officials took steps to preserve de facto educational segregation. As late as 1965, schools in the county were still totally segregated. In 1969, public schools in the county became fully integrated.

Except for cities such as Birmingham, that have established their own local school districts, all parts of Jefferson County are served by the Jefferson County Board of Education. Parts within Birmingham are served by Birmingham City Schools.

Beginning in 1959, more wealthy towns, with predominately white populations, began to form their own school systems. Critics allege this served to stymie integration and financially starve schools that served mostly black populations. Cities in the county that have established their own school systems are Bessemer, Fairfield, Midfield, Trussville, Homewood, Leeds, Hoover, Vestavia Hills, Tarrant, and Mountain Brook. The pattern of residential and economic segregation has occurred in many parts of the country, including economic segregation of poorer whites.

== Politics ==
Like most urban counties, Jefferson County leans Democratic. It remains the only county in Alabama outside of the Black Belt that votes Democratic. In 2020, Joe Biden received 55.7% of the vote in Jefferson County, the best performance by a Democrat since Franklin Roosevelt in 1944. Before Obama's victory, Jefferson County had last supported the official Democratic candidate for president in 1952, and only once since 1944.

Although the county leans Democratic, the current county commission has a Republican majority.

United States presidential election results for Jefferson County, Alabama
Year	Republican		Democratic		Third party(ies)	
Year	No.	%	No.	%	No.	%
1824	92	20.18%	340	74.56%	24	5.26%
1828	23	4.30%	512	95.70%	0	0.00%
1832	0	0.00%	383	100.00%	0	0.00%
1836	230	30.03%	536	69.97%	0	0.00%
1840	315	35.12%	582	64.88%	0	0.00%
1844	264	31.10%	585	68.90%	0	0.00%
1848	288	42.79%	385	57.21%	0	0.00%
1852	114	25.17%	339	74.83%	0	0.00%
1856	0	0.00%	697	78.05%	196	21.95%
1860	0	0.00%	77	6.68%	1,076	93.32%
1868	420	43.84%	538	56.16%	0	0.00%
1872	1,053	46.65%	1,204	53.35%	0	0.00%
1876	689	24.69%	2,102	75.31%	0	0.00%
1880	781	29.26%	1,712	64.14%	176	6.59%
1884	2,018	47.33%	2,183	51.20%	63	1.48%
1888	3,001	34.84%	5,508	63.95%	104	1.21%
1892	296	1.93%	10,055	65.70%	4,953	32.36%
1896	3,394	26.04%	8,819	67.67%	819	6.28%
1900	2,842	36.81%	4,580	59.32%	299	3.87%
1904	1,090	13.59%	6,424	80.08%	508	6.33%
1908	2,182	20.38%	7,803	72.88%	722	6.74%
1912	693	5.67%	8,887	72.69%	2,646	21.64%
1916	2,052	15.64%	10,677	81.38%	391	2.98%
1920	7,124	21.63%	24,982	75.84%	833	2.53%
1924	5,678	23.88%	15,133	63.64%	2,969	12.49%
1928	18,060	51.74%	16,735	47.94%	112	0.32%
1932	4,572	12.51%	31,156	85.27%	811	2.22%
1936	3,813	9.49%	35,982	89.51%	403	1.00%
1940	6,714	15.26%	37,110	84.34%	177	0.40%
1944	7,409	19.15%	31,101	80.40%	174	0.45%
1948	7,261	19.18%	0	0.00%	30,600	80.82%
1952	32,254	45.58%	38,111	53.85%	401	0.57%
1956	43,695	49.93%	38,604	44.11%	5,214	5.96%
1960	60,004	56.66%	44,369	41.90%	1,525	1.44%
1964	100,756	72.57%	0	0.00%	38,082	27.43%
1968	39,752	19.39%	55,845	27.24%	109,436	53.37%
1972	135,095	68.05%	57,288	28.86%	6,145	3.10%
1976	113,590	52.32%	99,531	45.85%	3,969	1.83%
1980	132,612	51.10%	113,069	43.57%	13,831	5.33%
1984	158,362	59.41%	107,506	40.33%	679	0.25%
1988	148,879	57.74%	107,766	41.80%	1,188	0.46%
1992	149,832	50.13%	125,889	42.12%	23,163	7.75%
1996	130,980	50.20%	120,208	46.07%	9,718	3.72%
2000	138,491	50.59%	129,889	47.45%	5,383	1.97%
2004	158,680	54.16%	132,286	45.15%	2,001	0.68%
2008	149,921	47.07%	166,121	52.15%	2,482	0.78%
2012	141,683	46.53%	159,876	52.50%	2,964	0.97%
2016	134,768	44.30%	156,873	51.57%	12,550	4.13%
2020	138,843	42.61%	181,688	55.76%	5,317	1.63%
2024	131,123	43.90%	162,112	54.27%	5,469	1.83%

United States Senate election results for Jefferson County, Alabama2
Year	Republican		Democratic		Third party(ies)	
Year	No.	%	No.	%	No.	%
2020	134,314	41.26%	190,644	58.57%	552	0.17%

United States Senate election results for Jefferson County, Alabama3
Year	Republican		Democratic		Third party(ies)	
Year	No.	%	No.	%	No.	%
2022	91,802	46.40%	100,792	50.95%	5,238	2.65%

Alabama Gubernatorial election results for Jefferson County
Year	Republican		Democratic		Third party(ies)	
Year	No.	%	No.	%	No.	%
2022	92,583	46.86%	96,175	48.68%	8,809	4.46%

== Transportation ==
=== Major highways ===
- Interstate 20
- Interstate 22
- Interstate 59
- Interstate 65
- Future Interstate 222
- Future Interstate 422
- Interstate 459
- U.S. Route 11 / State Route 7 (unsigned)
- U.S. Route 31 / State Route 3 (unsigned)
- U.S. Route 78 / State Route 4 (unsigned)
- U.S. Route 280 / State Route 38 (unsigned)
- U.S. Route 411
- State Route 5
- State Route 25
- State Route 75
- State Route 79
- State Route 119
- State Route 149
- State Route 150
- State Route 151
- State Route 269
- State Route 378

=== Railroads ===
Amtrak passenger service is provided by the Crescent, which stops in Birmingham. Freight service is provided by BNSF Railway, CSX Transportation, Norfolk Southern Railway, Alabama & Tennessee River Railway and Birmingham Terminal Railway (formerly Birmingham Southern Railroad). There is also one switching and terminal railroad, Alabama Warrior Railway.

=== Air travel ===
Birmingham is the location of the Birmingham-Shuttlesworth International Airport, which provides service, either direct or connecting, to most of the rest of the United States.

== Communities ==
=== Cities ===
- Adamsville
- Bessemer
- Birmingham (county seat; partly in Shelby County)
- Brighton
- Center Point
- Clay
- Fairfield
- Fultondale
- Gardendale
- Graysville
- Helena (mostly in Shelby County)
- Homewood
- Hoover (partly in Shelby County)
- Hueytown
- Irondale
- Kimberly
- Leeds (partly in Shelby County and St. Clair County)
- Lipscomb
- Mountain Brook
- Pinson
- Pleasant Grove
- Sumiton (partly in Walker County)
- Tarrant
- Trussville (partly in St. Clair County)
- Vestavia Hills (partly in Shelby County)
- Warrior (partly in Blount County)

=== Towns ===
- Argo (partly in St. Clair County)
- Brookside
- Cardiff
- County Line (partly in Blount County)
- Lake View (partly in Tuscaloosa County)
- Maytown
- Midfield
- Morris
- Mulga
- North Johns
- Sylvan Springs
- Trafford
- West Jefferson

=== Census-designated places ===
- Chalkville (former; annexed by city of Clay)
- Concord
- Edgewater
- Forestdale
- Grayson Valley
- McCalla
- McDonald Chapel
- Minor
- Mount Olive
- Rock Creek

=== Unincorporated communities ===
- Adger
- Alton
- Bayview
- Bagley
- Bradford
- Coalburg
- Corner
- Crumley Chapel
- Docena
- Dolomite
- Flat Top
- Hopewell
- Kimbrell
- New Castle
- Palmerdale (neighborhood of Pinson, Alabama)
- Robbins Crossroads
- Sayre
- Shannon
- Watson

=== Former towns ===
- Acipcoville (former community, now a neighborhood in Birmingham)
- Elyton (former Jefferson County seat, now a neighborhood in Birmingham)
- Ensley (former town, now a neighborhood in Birmingham)
- North Birmingham (former city, now a neighborhood in Birmingham)
- Westfield (former company town, now an unincorporated community)
- Woodlawn (former city, now a neighborhood in Birmingham)

== See also ==
- Jefferson County Library Cooperative
- National Register of Historic Places listings in Jefferson County, Alabama
