= Brookside, Alabama =

- Town
- Seal

- Location in Jefferson County and Alabama
- Coordinates: 33°38′14″N 86°53′50″W
- Country: United States
- State: Alabama
- County: Jefferson

Area
  - Total: 6.32 sq mi (16.38 km^{2})
  - Land: 6.31 sq mi (16.35 km^{2})
  - Water: 0.012 sq mi (0.03 km^{2})
- Elevation: 597 ft (182 m)

Population (2020)
  - Total: 1,253
  - Density: 198.5/sq mi (76.64/km^{2})
- Time zone: UTC-6 (Central (CST))
  - Summer (DST): UTC-5 (CDT)
- ZIP code: 35036
- Area codes: 205 & 659
- FIPS code: 01-09736
- GNIS feature ID: 2405331
- Website: townofbrookside.com

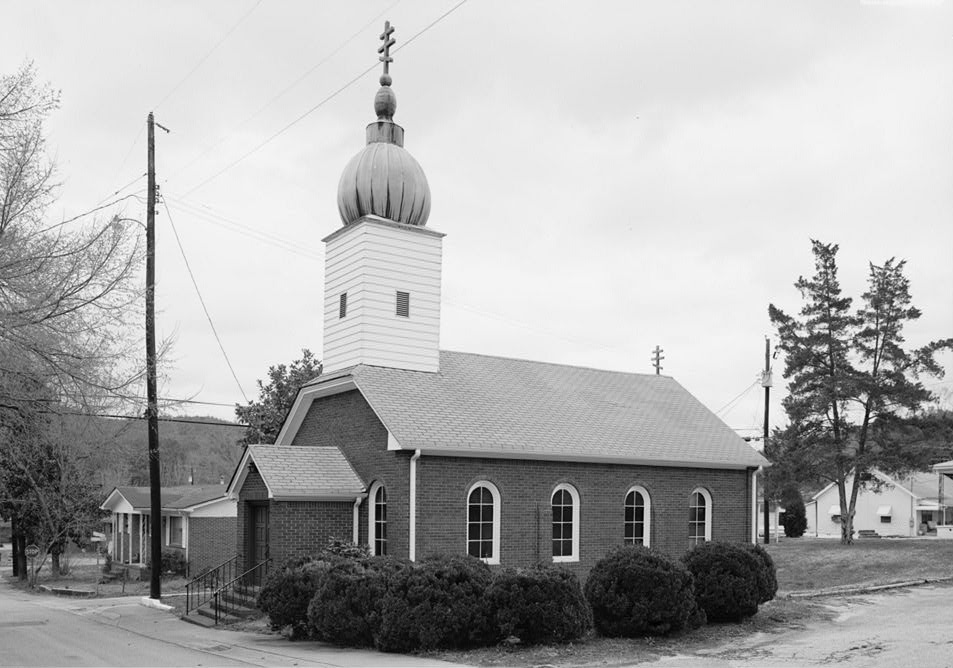
St. Nicholas Russian Orthodox Church in Brookside (erected 1916, renovated 1965)

Brookside is a town in north-central Jefferson County, Alabama, United States. As of the 2020 census, the population of the town was 1,253. It is a former mining town.

== History ==
The Brookside mine was opened in 1886 by the Coalburg Coal and Coke Company. It was purchased one year later by the Sloss Iron and Steel Company as a source of fuel for their blast furnaces in Birmingham. Following the practice of the time, the mined coal was processed into coke in rows of beehive ovens banked into the hillside below the mine opening. In 1897 a Robinson-Ramsey Coal Washer was installed, increasing the efficiency of coke burning and therefore the overall efficiency of the mine. Other advanced equipment was also installed at Brookside, placing it at the forefront of mining technology in the Birmingham District at the turn of the century.

Brookside served as the headquarters for four Sloss-owned mines in the immediate area (Cardiff, Coalburg, Brazil and Brookside). Because the capacity of Brookside's processing equipment exceeded the mine output, some of the slack from the Brazil mine was brought to Brookside for washing and coking.

Brookside was incorporated in 1898. The descriptive name Brookside stems from the Five-Mile Creek that flows through the town.

Sloss, like other employers in the booming industrial expansion of the early 20th century, had difficulty recruiting skilled labor. Recruitment efforts extended internationally and Brookside became the home of many Czechoslovak immigrants and their families who made their way to the mines. As Brookside became a destination for Eastern European miners in the area, the culture of the town reflected their ethnic traditions. A Russian Orthodox church was founded and served to strengthen community ties. This church was one of the first Russian Orthodox churches built south of the Mason-Dixon. Unlike other mines where skilled whites and unskilled blacks could be played against each other by the owners, the Brookside miners were tightly organized and carried out a successful (albeit violent) strike in 1906.

Between 1910 and 1920, mining operations jumped around to several seams and the number of miners fluctuated between a low of 54 in 1910 and a high of over 600 in 1914. In 1913 the mechanical coal cutters used previously were supplanted by hand picks. A new church building for St. Nicholas was completed in 1916. The 1920 Alabama coal strike, combined with a global depreciation in the coal market, led to a shutdown of the mine. When the strike was settled in 1921, Brookside mine was never re-opened.

Sloss removed all of the surface works and held on to the mine property. In 1952 Sloss merged with the U.S. Pipe and Foundry Company, a subsidiary of Jim Walter Industries since 1969.

=== Saint Nicholas Russian Orthodox Church ===
Brookside remains a small town with a distinct Eastern European flavor. Founded in 1894, its onion dome church was re-faced with brick in 1965 and still holds services for approximately 70 congregants. The annual Russian/Slavic Food Festival, observed the first full weekend of each November, brings visitors to tour the temple, see traditional Eastern European dances, and buy plate lunches and baked goods prepared by the Sisterhood of Saint Olga.

== Geography ==
Brookside lies along the banks of Five Mile Creek, a tributary of the Locust Fork of the Black Warrior River, in the southern end of the Cumberland Plateau.

According to the U.S. Census Bureau, the town has a total area of 6.0 square miles (16 km^{2}), of which 6.0 square miles (16 km^{2}) are land and 0.17% is water.

== Government ==
=== Police ===
In 2022, an investigative report by John Archibald of AL.com (the website of The Birmingham News, The Huntsville Times, and the Press-Register of Mobile) uncovered a surge in Brookside Police's aggressive and arbitrary ticketing of motorists passing through the city. Brookside had an unusually high ratio of police officers to residents (nine officers in a 1,253-person town, or one officer for every 144 residents), having grown from just one officer in 2018. In 2020 its officers, who drove unmarked cars and wore uniforms without Brookside insignia, made more arrests for misdemeanors than it has residents. The town went from towing 50 vehicles in 2018 to 789 in 2020. These tickets cost motorists thousands of dollars and have become the city's largest source of revenue. In 2021, more than half of Brookside's revenues stemmed from fines and forfeitures. The town and police department are now defending several lawsuits which have accused Brookside police of fabricating charges and making up laws in order to produce more ticket revenue. One federal lawsuit alleges malicious prosecution of a pastor and his sister, who were charged with impersonating police officers, in retaliation for their having filed a complaint that a Brookside officer allegedly stopped the pastor and used a racist slur against him. The police have written over 400 fines in two years for driving in the left lane despite it not being illegal.

On January 25, 2022, Brookside Police Chief Mike Jones resigned "in the wake of revelations" over the reported policing policy. Elected representatives and officials on both sides of the Alabama Legislature committed to challenging "aggressive policing and churning of often-minor traffic stops" by Brookside Police Department, including Republican Lt. Gov. Will Ainsworth and Democratic Party chair Chris England. A Newsweek article reiterated the accusations and reported that Brookside mayor Mike Bryan called the town's policing "a positive story," saying of the reports that "Everybody's got a story" and "99% of them are lying." Mark Levie Pettway, sheriff for the overarching Jefferson County, stated that "I wouldn’t be surprised if they (FBI) opened up an investigation. You can’t do what’s going on over there."

One person claimed that an officer wore "a Norse sign sometimes appropriated by white supremacists – on a ring and one of his gun clips." AL.com later reported that at least seven officers had left the department, and that the remainder had adopted new uniforms and vehicles to present a less-paramilitary appearance.

The Jefferson County district attorney and criminal courts have thrown out cases originating in Brookside, including traffic offenses and drug felonies, citing Brookside police officers' lack of credibility as witnesses.

The "reports of abuses" by the Brookside Police department caught the attention of the Alabama Senate, which unanimously passed a bill limiting the amount of money cities can keep from fines.

On February 9, 2026, Brookside agreed to pay $1.5 million to settle a civil rights lawsuit brought by The Institute for Justice on behalf of motorists caught in the town's speed trap. The settlement will require Brookside to stop many of the financial incentives tied to traffic enforcement and the Brookside Police Department will stay off the nearby interstate for the next 10 years except for emergency response.

== Demographics ==
Historical population
Census	Pop.	Note	%±
1890	380		—
1900	658		73.2%
1910	623		−5.3%
1920	666		6.9%
1930	466		−30.0%
1940	714		53.2%
1950	733		2.7%
1960	999		36.3%
1970	990		−0.9%
1980	1,409		42.3%
1990	1,365		−3.1%
2000	1,393		2.1%
2010	1,363		−2.2%
2020	1,253		−8.1%
U.S. Decennial Census; 2013 Estimate

=== Racial and ethnic composition ===
Brookside town, Alabama – Racial and ethnic composition Note: the US Census treats Hispanic/Latino as an ethnic category. This table excludes Latinos from the racial categories and assigns them to a separate category. Hispanics/Latinos may be of any race. Race and ethnicity were not surveyed for populations under 2,500 in 1980 and under 1,000 in 1990.
Race / Ethnicity (NH = Non-Hispanic)	Pop 1990	Pop 2000	Pop 2010	Pop 2020	% 1990	% 2000	% 2010	% 2020
White alone (NH)	1,266	1,253	1,077	891	92.75%	89.95%	79.02%	71.11%
Black or African American alone (NH)	95	116	251	266	6.96%	8.33%	18.42%	21.23%
Native American or Alaska Native alone (NH)	1	5	4	2	0.07%	0.36%	0.29%	0.16%
Asian alone (NH)	0	0	1	4	0.00%	0.00%	0.07%	0.32%
Native Hawaiian or Pacific Islander alone (NH)	x	0	0	0	x	0.00%	0.00%	0.00%
Other race alone (NH)	0	2	3	6	0.00%	0.14%	0.22%	0.48%
Mixed race or Multiracial (NH)	x	4	18	51	x	0.29%	1.32%	4.07%
Hispanic or Latino (any race)	3	13	9	33	0.22%	0.93%	0.66%	2.63%
Total	1,365	1,393	1,363	1,253	100.00%	100.00%	100.00%	100.00%

=== 2020 census ===
As of the 2020 census, Brookside had a population of 1,253.

The median age was 40.8 years. 23.9% of residents were under the age of 18 and 18.0% of residents were 65 years of age or older. For every 100 females there were 93.4 males, and for every 100 females age 18 and over there were 89.1 males age 18 and over.

66.6% of residents lived in urban areas, while 33.4% lived in rural areas.

There were 496 households in Brookside, and 329 were families. Of all households, 32.7% had children under the age of 18 living in them, 38.9% were married-couple households, 19.2% were households with a male householder and no spouse or partner present, and 36.1% were households with a female householder and no spouse or partner present. About 26.0% of all households were made up of individuals, and 10.3% had someone living alone who was 65 years of age or older.

There were 562 housing units, of which 11.7% were vacant. The homeowner vacancy rate was 0.6% and the rental vacancy rate was 10.6%.

=== 2010 census ===
At the 2010 census, there were 1,363 people, 521 households, and 381 families living in the town. The population density was 227.2 inhabitants per square mile (87.7/km^{2}). There were 577 housing units at an average density of 96.2 per square mile (37.1/km^{2}). The racial makeup of the town was 79.5% White, 18.5% Black or African American, 0.3% Native American, 0.2% from other races, and 1.4% from two or more races. 0.7% of the population were Hispanic or Latino of any race.

Of the 521 households, 30.1% had children under the age of 18 living with them, 44.7% were married couples living together, 21.1% had a female householder with no husband present, and 26.9% were non-families. 23.2% of households were one person and 7.7% were one person aged 65 or older. The average household size was 2.62 and the average family size was 3.07.

The age distribution was 25.5% under the age of 18, 8.6% from 18 to 24, 24.5% from 25 to 44, 29.9% from 45 to 64, and 11.4% 65 or older. The median age was 38 years. For every 100 females, there were 88.0 males. For every 100 females age 18 and over, there were 94.3 males.

The median household income was $41,848 and the median family income was $55,833. Males had a median income of $50,473 versus $31,208 for females. The per capita income for the town was $21,486. About 13.1% of the families and 14.5% of the population were below the poverty line, including 13.3% of those under age 18 and 21.1% of those aged 65 or over.

=== 2000 census ===
At the 2000 census, there were 1,393 people, 546 households, and 393 families living in the town. The population density was 232.8 inhabitants per square mile (89.9/km^{2}). There were 613 housing units at an average density of 102.4 per square mile (39.5/km^{2}). The racial makeup of the town was 90.52% White, 8.69% Black or African American, 0.36% Native American, 0.14% from other races, and 0.29% from two or more races. 0.93% of the population were Hispanic or Latino of any race.

Of the 546 households 31.7% had children under the age of 18 living with them, 51.6% were married couples living together, 15.8% had a female householder with no husband present, and 28.0% were non-families. 26.2% of households were one person and 10.8% were one person aged 65 or older. The average household size was 2.55 and the average family size was 3.08.

The age distribution was 24.8% under the age of 18, 9.4% from 18 to 24, 28.6% from 25 to 44, 24.3% from 45 to 64, and 12.8% 65 or older. The median age was 37 years. For every 100 females, there were 94.0 males. For every 100 females age 18 and over, there were 91.8 males.

The median household income was $29,792 and the median family income was $34,821. Males had a median income of $30,900 versus $21,563 for females. The per capita income for the town was $14,242. About 14.7% of families and 18.2% of the population were below the poverty line, including 30.6% of those under age 18 and 16.7% of those age 65 or over.
