= Pleasant Grove, Alabama =

City in Alabama, United States

- City
- Nickname: The Good Neighbor City
- Location of Pleasant Grove in Jefferson County, Alabama
- Coordinates: 33°29′33″N 86°59′23″W
- Country: United States
- State: Alabama
- County: Jefferson
- Established: 1889
- Incorporated: January 16, 1934

Area
  - Total: 9.82 sq mi (25.44 km^{2})
  - Land: 9.82 sq mi (25.44 km^{2})
  - Water: 0 sq mi (0.00 km^{2})
- Elevation: 673 ft (205 m)

Population (2020)
  - Total: 9,544
  - Estimate (2022): 9,446
  - Density: 962/sq mi (371.3/km^{2})
- Time zone: UTC−6 (Central (CST))
  - Summer (DST): UTC−5 (CDT)
- ZIP Code: 35127
- Area codes: 205 and 659
- FIPS code: 01-61008
- GNIS feature ID: 2404538
- Website: cityofpg.com

Pleasant Grove is a city in western Jefferson County, Alabama, United States. It is part of the Birmingham metropolitan area. The population was 9,544 at the 2020 census.

== History ==
It was established in 1889 but incorporated as a city on January 16, 1934. The incorporation came about by reason of a rather unusual circumstance. The town sits on land honeycombed by coal mines. For many years, the residents had relied on water wells for their water supply. As years passed and more mining was done, Pleasant Grove found itself confronted with a problem. Residents would sometimes go to their well to draw water only to find there was none. The water had gone into the mines.

During the mid to late 1930s, the Federal Government had a program for financing the building of local water systems. In exploring the possibility of securing such funds, it was revealed that in order to secure such financing a community must be legally incorporated. At this time the incorporation became a reality.

The first appointed Mayor of Pleasant Grove was W.P. Stone. The city is governed by a mayor and five council members who serve four-year terms. Elections for city officials is held during the summer of each leap year with four-year terms beginning the first Monday in October. The area known as Pleasant Grove, Alabama was first homesteaded in September 1836. Pleasant Grove is in Jefferson County. Although no one seems to know when or exactly how the town came by its name, old documents indicate that at least part of this area was called Pleasant Grove as early as 1884. Pleasant Grove was made up of four communities which included Frog Pond, Lizard Ridge, Cottage Hill, and Pleasant Grove.

The city was damaged by large tornadoes in 1956, 1977, 1998, and 2011.

== Government ==
Pleasant Grove is governed by a mayor and a five-member city council. The city government is located at 501 Park Road, Pleasant Grove, Alabama 35127.

As of 2026, the mayor is Yolanda Lawson. The city council members listed by the city are Regina Vann Williams, Geno Brown, Ray Lassiter, J. Stevens Wilkerson, and Jacquese Gary. Williams is listed as mayor pro tem.

== Geography ==
According to the United States Census Bureau, the city has a total area of 9.82 square miles (25.4 km^{2}), all land.

Pleasant Grove is home to Milk Creek, so named for its creamy-white color and thick, calcious texture.

== Education ==
Pleasant Grove Schools are operated by the Jefferson County Board of Education. Land was originally given to the Board of Education and a gift of $150,000 toward the construction of a Junior High School. In 1970, Pleasant Grove High School was built. It combined with the Junior High School. The schools were accredited by the State of Alabama in May 1973. It agreed to give the Board of Education $1,00 over a ten-year period to add onto the existing Elementary School and get all of the children K-6 under one roof. In January 1997, students who formerly attended Woodward School were relocated to the city.

Construction of a new Pleasant Grove High School was completed in 2010. Pleasant Grove High School has the highest graduation rate in the Jefferson County School system. There are four Nationally Certified teachers on staff, and the remainder of the staff is highly qualified as per Alabama Board of Education standards. The old high school is now the JCIB Middle School.

== Demographics ==
Historical population
Census	Pop.	Note	%±
1940	1,066		—
1950	1,802		69.0%
1960	3,097		71.9%
1970	5,090		64.4%
1980	7,102		39.5%
1990	8,458		19.1%
2000	9,983		18.0%
2010	10,110		1.3%
2020	9,544		−5.6%
2025 (est.)	9,346	▼	−2.1%
U.S. Decennial Census; 2020 Census

=== Racial and ethnic composition ===
Pleasant Grove city, Alabama – Racial and ethnic composition Note: the US Census treats Hispanic/Latino as an ethnic category. This table excludes Latinos from the racial categories and assigns them to a separate category. Hispanics/Latinos may be of any race.
Race / Ethnicity (NH = Non-Hispanic)	Pop 2000	Pop 2010	Pop 2020	% 2000	% 2010	% 2020
White alone (NH)	8,439	5,406	3,252	84.53%	53.47%	34.07%
Black or African American alone (NH)	1,435	4,524	5,917	14.37%	44.75%	62.00%
Native American or Alaska Native alone (NH)	19	29	20	0.19%	0.29%	0.21%
Asian alone (NH)	15	18	8	0.21%	0.21%	0.08%
Native Hawaiian or Pacific Islander alone (NH)	0	1	3	0.00%	0.07%	0.03%
Other race alone (NH)	10	68	10	0.10%	0.67%	0.10%
Mixed race or Multiracial (NH)	37	68	201	0.37%	0.67%	2.11%
Hispanic or Latino (any race)	28	57	133	0.28%	0.56%	1.39%
Total	9,983	10,110	9,544	100.00%	100.00%	100.00%

=== 2020 census ===
As of the 2020 census, Pleasant Grove had a population of 9,544. The median age was 42.9 years. 21.3% of residents were under the age of 18 and 18.3% were 65 years of age or older. For every 100 females, there were 87.0 males, and for every 100 females age 18 and over, there were 83.9 males age 18 and over.

The population density was 971.6 inhabitants per square mile (375.1/km^{2}). 98.0% of residents lived in urban areas, while 2.0% lived in rural areas.

There were 3,605 households, including 2,598 families, in Pleasant Grove. Of all households, 31.8% had children under the age of 18 living in them, 47.2% were married-couple households, 15.8% had a male householder and no spouse or partner present, and 33.5% had a female householder and no spouse or partner present. About 24.6% of all households were made up of individuals, and 11.1% had someone living alone who was 65 years of age or older.

There were 3,777 housing units, of which 4.6% were vacant. The homeowner vacancy rate was 1.6%, and the rental vacancy rate was 10.0%.

=== 2010 census ===
As of the 2010 census, there were 10,110 people, 3,715 households, and 2,857 families living in the city. The population density was 1,148.9 inhabitants per square mile (443.6/km^{2}). There were 3,946 housing units at an average density of 448.4 per square mile (173.1/km^{2}). The racial makeup of the city was 53.7% White, 44.8% Black or African American, 0.3% Native American, 0.2% Asian, 0.2% from other races, and 0.7% from two or more races. Hispanic or Latino of any race were 0.6% of the population.

Of the 3,715 households 32.1% had children under the age of 18 living with them, 58.4% were married couples living together, 14.4% had a female householder with no husband present, and 23.1% were non-families. 21.0% of households were one person and 9.8% were one person aged 65 or older. The average household size was 2.67 and the average family size was 3.09.

The age distribution was 23.8% under the age of 18, 7.7% from 18 to 24, 23.2% from 25 to 44, 30.1% from 45 to 64, and 15.1% 65 or older. The median age was 41.2 years. For every 100 females, there were 90.9 males. For every 100 females age 18 and over, there were 92.1 males.

The median household income was $66,681 and the median family income was $72,341. Males had a median income of $45,587 versus $40,830 for females. The per capita income for the city was $26,833. About 2.8% of families and 2.0% of the population were below the poverty line, including .5% of those under age 18 and 2.6% of those age 65 or over.

=== 2000 census ===
As of the 2000 census, there were 9,983 people, 3,570 households, and 2,909 families living in the city. The population density was 1,129.9 inhabitants per square mile (436.3/km^{2}). There were 3,717 housing units at an average density of 420.7 per square mile (162.4/km^{2}). The racial makeup of the city was 84.67% White, 14.44% Black or African American, 0.19% Native American, 0.15% Asian, 0.16% from other races, and 0.38% from two or more races. Hispanic or Latino of any race were 0.28% of the population.

Of the 3,570 households 37.8% had children under the age of 18 living with them, 70.7% were married couples living together, 8.3% had a female householder with no husband present, and 18.5% were non-families. 17.4% of households were one person and 9.6% were one person aged 65 or older. The average household size was 2.72 and the average family size was 3.08.

The age distribution was 24.4% under the age of 18, 7.1% from 18 to 24, 27.0% from 25 to 44, 25.6% from 45 to 64, and 15.8% 65 or older. The median age was 40 years. For every 100 females, there were 90.2 males. For every 100 females age 18 and over, there were 86.6 males.

The median household income was $52,776 and the median family income was $59,132. Males had a median income of $38,544 versus $28,519 for females. The per capita income for the city was $20,774. About 3.2% of families and 3.8% of the population were below the poverty line, including 4.2% of those under age 18 and 4.4% of those age 65 or over.

== Notable people ==
- R. G. Armstrong, actor and playwright
- James Bradberry, cornerback for the Philadelphia Eagles
- Jake Elmore, former Major League Baseball Player
