= Tarrant High School =

Location
- 91 Black Creek Road; Tarrant, Alabama 35217; United States; 33.6141°N 86.7730°W

Information
- Type: Public
- Motto: Learning + service = success
- Established: 1917 (109 years ago)
- School district: Tarrant City Schools
- CEEB code: 012610
- Principal: Kelvin Luster
- Teaching staff: 35.50 (on an FTE basis)
- Grades: 7-12
- Enrollment: 579 (2023-24)
- Student to teacher ratio: 16.31
- Campus type: Suburban
- Colors: Navy blue and gold
- Athletics: AHSAA Class 4A
- Nickname: Wildcats
- Feeder schools: Tarrant Intermediate School
- Website: ths.tarrant.k12.al.us

Tarrant High School (THS) is a fourteenth-year public high school in the city of Tarrant, Alabama. It is the only high school in the Tarrant City School System. School colors are navy blue and gold, and the athletic teams are called the Wildcats. THS competes in AHSAA Class 4A athletics.

THS was established in 1917 as Jefferson County High School and was administered by the Jefferson County School System. It became part of the Tarrant City School System in 1948, at which point its name was changed to Tarrant High School.

== Campus ==
THS is located on a 98-acre site at 91 Black Creek Road in Tarrant, formerly the site of Glenn Ireland 11 Development. The 112,000 square foot building was built to combine facilities for the existing Tarrant High School and Tarrant Middle School. The $17 million building was designed by McElrath & Oliver Architects of Gadsden and built by Golden & Associates Construction. The school has 36 classrooms, and competition and practice gymnasiums. Groundbreaking for construction was held on July 11, 2008, and it opened for the 2009–10 school year.

== Student Profile ==
Enrollment in grades 7-12 for the 2013–14 school year is 472 students. Approximately 79% of students are African-American, 11% are Hispanic, 9% are white, and 1% are multiracial. Roughly 95% of students qualify for free or reduced price lunch.

THS has a graduation rate of 77%. Approximately 65% of its students meet or exceed state proficiency standards in mathematics, and 75% meet or exceed standards in reading. The average ACT score for THS students is 20.

== Athletics ==
THS competes in AHSAA Class 3A athletics and fields teams in the following sports:

- Baseball
- Basketball
- Cheerleading
- Football
- Softball
- Volleyball
- Track and Field

THS has won state championships in baseball (1979) and football (1964 and 1971).

== Notable alumni ==
Mario Addison, NFL player
