= Birmingham tornado =

Several tornadoes have been known as the Birmingham tornado.

== Birmingham, Alabama, United States ==
- 1956 McDonald Chapel tornado, an F4 tornado which struck Jefferson County, Alabama, killing 25 and injuring 200
- Tornado outbreak of April 1977, an F5 tornado which struck the northern suburbs of Jefferson County, Alabama, killing 22 and injuring 125
- 1998 Oak Grove–Birmingham tornado, an F5 tornado which affected the western and northern suburbs of Birmingham killing 32
- 2011 Tuscaloosa–Birmingham tornado, an EF4 tornado which caused major damage in Tuscaloosa and large portions of the northern and western suburbs of Birmingham, killing 64 people
- 2012 Center Point–Clay tornado, an EF3 tornado in the Birmingham suburbs
- 2021 Fultondale tornado, a deadly EF3 tornado in the Birmingham suburbs

== Birmingham, England, United Kingdom ==
- 1931 Birmingham tornado, an F3 tornado which killed one person and damaged hundreds of structures in the city of Birmingham
- 2005 Birmingham tornado, the costliest in United Kingdom history, which caused significant damage in the city of Birmingham
