= 2021 Fultondale tornado =

2021 tornado in Alabama, U.S.

- The tornado in Fultondale, seen amidst a power flash

Meteorological history
- Formed: January 25, 2021, 11:40 p.m. CDT (UTC−05:00)
- Dissipated: January 25, 2021, 11:55 p.m. CDT (UTC−05:00)
- Duration: 15 minutes

EF3 tornado
- on the Enhanced Fujita scale
- Max width: 900 yards (820 m)
- Path length: 10.41 miles (16.75 km)
- Highest winds: 150 mph (240 km/h)

Overall effects
- Fatalities: 1
- Injuries: 30
- Areas affected: Fultondale, Alabama and Center Point, Alabama
- Part of the Tornadoes of 2021

In the late evening hours of January 25, 2021, a large and intense tornado hit the cities of Fultondale and Center Point, both located north of Birmingham, Alabama. The tornado, which was on the ground for 10 miles (16 km), inflicted extensive damage to homes and businesses, reaching a maximum intensity of EF3 on the Enhanced Fujita scale. The tornado damaged 265 homes and killed one person who was sheltering in a basement. Fultondale was previously hit by an EF4 tornado on April 27, 2011; the 2021 tornado tracked just north of the 2011 tornado.

The tornado touched down at 11:40 pm CDT, producing EF0-rated damage to homes and trees while slowly picking up in intensity. The tornado damaged a Hampton Inn & Suites on Fulton Road as it rapidly intensified, inflicting EF2 damage to power poles and homes. Another motel was hit by the tornado as it reached EF3 intensity for the first time over Lykes Boulevard. The tornado, at this point maintaining wind speeds estimated to have been as high as 150 miles per hour (240 km/h), began to shatter storefront windows and deroof homes. The tornado reached its peak intensity on Oak Street and New Castle Road, impacting a row of homes at EF3 intensity and shifting at least one home off its foundation. One person, a 14-year-old, was killed while sheltering inside of a basement. The tornado continued to inflict heavy damage to structures before lifting near Country View Court at 11:55 pm, shortly before midnight.

== Meteorological synopsis ==
No risk area was outlined in the Storm Prediction Center's (SPC) Day 3 convective outlook on January 23, which only featured a large area of "TSTM" risk. The outlook noted that "Severe storms are not expected on Monday across the CONUS". The Day 2 outlook on January 24 saw a 2% chance of tornadoes being outlined in Eastern Texas and Western Louisiana. In addition, a large 5% chance of hail was outlined across Eastern Texas, Western Louisiana, far-northwestern Mississippi, Southeastern Oklahoma, a large portion of Arkansas, and the Missouri-Indiana-Kentucky Tri-state area. As a result of the threats, the SPC upgraded the original outlook of "no severe thunderstorms" to a "marginal", level 1-out-of-5 risk for portions of Oklahoma, Texas, Louisiana, Arkansas, Tennessee, Kentucky, Missouri, Kentucky and Illinois. Alabama was not included in the risk area. A later update of the outlook on the same day saw the marginal risk area shift eastward, now covering Southern Indiana and much of Tennessee. The risk area also covered part of Lauderdale County, Alabama, although Fultondale and the Birmingham metropolitan area were not in the risk area.

The updated Day 1 outlook on January 25, showing a slight risk area in parts of Alabama

The Day 1 convective outlook, released by the SPC on January 25, saw a "slight", level 2-out-of-5 risk area outlined for Southern Oklahoma and Northern Texas. Although the 2% tornado risk remained, the SPC upgraded the 5% wind and hail risks to 15%, covering the slight risk area. Alabama was no longer in a marginal risk area, with the risk being retracted. Shortly after, the slight risk area was retracted and the marginal risk area was re-introduced to northwestern Alabama. A 2% tornado risk was also included in the marginal risk area. The marginal risk area was expanded southward later in the day, covering much of Alabama and putting the Birmingham metropolitan area in a 2% tornado risk. The final Day 1 risk issued on January 25 saw a slight risk area introduced to Northwestern Alabama, Middle Tennessee and portions of Mississippi. A 5% tornado risk was included in the slight risk area; Fultondale and Birmingham were not included in the risk.

Shortly after, Tornado Watch #3 was issued for 27 counties in Alabama, including Jefferson, where Fultondale is located. The watch outlined a 50% chance of two or more tornadoes within the watched area, but only a 20% chance of one or more strong (EF2+) tornadoes. The watch also outlined a 70% chance of "6 or more combined severe hail/wind events" occurring within the watched area.

== Tornado summary ==
EF1 damage to a Hampton Inn & Suites on Fulton Road

The tornado first touched down at 11:40 pm on Summit Circle and Chapel Hills Parkway, immediately producing EF0-rated damage to homes. The tornado partially deroofed a home and stripped its gutter off on the Parkway. The tornado then moved over West Park Drive and Chapel Hill Trail, maintaining EF0 intensity while slowly becoming wider. The tornado snapped branches off trees as it again moved over the Chapel Hill parkway; wind speeds as the tornado moved over the parkway were estimated to have been 75 miles per hour (121 km/h). It continued to inflict EF0 damage to homes on Ellard Road before moving over Virginia Avenue. An apartment complex suffered visible damage on Walker Chapel Circle, being clipped by the tornado's northern edge. After crossing I-65 and bending a flag pole on Howell Street, the tornado rapidly intensified, reaching EF2 strength over Fulton Road. A flagpole was destroyed outside of the Hampton Inn & Suites Fultondale, and an Outback Steakhouse across the street suffered EF0-rated roof damage.

EF2 damage to a home on Lykes Boulevard

The tornado maintained EF2 intensity as it crossed Head Road and Norris Circle, impacting a Fairfield by Marriott motel. EF2 damage was inflicted to homes on Bell Drive before the tornado crossed King Court, tracking north of the Fulton Police Department. The tornado continued inflicting EF2 damage to trees and homes as it passed over US 31, before producing EF1 damage to homes and trees on Republic Avenue. The tornado again intensified over Lykes Boulevard, destroying several houses at EF3 intensity. The tornado cut a small swath of EF3 damage stretching from Lykes Boulevard, where a large tree fell on a resident's leg, to Fulton Drive before weakening to EF2 intensity over the Black Creek. The garage of a home on Georgetown Lane suffered a collapse as the tornado moved over the area. In addition to roof and garage damage, the tornado shattered storefront windows while maintaining 96-mile-per-hour (154 km/h) winds.

Track and intensity map of the tornado through residential areas east of US 31 Key EF0 65–85 mph EF1 86–110 mph EF2 111–135 mph EF3 136–165 mph ⎯ Center of the tornado

EF3 intensity was reached for a second time as the tornado impacted a residential area on Nelda Circle, where homes were deroofed and one home was shifted entirely off its foundation. Trees were debarked on Melba Lane, and a home was destroyed. Rows of homes were destroyed at EF3 intensity on Oak Street and New Castle Road, with wind speeds reaching as high as 150 miles per hour (240 km/h) in the area. Tree trunks were snapped at EF2 intensity by tornadic winds as the tornado tracked over Cedar Street; at this point the tornado was beginning to turn eastward. One person was killed on Oak Street while sheltering in a basement.

It weakened as it moved over Carson Road North, inflicting sporadic EF2 damage to steel buildings. After crossing North Pine Hill Road, the tornado impacted Fultondale High School at EF1 intensity, significantly damaging the school's structure. Wooden poles on school grounds were snapped and a brick dugout collapsed. Trees continued to be uprooted as the tornado began to move over a forested area north of Chenoor Road; the road was clipped by the southern edge of the tornado. After tracking through the forest, it crossed over Shepherd Lane, where it struck homes at EF0 and EF1 intensity. It weakened to EF0 intensity after crossing over Hewitt Road, where it moved north of businesses. The tornado briefly strengthened to EF1 intensity over Hildegards Street, where a mobile home park was struck.

EF1 damage to an office on Sunhill Road Northwest in Center Point

The tornado knocked down trees on the campus of Jefferson State Community College, which had been struck by the tornado's northern edge. It again briefly reached EF1 intensity on Sunhill Road Northwest, located north of the Center Point Community College, where it damaged porches and collapsed garage doors inward. From 4th Street Northwest to 25th Court Northwest the tornado continued to uproot trees at EF0 intensity, before its northern edge moved over the Center Point Presbyterianism Church. The tornado damaged power lines on SR 75.

Homes were damaged on 1st Street Northeast, where the tornado maintained wind speeds from 65 to 75 miles per hour (105 to 121 km/h). To the east, it crossed Center Point Lake and continued to damage trees and homes on 4th Place Northeast through 7th Place Northeast. On County View Drive the tornado turned north, impacting Micmac Drive and Country View Court before lifting at 11:55 pm CDT.

The tornado was on the ground for 15 minutes along a 10.41-mile (16.75 km) path, reaching a maximum width of 900 yards (820 m). The tornado was the first to hit Alabama in 2021.

== Aftermath ==
=== Damage and casualties ===
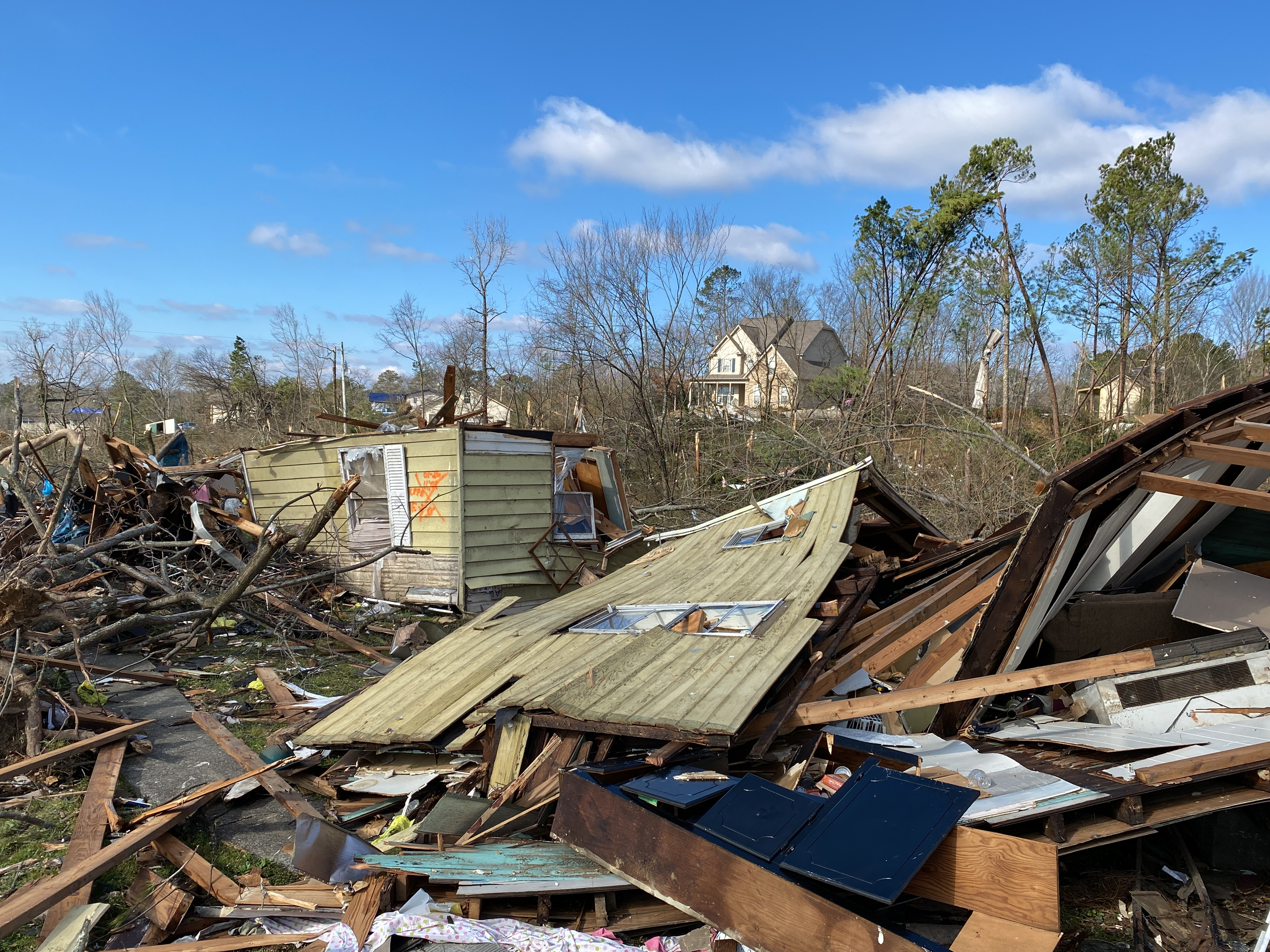
EF3 damage to a home in Fultondale

One person, a 14-year-old, was killed by the tornado when a tree fell on the home he was sheltering in; at least 30 others sustained varying injuries. 17 of the injured were transported to hospitals, and 11 were treated before being released. 265 homes were destroyed by the tornado, which received a rating of EF3 on the Enhanced Fujita scale by the National Weather Service.

=== Recovery efforts ===
The COVID-19 pandemic in Alabama, which was affecting Alabama at the time of the tornado, made the Jefferson County Emergency Management Agency change how their emergency activation centers are usually operated following the disaster.

The Hampton Inn & Suites on Fulton Road was rebuilt six months after the tornado,

Two years following the tornado, several destroyed homes remained on New Castle Road, and homes were still being rebuilt across the city.

== Other tornadoes ==
One EF0 tornado related with the storm system was confirmed on January 25.

List of confirmed tornadoes – Monday, January 25, 2021 (Note: All dates are based on the local time zone where the tornado touched down; however, all times are in Coordinated Universal Time for consistency.)
EF#	Location	County / Parish	State	Start Coord.	Time (UTC)	Path length	Max width	Summary
EF0	NNE of Piperton	Fayette	TN	35.1176°N 89.6047°W	22:29–22:31	1.26 mi (2.03 km)	50 yd (46 m)	A brief tornado touched down and moved across a few roads, before lifting a short time later. Numerous trees were downed, but no structural damage was reported.

== See also ==
- Weather of 2021
- List of North American tornadoes and tornado outbreaks
- Tornadoes in Alabama
  - 2012 Center Point–Clay tornado, an EF3 tornado that tracked through similar areas nine years earlier
