= Mario Addison =

American football player (born 1987)

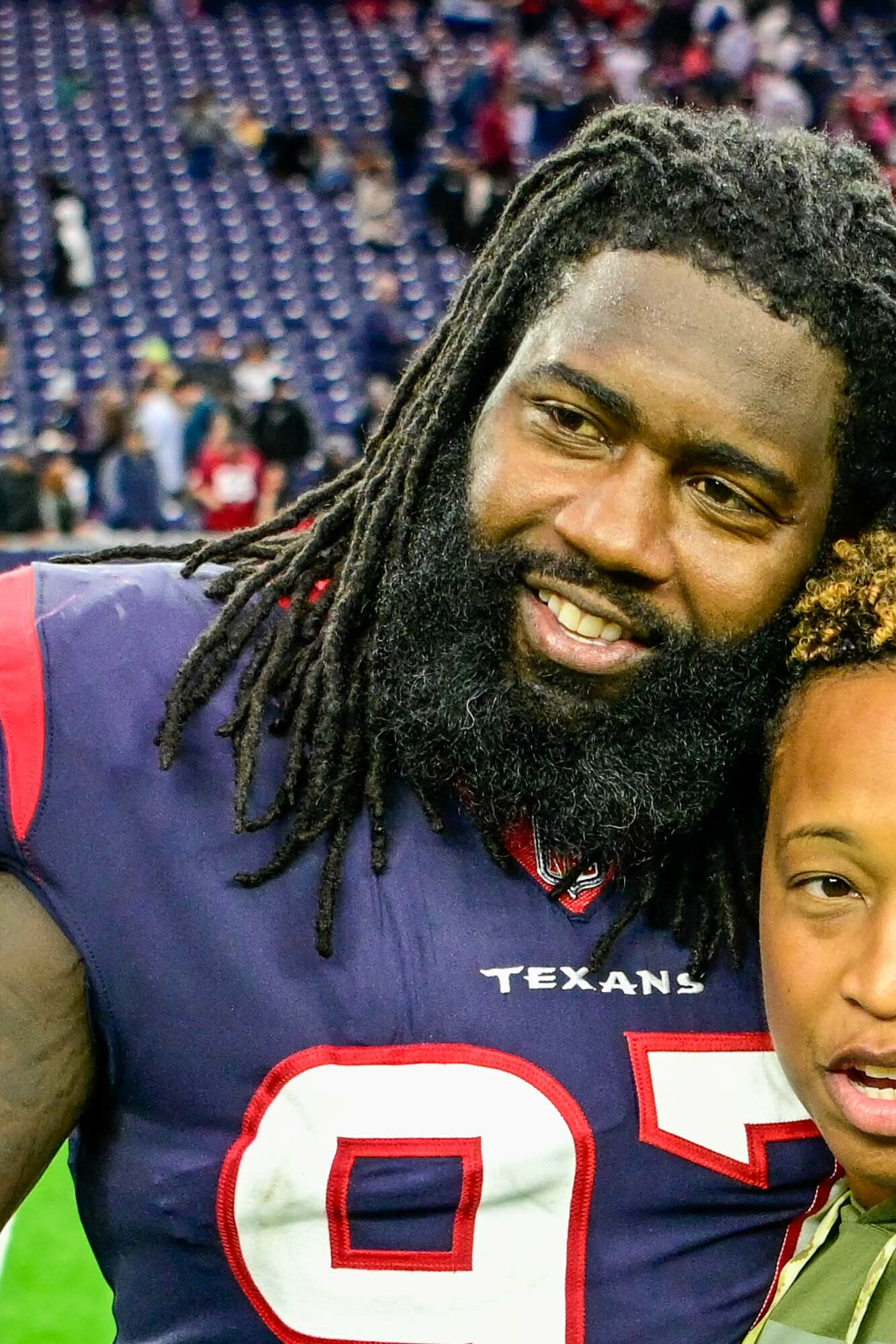
- Addison with the Houston Texans in 2022

No. 96, 97, 58
- Position: Defensive end

Personal information
- Born: September 6, 1987 (age 39); Birmingham, Alabama, U.S.
- Listed height: 6 ft 3 in (1.91 m)
- Listed weight: 260 lb (118 kg)

Career information
- High school: Tarrant (Tarrant, Alabama)
- College: Troy
- NFL draft: 2011: undrafted

Career history
- Chicago Bears (2011); Indianapolis Colts (2011–2012); Washington Redskins (2012); Carolina Panthers (2012–2019); Buffalo Bills (2020–2021); Houston Texans (2022)

Awards and highlights
- Second-team All-Sun Belt (2010)

Career NFL statistics
- Total tackles: 296
- Sacks: 68.0
- Forced fumbles: 14
- Fumble recoveries: 4
- Stats at Pro Football Reference

Mario Addison (born September 6, 1987) is an American former professional football player who was a defensive end in the National Football League (NFL). He played college football for the Troy Trojans. He was signed by the Chicago Bears as an undrafted free agent in 2011. After being cut and spending time as a reserve for the Indianapolis Colts and Washington Redskins, Addison was signed by the Carolina Panthers, playing on their defensive line for eight seasons before signing with Buffalo in 2020. He then played one year for the Houston Texans.

== Early life and college ==
Addison attended Tarrant High School just outside of Birmingham, Alabama. At Tarrant, he lettered in varsity football and basketball for four years. He originally played running back, but was moved to quarterback after the injury of the original starter. After suffering a broken hand on his throwing arm, he changed positions to defensive end. He was recruited lightly as a high school senior and chose to enroll in Northeast Mississippi Community College in Booneville, Mississippi after graduation.

After playing at Northeast Mississippi Community College for two years, Addison signed to play with Troy University. After redshirting his first year in 2008, he began seeing playing time in 2009 as a reserve player at the defensive end position. Despite being a reserve player, he saw action in all 13 games during the season and recorded 2.5 sacks and 6.0 tackles for loss.

In 2010 during his senior season, Addison broke out as a star player for Troy. He recorded 10.5 sacks, 15.5 tackles for loss, and 3 forced fumbles on the season. He was named to the All-Sun Belt Second-team following the end of the season. Addison began receiving attention from various NFL teams for his performance that year, but was never drafted.

== Professional career ==
Pre-draft measurables
Height	Weight	Arm length	Hand span	40-yard dash	10-yard split	20-yard split	20-yard shuttle	Three-cone drill	Vertical jump	Broad jump	Bench press
6 ft 2 5/8 in (1.90 m)	245 lb (111 kg)	33 1/2 in (0.85 m)	9 5/8 in (0.24 m)	4.70 s	1.63 s	2.69 s	4.28 s	6.96 s	36.0 in (0.91 m)	9 ft 7 in (2.92 m)	17 reps
All values from Pro Day

=== Chicago Bears ===
Addison was signed on July 26, 2011, by the Chicago Bears as an undrafted free agent. He was cut by the Bears on November 21, 2011, to free up space on the 53-man roster for veteran players to cover the injuries picked up by long snapper Patrick Mannelly and quarterback Jay Cutler in the previous day's 31–20 victory over the San Diego Chargers. He had only played in two games with the team.

=== Indianapolis Colts ===
Addison was claimed off waivers by Indianapolis Colts on November 22, though the Tampa Bay Buccaneers had also placed in a claim for Addison.

On October 1, 2012, Addison was waived by the Colts, but added to the practice squad the next day.

=== Washington Redskins ===
Addison was signed off the Colts' practice squad by the Washington Redskins on October 9, 2012. After playing five games with the Redskins, he was waived by the team on November 29. He was signed to the practice squad the next day.

=== Carolina Panthers ===
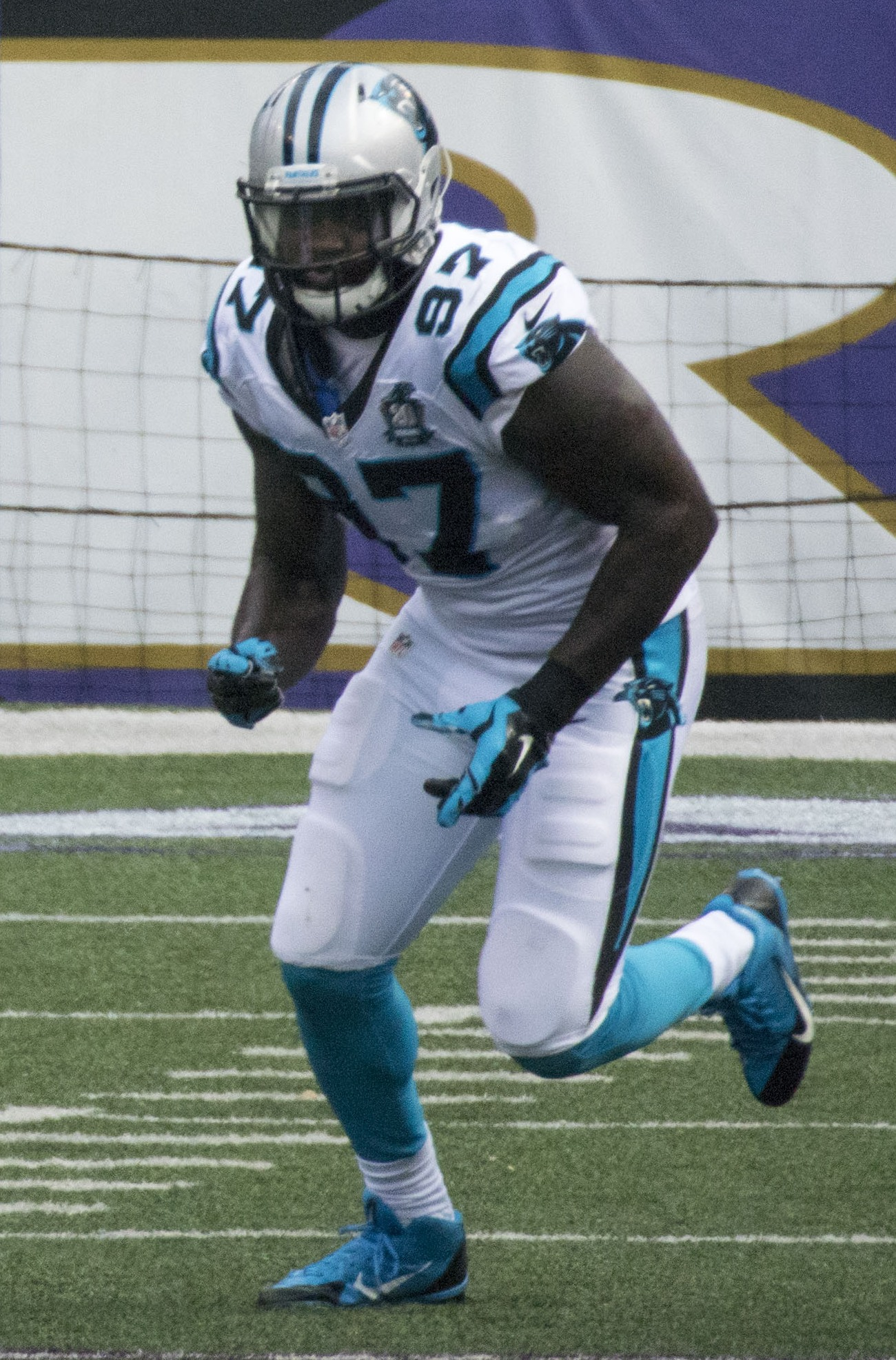
Addison with the Carolina Panthers in 2014

Addison was signed on December 4, 2012, by the Carolina Panthers from the Redskins' practice squad.

On June 18, 2014, he signed a two-year contract extension. Through the first five games of the 2014 season, Addison led the Panthers with five sacks and pass rush productivity. Addison contributed to the Panthers in 2015 with 6.0 sacks on one of the league's best defenses.

On February 7, 2016, Addison was part of the Panthers team that played in Super Bowl 50. In the game, the Panthers fell to the Denver Broncos by a score of 24–10.

On February 26, 2017, Addison signed a three-year contract extension with the Panthers after leading the team with 9.5 sacks in 2016.

In Week 3 of the 2019 season against the Arizona Cardinals, Addison sacked rookie quarterback Kyler Murray three times in the 38–20 win. Addison recorded two more sacks against the Houston Texans' Deshaun Watson the following week in a 16–10 win.

=== Buffalo Bills ===
On March 27, 2020, Addison signed a three-year contract with the Buffalo Bills. The signing reunited Addison with Buffalo Bills' head coach Sean McDermott, who previously coached him as the defensive coordinator for the Carolina Panthers.

In the Divisional Round of the playoffs against the Baltimore Ravens, Addison recorded one sack on Tyler Huntley during the 17–3 win.

=== Houston Texans ===
On May 10, 2022, Addison signed with the Houston Texans. He was placed on injured reserve on September 10, 2022. He was activated on October 8. He was released on March 16, 2023.

=== NFL statistics ===
Regular season

Year	Team	Games		Tackles					Interceptions						Fumbles	
Year	Team	GP	GS	Comb	Total	Ast	Sck	SFTY	PDef	Int	Yds	Avg	Lng	TD	FF	FR
2011	CHI	4	0	—	—	—	—	—	—	—	—	—	—	—	—	—
2011	IND	3	0	5	1	4	—	—	—	—	—	—	—	—	—	—
2012	IND	3	0	2	2	—	—	—	—	—	—	—	—	—	—	—
2012	WAS	5	0	3	1	2	—	—	—	—	—	—	—	—	—	—
2012	CAR	4	1	5	5	0	1.0	—	—	—	—	—	—	—	1	—
2013	CAR	16	2	21	13	8	2.5	—	—	—	—	—	—	—	1	1
2014	CAR	16	0	23	10	13	6.5	—	—	—	—	—	—	—	1	2
2015	CAR	14	0	23	15	8	6.0	—	—	—	—	—	—	—	—	—
2016	CAR	14	1	27	22	5	9.5	1	1	—	—	—	—	—	2	1
2017	CAR	16	16	44	27	17	11.0	—	1	—	—	—	—	—	2	—
2018	CAR	16	16	35	20	15	9.0	—	—	—	—	—	—	—	2	—
2019	CAR	15	15	34	20	14	9.5	—	—	—	—	—	—	—	2	—
2020	BUF	15	7	30	21	9	5.0	—	4	—	—	—	—	—	—	—
2021	BUF	17	0	29	20	9	7.0	—	—	—	—	—	—	—	2	—
2022	HOU	12	1	15	6	9	1.0	—	—	—	—	—	—	—	1	—
Career		170	59	296	183	113	68.0	1	6	—	—	—	—	—	14	4
Stats at NFL.com

== Personal life ==
Addison is a member of the Rho Delta Delta chapter of Omega Psi Phi fraternity at Troy University. Addison is a Christian.

His brother, Gjamal Antonio Rodriqcus, was shot and killed on October 30, 2019.
