= Matt Matthews =

Matt Matthews may refer to:

- Mat Mathews (1924–2009), Dutch accordionist
- Matt Mathews (born 1992/93), American comedian
- Matty Matthews (1873–1948), American boxer
- Rudolph "Matt" Matthews (born 1945), American handball player

== See also ==
- Matthew J. Matthews (1954–2020), American diplomat
