= Johnny Baldwin =

American football player (born 1984)

No. 57, 58
- Position: Linebacker

Personal information
- Born: April 1, 1984 (age 42); Bessemer, Alabama, U.S.
- Listed height: 6 ft 1 in (1.85 m)
- Listed weight: 230 lb (104 kg)

Career information
- High school: McAdory (AL)
- College: Alabama A&M
- NFL draft: 2007: 5th round, 158th overall pick

Career history
- Detroit Lions (2007)*; Kansas City Chiefs (2007); Washington Redskins (2008)*; Winnipeg Blue Bombers (2009)*; California Redwoods (2009)
- * Offseason or practice squad member only

Awards and highlights
- 3× All-SWAC (2004–2006)
- Stats at Pro Football Reference

Johnny Baldwin (born April 1, 1984) is an American former professional football linebacker. He was selected 158th overall by the Detroit Lions in the fifth round of the 2007 NFL draft. He played college football at Alabama A&M.

Baldwin was also a member of the Kansas City Chiefs, Washington Redskins, Winnipeg Blue Bombers, and California Redwoods.

== Early life ==
Baldwin attended McAdory High School in McCalla, Alabama and was a student and a standout in football. In football, he played linebacker and as a senior, he was an All-Area selection and an All-District selection.
