= WJSR (Alabama) =

Birmingham, Alabama; United States
- Frequency: 91.1 MHz
- Branding: 91.1 The Edge

Programming
- Format: College radio

Ownership
- Owner: Jefferson State Community College

History
- First air date: 1979
- Last air date: July 2014
- Call sign meaning: "Jeff State Radio"

Technical information
- Licensing authority: FCC
- Facility ID: 30820
- Class: A
- ERP: 230 watts
- HAAT: 59 meters (194 ft)
- Transmitter coordinates: 33°39′7.3″N 86°42′19.9″W

Links
- Public license information: Public file; LMS

WJSR (91.1 FM, "91.1 The Edge") was an American non-commercial educational College radio station licensed to serve the community of Birmingham, Alabama. The station was owned and operated by Jefferson State Community College.

== Programming ==
WJSR broadcast a college radio format to the greater Birmingham area. WJSR was a student-run station which operated five days a week, Monday through Friday, when classes were in session.

== History ==
WJSR went on the air in 1979 operating with 10 watts of effective radiated power. In 1985 the station increased to 120 watts. WJSR was broadcasting at 230 watts when it went silent.

Although WJSR was licensed to Birmingham, its signal was very difficult to receive in Birmingham itself, as the station shared the frequency with Samford University's WVSU-FM, which is the dominant station on the 91.1 frequency in most of the immediate Birmingham area. WJSR's transmitter was located on the west side of Center Point, Alabama.

WJSR ceased broadcasting in July 2014 and on July 11, 2014, license holder Jefferson State Community College informed the FCC that it had fallen silent and petitioned the FCC to cancel its broadcast license.
