= Tarrant City Schools =

School district in Alabama

Address
- 1318 Alabama Street Tarrant, Jefferson County, Alabama, 35217; United States

District information
- Type: Public
- Motto: Preparing for learning, service, and success
- Grades: K–12
- Established: 1930
- Superintendent: Dr. Shellene McDonald
- Schools: 3
- Budget: $12.1 million
- NCES District ID: 0103270

Students and staff
- Students: 1,093
- Teachers: 70
- Staff: 76
- Student–teacher ratio: 15.73

Other information
- Website: www.tarrant.k12.al.us

The Tarrant City School District is the school system of the Birmingham, Alabama, suburb of Tarrant. Tarrant City Schools serve 1,093 students and employ 146 faculty and staff. The district includes one elementary school, one middle school, and one high school.

== History ==
Tarrant's first school was built in 1920, and by 1930, its enrollment had grown to 1,443 students. The 1930 U.S. Census showed sufficient population, in compliance with the state code, for the city of Tarrant to operate its own schools independently from the Jefferson County School System. Therefore, in August 1930, Tarrant City Schools pulled away from Jefferson County and appointed a Board of Education. The new board voted to take over the existing elementary and junior high schools, leaving the high school, Jefferson County High School, under the supervision of the county. In 1948, Jefferson County High School also became part of the Tarrant City School System and its name was changed to Tarrant High School. Mr. W.A. Parker was appointed as the first superintendent of Tarrant City Schools.

== Schools ==
The district includes three schools:

- Tarrant Elementary School (K–3)
- Tarrant Intermediate School (4–6)
- Tarrant High School (7–12)

== Student Profile ==
Tarrant City Schools serve all students living within Tarrant city limits. The student population is 77% African-American, 13% Hispanic, 9% white, and 1% multiracial. Approximately 96% of students qualify for free or reduced price lunch. About 5% are English Language Learners (ELL), and about 14% have Individualized Education Programs (IEPs).

Tarrant City Schools have an overall graduation rate of 67%. Approximately 67% of Tarrant students meet or exceed state proficiency standards in mathematics, and about 75% meet or exceed standards in reading.

== Governance ==
Tarrant City Schools are governed by the Tarrant Board of Education, which consists of five members appointed by the Tarrant City Council. Each member serves the school system and community for a five-year term and may be reappointed by the City Council. The following individuals are members of the board (2015):

- Allen Bailey
- Bruce Grant
- Debbie Hall
- Gene Horton
- Jesse Mendez
