= ArDarius Stewart =

American football player (born 1993)

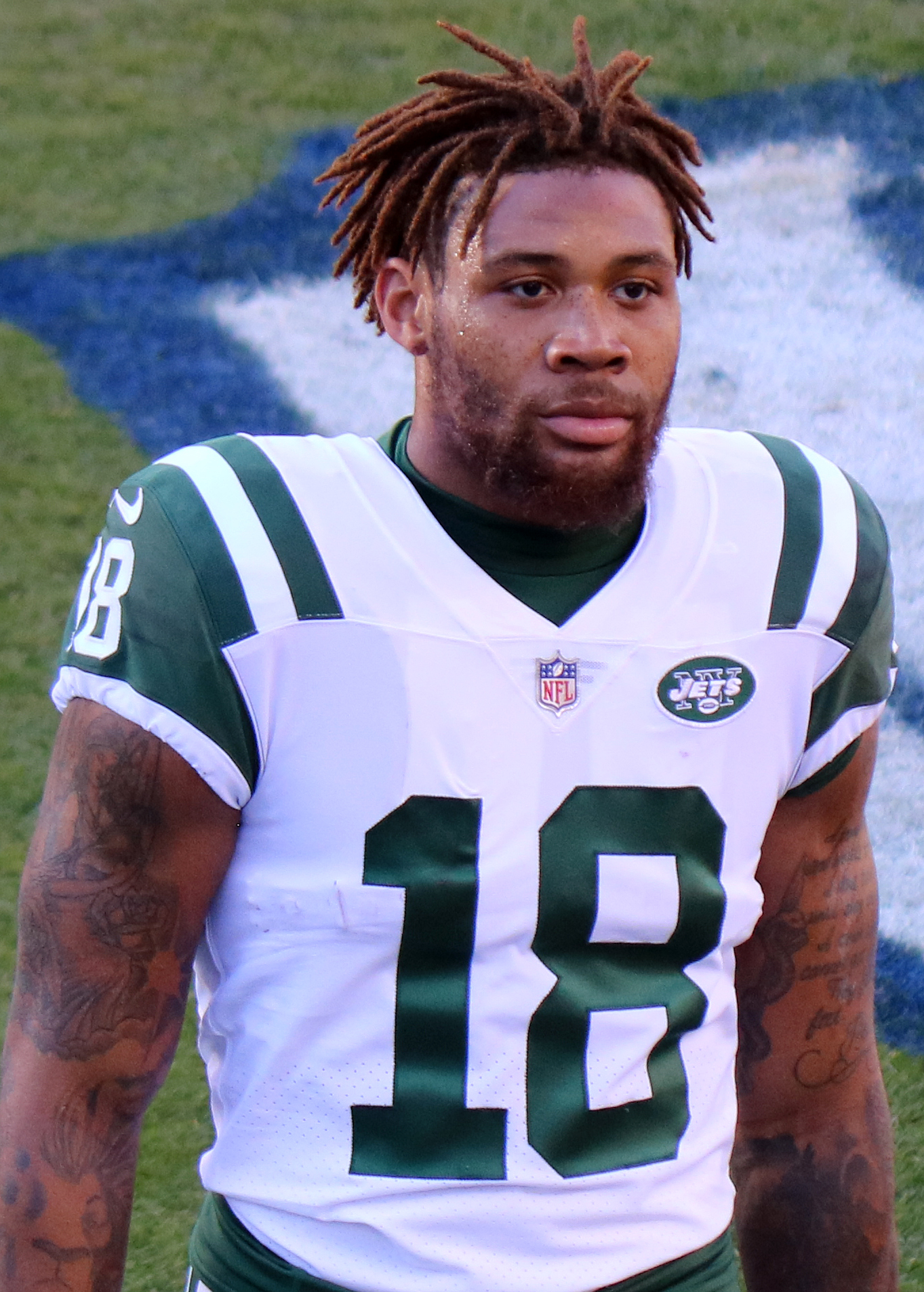
- Stewart with the New York Jets in 2017

No. 18
- Position: Wide receiver

Personal information
- Born: December 8, 1993 (age 32); Fultondale, Alabama, U.S.
- Listed height: 6 ft 0 in (1.83 m)
- Listed weight: 205 lb (93 kg)

Career information
- High school: Fultondale
- College: Alabama (2013-2016)
- NFL draft: 2017: 3rd round, 79th overall pick

Career history
- New York Jets (2017–2018); Oakland Raiders (2018)*; Washington Redskins (2018)*; Winnipeg Blue Bombers (2020); BC Lions (2022)*; DC Defenders (2023)*
- * Offseason or practice squad member only

Awards and highlights
- CFP national champion (2015); First-team All-SEC (2016)

Career NFL statistics
- Receptions: 6
- Receiving yards: 82
- Stats at Pro Football Reference

ArDarius Stewart (born December 8, 1993) is an American former professional football player who was a wide receiver in the National Football League (NFL). He played college football for the Alabama Crimson Tide, and was selected by the New York Jets in the third round of the 2017 NFL draft.

== Early life ==
Stewart attended Fultondale High School in Fultondale, Alabama, a suburb outside of Birmingham, where he played on the Wildcats football team. He played quarterback, running back, and wide receiver in high school. Stewart committed to the University of Alabama to play college football under head coach Nick Saban.

== College career ==
After redshirting his first year at Alabama in 2013, Stewart played in 13 games with two starts in 2014 and recorded 12 receptions for 149 yards. As a sophomore in 2015, he played in all 15 games, recording 63 receptions for 700 yards and four touchdowns. As a junior, he had 54 receptions for 864 yards and nine touchdowns. After the season, Stewart decided to forgo his senior year and enter the 2017 NFL draft.

== Professional career ==
Pre-draft measurables
Height	Weight	Arm length	Hand span	40-yard dash	Vertical jump	Broad jump	Wonderlic
5 ft 11 1/8 in (1.81 m)	204 lb (93 kg)	32 1/2 in (0.83 m)	9 3/8 in (0.24 m)	4.49 s	34.0 in (0.86 m)	10 ft 4 in (3.15 m)	20
All values from NFL Combine

=== New York Jets ===
Stewart was selected by the New York Jets in the third round (79th overall) of the 2017 NFL Draft. On May 25, 2017, Stewart signed a four-year deal with the Jets worth $3.25 million. On September 10, Stewart made his NFL debut. He had two receptions for 10 yards in the 21–12 loss to the Buffalo Bills. Overall, in his rookie season, Stewart finished with six receptions for 82 receiving yards in 15 games.

On July 27, 2018, Stewart was suspended for the first two games of the regular season for violating the NFL policy on performance-enhancing substances. He was waived by the Jets on September 19, and was re-signed to the practice squad. He was released on October 5.

=== Oakland Raiders ===
On November 14, 2018, Stewart was signed to the Oakland Raiders' practice squad. He was released by Oakland on November 28.

=== Washington Redskins ===
The Washington Redskins signed Stewart to their practice squad on December 26, 2018. He signed a reserve/future contract with the Redskins on December 31. The Redskins waived Stewart on January 7, 2019.

=== Winnipeg Blue Bombers ===
On February 27, 2020, Stewart signed with the Winnipeg Blue Bombers of the Canadian Football League (CFL).

=== BC Lions ===
On March 14, 2022, Stewart signed with the BC Lions of the CFL. He was released by the Lions on May 30.

=== DC Defenders ===
Stewart was assigned to the DC Defenders of the XFL on January 6, 2023. He was removed from the team's roster on January 23.
