= Minor High School =

Location
- 2285 Minor Parkway; Adamsville, Alabama 35005; United States; 33°34′35″N 86°55′38″W

Information
- Type: Public
- Motto: The Standard
- Established: 1922 (104 years ago)
- School district: Jefferson County Board of Education
- CEEB code: 010375
- Principal: Yvette Sanders
- Staff: 67.50 (FTE)
- Grades: 9-12
- Enrollment: 980 (2024-2025)
- Student to teacher ratio: 14.5
- Campus: Suburban
- Colors: Purple and white
- Athletics: AHSAA Class 6A
- Nickname: Tenacious Tigers
- Feeder schools: Minor Middle School (Formerly Bottenfield Middle School)
- Website: www.jefcoed.com/o/minorhs

Minor High School is a four-year public high school in the Birmingham, Alabama suburb of Adamsville. It is one of fourteen high schools in the Jefferson County School System. School colors are purple and white, and the athletic teams are called the Tenacious Tigers. Minor competes in AHSAA Class 6A athletics.

== History ==
Minor High School was established to serve the communities of McDonald's Chapel, Edgewater, Mulga, Bayview, Minor Heights, Docena, Crumley Chapel, Sandusky, Hillview, Westwood, Adamsville, Cardiff, Forestdale, Graysville, and Brookside. On February 13, 1922, Minor High School, named for John W. Minor, opened to 95 students. The school's principal was Mr. W. C. Petty. According to The Birmingham Post, Minor was described as the "pride and joy" of the Jefferson County Board of Education, costing $100,000 ($75,000 for the building and $25,000 for equipment).

Minor's first full year of operation began on September 11, 1922. With a faculty of seven, Minor served grades nine through twelve and had a student body of 301-members. In addition, Minor also established its athletic program, fielding a football team, a girls' basketball team, and a tennis club the same year. In June 1923, Minor graduated its first class of fourteen seniors.

Catastrophe struck at 6:30 a.m. on Friday, January 22, 1926, when a fire, originating in the chemistry laboratory, consumed the school and forced its temporary closure. Minor reopened its doors in 1927 after the main building was rebuilt. A gymnasium, extra classrooms, and a library were added later.

From its first season in 1922, Friday night football was a community event, but because of inadequate facilities, most football games were played at the opponent's field. In 1953, through the efforts of the communities served, Minor built a lighted football field and stadium. A press box was later added in 1960.

Minor experienced various expansions through the years: an office wing and classrooms in 1963, a lunchroom and band room in 1970, additional classrooms when Dixie Junior High School became available, and a new field house and gymnasium. These additions doubled the campus size.

In the late 1980s, Minor faced the task of renovation. Instead of refurbishing the school's old building, the Jefferson County Board of Education decided to retire the old school and build a new facility that would expand the school to include the 9th grade. In September 1988, classes began in the new building located in Adamsville. In 1996, a new lighted stadium was built at the Adamsville site. The 2001-2002 school year opened with a new wing consisting of seventeen new classrooms and three science labs. The necessity of a second gymnasium was soon evident. In 2002-2003, a new practice gymnasium was added to the campus. Working in conjunction with Wal-Mart and the Jefferson County Commission, Minor High School is currently building several practice athletic fields with a projected use by the soccer, softball, and football teams as well as a secondary practice location for the band.

== Student profile ==
Enrollment in grades 9-12 for the 2013-14 school year is 1,003 students. Approximately 85% of students are African-American, 13% are white, and 2% are Hispanic. Roughly 70% of students qualify for free or reduced price lunch.

Minor has a graduation rate of 83%. Approximately 83% of its students meet or exceed state proficiency standards in mathematics, and 76% meet or exceed standards in reading. The average ACT score for Minor students is 20.

== Athletics ==
Minor competes in AHSAA Class 6A athletics and fields teams in the following sports:

- Baseball
- Basketball
- Football
- Indoor Track & Field
- Outdoor Track & Field
- Soccer
- Softball
- Volleyball
- Wrestling

Minor won the state championship in boys' basketball in 1998. The football team won regional championships in 1985, 1986, 1987, 1988, 1990, 1994, 1995, 1996, 1999, 2000, and 2003. It has played in the state playoffs twenty-five times, reaching the semifinals three times and the finals once.
