= Center Point High School =

Coordinates: 33.6450°N 86.6993°W

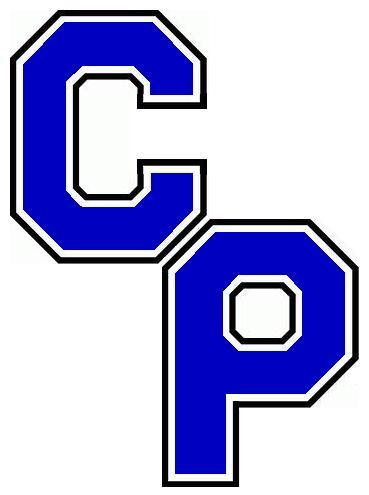

Location
- 1000 Eagle Drive; Center Point, Alabama 35215; United States

Information
- Type: Public
- Established: 2011 (15 years ago)
- School district: Jefferson County Board of Education
- CEEB code: 010348
- Principal: Van Phillips
- Teaching staff: 46.00 (FTE)
- Grades: 9-12
- Enrollment: 685 (2024–2025)
- Student to teacher ratio: 14.89
- Campus type: Suburban
- Colors: Royal blue and crimson
- Athletics: AHSAA Class 5A
- Nickname: Eagles
- Feeder schools: E.B. Erwin Middle School
- Website: www.jefcoed.com/o/centerpoinths

Center Point High School (CPHS) is a four-year public high school in the Birmingham, Alabama, United States, suburb of Center Point. It is one of fourteen high schools in the Jefferson County School System and was previously known as E.B. Erwin High School. School colors are royal blue and crimson, and the athletic teams are called the Eagles. CPHS competes in AHSAA Class 5A athletics.

== Student profile ==
Enrollment in grades 9-12 for the 2013-14 school year is 844 students. Approximately 100% of students are African-American. Roughly 90% of students qualify for free or reduced price lunch.

CPHS has a graduation rate of 62%. Approximately 72% of its students meet or exceed proficiency standards in both reading and mathematics. The average ACT score for CPHS students is 13.

== Campus ==
CPHS was constructed in 2011 at a cost of $44 million and was designed by Evan Terry Associates. The 259,000 square foot building consists of a two‑story academic and administration wing containing the administrative suites, media center, and classrooms; a one‑story activities wing consisting of the cafeteria and kitchen, band and choral space; a 650‑seat auditorium; a 400‑seat physical education gymnasium; and, a 1,500‑seat competition gymnasium and associated storage, classrooms, and locker/shower rooms. This wing has its own after-hours entrance and lobby, which allows the remainder of the school to be secured for after-hours events.

The school also includes a career/technical wing with a family and consumer sciences lab, an electronics lab and a cosmetology lab where students will be able to work toward a cosmetology license. A media center with a distance learning lab is available for students who need to take courses that are not available at CPHS.

== Athletics ==
CPHS competes in AHSAA Class 6A athletics and fields teams in the following sports:

- Boys' sports
  - Baseball
  - Basketball
  - Football
  - Golf
  - Indoor Track & Field
  - Outdoor Track & Field
  - Soccer
  - Wrestling
- Girls' sports
  - Basketball
  - Cheerleading
  - Golf
  - Indoor Track & Field
  - Outdoor Track & Field
  - Softball
  - Soccer
  - Volleyball

When it was known as E.B. Erwin High School, CPHS won the following AHSAA state championships:

- Girls' basketball (2011)
- Girls' tennis (1991)
- Wrestling (1992 and 1999)

The varsity football team won area championships in the AHSAA playoffs in 1980, 1988, 1989, 1995, 1996 and 1997.
