= 2012 Center Point–Clay tornado =

2012 intense tornado in Alabama

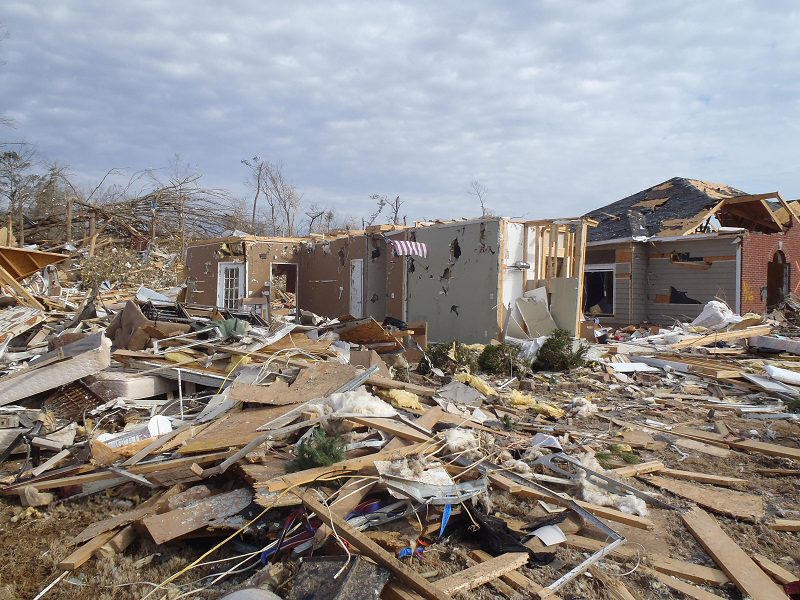
- EF3 damage to a house in Center Point, Alabama, where a fatality occurred

Meteorological history
- Formed: January 23, 2012, 3:58 a.m. CST (UTC−06:00)
- Dissipated: January 23, 2012, 4:20 a.m. CST (UTC−06:00)
- Duration: 22 minutes

EF3 tornado
- on the Enhanced Fujita scale
- Highest winds: 152 mph (245 km/h) (Note: The National Weather Service, on the same webpage publication, states the highest wind speed from the tornado was 150 mph (240 km/h), but also notes that a structure was destroyed at winds estimated at 152 mph (245 km/h).)

Overall effects
- Fatalities: 1
- Injuries: 75
- Damage: $30 million (2012 USD)
- Part of the tornado outbreaks of 2012

During the early morning hours of January 23, 2012, a large and intense tornado, commonly known as the Center Point Tornado, struck the northeastern part of the Birmingham, Alabama metropolitan area, particularly the cities of Center Point and Clay, Alabama, United States. The National Weather Service rated the most intense damage caused by the tornado EF3 on the Enhanced Fujita scale. During the tornado's 22-minute lifespan, it reached EF3 intensity three times, damaged or destroyed hundreds of structures, killed one person, and injured at least 75 others. In Center Point, the tornado damaged and destroyed buildings of the Center Point Elementary School, causing millions in damage. Residential insurance losses from Center Point and Clay were estimated at being up to $30 million.

== Meteorological synopsis ==
An upper-level low pressure system developed across the Central United States and tracked eastward. This low pressure created a cold front in Arkansas, which turned into a squall line west of Alabama. As the cold front entered Alabama, several individual supercells developed ahead of it. These supercells produced several tornadoes across Alabama, including the Center Point–Clay EF3 tornado. At 2:45 AM CST, minutes before the tornado touched down, the Storm Prediction Center issued a tornado watch across Central Alabama, which included a high risk/80% chance for tornadoes and a moderate risk/50% chance for significant, EF2-EF5 intensity tornadoes.

== Tornado summary ==
The tornado touched down 3.25 miles (5.23 km) northeast of Tarrant, first causing damage to roofs and walls in several homes and businesses. Shortly after touching down, the tornado quickly intensified EF2 intensity, as a warehouse sustained severe roof damage and some exterior wall collapse. As the tornado traveled northeast toward Center Point, several businesses sustained heavy damage or were destroyed. The tornado entered Center Point at EF2 intensity as it grew to its peak width of 880 yards (800 m). The most extreme damage in Center Point was to the Center Point Elementary School, which had portions of its roof completely ripped off. One building of the school was destroyed by the tornado. The National Centers for Environmental Information reported that the school buildings sustained $13 million (2012 USD) in structural damage and an additional $5 million (2012 USD) in damage for losses inside the buildings. The school buildings were later demolished due to the tornado's damage. Continuing northeast, the tornado damaged or destroyed numerous businesses along 24th Street and Center Point Parkway. The tornado weakened to EF1 intensity as it crossed Sweeney Valley Road, located to the east of Chalkville. Here, several homes sustained minor roof damage, with winds estimated to have been at 100 miles per hour (160 km/h).

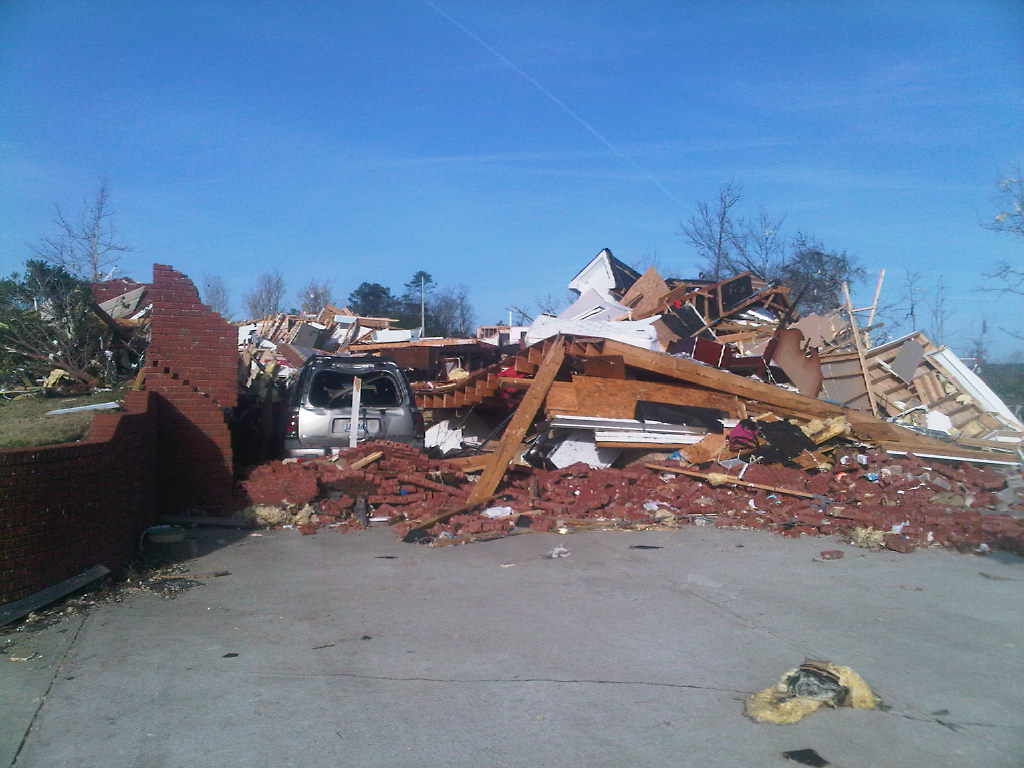
A home along Plymouth Rock Drive destroyed at mid-EF3 intensity

To the northeast of Chalkville, the tornado rapidly intensified to mid-EF3 intensity as it struck the George Brook Neighborhood. Here, dozens of homes were damaged or destroyed, with the worst damage being rated EF3 with winds estimated at 152 miles per hour (245 km/h). Entering the city of Clay, the tornado to a width of 600 yards (550 m), continuing at mid-EF3 intensity, as it crossed Old Springville Road and struck Harness Circle in the Northwoods neighborhood. Along Harness Circle, two homes were demolished at EF3 intensity and numerous other homes were damaged. In one of the destroyed homes, Christina Nicole Heichelbech, a 16-year-old girl was killed while in the process of trying to take cover. The National Weather Service rated both of the completely destroyed homes EF3 with winds estimated at 150 miles per hour (240 km/h). Continuing northeast, the tornado crossed a ridge, striking the Legacy neighborhood. Numerous homes in the neighborhood sustained moderate to minor damage. As the tornado crossed Plymouth Rock Drive, several homes were completely destroyed at EF3 intensity, with winds estimated to have been at 152 miles per hour (245 km/h). The tornado began to weaken as it crossed Interstate 59, where several homes sustained high-end EF1 damage and numerous trees were snapped and uprooted. The tornado lifted between Hidden Valley Drive and Country Living Circle, after having been on the ground for 22 minutes.

== Aftermath ==
Officially, the National Weather Service reported that the tornado killed one person, injured 75 others, and damaged or destroyed 231 structures, along a path of 15.69 miles (25.25 km). The National Oceanic and Atmospheric Administration did not list a damage total for this tornado's entire track, but the Alabama Forestry Commission estimated that the merchantable timber losses were at least $132,000 and damage to the Center Point Elementary School was at least $18 million (in 2012 USD). The Voss law firm estimated that residential insurance claims would be up to $30 million (2012 USD). A year after the tornado, the Clay City Council named January 23 as Christina Heichelbech Day to commemorate Heichelbech's life.

== Other tornadoes ==
The Center Point tornado was part of a larger outbreak of tornadoes that occurred across the Southeast. This included an EF2 tornado that killed one person near Rock Creek, Alabama.

Confirmed tornadoes by Enhanced Fujita rating
EFU	EF0	EF1	EF2	EF3	EF4	EF5	Total
0	5	10	9	1	0	0	25

=== January 22 event ===
List of reported tornadoes – Sunday, January 22, 2012
EF#	Location	County	Coord.	Time (UTC)	Path length	Comments/Damage
Arkansas
EF2	WSW of Thornton to SW of Rison	Calhoun, Cleveland, Dallas	33.77°N 92.53°W	0114	19.2 miles (30.9 km)	This tornado caused significant damage as it clipped the northwest side of Fordyce, where 11 homes and mobile homes were destroyed, 6 were severely damaged, and 5 had minor damage. The Fordyce Country Club clubhouse building was heavily damaged, and a bathhouse on the property was largely destroyed with much of the debris blown into a nearby swimming pool. Two metal truss towers were crumpled to the ground in the area as well, and several travel trailers were flipped. Near Kingsland, a church was destroyed, a mobile home had its roof torn off, and another mobile home was completely destroyed. Numerous trees were snapped and uprooted along the path.
EF1	SW of Coy	Lonoke	34.52°N 91.89°W	0128	0.75 miles (1.21 km)	An irrigation pivot was flipped and tree limbs were snapped.
EF1	Moscow	Jefferson	34.14°N 91.85°W	0206	3.8 miles (6.1 km)	A shed was thrown over a farm shop in Moscow, which suffered roof damage. An empty fuel tank was thrown into a field and an irrigation pivot was destroyed. Several trees were downed and the foundation of a house was damaged.
EF2	ESE of Sweden to N of Eldridge Corner	Jefferson, Arkansas	34.19°N 91.72°W	0215	16.9 miles (27.2 km)	Near Sweden, a large metal building was severely damaged and had a radio tower collapsed onto it. Farm machinery, grain trucks, and a gas line were damaged. Two irrigation pivots were overturned, several large grain bins were destroyed, and an old house was crushed by a falling tree. Near Eldridge Corner, two mobile homes and a farm equipment building were damaged. Many trees and power poles were downed along the path.
EF2	WNW of De Witt	Arkansas	34.32°N 91.42°W	0236	14.4 miles (23.2 km)	Four metal truss towers were toppled to the ground, and an elevator was blown off of some grain bins. A barn was badly damaged and a travel trailer was overturned. Many trees were downed along the path, and tin was removed from roofs and a tractor shed.
EF1	SW of De Witt	Arkansas	34.17°N 91.34°W	0251	9.4 miles (15.1 km)	A mobile home, a carport, and two sheds were destroyed, while a tractor shed had much of its roof torn off. A house had its windows blown out, and pieces of wood were found wedged into the siding. A metal building was destroyed, and a second metal building had one of its exterior walls pushed in. Trees and power poles were downed along the path.
EF1	S of Ragtown	Monroe, Phillips	34.48°N 91.10°W	0259	8 miles (13 km)	A farm store had several large holes ripped into the sides of the building, and a nearby large shed was thrown over the structure. Irritation pivots were overturned, trees and power poles were downed, grain bins were dented, and tin was ripped off of farm sheds.
Illinois
EF2	SSW of Enfield to ESE of Burnt Prairie	White	38.03°N 88.37°W	0418	18 miles (29 km)	A large barn was destroyed with debris scattered up to 400 yd (370 m) away. Two combines were damaged, and a concrete block garage was destroyed. A 40-foot (12-metre) communications tower was bent approximately halfway up, and a greenhouse was destroyed. Several other small barns and sheds were destroyed, and a house sustained minor damage. Many trees and power poles were snapped along the path.
EF1	SSW of Albion	Edwards	38.34°N 88.08°W	0442	6 miles (9.7 km)	Damage was mainly confined to trees, though a metal high-tension power pole was damaged.
Mississippi
EF2	E of Alligator	Bolivar	34.08°N 90.71°W	0434	3.75 miles (6.04 km)	Eight mobile homes were severely damaged, four of which were destroyed. Several other homes were heavily damaged, grain bins were blown away, and a 200-foot tall radio tower was blown over and mangled. Two metal frame buildings were destroyed, and many trees and power poles were snapped.
EF0	WNW of Marks	Quitman	34.25°N 90.27°W	0500	0.25 miles (0.40 km)	Seven homes sustained minor damage, with shingles and roofing material blown off and windows broken. One home had its garage door blown in.
Kentucky
EF1	Hazel	Calloway	36.50°N 88.26°W	0503	5.6 miles (9.0 km)	Homes sustained damage to their shingles, windows, and shutters. A business in town had its porch roof destroyed. Two garages were leveled, and a third had a section of roof ripped off. Three barns were destroyed, and hundreds of trees were downed, one of which landed on a truck.
EF0	SW of Clifty	Todd	36.99°N 87.18°W	0555	2.5 miles (4.0 km)	Several trees were knocked down and some homes sustained shingle damage. A garage had its roof blown off, and a barn and several greenhouses were damaged. A camper trailer was overturned and destroyed, and a pool was damaged, along with a grain bin.
Tennessee
EF1	S of Lexington	Henderson	35.58°N 88.39°W	0558	8 miles (13 km)	Numerous trees were uprooted and snapped. A house lost part of its roof and a shed was destroyed.
Sources: SPC Storm Reports for 01/22/12, NWS Little Rock, NWS Jackson, MS, NWS Paducah, KY, NWS Memphis, TN

=== January 23 event ===
List of reported tornadoes – Monday, January 23, 2012
EF#	Location	County	Coord.	Time (UTC)	Path length	Comments/Damage
Alabama
EF0	SE of Panola	Sumter	32.9287°N 88.2364°W	0836	0.36 miles (0.58 km)	One home suffered roof damage and another suffered minor siding damage.
EF2	Koffman	Tuscaloosa	33.33°N 87.65°W	0842	0.45 miles (720 m)	Brief but strong tornado struck the rural community of Koffman. A house had its roof ripped off, a barn and an outbuilding were destroyed, and many trees were snapped.
EF2	E of Windham Springs	Tuscaloosa	33.40°N 87.40°W	0900	0.56 miles (900 m)	Three wooden H-frame transmission poles were snapped, along with multiple trees. A hunting camp was severely impacted with eight camper trailers rolled, three of which were destroyed.
EF2	NW of Rock Creek	Tuscaloosa, Jefferson	33.43°N 87.31°W	0909	13 miles (21 km)	1 death – 50 homes and mobile homes were damaged or destroyed in the Toadvine area as a result of this high-end EF2 tornado. Numerous trees were snapped and uprooted along the path. The fatality occurred when a manufactured home was completely destroyed.
EF0	NE of Livingston	Sumter	32.66°N 88.17°W	0921	1.1 miles (1.8 km)	Numerous trees and a shed were damaged.
EF3	NE of Tarrant to NE of Argo	Jefferson, St. Clair	33.70°N 86.80°W	0958	15.5 miles (24.9 km)	1 death – See section above on this tornado – 75 people were injured.
EF1	N of Marion	Perry	32.71°N 87.31°W	1033	2.1 miles (3.4 km)	Many trees were uprooted and snapped.
EF2	NE of Marion to N of Clanton	Perry, Chilton	32.72°N 87.27°W	1037	39.5 miles (63.6 km)	This strong, long-track tornado first caused major structural damage to a church and snapped or uprooted thousands of trees in the Talladega National Forest. The tornado then struck the town of Maplesville, causing significant damage. 36 homes in Maplesville were heavily damaged or destroyed, and 40 others sustained minor damage. Several businesses sustained damage as well. Continuing to the northeast, the tornado destroyed a business, collapsed a radio tower, damaged ten manufactured homes, and destroyed five other manufactured homes. Numerous trees were downed towards the end of the path before the tornado dissipated, some of which landed on homes.
EF0	ENE of Childersburg	Talladega	33.30°N 86.30°W	1135	5.4 miles (8.7 km)	A number of trees were uprooted and snapped.
EF1	S of Clanton	Chilton	32.73°N 86.63°W	1236	3.67 miles (5.91 km)	Several manufactured homes sustained minor damage, and one was destroyed. Ten other frame homes were damaged as well, one of which was completely shifted off of its foundation. Another home was shifted to a lesser degree, while a third had most of its roof blown off. Several outbuildings were destroyed, and many trees were downed along the path.
EF1	N of Millbrook	Elmore	32.52°N 86.41°W	1348	4.02 miles (6.47 km)	60 homes sustained minor roof and siding damage, an auto shop sustained damage to its garage doors, and an apartment building had its metal roof removed. Multiple trees were downed as well.
Sources: NWS Birmingham

== See also ==
- Weather of 2012
- 2021 Fultondale tornado, an EF3 tornado that struck similar areas nine years later
