= Jefferson County International Baccalaureate School =

Coordinates: 33°32′32″N 86°40′02″W

Location
- 1450 Carson Road North; Fultondale, Alabama 35217; United States

Information
- Type: Public/magnet
- Motto: Secan, Scearu, Findan (Old English meaning "To seek, to discern, to find")
- Established: 1973 (53 years ago)
- School board: Jefferson County School System
- CEEB code: 010369
- Principal: Lori Lightsey
- Faculty: 22
- Grades: 9–12
- Enrollment: 372
- Student to teacher ratio: 17:1
- Campus type: Suburban
- Mascot: The Tree of Knowledge
- Publication: Counterpane
- Feeder schools: Jefferson County IB Middle School
- Website: www.jefcoed.com/JCIBIC

Jefferson County International Baccalaureate School (JCIB) is a public International Baccalaureate school located in Fultondale, Alabama. The school enrolls 372 students in grades 9-12 and is a part of the Jefferson County School System.

It is consistently recognized as one of the best high schools in the country:

- JCIB was ranked first in Alabama and 9th in the U.S. in the 2016 Washington Post study of America's Most Challenging High Schools.
- The Daily Beast ranked JCIB first in Alabama and 13th in the U.S. in its 2014 Top High Schools ranking.
- In 2005, 2006, 2007, and 2009 JCIB was ranked #1, #2, #4, and #3 respectively in the annual Newsweek poll of "The 100 Best High Schools in America".

== Student profile ==
JCIB students are diverse: 54.25% are white, 40.8% are African-American, 0.61% are Asian-American, 13.5% are Hispanic, and 5.21% are multiracial. 38.34% of students qualified for free or reduced price lunch.

100% of JCIB students graduate and go on to attend four-year colleges and universities. The 2016 graduating class earned approximately $12 million in college scholarships, an average of almost $160,000 per student.

JCIB students have an average ACT score of 29, and the average SAT score is 1,831. The most recent graduating class includes three National Merit & Achievement Finalists, 64 AP Scholars, 35 AP Scholars with Honor, 21 AP Scholars with Distinction, and two AP National Scholars.

== Admission ==
Students must apply to JCIB during the late winter prior to the year of anticipated enrollment. The application requires students to submit a transcript and test scores from their current schools, recommendations from both a mathematics and language arts instructor, and an application essay. Students are also strongly encouraged to attend an open house and/or shadow a student prior to applying. Students must also pay tuition if they live outside Jefferson County. The tuition for students from other counties is $2200 per year.

== Curriculum ==
=== AP & IB courses ===
All academic courses at JCIB are taught at an accelerated pace. Many courses prepare students for Advanced Placement or International Baccalaureate Exams. While all students are required to take a rigorous curriculum that includes both AP and IB coursework, students may choose whether to work toward earning an IB diploma. Approximately 64% of the 2015 graduating class received an IB diploma.

== Campus ==
Previously, the high school was located on the campus of Shades Valley High School. The school's independent campus officially opened to the public on February 27, 2026. Students began attending the campus on March 2nd, 2026.

== Notable alumni ==
- Daniel Scheinert, of directing duo Daniels (directors), class of 2004.
