= Pleasant Grove High School (Alabama) =

Location
- 100 Spartan Drive; Pleasant Grove, Alabama 35127; United States; 33°29′51″N 86°59′50″W

Information
- Type: Public
- Established: 1970 (56 years ago)
- School district: Jefferson County Board of Education
- CEEB code: 012207
- Principal: Jarvis Watkins
- Teaching staff: 47.80 (FTE)
- Grades: 7-12
- Enrollment: 752 (2024–2025)
- Student to teacher ratio: 15.73
- Campus type: Suburban
- Colors: Purple and gold
- Athletics: AHSAA Class 4A
- Nickname: Spartans
- Feeder schools: Pleasant Grove Elementary School
- Website: www.jefcoed.com/o/pleasantgrovehs

Pleasant Grove High School (PGHS) is a combined middle school and high school in the Birmingham, Alabama suburb of Pleasant Grove. It is one of fourteen high schools in the Jefferson County School System. School colors are purple and gold, and the athletic teams are called the Spartans. PGHS competes in AHSAA Class 4A athletics.

== Student profile ==
Enrollment in grades 9-12 for the 2013-14 school year is 548 students. Approximately 74% of students are African-American, 25% are white, and 1% are Hispanic. Roughly 46% of students qualify for free or reduced price lunch.

PGHS has a graduation rate of 95%. Approximately 92% of its students meet or exceed state proficiency standards in both mathematics and reading. The average ACT score for PGHS students is 22.

== Campus ==
- The current PGHS campus was constructed in 2010 at a cost of $44.2 million. It is located on Spartan Drive. It is a 260,000 square foot facility with 32 classrooms, three computer labs, two gyms, a 650-seat auditorium, and a 100-seat lecture hall. The new campus includes athletic facilities constructed shortly after the school was opened. It includes a football stadium with a sod field and separate home and visitor bleachers, a fieldhouse with weight room, meeting rooms, dressing facilities, coaches' offices and concessions. There is a rubberized track for trach and field events as well as a tower for the school's marching band.
- The first Pleasant Grove High School was built shortly after the City attempted to establish a municipal school system which it was ultimately denied by the Federal Courts. That aging facility that had been in use for over 40 years and still exists. It is located at the corner of 7th Street and 9th Avenue. That facility did not have an auditorium or football stadium on site.

== Athletics ==
PGHS competes in AHSAA Class 4A athletics and fields teams in the following sports:

- Baseball
- Basketball (boys and girls)
- Cheerleading
- Football
- Golf (boys and girls)
- Indoor Track & Field (boys and girls)
- Outdoor Track & Field (boys and girls)
- Soccer (boys and girls)
- Softball
- Tennis (boys and girls)
- Volleyball

PGHS won the AHSAA state championship in baseball in 1993, 1994, and 1996. Its football team won regional championships in 1984, 1988, 2006, and 2010. They also advanced to the 2014 5A state championship game before losing to St. Paul's.

On the football field, Pleasant Grove's two most common rivals have been Fairfield High School whom they have played 33 times with a record of 19-14 and Mortimer Jordan High School (29 times) with a record of 13-16.

== Notable alumni ==
- James Bradberry, Cornerback in the NFL.
- Anthony Blevins, NFL assistant coach
- Anez Cooper, NFL offensive lineman for the New York Jets
- Jake Elmore, MLB infielder.
