= Jefferson County Schools (Alabama) =

School district in Alabama

Jefferson County School District

Location
- Birmingham, Alabama Alabama United States
- Coordinates: 33°29′15.42″N 86°47′38.59″W

District information
- Type: Public
- Motto: The mission of the Jefferson County School System is to ensure rigorous learning for all through engaging, innovative instruction, responsible resource management, and meaningful community and family collaboration focused on student success.
- Grades: PreK–12
- Established: 1896
- Superintendent: Dr. Walter Gonsoulin
- Schools: 56
- Budget: $394.8 million
- NCES District ID: 0101920

Students and staff
- Students: 36,000
- Teachers: 2,500
- Staff: 2,000

Other information
- Website: jefcoed.com

The Jefferson County School System is the second-largest public school system in Alabama, United States. It is the third oldest school system in Jefferson County preceded only by the Birmingham and Bessemer School Systems. The Jefferson County School System was created in 1896, and initially served all unincorporated communities and cities in the county other than Birmingham and Bessemer. Beginning in the late 1960s and early 1970s various other cities began to establish their own separate systems (i.e., Homewood, Midfield, Vestavia Hills, Hoover, etc.). Today the County system serves students in those unincorporated areas of Jefferson County, Alabama such as Alliance, Bagley, Concord, Corner, Forestdale, McCalla, Minor, Mt. Olive, and Oak Grove. It also includes students who reside in the cities of Adamsville, Clay, Fultondale, Gardendale, Graysville, Hueytown, Irondale, Kimberly, Morris, Pinson, Pleasant Grove, and Warrior among others. Those cities listed below each have a city-based school system, therefore, their students do not attend schools in the Jefferson County School System:

- Bessemer (Bessemer Public Schools) (established in 1887)
- Birmingham (Birmingham City Schools) (established in 1874)
- Fairfield (Fairfield City Schools) (established 1923)
- Homewood (Homewood Public Schools) (established 1970)
- Hoover (Hoover City Schools) (established 1987)
- Leeds (Leeds City Schools) (established 2003)
- Midfield (Midfield City Schools) (established 1970)
- Mountain Brook (Mountain Brook School System) (established 1959)
- Tarrant (Tarrant City Schools) (established 1930)
- Trussville (Trussville City Schools) (established 2005)
- Vestavia Hills (Vestavia Hills School System) (established 1970)

== Current Board Members, Responsibilities, and Election ==
The system is presided over by the elected Jefferson County Board of Education which is responsible for setting school policy, adoption of an annual operating budget, and broad issues usually dealt with by most school boards, such as construction of new schools, etc. The Board also relies on the guidance of the Superintendent in the making of many of those decisions. the work of the Board is financed by appropriations from the Alabama Legislature and a series of property taxes some of which are "district wide" and some of which are "county wide" in nature, plus the proceeds of a 1 cent sales tax.

The Board consists of five members elected by Place Number in partisan elections for six year terms. While these races are usually decided in the respective party primaries almost none of the work or decisions of the Board are of a partisan nature. There is no limitation on the number of terms to which a member can be elected. Four of the five members (Places 1-4) are elected only by the voters of the areas actually served by the school board. The fifth member (Place 5) is elected collectively only by the voters of the 11 cities that have their own school systems. This configuration is mandated by State law. When vacancies occur during a term the remaining members of the Board have the power to appoint someone to the post for the remainder of the unexpired term.

The current Board members, their party affiliation, and the designated Place Number when they appear on the ballot are as follows:

Name	Party affiliation	First elected	Next Election	Ballot Position
Donna J. Pike	Republican	2016	2022	Place 1
Eddie Brown	Republican	2018	2024	Place 2
Oscar S. Mann	Republican	2012	2024	Place 3
Ronnie Dixon	Republican	(1)	2020	Place 4
Carita Venable	Democrat	(2)	2022	Place 5

(1) Dixon was appointed to the Board in May, 2016. (2) Venable was appointed to the Board in February, 2019.

== History ==
During the COVID-19 pandemic in Alabama, the school district required face masks for all of the 2020-2021 school year.

== Past Board Members (Partial List) ==
Many different men and women have served on the Board over the years. For most of the Board's history all its members were Democrats until the election of Republican Jim Hicks in 1980. After Mr. Hicks election the Board transitioned to a Republican majority over the next few election cycles. It has remained with a Republican majority ever since. Three African-Americans have served on the Board including the present Board member, Carita Venable. Previously, Martha Bouyer, and Jacqueline Smith served with Mrs. Smith being the first African-American to be elected as Board President. Below is a partial listing of past members:

- William A. Berry (D)
- Carl R. Bottenfield (D)
- Martha V. J. Bouyer (D) (2014-2018)
- Roy F. Bragg (D)
- Jack E. Brymer (D)
- Mary M. Buckelew (R)
- Chester Cowan, Jr. (D)
- Jack M. Dabbs (D)
- Robert L. "Bob" Ellis, Jr.(D)
- Betsy Faucette (D)
- Randall Goodwin (D) (1978-1984)
- Belva Green (R)
- Owen G. Gresham (D)
- Robert Gwin (D)
- Mrs. Robert (Harriette) Gwin (D)
- Jim R. Hicks (R) (1980-1992)
- W. A. Jenkins, Jr. (D)
- L. E. Kirby (D)
- Joseph E. Lacey (D)
- Tommy Little
- Bill Mewbourne (D) (1984-1986)
- Karen Smith Nix (R) (retired 2012)
- Jennifer Hatcher Parsons (R) (1998-2016)
- W. I. Pittman (D)
- Ronald Rhodes (R) (2000-2013)
- George M. Rogers (D)
- George Rudd (D)
- Jacqueline A. Smith (D) (1986-2018)
- Jeffrey Dean Taylor, Jr. (R) (2014-2016)
- Kevin Walsh (R)

== Superintendents ==
Day-to-day operations of the system are run by the superintendent. That post is filled by appointment by a majority vote of the County Board of Education and that individual serves at the pleasure of the Board. The most recent superintendent was Dr. Craig Pouncey, who took over in June 2014, following the ouster of Dr. Stephen Nowlin after 16 months in office. On September 11, 2019, it was announced that Dr. Pouncey had accepted the Presidency of Coastal Alabama Community College, effective October 1, 2019 and would leave his post with Jefferson County on September 27. Dr. Walter Gonsoulin, Jr., the Deputy Superintendent became Interim Superintendent on September 27, 2019 and was given the position permanently by the Board in November, 2019, becoming the first African-American to be permanent Superintendent.

The first Superintendent of Jefferson County was Isaac Wellington McAdory from 1896–1913. In 1868, shortly after The Civil War and long before the County System existed, he and his wife, Alice (Sadler) McAdory, established and ran the Pleasant Hill Academy in McCalla. It was arguably the first education institution in Jefferson County preceding both the Birmingham and Bessemer systems and even predating any colleges or universities in the county. The Pleasant Hill Academy is the forerunner of present-day McAdory High School. The first seven superintendents of the system all had schools named in their honor. However, McNeil School no longer exists and Simmons Elementary is now part of the Hoover School System. Issac Wellington McAdory is the only Superintendent who has three separate schools named in his honor which may be more of a coincidence than a deliberate effort.

Superintendents	Years of service
Isaac W. McAdory	1889-1913
P. M. McNeil	1913-1917
N. R. Baker	1917-1925
Eugene B. Erwin	1925-1936
John E. Bryan	1937-1948
Ira F. Simmons	1948-1959
Kermit A. Johnson	1959-1968
J. Revis Hall	1968-1981
John J. Hunt	1981-1984
William E. Burkett	1984-1989
Herb A. Sang	1989-1991
Bruce Wright	1992-2000
Bobby Neighbors	2000-2003
Roger Tomberlin (interim)	2003
Phil Hammonds	2004-2013
Stephen Nowlin	2013-2014
Bobby Neighbors (interim)	2014
W. Craig Pouncey	2014-2019
Walter Gonsoulin, Jr.	2019–present

== List of current schools ==
=== High schools ===
The Jefferson County School District includes the following fourteen high schools. Data on enrollment, student-teacher ratio, and graduation rate are all drawn from the 2013–14 academic year.

School	Location	Enrollment (9–12)	Student-Teacher Ratio	Graduation Rate	Avg. ACT Score	Athletics
Center Point High School	Center Point	764	15:1	86%	18	5A
Clay-Chalkville High School	Clay	1,388	18:1	86%	21	6A
Corner High School	Corner	519	16:1	95%	24	5A
Fultondale High School (2)	Fultondale	443	11:1	73%	24	4A
Gardendale High School	Gardendale	1,063	19:1	90%	24	6A
Hueytown High School	Hueytown	1,171	18:1	88%	22	6A
Jefferson County IB School	Irondale	334	17:1	100%	30	---
McAdory High School	McCalla	1,240	19:1	92%	21	6A
Minor High School	Adamsville	1,011	15:1	83%	20	6A
Mortimer Jordan High School	Kimberly	855	17:1	95%	24	6A
Oak Grove High School (1)	Bessemer	439	13:1	84%	24	4A
Pinson Valley High School	Pinson	1,021	20:1	83%	22	6A
Pleasant Grove High School (2)	Pleasant Grove	507	15:1	95%	22	4A
Shades Valley High School	Irondale	1,122	16:1	93%	22	6A

(1) Oak Grove is a combined Middle and High School campus containing grades 6–12.

(2) Both Pleasant Grove and Fultondale are combined Middle and High School campus containing grades 7–12.

=== Middle schools ===
- Bagley Junior High School
- Erwin Middle School
- Minor Middle School (formerly C. R. Bottenfield Junior High School)
- Bragg Middle School
- Brighton Middle School
- Clay-Chalkville Middle School
- Hueytown Middle School (formerly W. I. Pittman Junior High School)
- Irondale Middle School
- North Jefferson Middle School
- Rudd Middle School
- McAdory Middle School

=== Elementary schools ===
- Adamsville Elementary School
- Brookville Elementary School
- Bryan Elementary School
- Center Point Elementary School
- Chalkville Elementary School
- Clay Elementary School
- Concord Elementary School
- Crumly Chapel Elementary School
- Erwin Elementary School
- Fultondale Elementary School
- Gardendale Elementary School
- Greenwood Elementary School (was Greenwood Junior High School 1959-1966)
- Gresham Elementary School
- Hillview Elementary School
- Hueytown Elementary School
- Johnson Elementary School
- Lipscomb Elementary School
- McAdory Elementary School
- Mount Olive Elementary School
- North Highland Elementary School
- Oak Grove Elementary School (K-5)
- Pinson Elementary School
- Pleasant Grove Elementary School
- Snow Rogers Elementary School
- Warrior Elementary School
- West Jefferson Elementary School

=== Community schools ===
- Corner Schools
- Grantswood Community School
- Irondale Community School
- Minor Community School

== Former schools (Partial List) ==
With the passage of years many former schools in the Jefferson County School System completely ceased to exist. This is to be expected in a system that is over 100 years old. Most were established by the County Board of Education, yet some were first established by a local community or were built as "company schools" and ceded to the County System at a later date. Other schools have seen their names changed or been sold or ceded to some of the other municipal systems. This occurs for a variety of reasons some of which are demographic changes, de-segregation orders, obsolete facilities, etc. Many of these campuses are gone without a trace and a few have been re-purposed to other uses. This list does not include former school buildings at different sites for institutions that still exist under the same name such as Shades Valley High School (2 different campuses); Hueytown High School (3 different campuses); Minor High School (2 campuses), etc. The list does include schools whose names and/or locations have changed such as Berry High School (now Hoover High School) or New Castle High School (now Fultondale High School).

=== High Schools (Partial List) ===
Name of High School	Location	Years	Additional Notes
Alliance High School	Alliance community	(1920-1930)	
W. A. Berry High School	near City of Hoover, Old Columbiana Road	(1959-1988)	converted to Berry Middle School (Hoover System), sold to Vestavia Board of Education (2016)
Brighton High School	City of Brighton	(1941-1989)	closed and abandoned
E.B. Erwin High School	Center Point	(1964-2010)	replaced by Center Point High School; was a Middle School from 1957-1964 and again from 2011-present
Gilmore-Bell Vocational High School	present day City of Hueytown		Demolished, vacant and overgrown property at 4933 Bessemer-Johns Road
Hooper City High School	present day City of Birmingham	(1947-1965)	all black school
Jones Valley High School	City of Birmingham	(1921-1988)	closed, Demolished, site now is Jones Valley Middle School (Birmingham System)
New Castle High School	City of Fultondale	(1965-1972)	renamed Fultondale High School after 1972
Robert R. Moton High School	City of Leeds	(1948-1970)	all black school; closed when system was desegregated; Moton Community Ctr. since 2012
Powderly High School	present day City of Birmingham	(1940-1946)	all black school
Rosedale High School	present day City of Homewood	closed in 1969	all black school, closed when system was desegregated
Shades Cahaba High School	present day City of Homewood	(1921-1948)	building still exists as Shades Cahaba Elementary School (Homewood System)
Warrior High School	City of Warrior	(1926-2002)	closed, building still exists
West Jefferson High School	City of West Jefferson	(1923-2000)	building still exists, serves as West Jefferson City Hall and community center
Westfield High School	present day City of Birmingham (Tin Mill Road)	(1933-1971)	all black school; closed when system desegregated; Demolished 1973; Judge U.W. Clemon is a graduate

=== Other Schools (Partial List) ===
Name	Location	Years	Additional Notes
Addison Elementary School	Bessemer (Morgan Rd & Hwy 150)	(1914-1980s)	all black school, building abandoned but still exists
Alley School	Birmingham (Elyton community)	(1902-1964)	ceded to Birmingham after the 1910 municipal consolidation
Alliance Elementary	Alliance community		abandoned building still exists
Dixie Junior High School	Minor community	closed in 1970	replaced by Bottenfield Jr. High (1971) and renamed Minor Middle School (2016)
Dolomite Elementary	site in present-day City of Hueytown (Dolomite neighborhood)		Demolished (vacant lot on Pleasant Grove Road)
Graysville Junior High School	City of Graysville	closed in 1980s	building now owned by City of Graysville
Greenwood School	Greenwood community (within City of Bessemer)(5012 Roselyn Rd)	(1937-1966)	ceded to Bessemer School System in 1966, still operates in Bessemer System, served grades 1-9 through 1959
Greenwood Junior High School	Greenwood community (1217 School Rd)	(1959-1966)	since 1966 the building has been Greenwood Elementary of the Jefferson County system
Hall-Kent Elementary	present day City of Homewood (west Homewood)	(1927-1970)	ceded to Homewood School System in 1970
Ishkooda Elementary			
Johns Elementary	near City of North Johns		
Ketona Elementary			
Ketona Junior High School	near Tarrant City		
Majestic Elementary	City of Morris		
McDonald Chapel Elementary			
McNeil School	site in present-day City of Bessemer	(1923-1989)	(grades 1-8), Demolished in 1998, site today is McNeil Park
Mineral Springs Elementary	Mt. Olive		
Mulga Elementary			
Pinson School (Old Rock School)	4509 Pinson Blvd, Pinson	(1921-1980s)	building still exists, now is Pinson Public Library as of Jan., 2019)
Raimund Elementary	present day City of Bessemer		
Red Ore Elementary	Bessemer	(1917-1970s)	(all black school) originally built by Woodward Coal Company
Roosevelt Elementary	formerly A.G. Gaston Elementary School; now in City of Birmingham		all black school
Joseph N. Rutledge Elementary	present day City of Midfield		ceded to Midfield School System after 1970
Sandusky Elementary		closed mid 1980s	today is Sandusky Community Center
Shannon Elementary	present day City of Homewood (Shannon neighborhood)		closed in 1970s
Sylvan Springs Elementary	City of Sylvan Springs		building today serves as a Community Center located on Rock Creek Road
Trafford Elementary			
Virginia Mines School	site in present-day City of Hueytown	closed 1950s	(grades 1-6) Demolished (site is now part of a housing subdivision)
Booker T. Washington Elementary	present day City of Birmingham (Titusville)	(1904-2007)	(all black school) ceded to Birmingham after 1910 municipal consolidation, Demolished 2007
Wenonah School	Brownsville community	1917-2007	(all black school)(grades 1-9); built as a "company owned" school, later ceded to Jefferson County, transferred to B'ham system (1974)
Wilkes School	present day City of Midfield		(grades 1-8), ceded to Midfield School System after 1970, building still exists
Woodward Jr. High School	present day City of Birmingham (now St. John Baptist Church)	1956-1986	(grades 1-8) replaced Dolomite Colored Elementary School, two blocks away from all-white Dolomite Elementary School
Rosa Zinnerman Elementary	City of Hueytown		closed, abandoned but still exists

== Failing schools ==
Statewide testing ranks the schools in Alabama. Those in the bottom six percent are listed as "failing." As of early 2018, both Center Point and Minor High Schools were included in this category.
