= Midfield City Schools =

School district in Alabama

Location
- Midfield, Alabama United States

District information
- Type: Public
- Grades: K–12
- Established: 1970
- Superintendent: Dr. Shun Williams
- Schools: 3
- Budget: $11.9 million
- NCES District ID: 0102350

Students and staff
- Students: 1,159
- Teachers: 72
- Staff: 74

Other information
- Website: http://www.midfield.k12.al.us/

The Midfield City School District is the school system of the Birmingham, Alabama, suburb of Midfield. Midfield City Schools serve 1,159 students and employ 146 faculty and staff. The district includes one elementary school, one middle school, and one high school.

== History ==
Midfield schools were part of the Jefferson County School System until 1970, when the citizens of Midfield voted to organize their own school system. They voted to pay an additional 7 1/2 mil ad valorem tax in order to support the new district.

Thomas M. Alexander was appointed the first superintendent on February 1, 1971. The first school board office was in a house behind the Midfield Public Library, which was the Midfield City Hall at the time. Jefferson County operated the schools for the remainder of the 1970-71school year, and on July 1, 1971, the county turned over the operation of three schools to Midfield. These schools were Midfield Elementary, created in 1954; Wilkes Junior High School, which was annexed into Midfield in 1962; and Rutledge School, which by this time was surrounded by the city limits of Midfield. Midfield High School was then constructed in 1972.

Wilkes Junior High School was eventually closed, leaving the three schools that are in operation today.

== Schools ==
The Midfield City School District includes three schools:

- Midfield Elementary School
- Rutledge Middle School
- Midfield High School

== Student Profile ==
Midfield City Schools serve all students living within Midfield city limits. The student population is 97% African-American, 1% white, 1% Hispanic, and 1% multiracial. Approximately 84% of students qualify for free or reduced price lunch. Less than 1% are English Language Learners (ELL), and about 15% have Individualized Education Programs (IEPs).

Midfield City Schools have an overall graduation rate of 77%. Approximately 65% of Midfield students meet or exceed state proficiency standards in mathematics, and about 74% meet or exceed standards in reading.

== Governance ==
The Midfield Board of Education is a five-member body that is appointed by the mayor of Midfield. The Midfield Board of Education adopts policy for the daily operation of schools and ensure that regulations are explained, enforced and observed. Each member serves a five-year term, and board members elect a president and vice president annually. The following individuals are members of the board (2015):

- Verrazano Davis
- Larry Merriweather
- Felecia Minor
- John Ware
- Nathan Williams

== Failing schools ==
Statewide testing ranks the schools in Alabama. Those in the bottom six percent are listed as "failing." As of early 2018, both Midfield High School and Rutledge School were included in this category.
