= Anez Cooper =

American football player (born 2004)

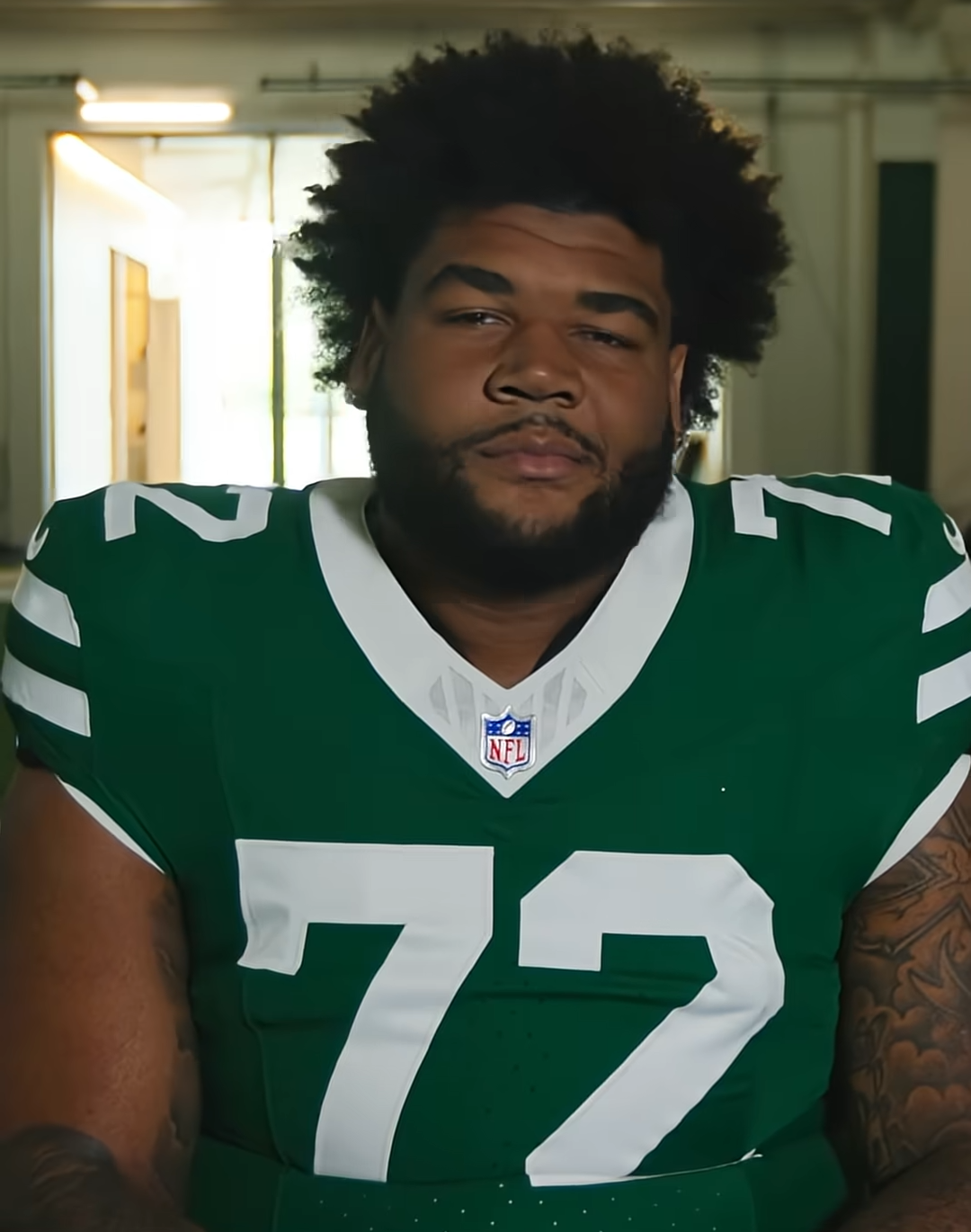
- Cooper with the New York Jets in 2026

No. 72 – New York Jets
- Position: Guard
- Roster status: Injured reserve

Personal information
- Born: January 6, 2004 (age 22)
- Listed height: 6 ft 6 in (1.98 m)
- Listed weight: 334 lb (151 kg)

Career information
- High school: Pleasant Grove (Pleasant Grove, Alabama)
- College: Miami (FL) (2022–2025)
- NFL draft: 2026: 6th round, 188th overall pick

Career history
- New York Jets (2026–present)

Awards and highlights
- Second-team All-ACC (2025)
- Stats at Pro Football Reference

Anez Cooper (born January 6, 2004) is an American professional football guard for the New York Jets of the National Football League (NFL). He played college football for the Miami Hurricanes and was selected by the Jets in the sixth round of the 2026 NFL draft.

== Early life ==
Cooper attended Pleasant Grove High School located in Pleasant Grove, Alabama. Coming out of high school, he committed to play college football for the Miami Hurricanes over offers from other schools such as Auburn, Georgia, and Oregon.

== College career ==
In week nine of the 2022 season, Cooper made his first collegiate start in a win versus Virginia. He finished the 2022 season, appearing in ten games while making four starts. Cooper took over as the team's starting right guard in 2023, starting in all 13 games. During the 2024 season, he once again started all 13 games at right guard. During his senior season in 2025, Cooper started all 16 games at right guard, as he helped Miami to a National Championship appearance. After the conclusion of the 2025 season, he declared for the 2026 NFL draft.

== Professional career ==
Pre-draft measurables
Height	Weight	Arm length	Hand span	Wingspan	40-yard dash	10-yard split	20-yard split
6 ft 5 7/8 in (1.98 m)	334 lb (151 kg)	34 in (0.86 m)	10 in (0.25 m)	6 ft 11 3/4 in (2.13 m)	5.63 s	1.94 s	3.26 s
All values from NFL Combine/Pro Day

Cooper was selected by the New York Jets in the sixth round with the 188th overall pick of the 2026 NFL draft. He was placed on injured reserve due to a right shoulder injury on August 30, 2026.
