= Matt Mathews =

American comedian and photographer

- Born: January 13, 1993 (age 33); Birmingham, Alabama U.S.
- Occupations: Comedian, photographer, musician
- Spouse: Rob Killgore (m. 2016)
- Website: mattmathews.com

Matt Mathews is an American comedian, musician, and photographer. He is best known for his farm-themed comedy videos on TikTok, his national stand-up comedy tours, and his work in boudoir photography.

== Early life and education ==
Mathews was born and raised near Birmingham, Alabama. He graduated from McAdory High School in McCalla in 2011. He initially enrolled in a nursing program at Jefferson State Community College but left to pursue photography.

== Career ==
Mathews began working as a photographer at the age of 16, initially focusing on wedding photography. Later, he transitioned to boudoir photography after finding the niche. He operates a studio in downtown Birmingham.

In 2019, Mathews published his memoir, Uncovered: The Naked Truth of Life, Love and Addiction, in which he shared personal experiences, including childhood poverty, his mother's addiction and his journey toward self-acceptance.

During the COVID-19 pandemic, Mathews began posting comedic videos of his daily farm chores on TikTok, one of which garnered over 13 million views. His content, which blends humor with stories from his life on the farm and his experiences growing up gay in the South, quickly gained a wide following. This led to his debut national stand-up comedy tour in 2023, titled When That Thang Get Ta Thang'n.

In 2024, Mathews recorded his first comedy special at the Alabama Theatre and signed with Creative Artists Agency (CAA). He launched his second tour, Boujee on a Budget, later that year. Following a sold-out 52-city run, he announced more than 30 additional shows for 2025 with a finale at Birmingham's 17,000-seat Legacy Arena.

== Music ==
Encouraged by singer-songwriter Jewel, Mathews began pursuing a career in country music. He has released debut singles, including "Joke's On Me" and "What a War". His full-length, self-titled country album is scheduled for release in fall 2025. In May 2025, Mathews performed songs from the upcoming album at a benefit event in Birmingham supporting the Animal League of Birmingham.

== Personal life ==
Mathews is openly gay and married Rob Killgore in 2016. The couple lives on a farm near Birmingham, Alabama.

Mathews is an animal advocate and has spent years rehabilitating animals, particularly opossums. He is also a professional barrel racer and has qualified for the world championships at least three times.
