= E.B. Erwin Middle School =

- 532 23rd Avenue NW; Center Point, Alabama; United States

Information
- Type: Public School
- Status: Open
- School district: Jefferson County Board of Education (Alabama)
- Grades: 6–8
- Campus type: Urban
- Colors: Royal blue, crimson, and white
- Slogan: SOAR. We are Students On Academic Rise!
- Mascot: Eagle

Eugene Brown Erwin Middle School is a public middle school in Center Point, Alabama, that serves grades 6-8. This middle school is part of the Jefferson County School System. It currently resides in the old E.B Erwin High School that closed when Center Point High School opened in 2011. The old high school was converted into a new middle school that now carries E.B. Erwin's name.

== Notable alumni ==
- Rod Rutledge, University of Alabama- NFL- New England Patriots

Kenneth Coley, University of Alabama

Dr. Jeff Laubenthal, University of Alabama-Baseball - SEC Scholar Athlete of the Year Recipient

Craig Bryant, University of North Alabama, Football & Baseball, Drafted by Seattle Mariners.

Dr. Sandra Sims, Physical Education Department Chair @ University of Alabama-Birmingham

Randy Putman, Alabama Junior College Hall of Fame, Athletics Director and Head Baseball Coach @ Wallace-Hanceville

Dr. Rob Pate, Auburn University, Football - All SEC
