= Fultondale High School =

Coordinates: 33.6270°N 86.7766°W

Location
- 2023 Wildcat Parkway; Fultondale, Alabama 35127; United States

Information
- Type: Public
- Established: 1965 (61 years ago)
- School district: Jefferson County Board of Education
- CEEB code: 012385
- Teaching staff: 48.50 (FTE)
- Grades: 7-12
- Enrollment: 848 (2024–2025)
- Student to teacher ratio: 17.48
- Campus: Suburban
- Colors: Orange, Blue, and White
- Athletics: AHSAA Class 4A
- Nickname: Wildcats
- Feeder schools: Fultondale Elementary School

Fultondale High School is a combined middle school and high school located in Fultondale, Alabama. It is one of fourteen schools within the Jefferson County School System. The school was destroyed in the tornado in 2021, then rebuilt. The new building opened on August 14, 2023.

School colors are navy blue and Burnt orange, and the athletic teams were called the Wildcats. Fultondale competes in AHSAA Class 4A athletics.

== History ==
Students in grades 10-12 formerly attended Gardendale High School. In 1965, a new school was built at the present Fultondale site and was named New Castle High School, with a vocational building being added in 1967. In the fall of 1972, students from Fultondale Elementary and the Smithfield area merged with the students at New Castle High School. The Jefferson County Board of Education then changed the school's name to Fultondale High School.

At the time of this merger, Jack Hazelrig was the principal at Fultondale Elementary. He was appointed by the board to be the first principal of Fultondale High School. The school housed grades 7-12 in its first year but was changed to an 8-12 school the next year. Fultondale High saw its first graduating class with the class of 1973.

Starting in the 2013-2014 school year, 6th graders from Fultondale Elementary began attending Fultondale High due to overcrowding at the elementary school.

On January 25, 2021, the town of Fultondale was struck by an EF3 tornado. The high school sustained significant structural damage, and athletic facilities were destroyed.

=== Rebuilding ===
Plans to build a new school in Fultondale began in 2018, when the Jefferson County Board of Education announced in March the existence of the project, alongside plans to renovate other area schools. The high school was estimated to come at a cost of $38.5 million ($49.36 million adjusted). In 2019, the project and a tax to finance it had been approved, and improvements to the district began in August 2019.

An EF3 tornado struck the old Fultondale High School on January 25, 2021. Significant damage to the school occurred, described as looking "like a bomb went off", and one of the school's students had died while sheltering in their home's basement. Following the tornado, it was announced the school would resume operation via remote learning until that March, when students would return to on-campus learning at Warrior Elementary School in Warrior, Alabama.

The school was set to open by August 8, 2023, the first day of the 2023–2024 school year, but was delayed. The school officially opened with its first day of on-campus learning on August 14, 2023.

== Student profile ==
Enrollment in grades 6-12 for the 2013-14 school year was 637 students. Approximately 48% of students were white, 31% were African-American, 19% were Hispanic, and 2% were multiracial. Roughly 62% of students qualified for free or reduced price lunch.

Fultondale had a graduation rate of 73% in 2014. Approximately 73% of its students met or exceeded state proficiency standards in mathematics, and 85% met or exceeded standards in reading. The average ACT score for Fultondale students was 24.

== Athletics ==
Fultondale competed in AHSAA Class 4A athletics and fields teams in the following sports:

- Baseball
- Basketball
- Cheerleading
- Cross Country
- Football
- Golf
- Indoor Track & Field
- Outdoor Track & Field
- Soccer
- Softball
- Volleyball
- Wrestling

Fultondale won state championships in wrestling in 1992, 1994, and 1995.

== Notable alumni ==
- ArDarius Stewart, Wide receiver for the B.C. Lions
