= Fultondale, Alabama =

City in Alabama, United States

Fultondale
- City
- Logo
- Motto: "A Friendly City"
- Location of Fultondale in Jefferson County, Alabama.
- Coordinates: 33°38′05″N 86°46′47″W
- Country: United States
- State: Alabama
- County: Jefferson
- Established: 1947

Area
  - Total: 12.14 sq mi (31.43 km^{2})
  - Land: 12.14 sq mi (31.43 km^{2})
  - Water: 0 sq mi (0.00 km^{2})
- Elevation: 509 ft (155 m)

Population (2020)
  - Total: 9,876
  - Density: 813.7/sq mi (314.19/km^{2})
- Time zone: UTC-6 (Central (CST))
  - Summer (DST): UTC-5 (CDT)
- ZIP code: 35068
- Area codes: 205 & 659
- FIPS code: 01-28552
- GNIS feature ID: 2403671
- Website: City of Fultondale

Fultondale is a city in Jefferson County, Alabama, United States and a northern suburb of Birmingham. As of the 2020 census, Fultondale had a population of 9,876.

== History ==
Fulton was a mining town in the 1900s. Fulton was incorporated in 1947. The town's name is derived from the combination of the names of two nearby communities, Fulton Springs and Glendale.

This area was once known as Fulton Springs. Prior to the building of Interstate 65, US 31 was the main route for travelers northbound from Birmingham towards Nashville, Tennessee. As a result, hotels such as the Keystone Lodge and Buchmann Motor Inn prospered. On the city's southern edge was located one of the few drive-in theatres in the Birmingham area (the "Skyview"). This was torn down when I-65 was built in the late 1960s and early 1970s. The Pine Bowl bowling alley is still a long time fixture in the city. Traces of the old routing of US 31 are still noticeable in the city. From just south of the city hall to an old bridge on this city's northern side, most of this old routing is known as Stouts Road or in some cases simply "old US 31."

Fultondale was a relatively stagnant community until the last decade. Growth has occurred in residential areas mainly west of Interstate 65, while retail development has focused along and near the I-65/Walkers Chapel Road exit.

In the early 2000s, the Chapel Hills subdivision was begun on the west side of I-65 off of Ellard Road. In the years following, other new subdivisions have been built off of US Highway 31 including Black Creek Station, Town Square, and Fulton Springs.

On January 25, 2021, an EF3 tornado impacted Fultondale causing significant structural damage to numerous homes, vehicles, and businesses with several being severely damaged or destroyed. One person was killed and 30 others were injured.

== Geography ==
According to the U.S. Census Bureau, the city has a total area of 12.2 square miles (32 km^{2}), all land. Fultondale is located along one of the many ridgelines that comprise the southern end of the Appalachian Mountain chain. The area has been thoroughly mined for coal and other minerals in the past 100 years. The city is served by two major north–south highways, Interstate 65 and US Highway 31. The new Interstate 22 encroaches on the city's western edge and on June 20, 2016, the interchange with I-65 just south of Fultondale opened. I-22 will provide direct interstate access to Memphis, Tennessee. Upon completion of Interstate 22, Fultondale will become the fourth Alabama city (after Birmingham, Montgomery, and Mobile) to be directly served by more than one two-digit interstate highway (I-65 & I-22). The only east/west thoroughfare of note is Walkers Chapel Road (west of US 31) and New Castle Road (east of US 31). Rail lines run north–south along the city's eastern edge from Boyles Yard in Tarrant to points north and east. Air travel is available from nearby Birmingham International Airport.

== Demographics ==
Historical population
Census	Pop.	Note	%±
1950	1,304		—
1960	2,001		53.5%
1970	5,163		158.0%
1980	6,217		20.4%
1990	6,400		2.9%
2000	6,595		3.0%
2010	8,380		27.1%
2020	9,876		17.9%
2025 (est.)	9,307	▼	−5.8%
U.S. Decennial Census

=== Racial and ethnic composition ===
Fultondale city, Alabama – Racial and ethnic composition Note: the US Census treats Hispanic/Latino as an ethnic category. This table excludes Latinos from the racial categories and assigns them to a separate category. Hispanics/Latinos may be of any race.
Race / Ethnicity (NH = Non-Hispanic)	Pop 1980	Pop 1990	Pop 2000	Pop 2010	Pop 2020	% 1980	% 1990	% 2000	% 2010	% 2020
White alone (NH)	6,159	6,228	6,003	5,833	4,877	99.07%	97.31%	91.02%	69.61%	49.38%
Black or African American alone (NH)	12	107	351	1,389	3,132	0.19%	1.67%	5.32%	16.58%	31.71%
Native American or Alaska Native alone (NH)	7	14	42	33	15	0.11%	0.22%	0.64%	0.39%	0.15%
Asian alone (NH)	0	17	25	83	127	0.00%	0.27%	0.38%	0.99%	1.29%
Native Hawaiian or Pacific Islander alone (NH)	x	x	0	5	0	x	x	0.00%	0.06%	0.00%
Other race alone (NH)	0	0	3	3	36	0.00%	0.00%	0.05%	0.04%	0.36%
Mixed race or Multiracial (NH)	x	x	66	125	328	x	x	1.00%	1.49%	3.32%
Hispanic or Latino (any race)	39	34	105	909	1,361	0.63%	0.53%	1.59%	10.85%	13.78%
Total	6,217	6,400	6,595	8,380	9,876	100.00%	100.00%	100.00%	100.00%	100.00%

=== 2020 census ===
As of the 2020 census, Fultondale had a population of 9,876. The median age was 35.6 years. 23.1% of residents were under the age of 18 and 14.0% of residents were 65 years of age or older. For every 100 females there were 92.0 males, and for every 100 females age 18 and over there were 86.2 males age 18 and over.

97.9% of residents lived in urban areas, while 2.1% lived in rural areas.

There were 4,150 households and 2,393 families in Fultondale; 31.4% had children under the age of 18 living in them. Of all households, 39.6% were married-couple households, 19.4% were households with a male householder and no spouse or partner present, and 33.9% were households with a female householder and no spouse or partner present. About 30.8% of all households were made up of individuals and 9.2% had someone living alone who was 65 years of age or older.

There were 4,380 housing units, of which 5.3% were vacant. The homeowner vacancy rate was 1.5% and the rental vacancy rate was 7.4%.

=== 2010 census ===
At the 2010 census, there were 8,380 people, 3,504 households, and 2,269 families living in the city. The population density was 681.3 inhabitants per square mile (263.1/km^{2}). There were 3,758 housing units at an average density of 305.5 per square mile (118.0/km^{2}). The racial makeup of the city was 75.1% White, 16.6% Black or African American, 0.4% Native American, 1.0% Asian, 4.6% from other races, and 2.0% from two or more races. 10.8% of the population were Hispanic or Latino of any race.

Of the 3,504 households 28.3% had children under the age of 18 living with them, 44.9% were married couples living together, 14.8% had a female householder with no husband present, and 35.2% were non-families. 29.9% of households were one person and 9.1% were one person aged 65 or older. The average household size was 2.39 and the average family size was 2.95.

The age distribution was 23.1% under the age of 18, 8.8% from 18 to 24, 32.1% from 25 to 44, 23.3% from 45 to 64, and 12.7% 65 or older. The median age was 34.5 years. For every 100 females, there were 92.6 males. For every 100 females age 18 and over, there were 93.2 males.

The median household income was $44,880 and the median family income was $55,565. Males had a median income of $43,109 versus $35,051 for females. The per capita income for the city was $24,903. About 8.1% of families and 11.3% of the population were below the poverty line, including 20.3% of those under age 18 and 9.1% of those age 65 or over.

== Government ==
The current mayor is Larry Holcomb, who is in his first term. Members of the City Council are Billy Hughes, Josh Bryant, Timothy McWilliams, Kristi Jennings and Jimmie H. Lay.

In August 2016, then-Mayor Jim Lowery narrowly won the election against candidate Larry Holcomb a former Fultondale fireman, which began Jim Lowery's sixth four-year term.

Four years later, on August 26, 2020, Larry Holcomb won the election for mayor with 983 votes to Jim Lowery's 750 votes. Three other incumbents were unseated in this election. Kristi Jennings defeated incumbent Joe Bolton with 1,096 votes to Bolton's 620 votes. Timothy McWilliams earned 986 votes in his victory against incumbent Tommy Loden, who earned 712 votes. Billy Hughes defeated incumbent Darrell Bates with 1,100 votes to Bates' 598 votes.

== Media ==
Fultondale is located in the Birmingham TV and radio market. It was once served by two newspapers, the Birmingham News (originally daily, then three print editions per week before shutting down its presses and going digital-only; and The North Jefferson News, a weekly (and briefly twice-weekly) that closed in 2020.

== Education ==
Fultondale is served by Jefferson County Schools. Fultondale High School is located on Carson Road on the northeast side of the city. Fultondale Elementary School serves grades PreK-6th grade and is located on the southern end of the city off of US Highway 31. In 2020, it was announced that Fultondale High School will get a new building and the Jefferson County International Baccalaureate School will move to the current high school location once renovations are completed. The school is nicknamed the Wildcats (and Junior Wildcats) and both schools' colors are orange and navy blue.

== Retail and commercial ==
Due to difficult topography, for many years Fultondale was limited in its ability to grow. However, as technology improved, the ability to convert what had been difficult to unusable land for retail and commercial purposes improved. The Colonial Promenade Fultondale development was a project of Colonial Properties and the first portion opened in the fall of 2007. It is home to many large as well as small retailers, shops and restaurants. Besides the retail development of Colonial Promenade, other retail development nearby includes various chain restaurants and large retailers. Other older, more mature business establishments line US 31 in the center of the community including supermarkets, casual fast food, banks, a bowling alley and skating rink.

== Parks and recreation ==
Fultondale's Black Creek Park is situated adjacent to Black Creek and includes batting cages, the Senior Center, walking trails, the Children's Park, and the Fultondale Bark Park with separate play areas for small and large dogs. The dog park is home to the annual Barking at the Moon Festival. The nature trail along Black Creek is part of a rails-to-trails project of approximately three miles in length and crosses historic Stouts Road.

The city also maintains a park and sports complex across from Fultondale Elementary School that is home to the Fultondale Youth Football and Cheer Association games.
