= Jefferson State Community College =

Public college in Alabama, US

Coordinates: 33.38521°N 86.73103°W

- Former name: Jefferson State Junior College
- Type: Community college
- Established: 1965
- President: Keith Brown
- Students: 8,512
- Location: Center Point, Alabama; Hoover, Alabama; Pell City, Alabama; Clanton, Alabama, United States
- Website: http://www.jeffersonstate.edu

Jefferson State Community College (informally Jeff State) is a public community college with multiple campuses in Alabama, including the Jefferson Campus in northeastern Birmingham, Alabama (eastern Jefferson County), the Shelby-Hoover Campus in northern Shelby County, the St. Clair-Pell City Campus in Pell City, and the Chilton-Clanton Campus in Clanton. It is the largest college in the Alabama Community College System.

== Accreditation ==
Jefferson State is accredited by the Commission on Colleges of the Southern Association of Colleges and Schools to award the associate degree. Individual academic programs are nationally accredited by 10 different professional evaluating organizations

Huntingdon College offers a bachelor's degree program that has classes at two of Jeff State's campuses. The courses are accelerated so that students can attend class one night a week and complete their bachelor's degree in a traditional time frame. Classes last 5 weeks and students can receive financial aid through Huntingdon for this program.

== History ==
Jefferson State Junior College was established on May 3, 1963, by an act of the State Legislature. The first students enrolled at Jeff State in September 1965. The Alabama State Board of Education officially changed the name of the school to Jefferson State Community College on February 23, 1989.

The original campus is located on 274 acres (1.11 km^{2}) in Center Point, Alabama. The thirteen buildings that make up the campus are named for community benefactors (H.Y. and Ruby Carson, John B. Bethune, Harvey DeRamus, and Eugene Fitzgerald), elected officials (James B. Allen, George C. Wallace, Lurleen B. Wallace, and Harold C. Martin), and former Jeff State presidents (Leroy Brown and George L. Layton).

The college opened an extension center in Shelby County, Alabama in January 1993. In June 1996, the center was designated a branch campus by the Alabama Commission on Higher Education. The Shelby Campus in Hoover, Alabama has buildings on 60 acres (240,000 m^{2}) and is adding a manufacturing center in late 2020.

In 2003, the Alabama State Board of Education revised the college's service area to include the western part of St. Clair County, Alabama. Classes began meeting at the St. Clair Center in Moody, Alabama in Fall 2003. On April 22, 2004, the board approved another instructional site for St. Clair County in Pell City, Alabama, and classes started meeting there in Fall 2004. With 50 acres (200,000 m^{2}) deeded to the school by the St. Clair Economic Development Council, Jeff State constructed a new center in Pell City. The college offered classes in that three-story facility in Fall 2006.

In 2007, the Board again revised the college's service area to include Chilton County, Alabama and approved construction for a multipurpose instructional facility in Clanton, Alabama. The new center was completed and classes began in Fall 2008.

Jeff State has had four presidents: Dr. Leroy Brown (1964-1971), Dr. George L. Layton (1971-1979), Dr. Judy M. Merritt (1979-2014), and Keith Brown (2018–present; interim: 2014–2018)

== Campuses ==
The Shelby-Hoover campus is in Shelby County, partially in the City of Hoover and partially in an unincorporated area. The Math-Science Building and the General Studies Building are in Hoover while the Health Science Building is located across the city line. The Birmingham Supplementary School Inc. (BSS, バーミングハム日本語補習校 Bāminguhamu Nihongo Hoshūkō), a part-time Japanese school, holds its classes at the Shelby-Hoover campus, while its office is at the Honda Manufacturing of Alabama, LLC facility in unincorporated Talladega County, near Lincoln. The school first opened on September 1, 2001.

== Libraries ==
A fully stocked academic library is located at all four locations of Jeff State. The libraries contain over 135,000 items including books, periodicals, videos, and government documents. Access to over 52,000 electronic books and millions of articles is available through the library's website.

== Facts ==
Jefferson State was also home to WJSR radio. The station went silent in 2014.

Approximately 10,004 students enrolled in 2010, the highest enrollment ever seen at the college.

Beta Lambda Delta, the Shelby Campus chapter of two year institution Honor's Society Phi Theta Kappa, came in as Fourth Alternate internationally in 2007, taking home 7 awards total. In 2008, the Beta Lambda Delta Chapter was named Most Distinguished Chapter International, the highest award available to a Phi Theta Kappa chapter. The chapter also received the award in 2009, the first time a chapter has taken the top honor two years in a row, in over 30 years.

Jeff State's Students in Free Enterprise, SIFE, Team received the second runner-up award at the SIFE Regional Competition in Atlanta, GA, on Monday, April 4, 2011.
