= McAdory High School =

Location
- 4800 McAdory School Road; McCalla, Alabama 35111; United States; 33°19′49″N 87°00′06″W

Information
- Type: Public
- Established: 1920 (106 years ago)
- School district: Jefferson County Schools
- Principal: Cedric Buchannon
- Teaching staff: 65.00 (FTE)
- Grades: 9 – 12
- Student to teacher ratio: 19.08
- Colors: Black and gold
- Athletics conference: AHSAA Class 6A Region 4
- Mascot: Yellow Jacket
- Feeder schools: McAdory Middle School
- Website: www.jefcoed.com/o/mcadoryhs

McAdory High School (MHS) is a four-year public high school in the Birmingham, Alabama suburb of McCalla. It is one of fourteen high schools in the Jefferson County School System and was named for early local educator Isaac McAdory. School colors are black and gold, and the athletic teams are called the Yellowjackets. MHS competes in Alabama High School Athletic Association (AHSAA) Class 6A athletics.

== Student Profile ==
Enrollment in grades 9-12 for the 2013-14 school year is 975 students. Approximately 48% of students are white, 46% are African-American, 5% are Hispanic, and 1% are multiracial. Roughly 40% of students qualify for free or reduced price lunch.

MHS has a graduation rate of 92%. Approximately 6% of its students meet or exceed state proficiency standards in mathematics, and 18% meet or exceed standards in reading. The average ACT score for MHS students is 21.

== History ==
In 1916, land from the McAdory family was purchased and a high school was built, opening its doors in 1920. In the early morning hours of April 5, 1929, a fire destroyed most of the school. Its four-room annex was undamaged and classes continued there for the school's 320 students. The first section of a replacement building opened in 1929, and the remaining sections opened in 1931. On December 18, 1938, another fire destroyed this building. A replacement school in the Art-Deco style was built as a Works Progress Administration (WPA) project. It opened in 1941 and is the building used today.

In 2006, a building renovation was started.

From 1920 until 1996, the McAdory School campus was K-12; that last year the elementary grades were re-located to a new school in Tannehill Valley, a few years later a new school was also constructed for the Middle School at an adjacent campus to McAdory High School.

== Athletics ==
MHS competes in AHSAA Class 6A athletics. It fields teams in the following sports:

- Baseball
- Basketball (boys and girls)
- Cheerleading
- Cross Country (boys and girls)
- Soccer (boys and girls)
- Football
- Softball
- Track and Field (boys and girls)
- Tennis (boys and girls)
- Volleyball
- Wrestling
- Golf
- Dodgeball (boys and girls)
- Swimming (boys and girls)

MHS has won four AHSAA state championships: baseball in (1995), twice in and boys' track and field (1954 and 1980), and most recently the state wrestling team championship (2019) under Coach Blake Dutton.

The McAdory High School Yellow Jackets football team has a record of 489-390-25 over the team's history, which ranks it among the top five winning percentages among all high schools in Jefferson County. Their longest rivalry is with Fairfield High School, whom they have met 58 times. Fairfield leads the series 34-23-1. Before 1970, Alabama had no football playoff system and teams were often "declared" as a "mythical" State Champion by various newspapers around the state. In 1953, McAdory (then a 2A high school) posted a very strong team that went 9-1 (including two victories in the same season over Hueytown High School, with the second game being the "Dental Clinic Classic" which the Yellow Jackets won by a score of 18-0). That Yellow Jackets football team scored 179 points and surrendered only 63. Seven of its players were named to All-Star teams and two of them were selected to play in the All-Star game hosted by the University of Alabama. The two players were Richard Autry (offensive center) and Clay Walls (quarterback). The 1953 McAdory squad was "declared" as "State Champions" by both the Birmingham News and the Birmingham Post-Herald newspapers. Between 1948 and 1995, a “Jefferson County Championship” was awarded in the Dental Clinic Classic played between two of the county's best teams. McAdory won this game nine times, with wins in 1950, 1952, 1953, 1979, 1980, 1981, 1988, 1989, and 1994.

== Notable alumni ==
- Bo Jackson, 1985 Heisman Trophy winner from Auburn University, former MLB player (Kansas City Royals, Chicago White Sox, California Angels) and NFL player (Los Angeles Raiders)
- Vicki Hollub, CEO of Occidental Petroleum from 2016–present
- Matt Mathews, comedian, musician, and photographer
- Chad Smith, current pitcher, Oakland Athletics
