= Center Point, Alabama =

City in Alabama, United States

Center Point
- City
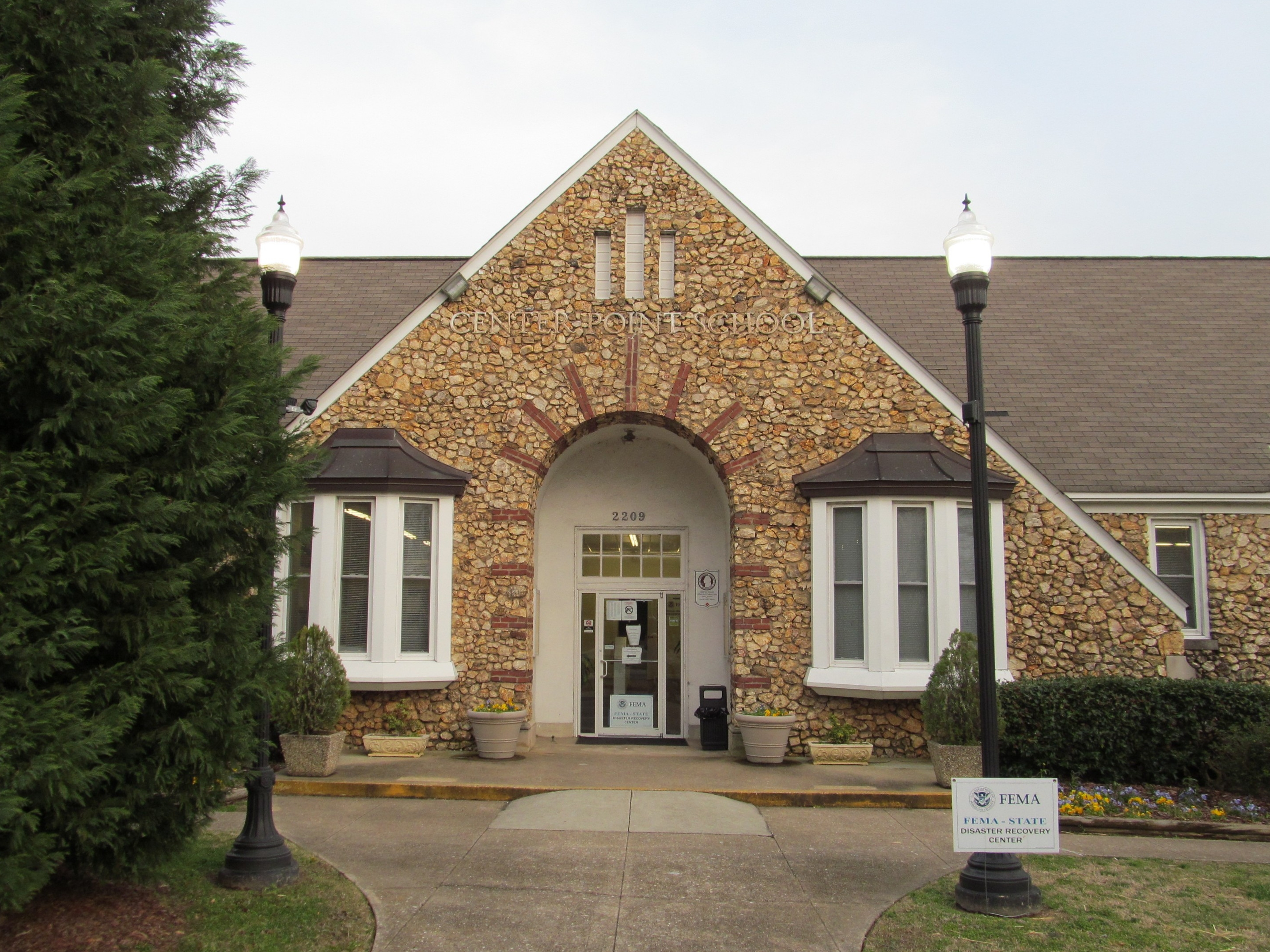
- Center Point City Hall

- Flag Seal

- Location of Center Point in Jefferson County, Alabama.
- Coordinates: 33°38′41″N 86°41′07″W
- Country: United States
- State: Alabama
- County: Jefferson

Area
  - Total: 6.22 sq mi (16.12 km^{2})
  - Land: 6.22 sq mi (16.10 km^{2})
  - Water: 0.0077 sq mi (0.02 km^{2})
- Elevation: 850 ft (260 m)

Population (2020)
  - Total: 16,406
  - Density: 2,639.8/sq mi (1,019.22/km^{2})
- Time zone: UTC-6 (Central (CST))
  - Summer (DST): UTC-5 (CDT)
- ZIP code: 35215
- Area codes: 205 & 659
- FIPS code: 01-13264
- GNIS feature ID: 2404020
- Website: https://www.cityofcenterpoint.org/

Center Point is a city and a former census-designated place (CDP) in northeastern Jefferson County, Alabama, United States. It is part of the Birmingham metropolitan area. At the 2020 census, the population was 16,406. However, after its incorporation in 2002, the city's boundaries are much smaller than those of the CDP. As of the 2010 census, the population of the incorporated city was 16,921. The public high school for Center Point is Center Point High School grades 9th-12th. The public middle school for Center Point is Erwin Middle School grades 6th-8th. Center Point has 2 public elementary schools, Erwin Intermediate School grades 3rd-5th and Center Point Elementary School grades K-2nd. Center Point current mayor is Bobby Scott, who was elected October 6, 2020.

== History ==
The city of Center Point originally started as a small farm community, founded by the Reed family of North Carolina, which was around the same time other families were coming in to settle the towns of Trussville, Springville, Clay, and Pinson. By 1924, the Rock School was built, which now stands as the Center Point City Hall, as well as several business such as a post office and blacksmith shop. Center Point remained an unincorporated and small community from the 1920s through the 1950s, but in 1947 a viable water supply was discovered enabling Center Point to become self-sufficient and set up for further development. During the 1950s, there was steady growth in the area as more people continued to move eastward from the center of Birmingham, seeing the nearby neighborhoods East Lake, Huffman, and Roebuck swell with new houses and people. However, by the 1960s, Center Point began to rapidly develop, with over 80% of all homes in city limits built within a ten-year span from 1960 to 1970. The rapid growth soon overcrowded Hewitt-Trussville High School in nearby Trussville past capacity limit, which had been the high school serving Center Point for decades. Jefferson County Schools soon elected to introduce a new high school, E.B. Erwin High School in 1965. By 1967, Center Point was recognized as the largest census-designated place (CDP) in the United States with over 67,000 people. From the 1970s through mid-1990s, Center Point was a thriving suburb of Birmingham and was one of the largest surrounding communities. By the late 1990s however, urban blight, financial decay, and violence had already plagued Birmingham's eastern neighborhoods such as Woodlawn and East Lake, which soon began to spill into still unincorporated Center Point. The decay was accelerated by the clearing/demolition of East Lake housing bordering Birmingham-Shuttlesworth International Airport, which the city of Birmingham was attempting to expand, as well as the rapid annexation attempts made by the city around Center Point and other areas in the 1980s-1990s. The city paid the East Lake homeowners relocation money as reimbursement for the house and property. The decay brought about a severe socioeconomic shift, which saw the complete demographic flip of the area addition to financial and retail losses to newly growing suburbs around Birmingham. The city incorporated in 2002 in a rush for control over their own fate and to deter any further control measures/annexation by the city of Birmingham. Eventually, this decay led to the area's school quality decline and began to display the rarely-observed “suburban blight”. By 2020 according to the U.S. Census, the city had reached a point where over 1/3 of the city was below the poverty level, in addition to high crime rates, murder rates, and falling population.

On January 23, 2012, an intense EF3 tornado struck the city, which destroyed the Center Point Elementary School buildings as well as dozens of structures throughout the city.

== Geography ==
According to the U.S. Census Bureau, the CDP had a total area of 8.1 square miles (21 km^{2}), of which 8.1 square miles (21 km^{2}) was land and 0.04 square miles (0.10 km^{2}) (0.25%) was water.

== Demographics ==
Historical population
Census	Pop.	Note	%±
1970	15,675		—
1980	23,317		48.8%
1990	22,658		−2.8%
2000	22,784		0.6%
2010	16,921		−25.7%
2020	16,406		−3.0%
2025 (est.)	15,538	▼	−5.3%
U.S. Decennial Census

Center Point was listed as a census designated place in the 1980 U.S. Census; and after incorporation, as a city in the 2020 U.S. Census.

=== Racial and ethnic composition ===
Center Point city, Alabama – Racial and ethnic composition Note: the US Census treats Hispanic/Latino as an ethnic category. This table excludes Latinos from the racial categories and assigns them to a separate category. Hispanics/Latinos may be of any race.
Race / Ethnicity (NH = Non-Hispanic)	Pop 1980	Pop 1990	Pop 2000	Pop 2010	Pop 2020	% 1980	% 1990	% 2000	% 2010	% 2020
White alone (NH)	22,990	21,567	16,375	5,268	2,799	98.60%	95.18%	71.87%	31.13%	17.06%
Black or African American alone (NH)	128	876	5,494	10,582	12,134	0.55%	3.87%	24.11%	62.54%	73.96%
Native American or Alaska Native alone (NH)	24	37	63	31	26	0.10%	0.16%	0.28%	0.18%	0.16%
Asian alone (NH)	8	68	122	52	33	0.03%	0.30%	0.54%	0.31%	0.20%
Native Hawaiian or Pacific Islander alone (NH)	x	x	7	4	10	x	x	0.03%	0.02%	0.06%
Other race alone (NH)	18	3	14	25	50	0.08%	0.01%	0.06%	0.15%	0.30%
Mixed race or Multiracial (NH)	x	x	202	153	417	x	x	0.89%	0.90%	2.54%
Hispanic or Latino (any race)	149	107	507	806	937	0.64%	0.47%	2.23%	4.76%	5.71%
Total	23,317	22,658	22,784	16,921	16,406	100.00%	100.00%	100.00%	100.00%	100.00%

=== 2020 census ===
As of the 2020 census, there were 16,406 people, 5,979 households, and 4,018 families residing in Center Point. The median age was 34.4 years. 28.1% of residents were under the age of 18 and 12.4% were 65 years of age or older. For every 100 females there were 83.5 males, and for every 100 females age 18 and over there were 76.1 males age 18 and over.

100.0% of residents lived in urban areas, while 0.0% lived in rural areas.

There were 5,979 households in Center Point, of which 38.2% had children under the age of 18 living in them. Of all households, 32.1% were married-couple households, 17.5% were households with a male householder and no spouse or partner present, and 44.4% were households with a female householder and no spouse or partner present. About 26.4% of all households were made up of individuals and 9.2% had someone living alone who was 65 years of age or older.

There were 6,932 housing units, of which 13.7% were vacant. The homeowner vacancy rate was 2.6% and the rental vacancy rate was 15.4%.

=== 2010 census ===
According to the 2010 census, there were 16,921 people living in the City of Center Point. The racial / ethnic makeup of Center Point was 32.6% White, 62.9% Black or African-American, 0.4% Asian, 0.2% Native American or Alaska Native, 0.02% Native Hawaiian, 2.8% other races, and 1.1% were two or more races. Hispanics of any race were 4.8% of the population.

=== 2000 census ===
At the 2000 census, there were 22,784 people, 8,826 households, and 6,434 families in the CDP. The population density was 2,830.4 inhabitants per square mile (1,092.8/km^{2}). There were 9,292 housing units at an average density of 1,154.3 per square mile (445.7/km^{2}). The racial makeup of the CDP was 72.90% White, 24.23% Black or African American, 0.28% Native American, 0.55% Asian, 0.03% Pacific Islander, 1.02% from other races, and 0.98% from two or more races. 2.23% of the population were Hispanic or Latino of any race.

Of the 8,826 households 35.3% had children under the age of 18 living with them, 53.7% were married couples living together, 15.4% had a female householder with no husband present, and 27.1% were non-families. 23.7% of households were one person and 8.6% were one person aged 65 or older. The average household size was 2.56 and the average family size was 3.02.

The age distribution was 26.6% under the age of 18, 8.8% from 18 to 24, 30.2% from 25 to 44, 21.3% from 45 to 64, and 13.1% 65 or older. The median age was 35 years. For every 100 females, there were 89.6 males. For every 100 females age 18 and over, there were 84.8 males.

The median household income was $40,929 and the median family income was $46,427. Males had a median income of $35,500 versus $25,544 for females. The per capita income for the CDP was $18,160. About 7.7% of families and 9.5% of the population were below the poverty line, including 12.2% of those under age 18 and 9.6% of those age 65 or over.

== Notable person ==
- Dan Sartain, rock and roll musician
