= Tarrant, Alabama =

City in Alabama, United States

Tarrant
- City
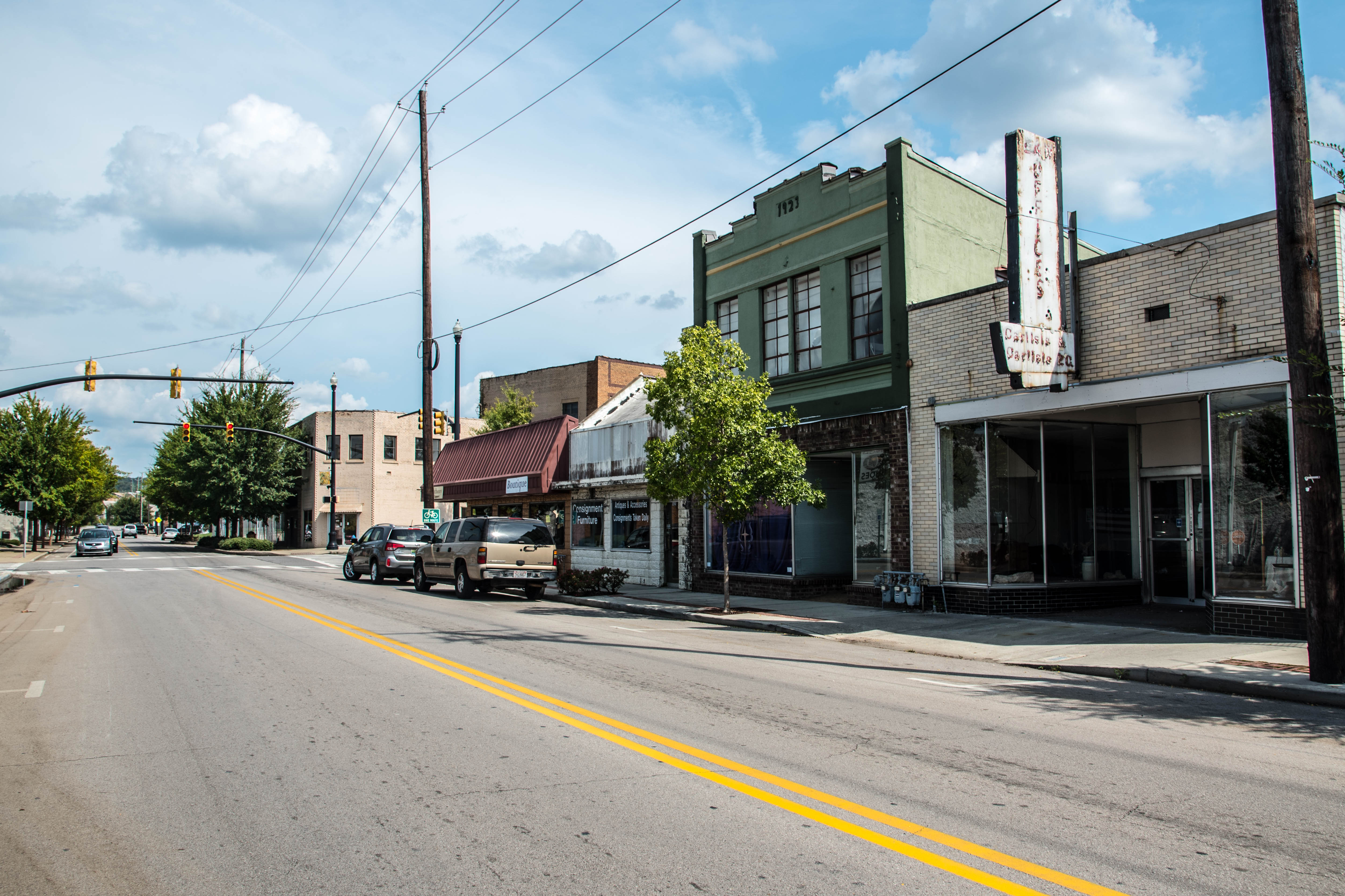
- Downtown Tarrant, Alabama

- Flag Logo

- Location of Tarrant in Jefferson County, Alabama.
- Coordinates: 33°35′50″N 86°45′58″W
- Country: United States
- State: Alabama
- County: Jefferson

Area
  - Total: 6.42 sq mi (16.63 km^{2})
  - Land: 6.37 sq mi (16.50 km^{2})
  - Water: 0.054 sq mi (0.14 km^{2})
- Elevation: 548 ft (167 m)

Population (2020)
  - Total: 6,124
  - Density: 961.5/sq mi (371.24/km^{2})
- Time zone: UTC-6 (Central (CST))
  - Summer (DST): UTC-5 (CDT)
- ZIP code: 35217
- Area codes: 205 & 659
- FIPS code: 01-74976
- GNIS feature ID: 2405570
- Website: http://www.cityoftarrant.com/

Tarrant is a city in Jefferson County, Alabama, bordering Birmingham's north side. At the 2020 census, the population was 6,124. It is home to the ABC Coke plant owned by the Drummond Company, "the largest single producer of foundry coke in the U.S.".

== Geography ==
According to the U.S. Census Bureau, the city has a total area of 6.4 square miles (17 km^{2}), of which 6.4 square miles (17 km^{2}) is land and 0.04 square miles (0.10 km^{2}) (0.63%) is water.

=== Climate ===
The climate in this area is characterized by hot, humid summers and generally mild to cool winters. According to the Köppen Climate Classification system, Tarrant has a humid subtropical climate, abbreviated "Cfa" on climate maps.

== Demographics ==
Historical population
Census	Pop.	Note	%±
1920	734		—
1930	7,341		900.1%
1940	6,833		−6.9%
1950	7,571		10.8%
1960	7,810		3.2%
1970	6,835		−12.5%
1980	8,148		19.2%
1990	8,046		−1.3%
2000	7,022		−12.7%
2010	6,397		−8.9%
2020	6,124		−4.3%
2025 (est.)	5,639	▼	−7.9%
U.S. Decennial Census; 2013 Estimate

=== Racial and ethnic composition ===
Tarrant city, Alabama – Racial and ethnic composition Note: the US Census treats Hispanic/Latino as an ethnic category. This table excludes Latinos from the racial categories and assigns them to a separate category. Hispanics/Latinos may be of any race.
Race / Ethnicity (NH = Non-Hispanic)	Pop 2000	Pop 2010	Pop 2020	% 2000	% 2010	% 2020
White alone (NH)	5,510	2,349	1,523	78.47%	36.72%	24.87%
Black or African American alone (NH)	1,306	3,330	3,098	18.60%	52.06%	50.59%
Native American or Alaska Native alone (NH)	25	25	12	0.36%	0.39%	0.20%
Asian alone (NH)	10	18	31	0.14%	0.28%	0.51%
Native Hawaiian or Pacific Islander alone (NH)	1	20	63	0.01%	0.31%	1.03%
Other race alone (NH)	1	3	23	0.01%	0.05%	0.38%
Mixed race or Multiracial (NH)	49	74	155	0.70%	1.16%	2.53%
Hispanic or Latino (any race)	120	578	1,219	1.71%	9.04%	19.91%
Total	7,022	6,397	6,124	100.00%	100.00%	100.00%

=== 2020 census ===
As of the 2020 census, there were 6,124 people and 2,313 households in the city, including 1,203 families. The median age was 36.7 years. 26.1% of residents were under the age of 18 and 15.1% of residents were 65 years of age or older. For every 100 females, there were 88.0 males, and for every 100 females age 18 and over, there were 82.6 males age 18 and over.

99.2% of residents lived in urban areas, while 0.8% lived in rural areas.

Of the city's 2,313 households, 33.2% had children under the age of 18 living in them. Of all households, 28.0% were married-couple households, 23.0% were households with a male householder and no spouse or partner present, and 43.6% were households with a female householder and no spouse or partner present. About 34.2% of all households were made up of individuals, and 14.2% had someone living alone who was 65 years of age or older.

There were 2,770 housing units, of which 16.5% were vacant. The homeowner vacancy rate was 2.5%, and the rental vacancy rate was 13.5%.

=== 2010 census ===
At the 2010 census, there were 6,397 people, 2,307 households, and 1,520 families living in the city. The population density was 999.5 inhabitants per square mile (385.9/km^{2}). There were 2,804 housing units at an average density of 438.1 units per square mile (169.2 units/km^{2}). The racial makeup of the city was 52.3% Black or African American, 39.0% White, 0.8% Native American, 0.3% Asian, 0.8% Pacific Islander, 5.3% from other races, and 1.5% from two or more races. 9.0% of the population were Hispanic or Latino of any race.

Of the 2,307 households 30.6% had children under the age of 18 living with them, 30.1% were married couples living together, 29.3% had a female householder with no husband present, and 34.1% were non-families. 29.1% of households were one person and 11.7% were one person aged 65 or older. The average household size was 2.72 and the average family size was 3.38.

The age distribution was 28.5% under the age of 18, 9.7% from 18 to 24, 24.6% from 25 to 44, 24.0% from 45 to 64, and 13.2% 65 or older. The median age was 34.1 years. For every 100 females, there were 84.0 males. For every 100 females age 18 and over, there were 88.0 males.

The median household income was $28,385 and the median family income was $30,938. Males had a median income of $25,451 versus $25,521 for females. The per capita income for the city was $13,990. About 25.0% of families and 30.2% of the population were below the poverty line, including 50.3% of those under age 18 and 6.9% of those age 65 or over.

=== 2000 census ===
At the 2000 census, there were 7,022 people, 2,896 households, and 1,922 families living in the city. The population density was 1,104.7 inhabitants per square mile (426.5/km^{2}). There were 3,277 housing units at an average density of 515.5 units per square mile (199.0 units/km^{2}). The racial makeup of the city was 79.14% White, 18.73% Black or African American, 0.37% Native American, 0.14% Asian, 0.01% Pacific Islander, 0.84% from other races, and 0.77% from two or more races. 1.71% of the population were Hispanic or Latino of any race.

Of the 2,896 households 28.3% had children under the age of 18 living with them, 45.5% were married couples living together, 17.0% had a female householder with no husband present, and 33.6% were non-families. 29.7% of households were one person and 15.2% were one person aged 65 or older. The average household size was 2.42 and the average family size was 3.01.

The age distribution was 24.3% under the age of 18, 8.3% from 18 to 24, 28.1% from 25 to 44, 21.9% from 45 to 64, and 17.3% 65 or older. The median age was 38 years. For every 100 females, there were 88.5 males. For every 100 females age 18 and over, there were 85.6 males.

The median household income was $29,380 and the median family income was $32,392. Males had a median income of $30,015 versus $22,215 for females. The per capita income for the city was $14,149. About 14.9% of families and 16.2% of the population were below the poverty line, including 22.8% of those under age 18 and 11.1% of those age 65 or over.

== Government ==
Current City Council membership
District	Representative	Position
1	Veronica Bandy Freeman	
2	Tracie B. Threadford	Mayor Pro Tempore
3	Cathy Anderson	
4	Deborah Matthews	
5	John "Tommy" Bryant	

Tarrant uses the mayor-council form of government. The city council consists of five members. The city is divided into five geographic districts with each one electing a council member to represent it on the city council. The election cycle for the mayor and council members is every four years during the same years as presidential elections.

The current mayor is Wayman Newton, who is in his first term. Members of the City Council are Veronica Freeman (District 1), Mayor Pro Tempore Tracie B. Threadford (District 2), Cathy Anderson (District 3), Deborah Matthews (District 4), and Tommy Bryant (District 5).

Tarrant has a new City Hall that opened in 2021 located at 1133 East Lake Boulevard, next to Kessler's Pharmacy. The previous city hall, located at 1604 Pinson Valley Parkway, has been sold to Fitzgerald Peterbilt of Birmingham, a truck dealership.

Tarrant has full-time police and fire departments. Both departments are located within the Tarrant Public Safety Building located at 2593 Commerce Circle.

== History ==
A contest was held to name the new town in 1915. Several people suggested Tarrant in honor of Benjamin Tarrant, who had lived in this community most of his life. Other sources claim the city was named for Felix I. Tarrant, President of National Cast Iron Pipe Company, which built the first major industrial plant in the area in 1912. On August 17, 1918, Tarrant became an incorporated city. Its first mayor was George Washington Thomason. The first census was taken in 1920 and gave Tarrant City a population of 734. From its incorporation until the 1980s, the community went by Tarrant City until it was shortened to Tarrant by the 1990 U.S. Census.

== Economy ==
The town is home to the ABC Coke plant owned by the Drummond Company. According to Forbes, it is "the largest single producer of foundry coke in the U.S.".

== Notable people ==
- Jimmy Bryant, singer, arranger, and composer
- James D. Martin (1918–2017), a politician and representative in the United States House of Representatives
