= Gardendale High School =

Coordinates: 33.64538°N 86.81217°W

Location
- 800 Main Street; Gardendale, Alabama 35071; United States

Information
- Type: Public
- Established: 1956 (70 years ago)
- School district: Jefferson County Board of Education
- CEEB code: 011208
- Principal: Shelton Dukes
- Teaching staff: 58.00 (FTE)
- Grades: 9-12
- Enrollment: 1,063 (2023–2024)
- Student to teacher ratio: 18.33
- Campus: Suburban
- Colors: Maroon and gray
- Athletics: AHSAA Class 6A
- Nickname: Rockets
- Rival: Mortimer Jordan High School
- Feeder schools: Bragg Middle School
- Website: www.jefcoed.com/o/gardendalehs

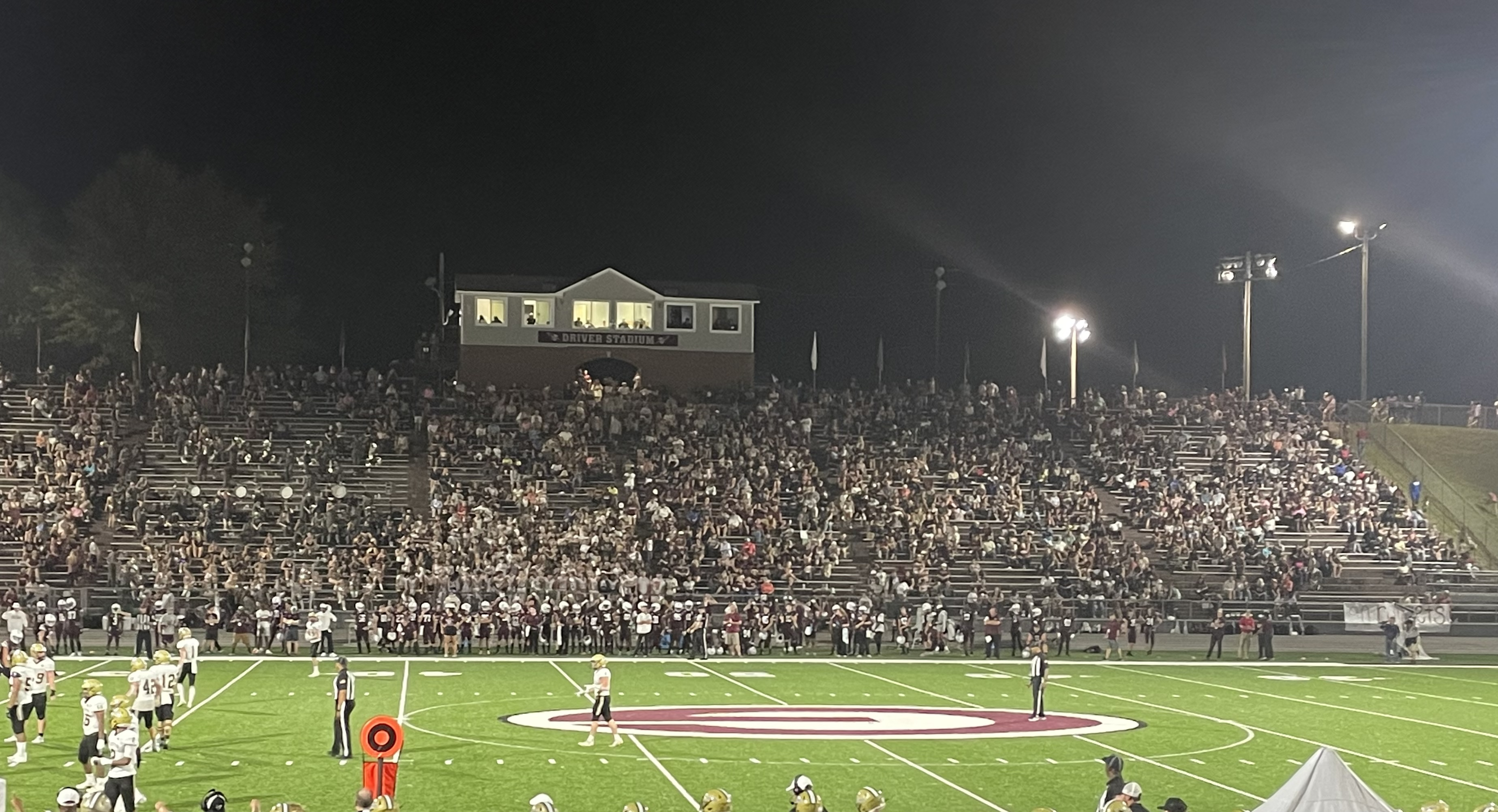
Driver Stadium on Gardendale's campus

Gardendale High School (GHS) is a public high school located in the Birmingham, Alabama suburb of Gardendale. It is currently operated by the Jefferson County Board of Education. GHS was established in 1956 as a result of population growth in the area. Until this time, local students mostly attended Mortimer Jordan High School in nearby Morris.

The school mascot/nickname is "Rockets". The name was chosen by vote of the first student body in school history and was chosen to honor the U.S. Space and Rocket program, which at the time was actively pursuing the goal of placing a man on the moon. The school colors are maroon and gray.

== Campus ==
A merger was proposed in 2007 between GHS and nearby Fultondale High School, but it was cancelled by Superintendent Phil Hammonds. In the aftermath of the scuttled merger, the district announced plans for construction of a new $46 million school building that would include separate competition and practice gyms, a 600-seat auditorium and 100-seat lecture hall, with potential future expansion to add as many as 32 additional classrooms down the road. The expansion would allow the school's 960 student enrollment to be expanded to accommodate 1,457 students. Demolition of the old school was completed in 2009.

The new high school officially opened in February 2010. Once all students had transferred to the new high school campus the Rogers campus was demolished. A new baseball stadium as well as a soccer field were built on the site of the former Rogers campus. The high school basketball teams began playing their home games in the new gymnasium in the fall of 2010.

The school's football stadium was originally called Rocket Stadium but the name was changed to Driver Stadium later to honor L.E. Driver, the man who was responsible for the stadium lighting (a former Alabama Power employee) who later became the city's parks director. During the 1970s, it was the largest capacity on-campus high school stadium in Jefferson County and second largest overall; Legion Field in Birmingham, home field of several city schools, was the largest. The stadium hosted several Dental Clinic Charity football games as well as one Crippled Children's Classic charity football game during the 1970s.

With the building of the new school facility, a new baseball park was constructed on the site of the former Rogers Building. In turn, a new softball field replaced the old baseball diamond, just across the street from Bragg Middle School. A new soccer field, which also serves as a practice field for both football and band, was built next to the new baseball park.

== Student Profile ==
Enrollment for grades 9-12 for the 2023-2024 school year is 1063. About 50.2% of students are male, and about 49.8% are female. Approximately 58.4% of students are white, 29.4% are African-American, 8.1% are Hispanic, and 4.1% are other races/ethnicities. Roughly 47.8% of students qualify for free or reduced-price lunch. The average graduation rate for Gardendale High School is 89%. Approximately 19% of its students meet or exceed proficiency standards in mathematics, while 26% meet or exceed proficiency standards in reading. The average ACT score for GHS students is 22 and the average SAT composite is 1070.

== Recognition ==
Gardendale High School's program was recognized by the Alabama Department of Education as recipient of the "Outstanding Program of the Year Award" in 2003 for its Family and Consumer Sciences Education Program and the integrated efforts of the school's chapter of the Family, Career, and Community Leaders of America (FCCLA).

== Athletics ==
=== Classification ===
Until the mid-1980s, the Alabama High School Athletic Association maintained a four classification system for high school athletics in Alabama. Since then, the AHSAA has maintained a six classification system, and has now moved to seven classes. Gardendale High was mostly a 3A school (but did participate at class 4A for two years) in the four-class system. Since the advent of the six-class system, most years Gardendale High was a 5A participant, but has spent time in the 6A classification. The classification system is based on enrollment grades 9-12 and is re-evaluated every two years. As of the 2023–24 school year, Gardendale is classified as a 6A school.

=== Track & Field ===
Gardendale High School has achieved the highest success in track and field. The boys' indoor track team has won the Alabama state indoor track championship, winning titles in 1978 (Class 1A/2A/3A), 1979 (Class 3A), 1980 (Class 3A), 1984 (Class 3A), 1988 (Class 4A/5A) and 1989 (Class 6A). In 1980, The Gardendale Girls Indoor Track team won the one and only state championship for girls' sports in the school's long history. The boys' cross-country team has won the state Class 3A championship five times, including four consecutive years from 1976 through 1979, and again in 1982. Gardendale has also had success in the regular outdoor season winning state championships in 1979 and 1984 for 3A. Another state title followed in 1989 for Class 6A.

Keith Clay, a track athlete in the late 1970s, holds the GHS record for the most individual state championships in any sport with a total of 8. Meanwhile, Micah McAnnally, from the mid-1980s, claimed 7 individual state championships in track and field for 2nd most. Troy Henderson from the 1990’s, won 6 individual state championships for 3rd most in GHS athletic history.

=== Wrestling ===
- Gardendale's first state championship in any sport was in wrestling in 1974. Since then they have won tournament state championships in 1975, 2020, and 2021. In 2020 and 2021 they also added state championships in the dual format. The school has produced multiple wrestling state champions. Steve Mordecai was a four-time state champion from 1974 to 1977. Tripp Otis was named Most Outstanding Wrestler in Class 5A for 2007, and completed his senior season by winning the Class 5A state championship in the 189-pound weight class, losing only one match all season long. Fellow wrestler Chad Bearden won the 2007 Class 5A heavyweight championship, winning the Class 5A state championship for the third time in his career.

=== State Championship Teams ===
Gardendale High School has won 19 state athletics championships:

- Boys' Cross Country: 1976, 1977, 1978, 1979, 1982
- Boys' Indoor Track: 1978, 1979, 1980, 1984, 1988, 1989
- Girls' Indoor Track: 1980
- Boys' Outdoor Track & Field: 1979, 1984, 1989
- Wrestling: Tournament in 1974, 1975, 2020, 2021.

=== Cheerleading ===
- Gardendale High School has won a multitude of Jefferson County Competitions.
- UCA Spirit Award 2006, 2007, 2008, 2009, 2010, 2011, 2012, 2013, 2014, 2015, 2016

== Notable alumni ==
- Curt Jarvis – 1983 graduate, University of Alabama football (1983–1986), Tampa Bay Buccaneers 1987
- Kevin Drake – 1993 graduate, University of Alabama at Birmingham football (1991–1993), NFL's Arizona Cardinals, Buffalo Bills, Denver Broncos, Dallas Cowboys 1998–2001
- Alan Ogg – former UAB and NBA basketball player
- Willie Wyatt – 1986 graduate, University of Alabama football (1986–1989), Tampa Bay Buccaneers 1990
- Pat Keedy – former MLB player (California Angels, Chicago White Sox, Cleveland Indians)
- Jerry Hairston Sr. – 1971 graduate, former Major League Baseball player, most notably with Chicago White Sox
- Jordan Howard – running back for UAB (2013–2014) and Indiana University football (2015) and former NFL player
- Trey Mullinax – golfer on Alabama Crimson Tide golf team that won 2013 and 2014 NCAA Men's Golf Championships, now on PGA Tour
