= Alabama State Fair Montgomery =

Annual event in Alabama, United States

- Frequency: annually (with breaks)
- Locations: Montgomery, Montgomery County, Alabama, U.S.
- Years active: 1855–1861; c. 1906–?
- Established: November 20–24, 1855

The Alabama State Fair Montgomery is a state fair established in 1855 in Montgomery, Alabama, U.S.. The first event was named the Agricultural Fair and Cattle Show, and in later history the event went by the name, Alabama State Exposition.

== History ==
The Cotton Planters' Conventions and agricultural fairs were formed in Alabama, prior to the establishment of state fairs. The first fair was held November 20–24, 1855 and named the "Agricultural Fair and Cattle Show". Noah Bartlett Cloud, the editor of Cotton Planter magazine (later known as The American Cotton Planter and Soil of the South) publicized the first Alabama State Fair Montgomery. The fair was held every year for 5 years, but in 1861 after the American Civil War began it paused the fair.

By the turn of the 20th-century, the Alabama State Fair was held at a fairground, just north of the city of Montgomery.

=== 1906 Alabama State Fair Montgomery ===
By the 1906 Alabama State Fair in Montgomery, the Alabama Agricultural Association started encouraging African American entries and invited "Negros of the state" to join. They were encouraged to build a "Negro Building," focused on displaying the "educational, moral, and industrial life of Negros". The "Negro Building" was an L-shaped structure designed by architect Walter Thomas Bailey of Tuskegee Institute (now Tuskegee University) under the direction of Booker T. Washington. October 27, 1906, was designated as "Negro Day," with entertainment programing including a speech by Washington, a horse race, and a parade. Some one thousand White people also visited the Negro Building, before the building was removed after the end of the fair.

== See also ==
- Garrett Coliseum
