= Mortimer Jordan High School =

Coordinates: 33.75817°N 86.81126°W

Location
- 1920 Blue Devil Drive; Kimberly, Alabama 35091; United States

Information
- Type: Public
- Motto: "Love it...or leave it."
- Established: 1920 (106 years ago)
- School board: Jefferson County Board of Education
- CEEB code: 011925
- NCES School ID: 010192000728
- Principal: Rodney Ragland
- Teaching staff: 48.80 (FTE)
- Grades: 9-12
- Enrollment: 886 (2024–2025)
- Student to teacher ratio: 18.16
- Campus: Suburban
- Colors: Blue and white
- Slogan: "It's a great day to be a Blue Devil!"
- Fight song: "Roll Jordan Roll"
- Athletics: AHSAA Class 6A
- Mascot: MoJo
- Nickname: Blue Devils
- Rival: Gardendale High School
- Yearbook: Torch
- Feeder schools: North Jefferson Middle School
- Website: www.jefcoed.com/o/mortimerjordanhs

Mortimer Jordan High School (MJHS, MJ, MOJO, or Jordan) is a public high school located in Kimberly, Alabama. It is a part of the Jefferson County Board of Education.

The school was named after Captain Mortimer Harvie Jordan, a war hero who lost his life in World War I. He was a soldier, officer and physician. As commanding officer of Company K, 167th infantry, 42nd "Rainbow Division" Alabama Army National Guard, he was mortally wounded while leading his sector in battle. He died of his wounds in 1918 and is buried in Arlington National Cemetery.

== Student profile ==
Enrollment in grades 9-12 for the 2024-2025 school year is 886 students. About 52% of students are male, 48% are female. Approximately 80.5% of students are White, 11.1% are African-American, 4.7% are Hispanic, and 3.7% are other races/ethnicities. Roughly 35% of students qualify for free or reduced price lunch.

As of 2025, MJHS has a graduation rate of 92%. Approximately 27% of its students meet or exceed proficiency standards in mathematics, while 27% meet or exceed standards in reading. The average ACT score for MJHS students is 23 and the average SAT composite is 1080.

== History ==
=== Early years ===
Mortimer Jordan High School opened in the fall of 1920 at its original campus in Morris, Alabama. Ninety students were enrolled at the start of the year, and the first graduating class consisted of Sudie Counts and Eileen Jenkins, both of whom became teachers. The first principal, Ms. Minnie Holliman, and three female teachers completed the faculty. Twelve students graduated in the second full year of classes. In 1928, Mabel Creel, a student, graduated valedictorian at the age of 13. She was the youngest to graduate with such high honors.

=== Improvements ===
The original facility was located in Morris, with the property directly adjacent to the city limits of Kimberly. This site was occupied until the end of the 2010–11 school year. The original building of five rooms soon became inadequate and a frame building of eight rooms was added. The first water system for the school was installed during the early 1930s. Alabama By-Product Corporation in Majestic donated the pump and water filter to the school using Turkey Creek as the water source. A teacher and some students installed the system, and water fountains were placed outside the building. Between the years of 1937 and 1941 indoor plumbing and restrooms were installed. The "old gym" was built by the WPA during 1936 and 1937, around the same time the lunchroom program was established. The first Miss Mortimer Jordan, now Miss Torch, was elected in 1937. Stage curtains were purchased for the gym stage with the proceeds from the pageant.

During the early 1950s, a then up-to-date football and athletic field was constructed. Restrooms in the football stadium were added in 1962. During the 1960s, Gardendale High School was established south of Morris in Gardendale. Until that time, students in the Gardendale area attended Mortimer Jordan High School. Gardendale based students were phased out in the mid-to-late 1960s. MJ senior high school students from Gardendale were allowed to finish senior high school at Mortimer Jordan if they desired or could transfer to Gardendale. Many chose to finish at MJ. Buses to MJ ran routes through Gardendale for several years concurrent with buses to Gardendale until the phase out was completed in 1968–69.

In its last incarnation at the Morris site, the school consisted of a multi-complex that included two gymnasiums, academic classrooms, and a lunchroom. A music department (band and choir), homemaking department, business education department, and student counseling service were added. A brand-new Mortimer Jordan High School was built on Bone Dry Road, approximately four miles from the old site. It opened in the fall of 2011. The new site, one of a series of new high schools built during the period by the Jefferson County Schools, consists of classroom buildings, an athletics field house, and two fields for football, baseball and softball. A competition and a practice gymnasium, as well as greatly enlarged practice facilities for wrestling, are also included.

The original site in Morris was converted into the William E. Burkett Center for handicapped students; the W.E.B.C. moved from its original location near Fultondale to the original MJHS campus at the beginning of the 2012–13 school year.

=== Principals ===
The following is an up-to-date list of principals at Mortimer Jordan High School, from 1920 to present;

Principal	Tenure
Minnie Holliman	1920-1921
T.J. Jordan	1921-1922
J.H. Sams	1922-1924
Gordon G. Ford	1924-1925
J.W. Vann	1925-1939
Jewell Hall	1939-1941
George Dewey Harris	1941-1953
J.O. Suddeth	1953-1965
William E. Burkett	1965-1968
Jimmie A. Trotter	1968-2000
Byron Campbell	2000-2009
Barbara Snider	2009-2014
Craig Kanaday	2014-2024
Rodney Ragland	2024–Present

Since its establishment, Mortimer Jordan High School has had fourteen principals. Rodney Ragland is the current principal of MJHS.

== Athletics ==
The Mortimer Jordan High School athletic department fields teams in basketball, baseball, bowling, cross country, indoor track, outdoor track, football, softball, volleyball, wrestling, tennis, golf, and soccer. MJHS competes in Class 6A of Alabama High School Athletic Association (AHSAA). MJ Athletics has traditional rivalries with Corner and Gardendale High Schools. MJHS holds state titles in three different AHSAA sports (2 boys, 1 girls). Mortimer Jordan High School currently holds six team state championship titles (2 boys, 4 girls).

=== Football ===
The Mortimer Jordan High School football team competes in Class 6A of AHSAA. The team was first organized in 1922 and has an all-time record of 429–520–31. The team is coached by Dustan Goode who holds an 80–41 record. Goode has led the Blue Devils to eight playoff appearances, the most in school history for head football coaches. The longest-serving head football coach in school history was Greg Watts. Watts served from 1999 to 2012 and compiled a record of 79–71. MJ has long-running football rivalries with Corner and Gardendale High Schools, leading the series 45–20 over Corner High and trailing 8–30 to Gardendale. Jordan currently holds six region championships in 1984, 1995, 2016, 2017, 2018, and 2019. Jordan reached its first playoff appearance in 1973 and secured its first playoff win in 1984. Since, MJHS has had 21 playoff appearances. The football program was the 5A runner-up in 2015, playing in its first AHSAA Super 7 appearance at Bryant-Denny Stadium.

=== Boys Basketball ===
Mortimer Jordan's boys basketball team competes in Class 6A of AHSAA. The Mortimer Jordan basketball team was first organized in 1921. The longest-serving head boys basketball coach in school history is Josh Golden. Golden has served from 2017–present and holds a 95–109 record. Jordan's basketball team holds eight area championships in 1984, 1987, 1988, 2012, 2013, 2015, 2016, and 2017. MJ boys basketball holds three district championships in 1932, 1938, and 1944. The team reached its first playoff in 1922. Since, the Blue Devils have had eight state tournament appearances, making it to the Elite 8 playoff round in 1929 and 1944. The Mortimer Jordan High basketball program gained its first AHSAA state championship title in 1928.

=== Baseball ===
Mortimer Jordan's baseball team competes in Class 6A of AHSAA. The longest-serving head baseball coach in school history is Shayne Carnes. Carnes has served from 2007–present and holds a 482–260 record. Jordan's baseball team holds 15 area championships in 1985, 1995, 1998, 2002, 2003, 2007, 2008, 2013, 2014, 2015, 2016, 2018, 2022, 2023, and 2024. MJHS baseball reached its first playoff in 1975. Since, the Blue Devils have had 29 playoff appearances, making it to the Elite 8 in 2001 and 2003 and the Final Four in 1984, 2002, and 2018.

=== Wrestling ===
Mortimer Jordan's wrestling team competes in Class 6A of AHSAA. Jordan's wrestling team has had many individual titles including four-time state champions Brandon Brindley (2009–12) and Brodie Christmas (2021–24). The team has two runner-up finishes in the Duals State Tournament in 2023 and 2024. The wrestling program won its first AHSAA state championship with the 2022 5A-6A title. The team also has one runner-up finish in 2024.

=== Boys Tennis ===
Mortimer Jordan's boys tennis team competes in Class 6A of AHSAA. The tennis team was first organized in 2016. MJHS boys tennis holds seven county championships in 2016, 2017, 2019, 2021, 2022, 2023, and 2024. The team has won two sectional championships in 2016 and 2022. Jordan boys tennis has had four team state tournament appearances in 2016, 2021, 2022, and 2024.

=== Softball ===
Mortimer Jordan's softball team competes in Class 6A of AHSAA. The team is coached by Shawn Maze who holds a 189-158-6 record. Jordan's softball team currently holds 11 area championships in 2000, 2004, 2008, 2010, 2011, 2012, 2017, 2021, 2022, 2023, and 2024. MJHS softball reached its first playoff in 1995. Since, the Blue Devils have had numerous playoff appearances, making it to the Elite 8 in 2005, 2006, 2018, and 2022 and the Final Four in 1996, 1997, 2003, 2004, 2007, 2013, 2019, and 2021. The softball team won the Alabama High School Athletic Association Class 5A State Championship in 2008 and 2009, setting a state record in 2009 for most consecutive games won. That streak carried over into the 2010 season, and ended at 59 games when Jordan lost to Angelo Rodriguez High School of Fairfield, California in the ESPN RISE/Nike Fastest to First Tournament in Huntington Beach, California on March 25, 2010. (The team later finished second in the 2010 5A championship, upset by Athens High twice on the final day.) Jordan also won the 2011 championship, only the fourth team in state history to win a title after losing their opening game in the double-elimination tournament. The softball program won its first state championship with the 1999 4A-5A title. The team currently holds four AHSAA state championships in 1999, 2008, 2009, and 2011. It also has five runner-up finishes in 1998, 2000, 2006, 2010, and 2012.

=== Girls Basketball ===
Mortimer Jordan's girls basketball team competes in Class 6A of AHSAA. The longest-serving head girls basketball coach in school history is Kelly Robinson. Robinson has served from 2017–present and holds a 154–56 record. Jordan's girls basketball currently holds eight area championships in 2004, 2008, 2017, 2019, 2020, 2021, 2022, and 2025. The team has had numerous playoff appearances, making it to the Elite 8 round in 2017 and 2022.

=== Volleyball ===
Mortimer Jordan's volleyball team competes in Class 6A of AHSAA. The volleyball team was first organized in 1976. The MJHS volleyball team holds two area championships in 2017 and 2023.

=== Girls Soccer ===
Mortimer Jordan's girls soccer competes in Class 6A of AHSAA. The girls soccer team was first organized in 2015. MJ girls soccer holds three area championships in 2021, 2023, and 2024. The team has had eight playoff appearances in 2016, 2017, 2018, 2019, 2021, 2022, 2023, and 2024. The team reached the Elite 8 round in 2024.

=== Girls Tennis ===
Mortimer Jordan's girls tennis team competes in Class 6A of AHSAA. Jordan's girls tennis team was first organized in 2016. MJHS girls' tennis holds two county championships in 2018 and 2019. The team has had one state tournament appearance in 2022.

Mortimer Jordan High School is accredited by the Southern Association of Colleges and Schools and the Alabama Department of Education.

== Notable alumni ==
- Spencer Brown, American football running back
- Pat Buttram, actor
- Lum Harris, Major League Baseball player and coach
- Devlin Hodges, professional quarterback
- Haylie McCleney, U.S. softball Olympic silver medalist
- Peter Tom Willis, professional football player
