= Laddie J. Williams =

American politician

Alabama House of Representatives
- In office 1873–1874

Personal details
- Born: 1844
- Died: June 1874 (aged 29–30)

Lazarus "Laddie" J. Williams, sometimes spelled "Latty", (1844 – June 1874) was a registrar in 1866 and served in the Alabama House of Representatives during the Reconstruction era in Alabama. He was also a Montgomery city council member for three terms from 1869 to 1874. He and Jeremiah Haralson were both African Americans who represented Montgomery County, Alabama. Williams pushed for civil rights legislation. He headed a special committee that was able to arrange for a conference of conservatives to proceed peacefully. He served in 1873 along with Noah B. Cloud representing Montgomery.

He was a Union League organizer, an officer in the Alabama Labor Union, and belonged to the first Baptist Church in Montgomery serving an African American congregation.

In 1873 Williams and Lewis E. Parsons were arrested and charged with conspiracy to prevent members of the legislature from voting for United States Senator. The United States district court dismissed the charges in July 1874 due to no evidence, a month after Williams' death.

He died of Bright's disease in June 1874.

== See also ==
- African American officeholders from the end of the Civil War until before 1900
