= AIAA (disambiguation) =

AIAA is an initialism that most commonly refers to the American Institute of Aeronautics and Astronautics.

AIAA may also refer to:

- Alabama Interscholastic Athletic Association, a former governing body for African-American high school athletics in Alabama
- Atlantic Intercollegiate Athletic Association, a university-level athletic association in Atlantic Canada, merged into Atlantic University Sport
