= Peter Tom Willis =

American football player (born 1967)

No. 10, 2, 4, 11
- Position: Quarterback

Personal information
- Born: January 4, 1967 (age 59); Morris, Alabama, U.S.
- Listed height: 6 ft 2 in (1.88 m)
- Listed weight: 188 lb (85 kg)

Career information
- High school: Mortimer Jordan (Kimberly, Alabama)
- College: Florida State
- NFL draft: 1990: 3rd round, 63rd overall pick

Career history
- Chicago Bears (1990–1993); Tampa Bay Buccaneers (1995)*; Tampa Bay Storm (1997–1999)
- * Offseason or practice squad member only

Awards and highlights
- Second-team All-Arena (1998); First-team All-South Independent (1989)

Career NFL statistics
- Passing attempts: 183
- Passing completions: 104
- Completion percentage: 56.8%
- TD–INT: 6–15
- Passing yards: 1,261
- Passer rating: 54.9
- Stats at Pro Football Reference

Career AFL statistics
- Comp. / Att.: 718 / 1,255
- Passing yards: 9,490
- TD-INT: 176–37
- Passer rating: 104.04
- Stats at ArenaFan.com

Peter Tom Willis (born January 4, 1967) is an American former professional football player who was a quarterback in the National Football League (NFL) and Arena Football League (AFL). He played college football for the Florida State Seminoles and was selected by the Chicago Bears in the third round of the 1990 NFL draft. After four years with the Bears, he played in the AFL for the Tampa Bay Storm. From 1998 to 2008 he served as the radio color commentator for the Seminoles.

Willis lives in Valrico, Florida and is an industrial buyer for Commercial Metals Company at their Tampa facility.

== College career ==
Originally from Morris, Alabama and Mortimer Jordan High School, Willis was inducted as a member of the Florida State University Sports Hall of Fame in 1998. During his successful senior year in 1989 (his first and only season as the starting quarterback), he led the team to 10 straight victories, including an impressive 41–17 win over the Nebraska Cornhuskers in the Fiesta Bowl. It was also during that year that he set 15 team passing records. He surpassed fellow Seminole Hall of Famer Gary Huff to become Florida State's top single season passer with 3,124 yards. He also set the record for passes completed in a season (211), most 300-yard passing games (six), as well as touchdown passes in a game (six). Willis also set five Florida State career records including best passing efficiency at 148.5.

Willis' senior season saw the Seminoles lose their first two games before coming back with 10-straight wins over the likes of Syracuse, Auburn, Miami and Florida. On a team that many considered the nation's best at year's end, Willis helped put the exclamation point on that notion with a 41–17 win over Nebraska in the Fiesta Bowl.

== College statistics ==
Legend
	Led the conference
**Bold**	Career high

=== Regular season ===
Year	Team	Games	Passing							
Year	Team	GP	Cmp	Att	Pct	Yds	Y/A	TD	Int	Rtg
1986	Florida State	8	36	59	61.0	463	7.8	3	4	130.2
1987	Florida State	4	9	10	**90.0**	67	6.7	1	0	**179.3**
1988	Florida State	**11**	48	85	56.5	637	7.5	9	3	147.3
1989	Florida State	**11**	**211**	**346**	61.0	**3,124**	**9.0**	**20**	**9**	150.7
Career		34	304	500	60.8	4,291	8.6	33	16	148.3

== Professional career ==
After college, Willis played professional football for the National Football League's Chicago Bears and the Tampa Bay Storm of the Arena Football League.

== Commentating career ==
Willis worked in the broadcast booth as a color analyst with "the voice of the Seminoles", long time FSU play-by-play announcer Gene Deckerhoff. His signature was to praise a player's performance by saying "I see you, (name of player)!" Following ten years of service, his contract was not renewed after the 2007–2008 football season because the Florida State administration and coaches felt he was "too critical" of the program. Head coach Bobby Bowden stood by this decision, and said "I do support it. I support it all the way."

"They felt like I was too critical of the program and the team the last few years," Willis said. "I hate that. That was not my intent. My intent was to call it like I see it for 10 years. But if people are upset with me because I was telling the truth, if that's going to upset people, maybe I shouldn't be there."

Willis is a member of the FSU Sports Hall of Fame and a former quarterback who led the Seminoles to a 10–2 record and No. 3 ranking in 1989. He was critical of the offense under former coordinator Jeff Bowden, and regretted saying that the Seminoles resembled a "high school offense" during the 2005 game at Clemson. That comment especially upset coach Bobby Bowden, according to sources. Willis believed that the program, with the hiring of Jimbo Fisher, was headed in the right direction.
