= Corner, Alabama =

Unincorporated community in Alabama, United States

- Unincorporated community
- Location within Alabama Location within the United States
- Coordinates: 33°48′01″N 86°56′32″W
- Country: United States
- State: Alabama
- County: Jefferson
- Elevation: 722 ft (220 m)
- Time zone: UTC-6 (Central (CST))
  - Summer (DST): UTC-5 (CDT)
- Area codes: 205, 659
- GNIS feature ID: 116654

Corner is an unincorporated community in Jefferson County, Alabama, United States.

== Geography ==
Corner is located in Jefferson County at the intersection of Jefferson County, Walker County, and Blount County, hence the name. The community is about 6 miles west of Warrior. Much of it lies upon York Mountain, and as far away as Birmingham may be seen on clear days. Residents of Corner carry either Dora (648) or Warrior (647, 590) telephone prefixes and Dora, Warrior, or Empire ZIP codes. Territory is often defined by school zone, and the exact boundary is unclear between Corner and neighboring communities such as Bagley. Corner High School, with an enrollment of about 1,000 in grades K-12, is the area's focal point.

== Schools ==
Corner Middle School is located at the intersection of Bagley (Mayfield) Road and Corner School Road. Corner High School, previously located at the same site as the middle school, moved in 2010 to a new facility three miles (5 km) to the west on Warrior-Jasper Road. The school competes in Class 4A of the Alabama High School Athletic Association. The mascot is the yellow jacket. Their rivals are the Dora Bulldogs and the Hayden Wildcats.

Coach Trent Campbell is the head football coach at Corner. It has an award-winning marching band, led by director Adam Murphy and assistant director Debra Saunders. The band participated in the BOA Grand Nationals Championships during November 11–14, 2009 in Indianapolis, Indiana (led by Rick Coggin). It is also home to a notable theatre troupe. Corner High School has Track & Field, Tennis, Volleyball, Golf, Bowling, Cross Country, Basketball, Baseball, Softball and last but certainly not least a Football Team. Corner High School has had a lot of success in its athletic programs throughout the years.

Most notably, Corner High School won the 2024 AHSAA 4A Baseball State Championship and secured the school's first state championship in 70 years, and the first in baseball. They ended the season with a 33-8 record, and numerous awards and accolades were attributed to the players and coaches. Some of these include multiple nominations to First-Team and Second-Team All State, 4A Coach of the Year, and 4A Pitcher of the Year.
