= 1946 Alabama Superintendent of Education election =

- November 5, 1946
Candidate	A. R. Meadows	Fred Allen
Party	Democratic	Republican
Popular vote	163,708	22,909
Percentage	87.7%	12.3%
Superintendent before election
A. R. Meadows
Democratic
Elected Superintendent
A. R. Meadows
Democratic

The 1946 Alabama Superintendent of Education election was held on November 5, 1946, to elect the Alabama Superintendent of Education to a four-year term. Primary elections were held on May 7.

== Democratic primary ==
Superintendent Elbert B. Norton announced his resignation date as July 1. Clifton Pannell was chosen as the appointee to the position by governor Chauncey Sparks, but Pannell died in May, prior to taking office. A special primary election was scheduled for July 30, which A. R. Meadows, who was appointed to the position the same month, was unopposed for the nomination.

=== Candidates ===
==== Nominee ====
- A. R. Meadows, incumbent superintendent (appointed following the death of Pannell)

==== Died after nomination ====
- Clifton Pannell, appointed superintendent (never took office)

=== Results ===
Democratic primary
Party	Candidate	Votes	%
Democratic	Clifton Pannell	203,066	100.00
Total votes		203,066	100.00

== Republican convention ==
=== Candidates ===
==== Nominee ====
- Fred Allen

== General election ==
=== Results ===
1946 Alabama Superintendent of Education election
Party	Candidate	Votes	%
Democratic	A. R. Meadows (incumbent)	163,708	87.72
Republican	Fred Allen	22,909	12.28
Total votes		186,617	100.00
