= 1902 Alabama Superintendent of Education election =

- November 4, 1902
Candidate	Isaac W. Hill	J. C. Fonville
Party	Democratic	Republican
Popular vote	64,891	22,310
Percentage	74.4%	25.6%
state superintendent of education before election
Democratic
Elected state superintendent of education
Isaac W. Hill
Democratic

The 1902 Alabama Superintendent of Education election was held on November 4, 1902, to elect the Alabama Superintendent of Education to a four-year term. Democratic nominee Isaac W. Hill was elected.

== Nominees ==
- Buel Andrus (Socialist, write-in)
- J. C. Fonville (Republican)
- Isaac W. Hill (Democratic)
- O. E. Comstock (Prohibition, write-in)
- C. J. Hammett (Prohibition, write-in)

== Results ==
1902 Alabama Superintendent of Education election
Party	Candidate	Votes	%
Democratic	Isaac W. Hill	64,891	74.36
Republican	J. C. Fonville	22,310	25.57
Socialist	Buel Andrus (write-in)	54	0.06
Prohibition	O. E. Comstock (write-in)	11	0.01
Prohibition	C. J. Hammett (write-in)	1	0.00
Total votes		87,267	100.00
