= Devlin Hodges =

American football player (born 1996)

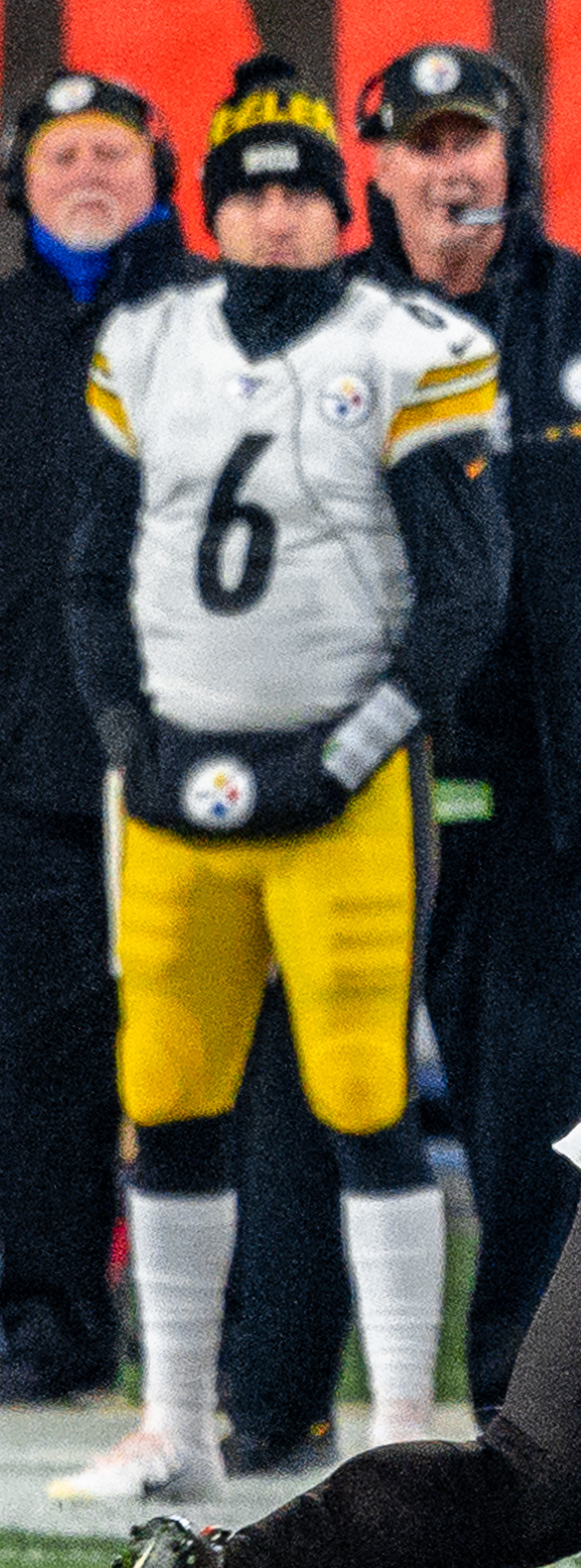
- Hodges with the Pittsburgh Steelers in 2019

No. 6, 19, 7
- Position: Quarterback

Personal information
- Born: April 12, 1996 (age 30); Kimberly, Alabama, U.S.
- Listed height: 6 ft 1 in (1.85 m)
- Listed weight: 210 lb (95 kg)

Career information
- High school: Mortimer Jordan (Kimberly)
- College: Samford (2014–2018)
- NFL draft: 2019: undrafted

Career history
- Pittsburgh Steelers (2019–2020); Los Angeles Rams (2021)*; Ottawa Redblacks (2021)
- * Offseason or practice squad member only

Awards and highlights
- Walter Payton Award (2018); NCAA FCS career passing yards leader (14,584); 3× SoCon Offensive Player of the Year (2016–18); 3× First-team All-SoCon (2016–18)

Career NFL statistics
- Passing attempts: 160
- Passing completions: 100
- Completion percentage: 62.5%
- TD–INT: 5–8
- Passing yards: 1,063
- Passer rating: 71.4
- Stats at Pro Football Reference
- Stats at CFL.ca

Devlin Patrick Hodges (born April 12, 1996), nicknamed "Duck", is an American former professional football player who was a quarterback in the National Football League (NFL) and Canadian Football League (CFL). He played college football for the Samford Bulldogs, after playing at Mortimer Jordan High School. He was signed by the Pittsburgh Steelers as an undrafted free agent in 2019. He was also a member of the Los Angeles Rams and Ottawa Redblacks.

== College career ==
Hodges was a four-year starter at quarterback for Samford. He was named the Southern Conference Offensive Player of the Year three times, and he was the recipient of the 2018 Walter Payton Award during his senior year in which he set the NCAA Football Championship Subdivision career record for passing yards (14,584), completions (1,310) and attempts (1,896). Hodges’ marks broke the previous records that were set by former Alcorn State quarterback Steve McNair in 1994.

== Professional career ==
Pre-draft measurables
Height	Weight	Arm length	Hand span	Wingspan	40-yard dash	10-yard split	20-yard split	20-yard shuttle	Three-cone drill	Vertical jump	Broad jump
6 ft 0 3/8 in (1.84 m)	212 lb (96 kg)	30 1/8 in (0.77 m)	9 1/4 in (0.23 m)	6 ft 0 3/4 in (1.85 m)	4.79 s	1.69 s	2.77 s	4.53 s	7.38 s	32.0 in (0.81 m)	8 ft 7 in (2.62 m)
All values from Pro Day

=== Pittsburgh Steelers ===
==== 2019 season ====
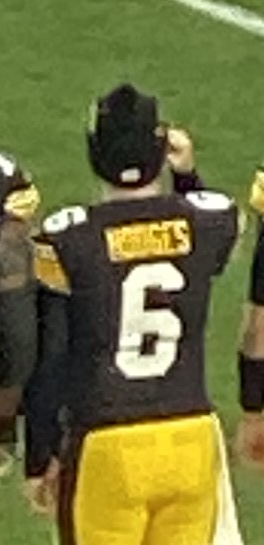
Hodges in 2019

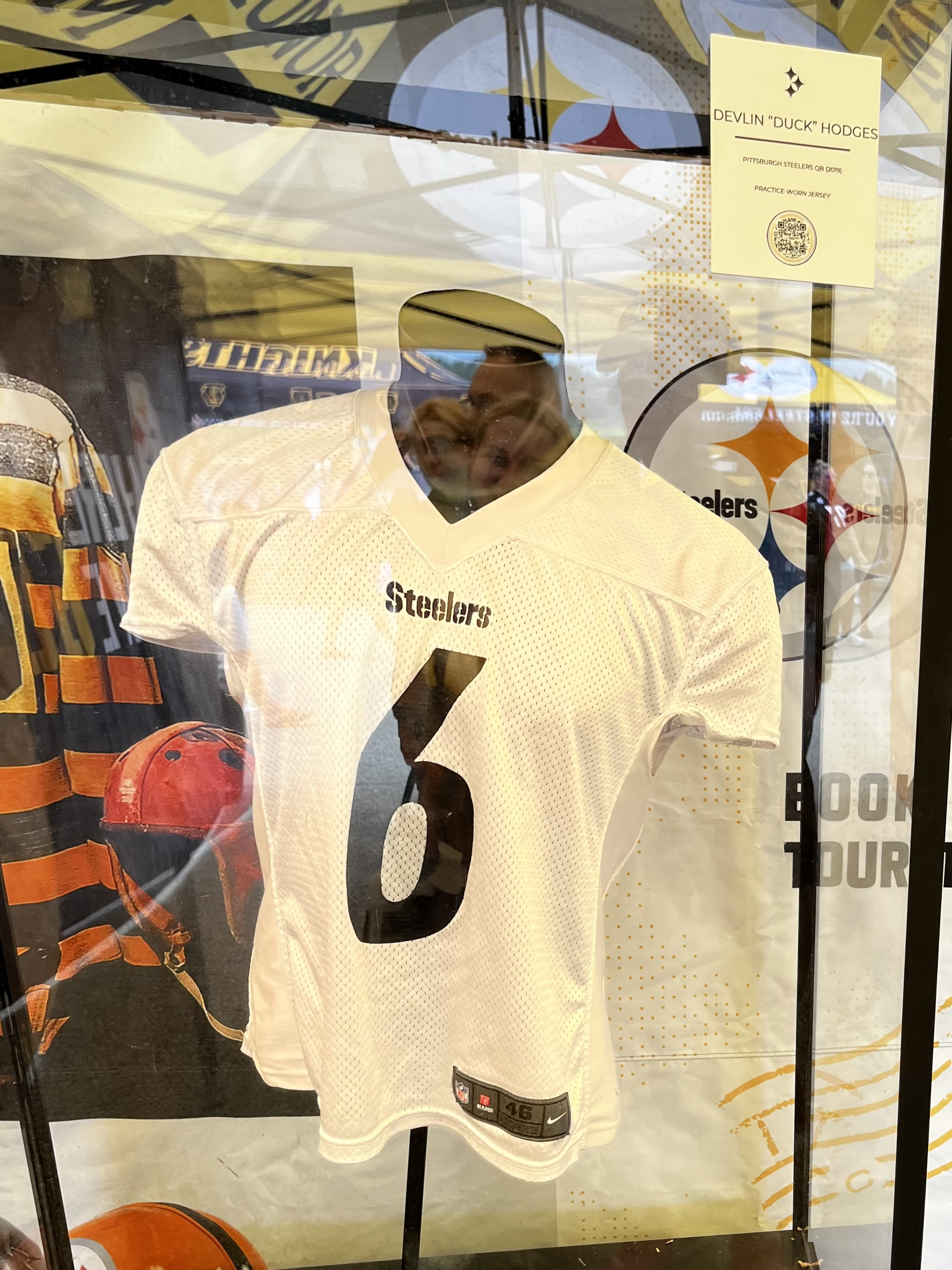
Hodges's number 6 jersey on display at Steelers training camp 2024

Hodges signed with the Pittsburgh Steelers as an undrafted free agent on May 13, 2019. He was waived on August 31, 2019. The Steelers re-signed Hodges to their practice squad on September 10, 2019. He was promoted to the active roster on September 16, 2019, following an injury to starter Ben Roethlisberger.

On October 6, 2019, he made his professional debut with the Steelers in a game against the Baltimore Ravens following an injury to Mason Rudolph. In his first regular season game, Hodges completed seven of nine passes for 68 yards, and ran the ball twice for 20 yards. He won his first NFL start in the October 13, 2019, game against the Los Angeles Chargers. In the game, Hodges threw for 132 yards, one touchdown, and one interception. On November 24, 2019, Hodges replaced Rudolph midway through the third quarter and threw for 118 yards which included a 79-yard touchdown pass en route to a 16–10 comeback victory over the Cincinnati Bengals. On November 26, Steelers' head coach Mike Tomlin named Hodges the starting quarterback for the Steelers' next game against the Cleveland Browns. In the game, Hodges threw for 212 yards, one touchdown, and one interception in the 20–13 win. After another win over the Arizona Cardinals, Hodges struggled against the Buffalo Bills on Sunday Night Football on December 15, 2019, throwing for 202 yards, 1 touchdown, and a career-high 4 interceptions as the Steelers lost, 17–10.

In Week 16 against the New York Jets, Hodges was benched early in the second quarter for Rudolph after throwing two interceptions. He was put back into the game in the fourth quarter after Rudolph suffered a shoulder injury. The Steelers lost, 16–10. In total, Hodges threw for 84 yards and two interceptions during the loss. Hodges appeared in eight games as a rookie and totaled 1,063 passing yards, five touchdowns, and eight interceptions.

==== 2020 season ====
Hodges was waived by the Steelers on September 6, 2020, and was signed to the practice squad the next day. His practice squad contract with the team expired after the season on January 18, 2021.

=== Los Angeles Rams ===
On January 25, 2021, Hodges signed a reserve/future contract with the Los Angeles Rams. He was waived by Los Angeles on August 23.

=== Ottawa Redblacks ===
On September 16, 2021, Hodges signed a three-year contract with the Ottawa Redblacks of the Canadian Football League. On November 5, the Redblacks announced that Hodges would be the team's starting quarterback for their November 6 game against the Toronto Argonauts. Hodges struggled in his debut, completing only eight passes on 22 attempts for 90 passing yards as the Redblacks lost to the Argonauts 23–20. He finished the season having played in four games, completing 16 of 38 pass attempts with one interception. He also carried the ball nine times for 38 yards. On April 22, 2022, the Redblacks announced that Hodges had retired from professional football.

== Career statistics ==
=== NFL ===
Year	Team	Games			Passing									Rushing					Sacks		Fumbles	
Year	Team	GP	GS	Record	Cmp	Att	Pct	Yds	Avg	Lng	TD	Int	Rtg	Att	Yds	Avg	Lng	TD	Sck	SckY	Fum	Lost
2019	PIT	8	6	3–3	100	160	62.5	1,063	6.6	79	5	8	71.4	21	68	3.2	22	0	15	102	5	1
Career		8	6	3–3	100	160	62.5	1,063	6.6	79	5	8	71.4	21	68	3.2	22	0	15	102	5	1

=== College ===
Legend
	FCS record
**Bold**	Career high

Season	Team	Games			Passing								Rushing			
Season	Team	GP	GS	Record	Cmp	Att	Pct	Yds	Y/A	TD	Int	Rtg	Att	Yds	Avg	TD
2014	Samford	0	0	—	Redshirted (redshirt)											
2015	Samford	9	5	3–2	200	288	69.4	2,230	7.7	12	6	144.1	74	**327**	**4.4**	2
2016	Samford	**12**	**12**	7–5	375	530	**70.8**	4,088	7.7	**36**	8	**154.9**	**111**	222	2.0	4
2017	Samford	**12**	**12**	**8–4**	347	528	65.7	3,983	7.5	31	11	144.3	95	155	1.6	3
2018	Samford	11	11	6–5	**388**	**550**	70.5	**4,283**	**7.8**	32	**16**	149.3	90	313	3.5	**8**
Career		44	40	24–16	1,310	1,896	69.1	14,584	7.7	111	41	148.7	370	1,017	2.8	17

== Personal life ==
Hodges gained the nickname "Duck" at Samford for his prowess at duck calling. Hodges won the 2009 Junior World Duck Calling Contest at age 13 and won the 2018 Alabama State Duck Calling Championship. His brother, Duncan, played quarterback for the VMI Keydets.

In May 2023, Hodges was confirmed to be in a relationship with country music artist Lainey Wilson. Wilson later revealed in an interview with The Bobby Bones Show that she and Hodges had been dating for over two years prior to the public revelation. In February 2025, Hodges announced that he and Wilson were engaged. They appeared together on Celebrity Family Feud on September 11, 2025. On May 10, 2026, the pair married.
