= 8th Indiana Cavalry Regiment =

8th Indiana Cavalry Regiment 39th Indiana Infantry Regiment
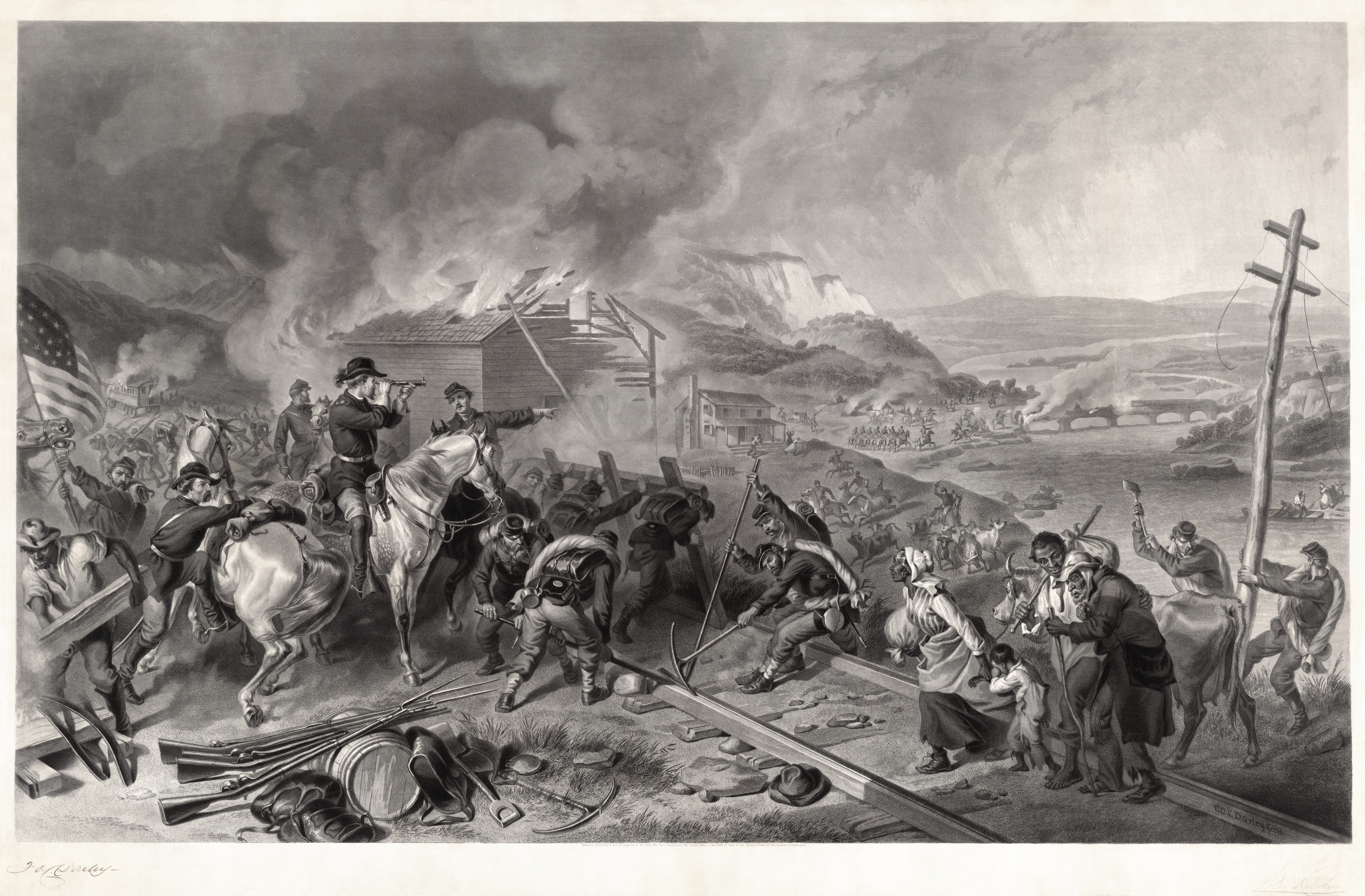
- The regiment took part in Sherman's March to the Sea.
- Active: 15 October 1863 – 20 July 1865
- Country: United States
- Allegiance: (United States) Union; Indiana
- Branch: Union Army
- Type: Cavalry
- Size: Regiment
- Engagements: American Civil War; Battle of Shiloh (1862); Battle of Stones River (1862–63); Tullahoma campaign (1863); Battle of Chickamauga (1863); Rousseau's Opelika Raid (1864); Battle of Brown's Mill (1864); Battle of Lovejoy's Station (1864); Sherman's March to the Sea (1864); Carolinas campaign (1865)

Commanders
- Notable commanders: Thomas J. Harrison; Fielder A. Jones

The 8th Indiana Cavalry Regiment was a cavalry regiment from Indiana that served in the Union Army during the American Civil War. The regiment mustered into service as the 39th Indiana Infantry Regiment on August 29, 1861, and fought at Shiloh and Stones River. After being converted to mounted infantry, the regiment served in the Tullahoma campaign and at Chickamauga. On October 15, 1863, the unit was renamed the 8th Indiana Cavalry and took part in Rousseau's Opelika Raid, and fought at Brown's Mill and Lovejoy's Station in the Atlanta campaign. The regiment served in Sherman's March to the Sea and the Carolinas campaign before being mustered out of service on July 20, 1865.

== Organization ==
Organized at Indianapolis, Ind., as 39th Regiment Infantry, August 29, 1861. Ordered to Kentucky and duty at Muldraugh's Hill, Camp Nevin, Nolin Creek and Green River until February, 1862. Attached to Wood's Brigade, McCook's Command, at Nolin, Army of the Ohio, October–November, 1861. 6th Brigade, Army of the Ohio, to December, 1861. 6th Brigade, 2nd Division, Army of the Ohio, to September, 1862. 6th Brigade, 2nd Division, 1st Army Corps, Army of the Ohio, to November, 1862. 1st Brigade, 2nd Division, Right Wing 14th Army Corps, Army of the Cumberland, to January, 1863. 1st Brigade, 2nd Division, 20th Army Corps, Army of the Cumberland, to April, 1863. Unassigned Cavalry Corps, Army of the Cumberland, to October, 1863. Designation changed to 8th Cavalry October 15, 1863. 1st Brigade, 2nd Division, Cavalry Corps, Army of the Cumberland, to April, 1864. 2nd Brigade, Kilpatrick's 3rd Division, Cavalry Corps, Army of the Cumberland, to October, 1864. 2nd Brigade, 3rd Division, Wilson's Cavalry Corps, Military Division Mississippi, to November, 1864. 1st Brigade, 3rd Division, Cavalry Corps, Military Division Mississippi, to July, 1865.

Original Organization of Regiment in 1863.
Company	Primary Place of Recruitment	Earliest Captain
A	Miami County	Orris Blake
B	Hamilton County	William Neal
C	Jay County	Stephan L. Wilson
D	Howard County	Thomas Herring
E	Hamilton County	Philip P. Whitesell
F	Bartholomew County	Button G. Cody
G	Tipton County	John Stevenson
H	Jefferson County	Thomas Graham
I	Hamilton County	John F. Longley
K	Jackson County	Charles A. Gordon
L	Delaware, Hamilton, Madison, Tipton, Jackson, and Shelby counties	Alfred J. Fortner
M	Delaware, Hamilton, Madison, Tipton, Jackson, and Shelby counties	Elhanan Van Lew Peterson

== Service ==
=== Infantry ===
Action at Upton's Hill, Ky., October 12, 1861. March to Bowling Green, Ky.; thence to Nashville, Tenn., February 14-March 2, 1862. March to Savannah, Tenn., March 16-April 6. Battle of Shiloh, Tenn., April 6–7. Advance on and siege of Corinth, Miss., April 29-May 30. Pursuit to Booneville May 31-June 6. Buell's Campaign in Northern Alabama and Middle Tennessee June to August. March to Nashville, Tenn.; thence to Louisville, Ky., in pursuit of Bragg August 20-September 26. Pursuit of Bragg into Kentucky October 1–15. Dog Walk October 8–9. March to Bowling Green, Ky.; thence to Nashville, Tenn., October 16-November 7, and duty there until December 26. Advance on Murfreesboro December 26–30. Battle of Stone's River December 30–31, 1862, and January 1–3, 1863. Duty at Murfreesboro until April. Reconnaissance to Middleton March 6–7. Christiana and Middleton March 6. Regiment mounted and changed to mounted infantry April, 1863. Expedition to Middleton May 21–22. Middleton May 22. Shelbyville Pike June 4. Operations on Eaglesville Pike June 4. Near Murfreesboro June 6. Middle Tennessee (or Tullahoma) Campaign June 22-July 7. Christiana June 24. Liberty Gap June 24–27. Tullahoma June 29–30. Occupation of Middle Tennessee until August 16. Passage of Cumberland Mountains and Tennessee River and Chickamauga (Ga.) Campaign August 16-September 22. Davis Ford, Chickamauga Creek, September 17. Battle of Chickamauga September 19–20. Mission Ridge September 22. Shallow Ford Road September 22. Companies "L" and "M" Join September, 1863. Expedition to East Tennessee after Champ Ferguson September–October. Designation changed from 39th Infantry to 8th Cavalry October 15, 1863.

=== Cavalry ===
Courier duty between Chattanooga, Tenn., and Ringgold, Ga., November–December. Operations about Sparta January 4–14, 1864. Mill Creek Gap February 25. Leet's Tan Yard March 5. Near Nickajack Gap March 9. Regiment Veteranize February 22, and Veterans on furlough April–May. Atlanta Campaign July to September. Rousseau's Raid July 10–22, 1864. Ten Island Ford, Coosa River, Ala., July 14. Near Greenpoint July 14. Chehaw Station and Notasulga July 18. Siege of Atlanta July 22-August 25. McCook's Raid to Atlanta & West Point R. R. July 27–31. Lovejoy Station July 29. Clear Creek and near Newnan July 30. Dalton August 14–15. Sandtown August 15. Fairburn August 15. Kilpatrick's Raid around Atlanta August 18–22. Camp Creek August 18. Jonesboro August 19–20. Lovejoy Station August 20. Flank movement on Jonesboro August 25–30. Camp Creek and Flint River Station August 30. Jonesboro August 31-September 1. Lovejoy Station September 2–6. Campbellton September 10. Operations against Hood in North Georgia and North Alabama September 29-November 3. Van Wert October 9–10. March to the sea November 15-December 10. Jonesboro November 15. Lovejoy Station November 16. Griswoldsville November 22. Milledgeville November 23. Sylvan Grove November 27. Waynesborough November 27–28. Near Waynesborough November 28. Buckhead Creek November 28 (Cos. "E," "G"). Buckhead Creek (or Reynolds' Plantation) November 28. Near Louisville November 29. Millen Grove December 1. Waynesboro December 4. Near Springfield December 10. Siege of Savannah December 10–21. Campaign of the Carolinas January to April, 1865. Blackville, S.C., February 7. Williston February 8. Johnson's Station February 10–11. Aiken February 11. Phillip's Cross Roads, N. C., March 4. Taylor's Hole Creek, Averysboro, March 16. Battle of Bentonville March 19–21. Occupation of Goldsboro March 24. Advance on Raleigh April 9–13. Raleigh April 13. Morristown April 13. Bennett's House April 26. Surrender of Johnston and his army. Duty in the Dept. of North Carolina until July. Mustered out July 20, 1865. Dismounted detachment left in Tennessee. Action at Pulaski September 26–27, 1864. Sparta November 29. Franklin November 30. Nashville December 15–16. Pulaski December 25–26.

Regiment lost during service 9 Officers and 138 Enlisted men killed and mortally wounded and 1 Officer and 250 Enlisted men by disease. Total 398.

== See also ==
- List of Indiana Civil War units
- Arad Simon Lakin
