= Spencer Brown (running back) =

American gridiron football player (born 1998)

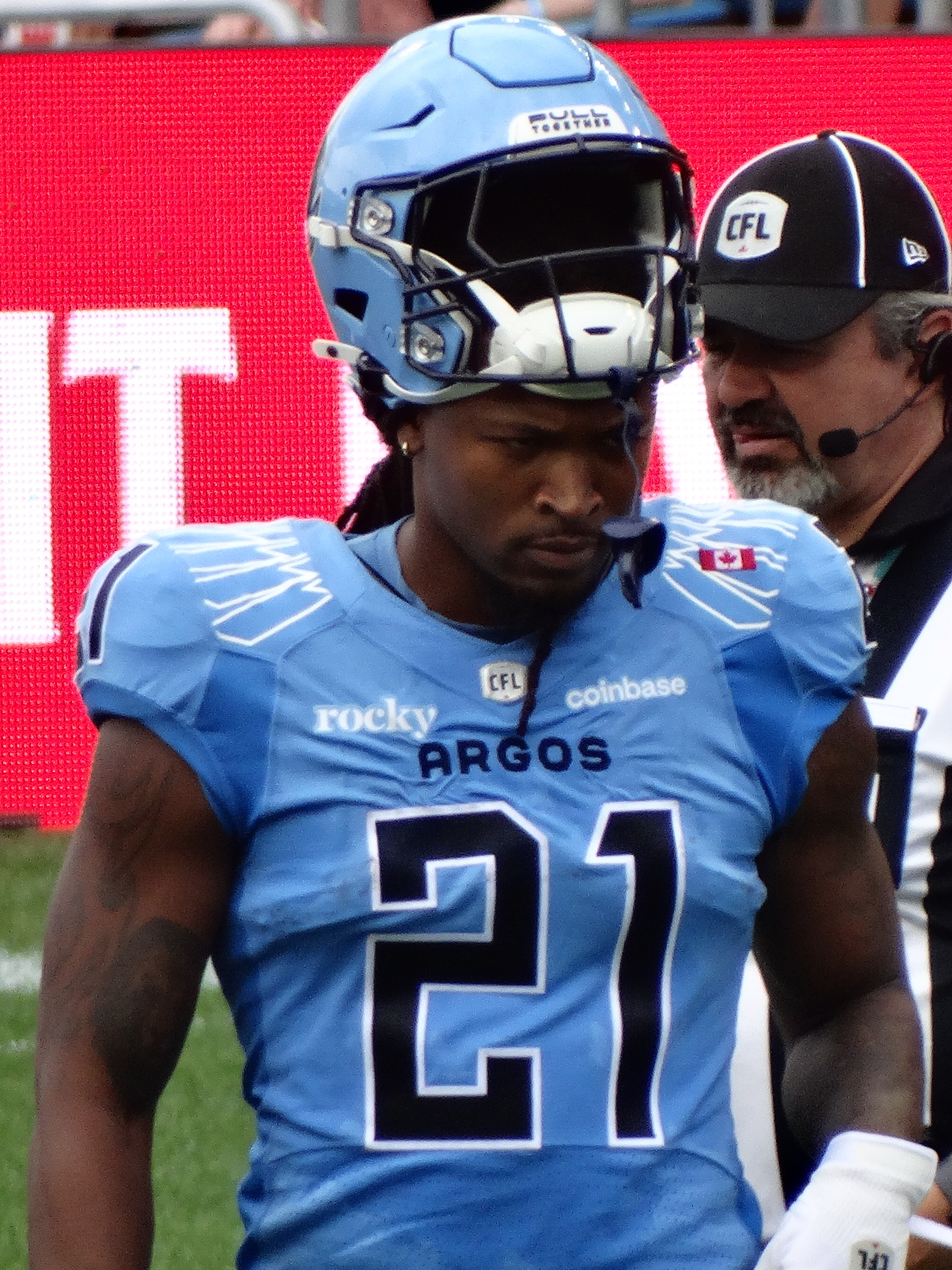
- Brown with the Toronto Argonauts in 2025

Profile
- Position: Running back

Personal information
- Born: November 13, 1998 (age 27); Warrior, Alabama, U.S.
- Listed height: 6 ft 0 in (1.83 m)
- Listed weight: 220 lb (100 kg)

Career information
- High school: Mortimer Jordan
- College: UAB (2017–2020)
- NFL draft: 2021: undrafted

Career history
- Carolina Panthers (2021–2023); Atlanta Falcons (2024)*; Hamilton Tiger-Cats (2025)*; Edmonton Elks (2025)*; Toronto Argonauts (2025)
- * Offseason or practice squad member only

Awards and highlights
- First-team All-CUSA (2018)

Career NFL statistics
- Rushing yards: 43
- Rushing average: 4.8
- Receptions: 2
- Receiving yards: 10
- Stats at Pro Football Reference
- Stats at CFL.ca

Spencer Brown (born November 13, 1998) is an American professional football running back. He played college football at UAB and holds multiple school career rushing records. He was signed by the Carolina Panthers as an undrafted free agent in 2021.

== Early life ==
Spencer was born and raised in Birmingham, Alabama, and attended Mortimer Jordan High School. As a senior he was selected to the first-team All-Birmingham list after he rushed for 1,972 yards on 304 carries and tallied 33 total touchdowns. Brown was ranked as a two-star high school prospect by 247Sports.

== College career ==
As a true freshman at UAB in 2017, Brown appeared in all 13 games and made nine starts. He rushed for 1329 yards, which was the third-most yards in school history and added 10 touchdowns. He broke Jordan Howard's freshman rushing record in his eighth game. On November 4, 2017, he scored three touchdowns in a game against Rice. Had his first career 100-yard rushing game in week 2 against Ball State with 151 yards on 17 carries. He was named to the Football Writers Association of America Freshman All-America Team, named Conference USA (C-USA)'s Freshman of the Year, second-team All-C-USA, and named to the Doak Walker Award watchlist.

As a sophomore, Brown was named first-team All-C-USA and awarded the C-USA Championship Game MVP award. He set a school record with 16 touchdowns and rushed for 1,227 yards. In 2019, Brown became UAB's career rushing leader and set the school record for 100-yard rushing games as he had rushed for 100 yards for the 13th time. As a senior, Brown again won the C-USA Championship Game MVP award and became UAB's all time rushing touchdown leader. He is the only player in C-USA history to be named C-USA Championship Game MVP twice. He finished his collegiate career second among active players in rushing yards and was one of two players to have eclipsed 4,000 career rushing yards.

== Professional career ==
Pre-draft measurables
Height	Weight	Arm length	Hand span	Wingspan	40-yard dash	10-yard split	20-yard split	20-yard shuttle	Three-cone drill	Vertical jump	Broad jump	Bench press
5 ft 10 3/8 in (1.79 m)	208 lb (94 kg)	30 5/8 in (0.78 m)	8 1/2 in (0.22 m)	6 ft 3 1/8 in (1.91 m)	4.58 s	1.60 s	2.66 s	4.39 s	7.38 s	36.5 in (0.93 m)	10 ft 1 in (3.07 m)	16 reps
All values from Pro Day

=== Carolina Panthers ===
Brown signed with the Carolina Panthers after going undrafted in the 2021 NFL draft on May 2, 2021. He played in the Panther's first preseason game on August 15, 2021 against the Indianapolis Colts, rushing for 25 yards on nine carries. He was waived on August 31, 2021, and re-signed to the practice squad the next day. He signed a reserve/future contract with the Panthers on January 10, 2022.

On August 30, 2022, Brown was waived/injured by the Panthers and placed on injured reserve. He was released on September 9. He was re-signed to the practice squad on October 18. He signed a reserve/future contract on January 9, 2023.

On August 29, 2023, Brown was waived for final roster cuts, but signed to the Panthers' practice squad the following day. He was released on September 13. On November 6, Brown was signed again to the practice squad. He signed a reserve/future contract on January 8, 2024.

On May 10, 2024, Brown was waived for offseason roster cuts.

=== Atlanta Falcons ===
On August 11, 2024, Brown signed with the Atlanta Falcons. He was released as part of final roster cuts on August 27.

=== Hamilton Tiger-Cats ===
Brown signed with the Hamilton Tiger-Cats on January 15, 2025. He was an early cut in training camp on May 14, 2025.

=== Edmonton Elks ===
The Edmonton Elks announced on June 22, 2025, that they added Brown to their practice roster. He did not dress in any games for the Elks.

=== Toronto Argonauts ===
On August 5, 2025, it was announced that Brown had been traded to the Toronto Argonauts in exchange for a conditional eighth-round pick in the 2026 CFL draft.

On May 13, 2026, Brown was released by the Argonauts.
