= Arad Simon Lakin =

American minister, university president (1810–1890)

- Born: May 10, 1810; Hancock, Delaware County, New York, U.S.
- Died: January 22, 1890 (aged 79); Rockport, Rooks County, Kansas, U.S.
- Occupations: Methodist minister, missionary, university president

Rev. Arad Simon Lakin (May 10, 1810–January 22, 1890) was an American minister, and university president. He was a Methodist minister from New York state, sent to Alabama in order to reestablish the national Methodist Church in the state, and was labeled a "carpetbagger" by Southerners. He was appointed president of the University of Alabama during the Reconstruction era.

== Biography ==
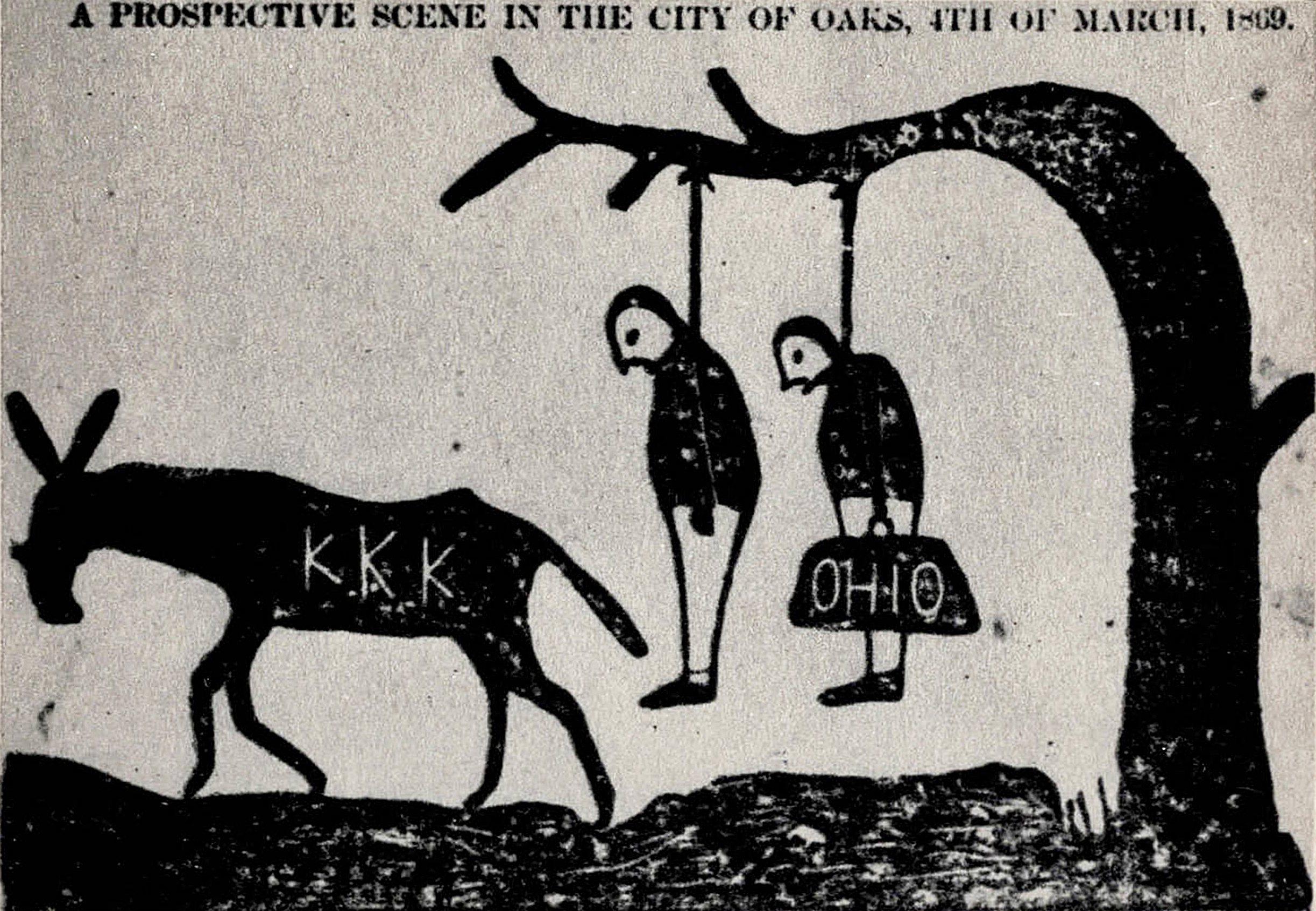
Cartoon from September 1, 1868, published in the Tuscaloosa Independent Monitor. Lakin ("Ohio") and Cloud were the subject's hanging from the tree

Arad Simon Lakin was born in 1810 in Hancock, Delaware County, New York. He grew up in New York state in rural poverty. Lakin served as the Chaplain of the 8th Indiana Cavalry, Union Army, during the American Civil War.

He was a reverend from Ohio and had been active in the political organizing of freed slaves. The Bishop of Ohio sent minister Lakin to Alabama as a missionary for the national Methodist Episcopal Church (MEC). His goal was to establish a biracial congregation at MEC in Alabama and as a result, the Ku Klux Klan targeted Lakin. On September 1, 1868, Lakin and Alabama School Superintendent Noah B. Cloud were the subject's of a Klan cartoon published in the Tuscaloosa Independent Monitor. The cartoon featured images of the two educators lynched and hanging from a tree in the "City of Oaks" (or Tuscaloosa), with a KKK-labeled donkey below them, walking away.

He resigned as president of the University of Alabama after Professor Wyman, who served on the university's board and who had refused to serve as president himself, refused to turn the keys over to Lakin.

He died on January 22, 1890, in Rockport, Kansas, and was buried in Alabama.

== See also ==
- Presidents of the University of Alabama
