= 2026 Alabama State Board of Education election =

- November 3, 2026

5 of 9 members of the Alabama State Board of Education
	First party	Second party
Party	Republican	Democratic
Seats before	7	2
Seats after	7	2
Seat change	Steady	Steady
- Map of the incumbents Democratic incumbent Republican incumbent Republican incumbent term-limited No election

The 2026 Alabama State Board of Education election was held on November 3, 2026, to elect five members to the Alabama State Board of Education. Primary elections were held on May 19.

== Summary ==
=== By district ===
District		Incumbent				Candidates
Number	2024 Pres.	Member	Party	First elected	Status	Candidates
2nd	R+38.8	Tracie West	Republican	2018	Incumbent running.	▌Tracie West (Republican); ▌Jamie McCurry (Democratic)
4th	D+30.4	Yvette Richardson	Democratic	2010	Incumbent running.	▌Yvette Richardson (Democratic)
6th	R+62.2	Marie Manning	Republican	2022	Incumbent lost re-nomination.	▌Cathi Bradford (Republican); ▌Angela Morgan (Democratic)
8th	R+26.1	Wayne Reynolds	Republican	2018	Incumbent retiring.	▌Emily Jones (Republican); ▌Shatika Armstrong (Democratic)

== District 2 ==
=== Republican primary ===
==== Candidates ====
===== Nominee =====
- Tracie West, incumbent board member

==== Endorsements ====
Tracie West

Organizations

- Alabama Realtors PAC

=== Democratic primary ===
==== Candidates ====
===== Nominee =====
- Jamie McCurry, Auburn University student

=== General election ===
==== Post-primary endorsements ====
Tracie West (R)

Organizations

- Alabama Farmers Federation
Jamie McCurry (D)

Organizations

- Alabama AFL-CIO

==== Fundraising ====
Campaign finance reports as of November 2, 2026
Candidate	Raised	Other receipts	Spent	Cash on hand
Tracie West (R) (Note: Including transactions in 2026 and beginning balance alone)	$12,698	$0	$160	$12,538
Jamie McCurry (D)	$1,885	$0	$1,197	$688
Source: Alabama FCPA

==== Results ====
2026 Alabama State Board of Education election, district 2
Party	Candidate	Votes	%
Republican	Tracie West (incumbent)	115,373	61.49
Democratic	Jamie McCurry	72,056	38.40
Write-in		199	0.11
Total votes		187,628	100.00

== District 4 ==
=== Democratic primary ===
==== Candidates ====
===== Nominee =====
- Yvette Richardson, incumbent board member

=== General election ===
==== Endorsements ====
Yvette Richardson (D)

Organizations

- Alabama AFL-CIO

==== Fundraising ====
Campaign finance reports as of November 2, 2026
Candidate	Raised	Other receipts	Spent	Cash on hand
Yvette Richardson (D)	$10,000	$0	$2,951	$7,049
Source: Alabama FCPA

==== Results ====
2026 Alabama State Board of Education election, district 4
Party	Candidate	Votes	%
Democratic	Yvette Richardson (incumbent)	153,610	98.50
Write-in		2,333	1.50
Total votes		155,943	100.00

== District 6 ==
=== Republican primary ===
==== Candidates ====
===== Nominee =====
- Cathi Bradford, educator

===== Eliminated in primary =====
- Marie Manning, incumbent board member

==== Endorsements ====
Cathi Bradford

Organizations

- Eagle Forum PAC

==== Fundraising ====
Campaign finance reports as of May 18, 2026
Candidate	Raised	Other receipts	Spent	Cash on hand
Cathi Bradford (R)	$38,280	$9,000	$45,032	$2,248
Marie Manning (R)	$26,229	$45,000	$64,653	$10,080
Source: Alabama FCPA

==== Results ====
Republican primary
Party	Candidate	Votes	%
Republican	Cathi Bradford	35,615	54.0
Republican	Marie Manning (incumbent)	30,388	46.0
Total votes		66,003	100.0

=== Democratic primary ===
==== Candidates ====
===== Nominee =====
- Angela Morgan, retired educator

=== General election ===
==== Post-primary endorsements ====
Angela Morgan (D)

Organizations

- Alabama AFL-CIO

==== Fundraising ====
Campaign finance reports as of November 2, 2026
Candidate	Raised	Other receipts	Spent	Cash on hand
Cathi Bradford (R)	$63,060	$9,638	$61,216	$9,482
Source: Alabama FCPA

==== Results ====
2026 Alabama State Board of Education election, district 6
Party	Candidate	Votes	%
Republican	Cathi Bradford	136,622	71.25
Democratic	Angela Morgan	54,765	28.56
Write-in		353	0.18
Total votes		191,740	100.00

== District 8 ==
=== Republican primary ===
==== Candidates ====
===== Nominee =====
- Emily Jones, Madison County Moms for Liberty chair

===== Advanced to runoff =====
- William Matthews

===== Eliminated in primary =====
- Connie Spears, Madison city councilor

===== Declined =====
- Wayne Reynolds, incumbent board member

==== Endorsements ====
Emily Jones

Organizations

- Alabama Farmers Federation (endorsed after first round)

==== Fundraising ====
Campaign finance reports as of May 18, 2026
Candidate	Raised	Other receipts	Spent	Cash on hand
Emily Jones (R)	$30,389	$0	$27,791	$2,598
William Matthews (R)	$23,609	$18,000	$31,778	$9,830
Connie Spears (R)	$19,565	$17,761	$27,914	$9,411
Source: Alabama FCPA

==== Results ====
Republican primary
Party	Candidate	Votes	%
Republican	Emily Jones	16,409	42.7
Republican	William Matthews	11,731	30.6
Republican	Connie Spears	10,259	26.7
Total votes		38,399	100.0

==== Runoff ====
===== Fundraising =====
Campaign finance reports as of June 15, 2026
Candidate	Raised	Other receipts	Spent	Cash on hand
Emily Jones (R)	$36,314	$0	$31,302	$5,223
William Matthews (R)	$96,359	$25,000	$121,142	$216
Source: Alabama FCPA

===== Results =====
Republican primary runoff
Party	Candidate	Votes	%
Republican	Emily Jones	18,629	53.6
Republican	William Matthews	16,162	46.4
Total votes		34,791	100.00

=== Democratic primary ===
==== Candidates ====
===== Nominee =====
- Shatika Armstrong, educator

==== Fundraising ====
Campaign finance reports as of May 18, 2026
Candidate	Raised	Other receipts	Spent	Cash on hand
Shatika Armstrong (D)	$8,111	$0	$7,432	$679
Source: Alabama FCPA

=== General election ===
==== Post-primary endorsements ====
Shatika Armstrong (D)

Organizations

- Alabama AFL-CIO
- SPLC Action Fund

==== Fundraising ====
Campaign finance reports as of November 2, 2026
Candidate	Raised	Other receipts	Spent	Cash on hand
Emily Jones (R)	$51,714	$0	$41,048	$10,666
Shatika Armstrong (D)	$41,377	$271	$23,564	$18,084
Source: Alabama FCPA

==== Results ====
2026 Alabama State Board of Education election, district 8
Party	Candidate	Votes	%
Republican	Emily Jones	123,654	53.73
Democratic	Shatika Armstrong	106,282	46.18
Write-in		195	0.08
Total votes		230,131	100.00

== Ex-officio ==
As the Governor of Alabama serves as a voting member of the Board of Education, the concurrent gubernatorial election was one of the five positions up for election. Tommy Tuberville was elected.
