= Alabama State Board of Education =

Government agency of Alabama, United States

Agency overview
- Formed: 1868
- Parent agency: Alabama State Department of Education

The Alabama State Board of Education is an administrative agency created by the Constitution of Alabama that is responsible for supervising the state's public school system. The Board consists of eight members who are elected from districts and the Governor of Alabama, and is responsible for appointing the State Superintendent of Education.

== Responsibilities ==
The State Board of Education is responsible for the "general control and supervision over the public schools of the state," which includes the power to adopt rules regarding teacher training and certification, administer vocational education programs under federal law, and supervise educational work done in state penal institutions. The Board appoints the Superintendent, who is responsible for enforcing the rules adopted by the Board.

== History ==
The state's 1868 constitution, adopted during Reconstruction, created an elected Board of Education and an elected Superintendent of Public Instruction to manage the state's public school system and higher education institutions. There were twelve members of the Board, with two elected from each of the state's six congressional districts to four year terms. The Superintendent and Governor were also members of the Board, with the Superintendent serving as President and having a tie-breaking vote and the Governor serving in an ex officio capacity. Following the end of Reconstruction, however, the 1868 constitution was replaced with a new constitution in 1876, which abolished the Board of Education and consolidated administrative power in the elected Superintendent.

Voters continued electing the Superintendent until 1970. In 1969, voters ratified a constitutional amendment that restored an elected State Board of Education with the power to appoint the State Superintendent of Education. The Board members were elected by district, but the Alabama Legislature declined to redraw the districts following the 1970 or 1980 censuses. Accordingly, in 1985, Judge Truman McGill Hobbs of the United States District Court for the Middle District of Alabama adopted a redistricting plan that created a Black-majority district. That year, Ethel Hall and Willie Paul became the first Black members elected to the Board since the 1870s, and Republican Spencer Bachus became the first Republican member elected to the Board in its modern form.

Democrats held a majority on the Board from 1971 to 1997, when Bradley Byrne, who had been elected as a Democrat, switched to the Republican Party. Byrne's switch left the balance of the Board at a 4-4 tie, enabling Republican Governor Fob James to break the tie. In 1998, when Democrat Don Siegelman won the gubernatorial election and all incumbents won re-election, the Democratic majority was restored. In 2002, when Byrne was elected to the State Senate and resigned his seat, Siegelman, who had been defeated for re-election that year by Republican Bob Riley, appointed Democrat Pam Baker to succeed him, giving Democrats an absolute majority on the Board. When Riley was sworn in, he sought to recall Baker's appointment, which threatened a lawsuit. Baker, however, ultimately resigned from the seat, avoiding a court battle and allowing Riley to appoint Republican Randy McKinney later that year. In 2008, when Republican Gary Warren was elected to succeed Democrat Sandra Ray in the 7th district, Republicans won their first outright majority on the Board. They further added to their majority in 2010, when Republican Mary Scott Hunter was elected to replace Democrat Mary Jane Caylor in the 8th district, expanding the Republican majority to 7-2.

== Members ==
Districts shaded by incumbent's party: Democratic (2) Republican (7)

The Board consists of nine members - eight from each of the districts, and the Governor of Alabama, who serves as the president of the Board ex officio. Members are elected to four year terms.

Alabama State Board of Education Members
District	Name	Party	Start	Last election	Next election
1	Jackie Zeigler	Republican	January 24, 2017	2024	2028
2	Tracie West	Republican	January 1, 2019	2022	2026
3	Kelly Mooney	Republican	January 20, 2025	2024	2028
4	Yvette Richardson	Democratic	January 17, 2011	2022	2026
5	Tonya Smith Chestnut, Vice President	Democratic	January 18, 2021	2024	2028
6	Marie Manning, President pro tempore	Republican	January 16, 2023	2022	2026 (primaried)
7	Allen Long	Republican	January 20, 2025	2024	2028
8	Wayne Reynolds	Republican	January 1, 2019	2022	2026 (retiring)
Governor	Kay Ivey, President (ex officio)	Republican	April 10, 2017 (elevated)	2022	2026 (retiring)

== See also ==
- Alabama Department of Education
