= Morris, Alabama =

- Town
- Location of Morris in Jefferson County, Alabama.
- Coordinates: 33°45′03″N 86°48′15″W
- Country: United States
- State: Alabama
- County: Jefferson

Area
  - Total: 3.19 sq mi (8.26 km^{2})
  - Land: 3.18 sq mi (8.23 km^{2})
  - Water: 0.012 sq mi (0.03 km^{2})
- Elevation: 440 ft (130 m)

Population (2020)
  - Total: 2,259
  - Density: 710.6/sq mi (274.38/km^{2})
- Time zone: UTC-6 (Central (CST))
  - Summer (DST): UTC-5 (CDT)
- ZIP code: 35116
- Area codes: 205 & 659
- FIPS code: 01-51456
- GNIS feature ID: 2406195
- Website: www.morrisalabama.com

Morris is a town in Jefferson County, Alabama, United States. It is north of the Birmingham suburb of Gardendale. It initially incorporated on September 19, 1885. At some point after 1910, its incorporation lapsed and it failed to appear on the census rolls beginning in 1920 through to 1950. It reincorporated on July 11, 1950. As of the 2020 census, Morris had a population of 2,259.

The town is named after Mary Hunter "Mae" Morris, an early female pioneer of the region.

== Geography ==
According to the U.S. Census Bureau, the town has a total area of 3.1 square miles (8.0 km^{2}), of which 3.0 square miles (7.8 km^{2}) is land and 0.33% is water.

== Demographics ==
Historical population
Census	Pop.	Note	%±
1890	156		—
1900	187		19.9%
1910	299		59.9%
1960	638		—
1970	519		−18.7%
1980	623		20.0%
1990	1,136		82.3%
2000	1,827		60.8%
2010	1,859		1.8%
2020	2,259		21.5%
U.S. Decennial Census; 2013 Estimate

=== Racial and ethnic composition ===
Morris town, Alabama – Racial and ethnic composition Note: the US Census treats Hispanic/Latino as an ethnic category. This table excludes Latinos from the racial categories and assigns them to a separate category. Hispanics/Latinos may be of any race.
Race / Ethnicity (NH = Non-Hispanic)	Pop 2000	Pop 2010	Pop 2020	% 2000	% 2010	% 2020
White alone (NH)	1,792	1,809	2,096	98.08%	97.31%	92.78%
Black or African American alone (NH)	9	19	45	0.49%	1.02%	1.99%
Native American or Alaska Native alone (NH)	1	0	2	0.05%	0.00%	0.09%
Asian alone (NH)	5	5	11	0.27%	0.27%	0.49%
Native Hawaiian or Pacific Islander alone (NH)	0	0	0	0.00%	0.00%	0.00%
Other race alone (NH)	2	0	6	0.11%	0.00%	0.27%
Mixed race or Multiracial (NH)	11	6	79	0.60%	0.32%	3.50%
Hispanic or Latino (any race)	7	20	20	0.38%	1.08%	0.89%
Total	1,827	1,859	2,259	100.00%	100.00%	100.00%

=== 2020 census ===
As of the 2020 census, Morris had a population of 2,259. The median age was 41.1 years. 23.3% of residents were under the age of 18 and 18.1% of residents were 65 years of age or older. For every 100 females there were 91.0 males, and for every 100 females age 18 and over there were 86.8 males age 18 and over.

0.0% of residents lived in urban areas, while 100.0% lived in rural areas.

There were 881 households in Morris, of which 33.8% had children under the age of 18 living in them. Of all households, 57.8% were married-couple households, 11.7% were households with a male householder and no spouse or partner present, and 25.7% were households with a female householder and no spouse or partner present. About 22.4% of all households were made up of individuals and 11.5% had someone living alone who was 65 years of age or older.

There were 964 housing units, of which 8.6% were vacant. The homeowner vacancy rate was 0.3% and the rental vacancy rate was 28.1%.

=== 2010 census ===
At the 2010 census the total population was 1,859. There were 719 households and 555 families in the town. The population density was 619.7 inhabitants per square mile (239.3/km^{2}). There were 762 housing units at an average density of 254 per square mile (98/km^{2}). The racial makeup of the town was 97.7% White, 1.0% Black or African American, 0.1% Native American, 0.3% Asian, 0.5% from other races, and 0.4% from two or more races. 1.1% of the population were Hispanic or Latino of any race. Of the 719 households 33.1% had children under the age of 18 living with them, 62.4% were married couples living together, 10.4% had a female householder with no husband present, and 22.8% were non-families. 19.9% of households were one person and 9.4% were one person aged 65 or older. The average household size was 2.59 and the average family size was 2.98.

The age distribution was 23.2% under the age of 18, 8.4% from 18 to 24, 24.1% from 25 to 44, 30.0% from 45 to 64, and 14.3% 65 or older. The median age was 41.4 years. For every 100 females, there were 90.3 males. For every 100 females age 18 and over, there were 90.6 males.

The median household income was $61,188 and the median family income was $68,333. Males had a median income of $48,125 versus $38,611 for females. The per capita income for the town was $27,390. About 2.6% of families and 3.4% of the population were below the poverty line, including 3.3% of those under age 18 and 2.5% of those age 65 or over.

=== 2000 census ===
At the 2000 census the total population was 1,922. There were 708 households and 575 families in the town. The population density was 600.2 inhabitants per square mile (231.7/km^{2}). There were 619 housing units at an average density of 225.7 per square mile (87.1/km^{2}). The racial makeup of the town was 98.54% White, 0.5% Black or African American, 0.01% Native American, 0.3% Asian, 0.1% from other races, and 0.60% from two or more races. 0.38% of the population were Hispanic or Latino of any race. Of the 662 households 43.5% had children under the age of 18 living with them, 71.0% were married couples living together, 9.5% had a female householder with no husband present, and 17.1% were non-families. 15.4% of households were one person and 5.9% were one person aged 65 or older. The average household size was 2.76 and the average family size was 3.07.

The age distribution was 28.4% under the age of 18, 8.3% from 18 to 24, 32.5% from 25 to 44, 22.0% from 45 to 64, and 8.9% 65 or older. The median age was 34 years. For every 100 females, there were 94.2 males. For every 100 females age 18 and over, there were 90.0 males.

The median household income was $46,296 and the median family income was $51,314. Males had a median income of $38,500 versus $31,224 for females. The per capita income for the town was $19,924. About 0.3% of families and 0.5% of the population were below the poverty line, including none of those under age 18 and 2.0% of those age 65 or over.

== Public safety ==
Morris is served by a full-time police force and by a full time fire department. The police department is dispatched by Warrior police and the fire department is dispatched by Jefferson County 911.

== Education ==
Bryan Elementary School, North Jefferson Middle School and Mortimer Jordan High School are all located in the nearby City of Kimberly.

== Notable people ==
- Pat Buttram, star of Green Acres as Mr. Haney and Gene Autry Sidekick
- Haylie McCleney, US Softball Olympian
- Peter Tom Willis, former NFL quarterback
