= 2022 Alabama State Board of Education election =

- November 8, 2022

5 seats up for election
	First party	Second party	Third party
Party	Republican	Democratic	Libertarian
Seats before	7	2	0
Seats after	7	2	0
Seat change	Steady	Steady	Steady
Popular vote	388,202	105,262	29,265
Percentage	73.08%	19.82%	5.51%

The 2022 Alabama State Board of Education election was held on November 8, 2022, to elect four members to the Alabama State Board of Education. Primary elections were held on May 24.

== District 2 ==
=== Republican primary ===
==== Candidates ====
===== Nominee =====
- Tracie West, incumbent board member

===== Eliminated in primary =====
- Alex Balkcum, candidate for the Alabama House of Representatives in 2014

==== Results ====
Republican primary
Party	Candidate	Votes	%
Republican	Tracie West (incumbent)	42,298	66.78
Republican	Alex Balkcum	21,041	33.22
Total votes		63,339	100.00

=== General election ===
==== Results ====
2022 Alabama State Board of Education District 2 election
Party	Candidate	Votes	%
Republican	Tracie West (incumbent)	120,488	98.13
Write-in		2,297	1.87
Total votes		122,785	100.00

== District 4 ==
=== Democratic primary ===
==== Candidates ====
===== Nominee =====
- Yvette Richardson, incumbent board member

=== General election ===
==== Results ====
2022 Alabama State Board of Education District 4 election
Party	Candidate	Votes	%
Democratic	Yvette Richardson (incumbent)	105,262	97.37
Write-in		2,847	2.63
Total votes		108,109	100.00

== District 6 ==
=== Republican primary ===
==== Candidates ====
===== Nominee =====
- Marie Manning, St. Clair County Board of Education vice president

===== Eliminated in primary =====
- Priscilla Yother, elementary school principal

==== Results ====
Republican primary
Party	Candidate	Votes	%
Republican	Marie Manning	52,321	66.78
Republican	Priscilla Yother	26,841	33.22
Total votes		79,162	100.00

=== General election ===
==== Results ====
2022 Alabama State Board of Education District 6 election
Party	Candidate	Votes	%
Republican	Marie Manning	148,227	98.77
Write-in		1,847	1.23
Total votes		150,074	100.00

== District 8 ==
=== Republican primary ===
==== Candidates ====
===== Nominee =====
- Wayne Reynolds, incumbent board member

===== Eliminated in primary =====
- Rex Davis

==== Results ====
Republican primary
Party	Candidate	Votes	%
Republican	Wayne Reynolds (incumbent)	37,531	58.85
Republican	Rex Davis	26,238	41.15
Total votes		63,769	100.00

=== Libertarian convention ===
==== Nominee ====
- Patrick Wallace, youth soccer coach

=== General election ===
==== Results ====
2022 Alabama State Board of Education District 8 election
Party	Candidate	Votes	%
Republican	Wayne Reynolds (incumbent)	119,487	79.54
Libertarian	Patrick Wallace	29,265	19.48
Write-in		1,471	0.98
Total votes		150,223	100.00

== Ex-officio ==
As the Governor of Alabama serves as a voting member of the Board of Education, the concurrent gubernatorial election served as one of the five positions up for election. Incumbent Republican Kay Ivey was re-elected.
