= 2024 Alabama State Board of Education election =

- November 5, 2024

4 seats up for election
	First party	Second party
Party	Republican	Democratic
Seats before	7	2
Seats after	7	2
Seat change	Steady	Steady
Popular vote	805,119	142,007
Percentage	83.99%	14.81%
Swing	▲10.91%	▼5.01%

The 2024 Alabama State Board of Education election was held on November 5, 2024 to elect four of nine members of the Alabama State Board of Education. Primary elections were held on March 5, 2024.

== District 1 ==
=== Republican primary ===
==== Candidates ====
===== Nominee =====
- Jackie Zeigler, incumbent Board of Education District 1 representative (2017–present)

=== General election ===
==== Results ====
2024 Alabama State Board of Education District 1 election
Party	Candidate	Votes	%
Republican	Jackie Zeigler (incumbent)	220,386	98.62%
Write-in		3,076	1.38%
Total votes		223,462	100.00%

== District 3 ==
=== Republican primary ===
==== Candidates ====
===== Nominee =====
- Kelly Mooney, school administrator

===== Eliminated in primary =====
- Charlotte Meadows, state representative from the 74th district (2019–2022)
- Ann Eubank, anti-Common Core advocate
- Melissa Snowden (not reported in final result tallies)

==== Results ====
Republican primary
Party	Candidate	Votes	%
Republican	Kelly Mooney	38,697	57.96
Republican	Charlotte Meadows	17,532	26.26
Republican	Ann C. Eubank	10,537	15.78
Total votes		66,766	100.00

=== General election ===
==== Results ====
2024 Alabama State Board of Education District 3 election
Party	Candidate	Votes	%
Republican	Kelly Mooney	226,243	97.76%
Write-in		5,179	2.24%
Total votes		231,422	100.00%

== District 5 ==
=== Democratic primary ===
==== Candidates ====
===== Nominee =====
- Tonya Smith Chestnut, incumbent Board of Education District 5 representative (2021–present)

=== Republican primary ===
==== Candidates ====
===== Nominee =====
- David Perry

=== General election ===
==== Results ====
2024 Alabama State Board of Education District 5 election
Party	Candidate	Votes	%
Democratic	Tonya Smith Chestnut (incumbent)	142,007	54.99
Republican	David Perry	115,827	44.85
Write-in		417	0.16
Total votes		258,251	100.00

== District 7 ==
=== Republican primary ===
==== Candidates ====
===== Nominee =====
- Allen Long, doctor

===== Eliminated in primary =====
- Doug Bachuss, Decatur City Schools District 3 representative (2020–present)
- Oscar Mann, member of the Jefferson County School District, Place 3 (2012–present)

==== Results ====
Republican primary
Party	Candidate	Votes	%
Republican	Allen Long	52,769	60.91
Republican	Doug Bachuss	23,348	26.95
Republican	Oscar S. Mann	10,513	12.14
Total votes		86,630	100.00

=== General election ===
==== Results ====
2024 Alabama State Board of Education District 7 election
Party	Candidate	Votes	%
Republican	Allen Long	242,663	98.84%
Write-in		2,839	1.16%
Total votes		245,502	100.00%
