= Pat Keedy =

American baseball player (born 1958)

- Third baseman
- Born: January 10, 1958 (age 68); Birmingham, Alabama, U.S.
- Batted: Right Threw: Right

MLB debut
- September 10, 1985, for the California Angels

Last MLB appearance
- May 3, 1989, for the Cleveland Indians

MLB statistics
- Batting average: .203
- Home runs: 3
- Runs batted in: 4
- Stats at Baseball Reference

Teams
- California Angels (1985); Chicago White Sox (1987); Cleveland Indians (1989)

Charles Patrick Keedy (born January 10, 1958) is an American former collegiate and professional baseball player who played for Auburn University and three seasons for the California Angels, Chicago White Sox, and Cleveland Indians of the Major League Baseball (MLB). Keedy is now the Principal at Corner High School in Jefferson County, AL.
