= Alabama Superintendent of Education =

Superintendent of Alabama
- Incumbent; Eric Mackey since May 14, 2018
- Appointer: Alabama State Board of Education
- Formation: 1865
- First holder: Noah B. Cloud
- Salary: $325,000 per year

The Alabama Superintendent of Education is an executive position in the Government of Alabama that is appointed by the Alabama State Board of Education. It was an elected position prior to 1969, when a constitutional amendment changed the position to be appointed.

== History ==
The first superintendent was Noah B. Cloud, appointed after the American Civil War in 1865, and elected in 1868.

In April 2025, the yearly salary was increased to $325,000, after a vote by the State Board of Education.

== Duties ==
The primary duty of the superintendent is to enforce rules made by the State Board of Education. They also fulfill administrative duties for the Alabama State Department of Education.
