= Corner High School =

Location
- 4301 Warrior Jasper Road; Dora, Alabama 35062; United States; 33°45′40″N 86°58′03″W

Information
- Type: Public
- Motto: "Commit to the C"
- Established: 1923 (103 years ago)
- School board: Jefferson County Schools
- CEEB code: 012795
- Principal: Pat Keedy
- Teaching staff: 28.00 (on an FTE basis)
- Grades: 9-12
- Enrollment: 519 (2023–2024)
- Student to teacher ratio: 18.54
- Campus: Suburban
- Colors: Black and gold
- Athletics: AHSAA Class 5A
- Mascot: Yellow Jacket
- Rival: Dora High School
- Feeder schools: Corner Middle School
- Website: www.jefcoed.com/cornerhs

Corner High School (CHS) is a four-year public high school in the Birmingham, Alabama suburb of Dora. It is one of fourteen high schools in the Jefferson County School System. School colors are black and gold, and the athletic teams are called the Yellowjackets. CHS competes in AHSAA Class 4A athletics.

== History ==
In the northwest corner of Jefferson County, surrounded by Walker and Blount Counties, is a community called Corner. The first school at Corner opened in 1884 in a log building half a mile from where the present Corner Middle School (5–8) building now stands. The first school was a one-room structure in which seven grades were taught by one teacher. In 1908, the building was destroyed by a tornado. In 1910, the school was moved to what is now the parking area at Corner Middle School. In 1917, library service was established. Corner School had its first graduation in 1921 with seven members graduating.

In 1922, the building was moved to the current Corner Middle School site and a four-room tile wing was constructed. In 1923, Corner became an accredited high school. During 1927–28, the library, auditorium, and office were added to the four room wing. From 1941 to 1963, many changes were made. A high school gymnasium, additional classrooms at the elementary and a new lunchroom were constructed. During 1969–70, fire destroyed the home economics and agri-science buildings. In 1971, a new agriscience building was constructed, adding all new tools in excess of $10,000.00. In 1973, a new concession stand and press box were constructed in the football stadium. A new wing was added to the elementary school in 1974 and the first Special Education Class was begun in 1973. In January 1976, construction was completed on a new building which housed the library and home economics department.

The National Honor Society was established in 1991. In 1997, a new elementary gymnasium was completed and in 1999 a 2.1 million dollar high school gymnasium was completed. Four new classrooms were built in the old auditorium in 1999 allowing the sixth grade to move out of the elementary building.

In 2010, construction was completed for the new Corner High School located in the Bagley community. That building is a two-story structure made primary of brick and masonry stones. The front entrance includes an eight columned portico with a blue domed cupola adorning the roof just behind the portico.

In the 2016–2017 school year, what was Corner School and Bagley School merged, creating Bagley Elementary School (K-4) and Corner Middle School (5–8).

== Student profile ==
Enrollment in grades 9–12 for the 2013–14 school year is 521 students. Approximately 99% are white and 1% are Hispanic. Roughly 30% of students qualify for free or reduced price lunch.

CHS has a graduation rate of 95%. Approximately 87% of its students meet or exceed state proficiency standards in mathematics, and 95% meet or exceed standards in reading. The average ACT score for CHS students is 24.

== Athletics ==
Today, CHS competes in AHSAA Class 5A athletics and fields teams in the following sports:

- Baseball
- Basketball
- Bowling
- Cheerleading
- Cross Country
- Football
- Golf
- Indoor Track & Field
- Outdoor Track & Field
- Softball
- Tennis
- Volleyball
- Wrestling
- Marching band

CHS won state championships in boys' basketball in 1949 and 1954. The current basketball coach is Billy Conner. He has won over 500 games in his 27-year tenure, and has had at least 16 players go on to play college basketball. The CHS football team won regional championships in 1986 and 1987. The school fielded its first football team in 1946. But they did not win their first game until November 18, 1949, in their fourth season with a victory over Hayden High School by a score of 40–0. The 1956 squad went 8–1–1 outscoring opponents 270–70 and giving up only three scores in their last six games. The longest serving head football coach in school history was Marvin Rice. He served from 1955 to 1973 and compiled a record of 71–102–9 in 18 seasons. Corner's longest football rivalry is with Oak Grove High School. Corner leads the series 35–32–1. Corner Football has made 11 appearances in the Alabama State High School Playoffs (1986–87, 1991, 1995, 2000–02, 2006, 2011, 2012, 2016, 2017). Corner High School is 1–10 in the football state playoffs.

== Notable alumni ==
- Earl Hawkins (1920–2005), professional basketball player in the National Basketball League during the 1940s
- Rex Frederick (b. 1936), attended Auburn University where he is one of only 6 Auburn Basketball players to have his jersey (#32) retired.
