= The American Cotton Planter and the Soil of the South =

American monthly magazine (1857–1861)

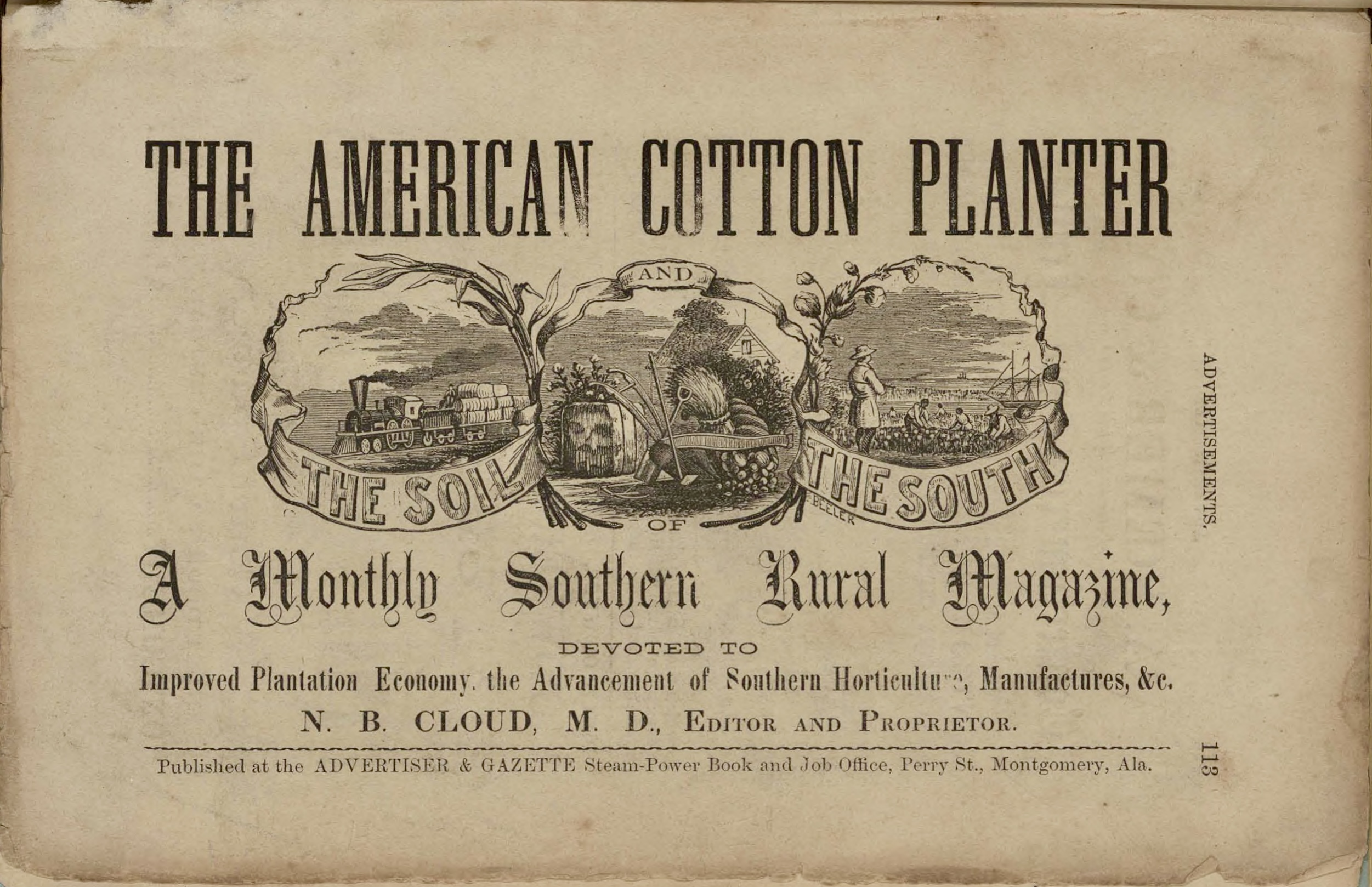
Advertisement placed in the 1859 Montgomery Alabama city directory for The American Cotton Planter and the Soil of the South Monthly a "Southern Rural Magazine"

The American Cotton Planter and Soil of the South was an American monthly magazine for slave-owning American planters. It was the result of the 1857 merger of the periodicals The American Cotton Planter and The Soil of the South. It was published in Montgomery, Alabama, at the printing offices of the Montgomery Advertiser. The editor and publisher was Dr. N. B. Cloud.

Topics covered in the magazine included soil erosion and the "impudence of the negroes". Other topics included race purity as a factor in optimizing slave selection, perceived sleep habits of the slave, the value of the pea as a foodstuff for slaves, and how to resolve the problem of soil exhaustion. Historian Walter Johnson describes The American Cotton Planter and similar works as "a set of extended efforts to translate a practical knowledge that was most readily obtained by the field hands (and thus expropriated from them) into a set of visual terms—letters, words, charts, illustrations—which could be consumed through their owners' eyes".

The predecessor publications, the American Cotton Planter and The Soil of the South ran from 1853 to 1856, and 1851 to 1857, respectively. The American Cotton Planter and the Soil of the South ceased publication in 1861.
