= Alabama State Department of Education =

Education agency of the State of Alabama

Alabama Department of Education
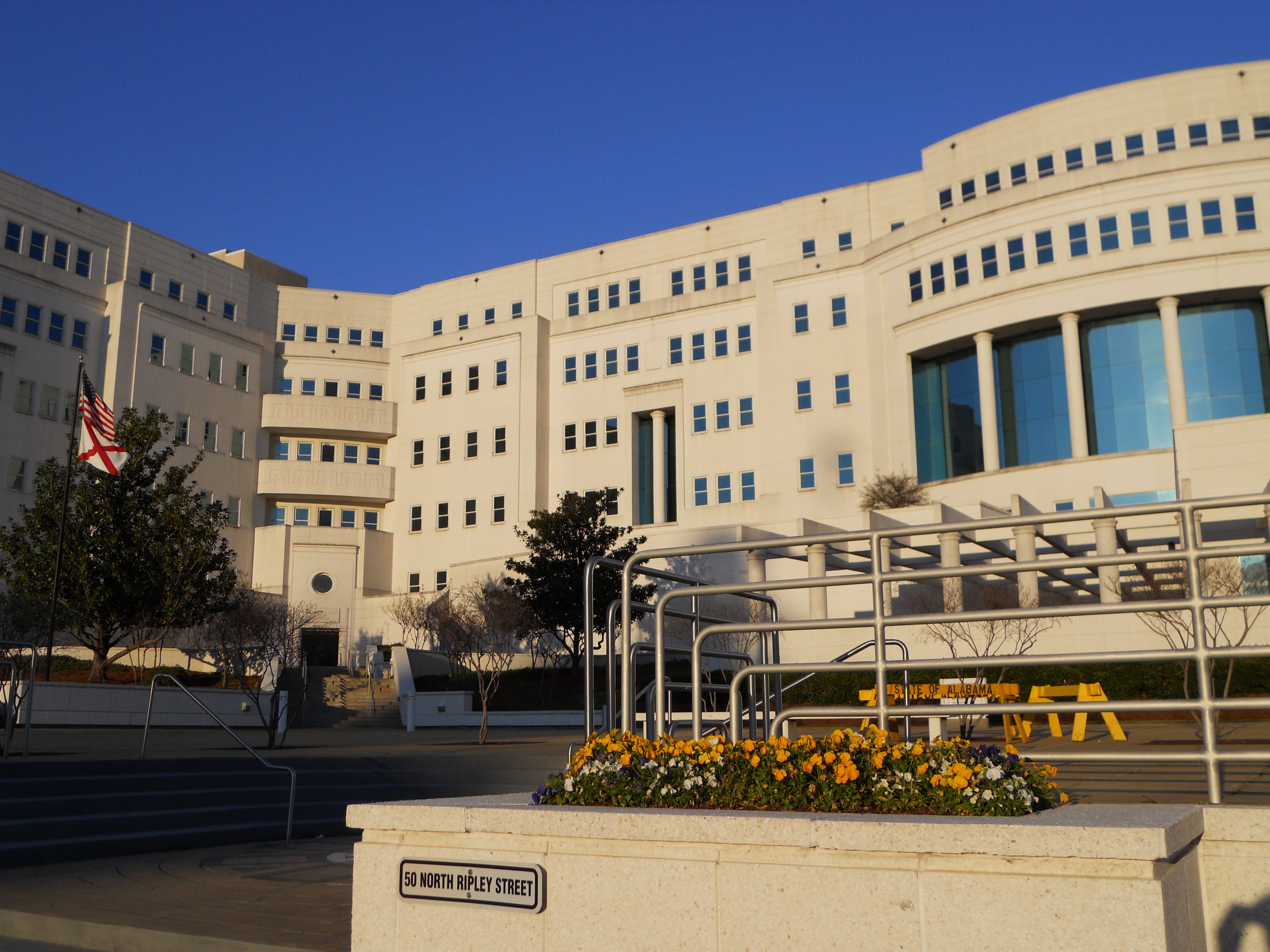
- The Alabama State Department of Education headquarters in Montgomery, Alabama

Agency overview
- Formed: 1854
- Type: State education agency
- Headquarters: 50 North Ripley Street, Montgomery, Alabama; 32°22′43″N 86°17′51″W
- Agency executive: Eric G. Mackey, State Superintendent of Education
- Website: www.alabamaachieves.org

The Alabama State Department of Education (ALSDE) is the state education agency of Alabama. It is headquartered at 50 North Ripley Street in Montgomery. The department was formed by the Alabama Legislature in 1854. The department serves over 740,000 students in 136 school systems.

Eric G. Mackey, Ed.D. was appointed as Alabama State Superintendent in May 2018 and is the current agency head.

== State Superintendents of Education ==
Noah B. Cloud was Alabama's first state superintendent of public education. He served after the American Civil War during the Reconstruction era and later served in the Alabama House of Representatives. He was a doctor.

Other people who have held the office include Ed Richardson, Joseph Morton, Michael Sentance, Philip Cleveland, and Tommy Bice.

Seven members of the School Superintendents of Alabama organization have served in the role beginning with J.A. Keller and E. B. Norton. Leroy Brown, fourth is Dr. Wayne Teague, who was superintendent of Auburn City Schools when he was appointed State Superintendent. He held the office longer than any other state superintendent in the country at that time. Ed Richardson, Joe Morton, and Eric Mackey also held both roles during their careers.

Eric G. Mackey was appointed Alabama State Superintendent in May 2018 and is the current agency head.

== See also ==
- Alabama State Board of Education
- Alabama Superintendent of Education
- Council of Chief State School Officials
