= Noah B. Cloud =

American politician

Noah Bartlett Cloud

Alabama House of Representatives
- In office 1873–1873

Alabama Superintendent of Public Instruction
- In office 1865–1873

Personal details
- Born: January 26, 1809 Edgefield District, South Carolina, U.S.
- Died: November 5, 1875 (aged 66) Montgomery, Montgomery County, Alabama, U.S.
- Education: Jefferson Medical College
- Occupation: State superintendent of education, educator, surgeon, politician
- Nickname: N. B. Cloud

Noah Bartlett Cloud (January 26, 1809 – November 5, 1875) was an American state superintendent of education, educator, surgeon, and politician. He served as Superintendent of Public Instruction in Alabama, heading organization of public schools in the state after the American Civil War. As Alabama School Superintendent he sought to establish a public school system in Alabama for both white and black students. He was labeled a "scalawag" by Southerners. He served as a state representative for Montgomery County, Alabama, in 1873 in the Alabama House of Representatives.

== Early life ==
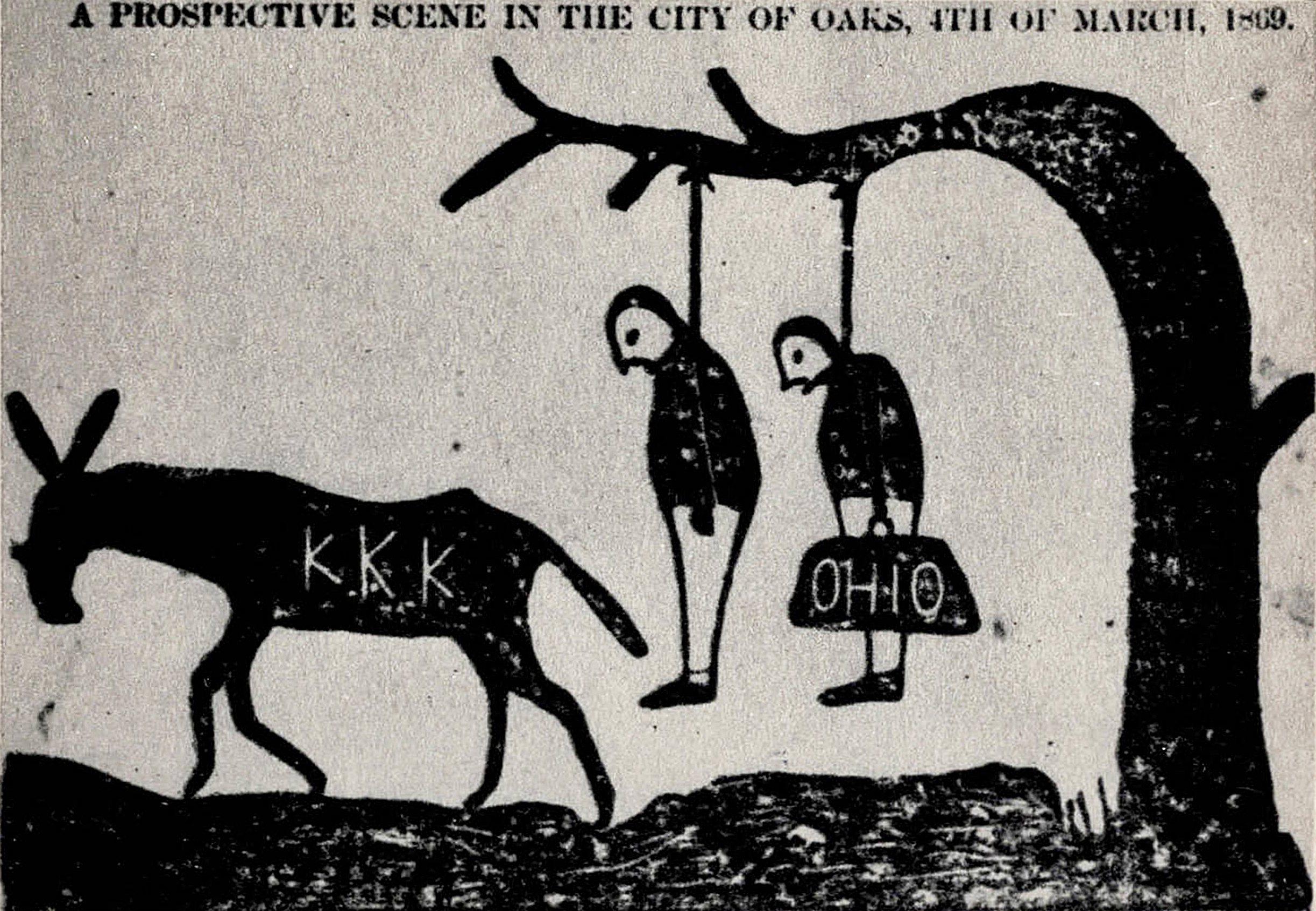
Cartoon from September 1, 1868, published in the Tuscaloosa Independent Monitor. Lakin ("Ohio") and Cloud were the subject's hanging from the tree

Noah B. Cloud was born on January 26, 1809, in Edgefield District (now Edgefield County), South Carolina. He graduated from Jefferson Medical College in Pennsylvania in 1835.

== Career ==
Cloud was a member of the Whig Party, the Union Party, and then a Republican. He moved to Macon County, Alabama in 1838.

Cloud served as a surgeon in the Confederate States Army during the American Civil War (1861–1865). After the war he was appointed the first to be Alabama's "Superintendent of Public Instruction" (now Alabama State Superintendent of Education) for the Alabama State Department of Education. On September 1, 1868, Cloud and University of Alabama's president Arad Simon Lakin were the subject's of a Klan cartoon published in the Tuscaloosa Independent Monitor (see image). The cartoon featured images of the two educators lynched and hanging from a tree in the "City of Oaks" (or Tuscaloosa), with a KKK-labeled donkey below them, walking away.

Cloud edited the Cotton Planter magazine (later known as The American Cotton Planter and Soil of the South). He married Mary M. Barton. He had a farm on Uchee Creek in Russell County, Alabama.

Some of Cloud's correspondence as superintendent of education are extant.
