= Kimberly, Alabama =

City in Alabama, United States

- City
- Logo

- Location of Kimberly in Jefferson County, Alabama.
- Coordinates: 33°46′16″N 86°47′43″W
- Country: United States
- State: Alabama
- County: Jefferson

Area
  - Total: 5.86 sq mi (15.18 km^{2})
  - Land: 5.86 sq mi (15.18 km^{2})
  - Water: 0 sq mi (0.00 km^{2})
- Elevation: 472 ft (144 m)

Population (2020)
  - Total: 3,841
  - Density: 660/sq mi (253/km^{2})
- Time zone: UTC-6 (Central (CST))
  - Summer (DST): UTC-5 (CDT)
- ZIP code: 35091
- Area codes: 205 & 659
- FIPS code: 01-39856
- GNIS feature ID: 2405948
- Website: kimberlyal.gov

Kimberly is a city in Jefferson County, Alabama, United States. At the 2020 census, the population was 3,841.

== History ==
The city of Kimberly developed around a stagecoach station built in the 1830s; it remained in service until 1865. At this time, the settlement was known as Kennelsville. The city then became known as Jefferson, probably after the nearby Old Jefferson coal mine, until the late 1880s. In 1888, the town's post office was relocated to nearby Morris. In 1905, the town voted to change its name to Kimberly because another Alabama town had already claimed the name Jefferson. The town had a population of around 900 by 1910. Local coal mines were primary employers in Kimberly and were active through the 1940s, gradually closing down during the 1950s. Another significant employer in Kimberly was the Dixie Firebrick Company, founded in the 1930s; it was later bought out by A.P. Green Refractories Company. This facility shut down sometime in the mid-1970s. The city officially incorporated in 1952. Many city records and history were lost in a fire at the city hall in 1989. Beginning June 29, 2011, due to the population increasing from 1,801 persons in 2000 to 2,711 in 2010, the town began operating as a city, per Alabama law.

== Geography ==
According to the U.S. Census Bureau, the city has a total area of 4.0 square miles (10 km^{2}), all land.

== Demographics ==
Historical population
Census	Pop.	Note	%±
1960	763		—
1970	847		11.0%
1980	1,043		23.1%
1990	1,096		5.1%
2000	1,801		64.3%
2010	2,711		50.5%
2020	3,841		41.7%
U.S. Decennial Census; 2013 Estimate

=== Racial and ethnic composition ===
Kimberly city, Alabama – Racial and ethnic composition Note: the US Census treats Hispanic/Latino as an ethnic category. This table excludes Latinos from the racial categories and assigns them to a separate category. Hispanics/Latinos may be of any race.
Race / Ethnicity (NH = Non-Hispanic)	Pop 2000	Pop 2010	Pop 2020	% 2000	% 2010	% 2020
White alone (NH)	1,709	2,595	3,386	94.89%	95.72%	88.15%
Black or African American alone (NH)	29	49	234	1.61%	1.81%	6.09%
Native American or Alaska Native alone (NH)	11	12	4	0.61%	0.44%	0.10%
Asian alone (NH)	3	16	7	0.17%	0.59%	0.18%
Native Hawaiian or Pacific Islander alone (NH)	0	0	0	0.00%	0.00%	0.00%
Other race alone (NH)	4	0	1	0.22%	0.00%	0.03%
Mixed race or Multiracial (NH)	24	17	138	1.33%	0.63%	3.59%
Hispanic or Latino (any race)	21	22	71	1.17%	0.81%	1.85%
Total	1,801	2,711	3,841	100.00%	100.00%	100.00%

=== 2020 census ===
As of the 2020 census, Kimberly had a population of 3,841. The median age was 37.5 years. 27.8% of residents were under the age of 18 and 11.8% of residents were 65 years of age or older. For every 100 females there were 93.0 males, and for every 100 females age 18 and over there were 92.9 males age 18 and over.

0.0% of residents lived in urban areas, while 100.0% lived in rural areas.

There were 1,355 households in Kimberly, of which 42.7% had children under the age of 18 living in them. Of all households, 65.5% were married-couple households, 12.0% were households with a male householder and no spouse or partner present, and 19.7% were households with a female householder and no spouse or partner present. About 19.8% of all households were made up of individuals and 9.4% had someone living alone who was 65 years of age or older. There were 947 families residing in the city.

There were 1,431 housing units, of which 5.3% were vacant. The homeowner vacancy rate was 2.0% and the rental vacancy rate was 17.0%.

Racial composition as of the 2020 census
Race	Number	Percent
White	3,395	88.4%
Black or African American	235	6.1%
American Indian and Alaska Native	5	0.1%
Asian	8	0.2%
Native Hawaiian and Other Pacific Islander	0	0.0%
Some other race	23	0.6%
Two or more races	175	4.6%
Hispanic or Latino (of any race)	71	1.8%

=== 2010 census ===
At the 2010 census there were 2,711 people, 932 households, and 752 families living in the city. The population density was 677.5 inhabitants per square mile (261.6/km^{2}). There were 1,002 housing units at an average density of 250.5 per square mile (96.7/km^{2}). The racial makeup of the city was 96.2% White, 1.8% Black or African American, 0.4% Native American, 0.6% Asian, 0.3% from other races, and .7% from two or more races. .8% of the population were Hispanic or Latino of any race. Of the 932 households 41.7% had children under the age of 18 living with them, 67.0% were married couples living together, 10.2% had a female householder with no husband present, and 19.3% were non-families. 16.8% of households were one person and 6.8% were one person aged 65 or older. The average household size was 2.91 and the average family size was 3.28.

The age distribution was 28.7% under the age of 18, 8.0% from 18 to 24, 29.0% from 25 to 44, 25.4% from 45 to 64, and 9.0% 65 or older. The median age was 35.4 years. For every 100 females, there were 94.9 males. For every 100 females age 18 and over, there were 96.9 males.

=== 2000 census ===
At the 2000 census there were 1,801 people, 652 households, and 528 families living in the town. The population density was 447.8 inhabitants per square mile (172.9/km^{2}). There were 699 housing units at an average density of 173.8 per square mile (67.1/km^{2}). The racial makeup of the town was 95.78% White, 1.61% Black or African American, 0.61% Native American, 0.17% Asian, 0.44% from other races, and 1.39% from two or more races. 1.17% of the population were Hispanic or Latino of any race. Of the 652 households 42.2% had children under the age of 18 living with them, 68.3% were married couples living together, 9.5% had a female householder with no husband present, and 18.9% were non-families. 17.0% of households were one person and 8.4% were one person aged 65 or older. The average household size was 2.76 and the average family size was 3.11.

The age distribution was 29.3% under the age of 18, 6.7% from 18 to 24, 33.1% from 25 to 44, 20.5% from 45 to 64, and 10.5% 65 or older. The median age was 34 years. For every 100 females, there were 99.4 males. For every 100 females age 18 and over, there were 91.6 males.

The median household income was $46,343 and the median family income was $52,109. Males had a median income of $36,977 versus $29,150 for females. The per capita income for the town was $17,055. About 6.7% of families and 7.7% of the population were below the poverty line, including 9.6% of those under age 18 and 15.8% of those age 65 or over.

== Government ==
Elected Officials

- Mayor - Richard Dixon
- Council Member/Mayor Pro Tem - Tanya Cowart
- Council Member - Chris Cassidy
- Council Member-James Harris
- Council Member - Richard Dixon
- Council Member - Andrew Mahaffey

Department Heads

- City Clerk - Duane Whatley
- Police Chief - Ron Sellers
- Fire Chief - Brendt Wood
- Streets and Parks Director - Chip Dearman

== Education ==
- Bryan Elementary School
- North Jefferson Middle School
- Mortimer Jordan High School

All three schools are located in Kimberly, with North Jefferson Middle and Mortimer Jordan serving a feeder pattern consisting of Kimberly, Warrior, Morris, Trafford and several areas of extreme north Gardendale.
