= Alabama High School Athletic Association =

American athletics government body

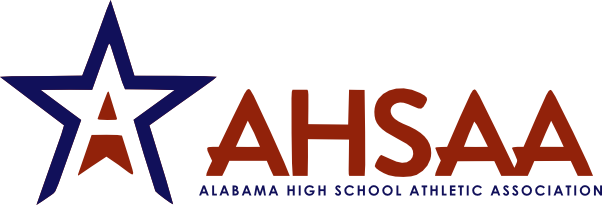

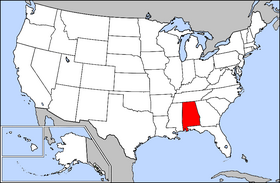
- Abbreviation: AHSAA
- Formation: 1921
- Type: 501(c)(3) - Tax Exemption
- Legal status: Association
- Purpose: Athletic/Educational
- Headquarters: 7325 Halcyon Summit Dr. Montgomery, Alabama 36117
- Region served: Alabama
- Members: 401 senior high schools; 287 junior high schools
- Executive Director: Heath Harmon
- Affiliations: National Federation of State High School Associations
- Staff: 13
- Website: ahsaa.com
- Remarks: (334) 263-6994

The Alabama High School Athletic Association (AHSAA), based in Montgomery, is the governing body for interscholastic athletics and activities programs for public schools in the U.S. state of Alabama. The AHSAA is a member National Federation of State High School Associations since 1924. The AHSAA merged with the Alabama Interscholastic Athletic Association (AIAA) in 1968, forming one high school athletic association for Alabama in accordance with a court order relating to athletics. The AIAA had previously governed athletics at segregated African-American schools.

The AHSAA sponsors state championship programs in 13 boys and 14 girls sports: Baseball, Softball, Basketball, Football, Flag Football, Cross Country, Golf, Soccer, Bowling, Swimming and Diving, Track and Field, Tennis, Volleyball, Wrestling, Esports, Cheerleading and Indoor Track.

While the AHSAA is the primary sanctioning organization for high school sports in Alabama (and the only one allowed for public schools), it is not the only such organization. The Alabama Independent School Association sanctions athletics for approximately 40 private schools throughout the state. Other smaller organizations, such as the Alabama Christian Sports Conference and the Alabama Christian Athletic and Academic Association, sanction sports from smaller Christian schools and home schools, particularly in eight-man football.

The current executive director is Heath Harmon.

== Championship locations ==
The AHSAA sponsors state championship events in various locations across the state of Alabama. Currently, championships are held in the following locations:

- Football ("Super 7") alternates in a three stadium rotation between Protective Stadium in Birmingham, Bryant–Denny Stadium in Tuscaloosa, and Jordan–Hare Stadium in Auburn
- Basketball – Legacy Arena, Birmingham
- Baseball – Paterson Field & Riverwalk Stadium, Montgomery
- Cross Country – Oakville Indian Mounds, Lawrence County
- Indoor Track and Field – Birmingham CrossPlex, Birmingham
- Softball – Lagoon Park, Montgomery
- Soccer – John Hunt Park, Huntsville
- Swimming – James E. Martin Aquatics Center, Auburn
- Tennis – Decatur, Mobile, and Montgomery
- Outdoor Track and Field – Gulf Shores
- Volleyball – Birmingham CrossPlex, Birmingham
- Wrestling – Von Braun Center, Huntsville (traditional tournament); Bill Harris Arena at the Birmingham CrossPlex, Birmingham (dual team tournament)
- Cheerleading – Wallace State Community College, Hanceville

== History ==
The Alabama High School Athletic Association (AHSAA) was founded in 1921. Charter member schools were:

- Abbeville
- Albany
- Aliceville
- Andalusia
- Auburn
- Baldwin County
- Barton Academy
- Bessemer City
- Bibb County
- Buhl
- Carrollton
- Chambers County
- Charles Henderson
- Chilton County
- Clio
- Coffeeville
- Colbert County
- Conecuh County
- Cullman
- Dadeville
- Demopolis
- Dothan
- Elmore County
- Enterprise
- Escambia County
- Evergreen
- Fayette County
- Geneva County
- Georgiana
- Gordo
- Greensboro
- Greenville
- Guntersville
- Hackleburg
- Hamilton
- Headland
- Highland Home
- Jackson
- Lamar County
- Lauderdale County
- Lincoln
- Lowndes County
- Marbury
- Marengo County
- Marion County
- Monroe County
- Mortimer Jordan
- Munford
- New Brockton
- Notasulga
- Oneonta
- Opelika
- Oxford
- Palmetto School
- Pell City
- Phillips (Birmingham)
- Pickens County
- Pike Road
- Prattville
- Ramer
- Russellville
- Selma
- Shelby County
- Sidney Lanier
- Simpson
- Spring Hill
- Springville
- St. Clair County
- Sylacauga
- Tarrant
- Thomasville
- Tuskegee
- UMS-Wright
- Uniontown
- Valley
- Wagarville
- Walker
- Winston County

(Italicized schools indicate schools which have closed or are no longer members of the AHSAA.)

=== AIAA ===
The Alabama Interscholastic Athletic Association (AIAA) schools included:

- Tuscaloosa County Training School
- Blount
- Carver Birmingham
- Carver Montgomery
- East Highland
- Jackson-Olin
- Keith
- LeFlore
- Parker
- R.C. Hatch
- Talladega County Central
- Wenonah
- Williamson

Tuscaloosa County Training, which became Riverside, won 40 games, had no losses, and one tie between 1947 and 1952.

== See also ==
- List of Alabama High School Athletic Association championships
- NFHS
