= 2019 Maryland Terrapins football team =

American college football season

2019 Maryland Terrapins football
- Conference: Big Ten Conference
- East Division
- Record: 3–9 (1–8 Big Ten)
- Head coach: Mike Locksley (1st season)
- Offensive coordinator: Scottie Montgomery (1st season)
- Offensive scheme: Spread option
- Defensive coordinator: Jon Hoke (1st season)
- Base defense: 3–4
- Home stadium: Byrd Stadium

Uniform
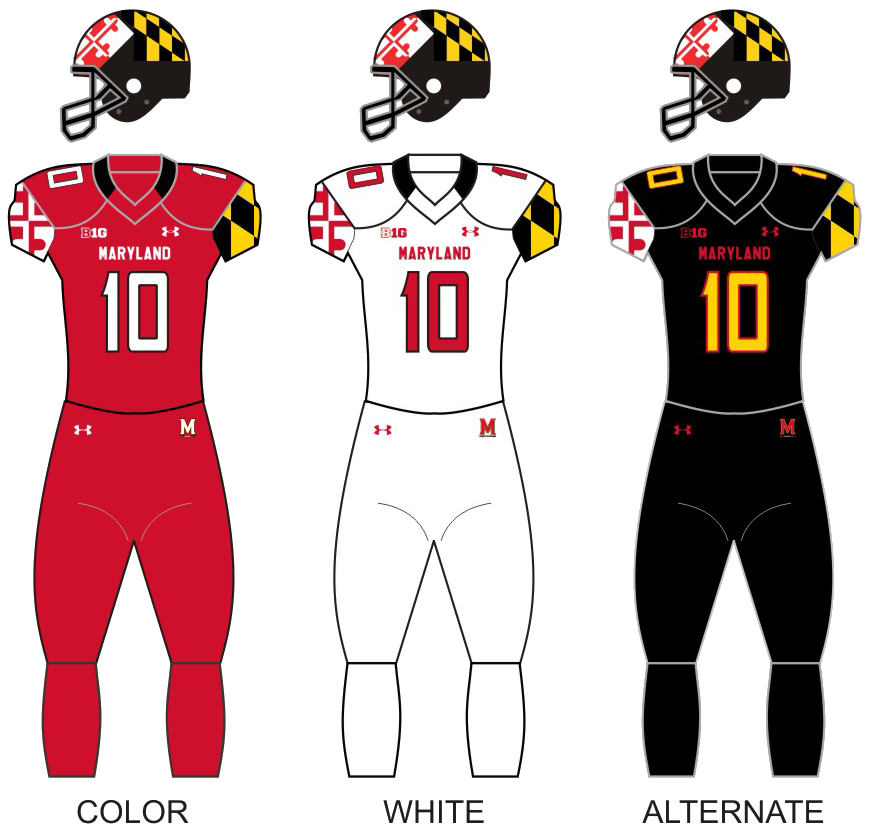

2019 Big Ten Conference football standings
	Conf.			Overall
Team	W		L	W		L
East Division
No. 3 Ohio State xy$^	9	–	0	13	–	1
No. 9 Penn State	7	–	2	11	–	2
No. 18 Michigan	6	–	3	9	–	4
Indiana	5	–	4	8	–	5
Michigan State	4	–	5	7	–	6
Maryland	1	–	8	3	–	9
Rutgers	0	–	9	2	–	10
West Division
No. 11 Wisconsin xy	7	–	2	10	–	4
No. 10 Minnesota x	7	–	2	11	–	2
No. 15 Iowa	6	–	3	10	–	3
Illinois	4	–	5	6	–	7
Purdue	3	–	6	4	–	8
Nebraska	3	–	6	5	–	7
Northwestern	1	–	8	3	–	9
Championship: Ohio State 34, Wisconsin 21
^ – College Football Playoff participant; $ – Conference champion; x – Division champion/co-champions; y – Championship game participant; Rankings from AP Poll

The 2019 Maryland Terrapins football team represented the University of Maryland, College Park in the 2019 NCAA Division I FBS football season. The Terrapins played their home games at Maryland Stadium in College Park, Maryland and competed in the East Division of the Big Ten Conference. They finished the season 3–9, 1–8 in Big Ten play to finish in sixth place in the East Division.

== Offseason ==
=== Spring game ===
Maryland held its annual Red-White spring exhibition game on April 27, 2019. The Red team, led by redshirt junior quarterback and game MVP Tyler DeSue, triumphed over the White team 28–17.

=== Recruiting ===
College recruiting (2019)
Name	Hometown	School	Height	Weight	Commit date
Cortez Andrews; OLB	Tallahassee, FL	Godby High School	5 ft 11.5 in (1.82 m)	217 lb (98 kg)	Feb 6, 2019
Cortez Andrews; OLB	Recruit ratings: Rivals: 247Sports: ESPN: (80)				
Deonte Banks; CB	Edgewood, MD	Edgewood High School	6 ft 1 in (1.85 m)	190 lb (86 kg)	Jun 22, 2018
Deonte Banks; CB	Recruit ratings: Rivals: 247Sports: ESPN: (79)				
Kameron Blount; OLB	Waldorf, MD	Saint Charles High School	6 ft 2 in (1.88 m)	216 lb (98 kg)	Apr 1, 2018
Kameron Blount; OLB	Recruit ratings: Rivals: 247Sports: ESPN: (78)				
Anthony Booker; DL	Cincinnati, OH	Winton Woods High School	6 ft 5 in (1.96 m)	280 lb (130 kg)	Feb 5, 2019
Anthony Booker; DL	Recruit ratings: Rivals: 247Sports: ESPN: (75)				
Erwin Byrd; DB	Powder Springs, GA	McEachern High School	6 ft 0 in (1.83 m)	175 lb (79 kg)	Jan 27, 2019
Erwin Byrd; DB	Recruit ratings: Rivals: 247Sports: ESPN: (73)				
TreRon Collins; DB	Fairburn, GA	Langston Hughes High School	6 ft 2 in (1.88 m)	190 lb (86 kg)	Jan 27, 2019
TreRon Collins; DB	Recruit ratings: Rivals: 247Sports: ESPN: (80)				
Nick Cross; DB	Hyattsville, MD	DeMatha Catholic High School	6 ft 0 in (1.83 m)	206 lb (93 kg)	Feb 12, 2019
Nick Cross; DB	Recruit ratings: Rivals: 247Sports: ESPN: (84)				
Tyler Devera; TE	Oradell, NJ	Bergen Catholic High	6 ft 4 in (1.93 m)	227 lb (103 kg)	Feb 3, 2019
Tyler Devera; TE	Recruit ratings: Rivals: 247Sports: ESPN: (74)				
Marcus Finger; OL	Fort Myers, FL	Fort Myers High School	6 ft 5 in (1.96 m)	296 lb (134 kg)	Feb 4, 2019
Marcus Finger; OL	Recruit ratings: Rivals: 247Sports: ESPN: (71)				
Lavonte Gater; DB	Washington, DC	Frank W. Ballou High School	5 ft 11 in (1.80 m)	160 lb (73 kg)	Feb 21, 2018
Lavonte Gater; DB	Recruit ratings: Rivals: 247Sports: ESPN: (73)				
Isaiah Hazel; WR	Upper Marlboro, MD	Dr. Henry A. Wise, Jr. High School	6 ft 1 in (1.85 m)	190 lb (86 kg)	Dec 12, 2018
Isaiah Hazel; WR	Recruit ratings: Rivals: 247Sports: ESPN: (83)				
Parris Heath; OL	Brooklyn, NY	ASA College	6 ft 4 in (1.93 m)	325 lb (147 kg)	Feb 3, 2019
Parris Heath; OL	Recruit ratings: Rivals: 247Sports: ESPN: (N/A)				
Deshawn Holt; DL	Waldorf, MD	Westlake High School	6 ft 5 in (1.96 m)	220 lb (100 kg)	Jun 25, 2018
Deshawn Holt; DL	Recruit ratings: Rivals: 247Sports: ESPN: (79)				
Malik Jackson; TE	Fort Meade, MD	Meade High School	6 ft 4 in (1.93 m)	225 lb (102 kg)	Dec 19, 2018
Malik Jackson; TE	Recruit ratings: Rivals: 247Sports: ESPN: (73)				
Lance Legendre; QB	New Orleans, LA	Warren Easton High School	6 ft 2 in (1.88 m)	205 lb (93 kg)	Feb 6, 2019
Lance Legendre; QB	Recruit ratings: Rivals: 247Sports: ESPN: (82)				
Mason Lunsford; OL	Olney, MD	Our Lady of Good Counsel High School	6 ft 5 in (1.96 m)	305 lb (138 kg)	Dec 14, 2018
Mason Lunsford; OL	Recruit ratings: Rivals: 247Sports: ESPN: (74)				
Sam Okuayinonu; DL	Lowell, MA	Mesabi Range Comm & Tech College	6 ft 3 in (1.91 m)	270 lb (120 kg)	Jan 26, 2019
Sam Okuayinonu; DL	Recruit ratings: Rivals: 247Sports: ESPN: (76)				
Dino Tomlin; WR	Pittsburgh, PA	Shady Side Academy	6 ft 0 in (1.83 m)	165 lb (75 kg)	Nov 6, 2018
Dino Tomlin; WR	Recruit ratings: Rivals: 247Sports: ESPN: (76)				
Overall recruit ranking: 247Sports: 46
Note: In many cases, Scout, Rivals, 247Sports, On3, and ESPN may conflict in their listings of height and weight.; In these cases, the average was taken. ESPN grades are on a 100-point scale.; Sources: "2019 Team Ranking". Rivals.com.

=== Transfers ===
Name	Pos.	Height	Weight	Class	Hometown	College transferred from
DeJuan Ellis	WR	5'11"	178	Freshman	Accokeek, Md	Virginia Tech
Josh Jackson	QB	6'1"	215	Junior	Saline, MI	Virginia Tech
Keandre Jones	OLB	6'3"	210	Senior	Olney, Md	Ohio State
Tyler Mabry	TE	6'3"	265	Senior	Ypsilanti, MI	University at Buffalo
Sean Savoy	WR	5'9"	177	Junior	Washington, D.C.	Virginia Tech
Shaq Smith	OLB	6'2"	256	Junior	Baltimore, MD	Clemson University

=== Preseason Big Ten poll ===
Although the Big Ten Conference has not held an official preseason poll since 2010, Cleveland.com has polled sports journalists representing all member schools as a de facto preseason media poll since 2011. For the 2019 poll, Maryland was projected to finish in sixth in the East Division.

=== Award watch lists ===
Award	Player	Position	Year
Bednarik Award	Antoine Brooks	DB	SR
Maxwell Award	Anthony McFarland Jr.	RB	SO
Doak Walker Award	Anthony McFarland Jr.	RB	SO
John Mackey Award	Tyler Mabry	TE	GS
Rimington Trophy	Johnny Jordan	C	JR
Paul Hornung Award	Javon Leake	RB	JR
Wuerffel Trophy	Noah Barnes	TE	JR

== Personnel ==
=== Roster ===
2019 Maryland Terrapins football team roster
Players
Coaches
Offense

Pos.	#	Name	Class
WR	1	D. J. Turner	Sr
RB	2	Lorenzo Harrison III	Jr
QB	3	Tyrrell Pigrome	Jr
QB	4	Lance Legendre	Fr
RB	5	Anthony McFarland Jr.	So
WR	6	Jeshaun Jones (injured)	So
WR	7	Dontay Demus Jr.	So
RB	8	Tayon Fleet-Davis	Jr
TE	9	Chig Okonkwo	So
WR	10	Jayden Comma	So
QB	11	Donny Sanders	So
QB	13	Tyler Desue	Fr
WR	13	Rayshad Lewis	Jr
WR	15	Brian Cobbs	So
WR	16	Dino Tomlin	Fr
QB	17	Josh Jackson	Jr
QB	18	Max Bortenschlager (injured)	Jr
WR	19	MJ Jarrell	So
RB	20	Javon Leake	Jr
WR	21	Darryl Jones	So
QB	22	Eric Najarian	Fr
WR	26	Justin Brown	So
WR	29	Sean Savoy
FB	32	Antonio Dicerbo	Jr
RB	34	Jake Funk	Jr
TE	45	Zack Roski	Jr
TE	46	Robert Schwob	Jr
OL	52	Evan Gregory	Fr
OL	54	Spencer Anderson	Fr
OL	55	Austin Fontaine	Fr
OL	57	TJ Bradley	Jr
OL	61	Breyon Gaddy	So
OL	63	Tyler Hamilton	Jr
OL	64	Marcus Finger	Fr
OL	67	Tyran Hunt	So
OL	68	Ellis McKennie	Sr
OL	69	Parris Heath	So
OL	70	Sean Christie	Sr
OL	71	Jaelyn Duncan	Fr
OL	72	Marcus Minor	So
OL	73	Johnny Jordan	Jr
OL	75	Terrance Davis	Sr
OL	76	Jack Wagman	Jr
OL	78	Mason Lunsford	Fr
TE	80	Noah Barnes	Jr
TE	81	Tyler Mabry	Sr
WR	82	Isaiah Hazel	Fr
WR	83	Carlos Carriere	So
WR	84	Chris Jones	Sr
WR	85	Sean Nelson	So
TE	86	Malik Jackson	Fr
TE	87	Tyler Devera	Fr

Defense

Pos.	#	Name	Class
DB	3	Nick Cross	Fr
LB	4	Keandre Jones	Sr
LB	5	Shaq Smith	Jr
DB	7	Tino Ellis	Sr
DB	8	Marcus Lewis	Sr
DL	10	Tyler Baylor	Fr
DB	11	Fofie Bazzie	So
DB	12	Vincent Flythe	Fr
DB	14	Deon Jones	So
LB	16	Ayinde Eley	So
DB	17	Treron Collins	Fr
LB	18	Jordan Mosley	So
LB	19	Ahmad McCullough	Fr
DB	20	Antwaine Richardson (injured)	Sr
LB	22	Isaiah Davis	Sr
DB	23	Fa'Najae Gotay	Fr
DB	24	Kenny Bennett	So
DB	25	Antoine Brooks	Sr
DB	26	Erwin Byrd	Fr
DL	27	Bryce Brand	Jr
LB	30	Durell Nchami (injured)	So
DB	31	Tahj Capehart	So
LB	32	Bruce Miller	Sr
DB	33	Deonte Banks	Fr
LB	35	Kobi Thomas	Fr
LB	36	Cortez Andrews	Fr
DB	37	Lavonte Gater	Fr
DB	38	Kareem Montgomery	Sr
LB	39	Deshawn Holt	Fr
LB	40	Tanyi Makia	So
LB	42	Kameron Blount	Fr
LB	43	Wyatt Cook	Sr
LB	44	Chance Campbell	So
LB	48	Oladimeji Olayinka	So
LB	49	David Brownlee	So
DL	51	Jacob Purcell	Sr
DL	52	Oluwaseun Oluwatimi	Sr
LB	53	Sean Greely	Fr
DL	59	Keiron Howard	Sr
DL	77	Cherokee Glasgow	So
DL	88	Jalen Alexander	Fr
DL	89	Anthony Booker Jr.	Fr
DL	90	B'Ahmad Miller	So
DL	95	Lawtez Rogers	So
DL	96	Brett Kulka	Sr
DL	97	Sam Okuayinonu	Jr
DL	98	Brandon Gaddy	So

Special teams

Pos.	#	Name	Class
K	27	Joseph Petrino	So
K	38	Paul Inzerillo	Jr
K	41	Mike Shinsky	Sr
LS	47	James Rosenberry	So
LS	58	Paul Mouring	Fr
K	97	Bentley Faulkner	So
P	98	Anthony Pecorella	Fr
P	99	Colton Spangler	Fr

Head coach

- Mike Locksley

Coordinators/assistant coaches

- Scottie Montgomery (Offensive Coordinator / Quarterbacks)
- Jon Hoke (Defensive Coordinator / Safeties)
- John Papuchis (Special Teams Coordinator/ Inside Linebackers)
- Joker Phillips (Co-Offensive Coordinator / Wide Receivers)
- John Reagan (Offensive Line)
- Delbert Cowsette (Defensive Line)
- Cory Robinson (Defensive Passing game Coordinator / Cornerbacks)
- Brian Williams (Outside Linebackers)
- Elijah Brooks (Running Backs)
- Mike Miller (Tight Ends)
- Ryan Davis (Director of Football Strength and Conditioning)
- Matthew Fyle (Associate Director of Football Strength and Conditioning)
- Ron Zook (Senior Analyst)
- Brawley Evans (Senior Defensive Analyst)

Legend

- (C) Team captain
- (S) Suspended
- (I) Ineligible
- Injured
- Redshirt

Roster

=== Depth chart ===
Defense

FS
Antoine Brooks
Deon Jones
Nick Cross

JACK	WILL	MIKE	SAM
Shaq Smith	Ayinde Eley	Chance Campbell	Keandre Jones
Bryce Brand	Fa'Najae Gotay	Isaiah Davis	Shaq Smith
⋅	⋅	⋅	⋅

SS
Jordan Mosley
Fofie Bazzie
⋅

CB
Tino Ellis
Kenny Bennett
⋅

DE	NT	DE
Lawtez Rogers	Oluwaseun Oluwatimi	Keiron Howard
Brett Kulka	Brandon Gaddy	Sam Okuayinonu
⋅	⋅	⋅

CB
Marcus Lewis
Deonte Banks
Vincent Flythe

Offense

WR
Darryl Jones
Brian Cobbs
⋅

WR
D. J. Turner
Sean Savoy
Rayshad Lewis

LT	LG	C	RG	RT
Jaelyn Duncan	Sean Christie	Johnny Jordan	Terrance Davis	Marcus Minor
Ellis McKennie	Evan Gregory	Austin Fontaine	Breyon Gaddy	Spencer Anderson
⋅	⋅	⋅	⋅	⋅

TE
Tyler Mabry
Chig Okonkwo
⋅

WR
Dontay Demus Jr.
Carlos Carriere
Sean Nelson

QB
Josh Jackson
Tyrrell Pigrome
Tyler Desue

Key reserves
Season-ending injury
Antwaine Richardson (knee)
Jeshaun Jones (knee)
Durell Nchami (knee)
Jake Funk (knee)
Lorenzo Harrison III (knee)
Suspension

RB
Anthony McFarland Jr.
Javon Leake
Tayon Fleet-Davis

Special teams
PK Joseph Petrino
P Colton Spangler
KR Javon Leake
PR D. J. Turner
LS James Rosenberry
H Mike Shinsky

== Schedule ==
Date	Time	Opponent	Rank	Site	TV	Result	Attendance
August 31	12:00 p.m.	Howard*		Maryland Stadium; College Park, MD	BTN	W 79–0	32,761
September 7	12:00 p.m.	No. 21 Syracuse*		Maryland Stadium; College Park, MD	ESPN	W 63–20	33,493
September 14	12:00 p.m.	at Temple*	No. 21	Lincoln Financial Field; Philadelphia, PA	CBSSN	L 17–20	30,610
September 27	8:00 p.m.	No. 12 Penn State		Maryland Stadium; College Park, MD (rivalry)	FS1	L 0–59	53,228
October 5	12:00 p.m.	at Rutgers		SHI Stadium; Piscataway, NJ	BTN	W 48–7	30,185
October 12	12:00 p.m.	at Purdue		Ross-Ade Stadium; West Lafayette, IN	BTN	L 14–40	52,296
October 19	3:30 p.m.	Indiana		Maryland Stadium; College Park, MD	BTN	L 28–34	32,606
October 26	3:30 p.m.	at No. 17 Minnesota		TCF Bank Stadium; Minneapolis, MN	ESPN	L 10–52	44,715
November 2	12:00 p.m.	No. 14 Michigan^{†}		Maryland Stadium; College Park, MD	ABC	L 7–38	40,701
November 9	12:00 p.m.	at No. 1 Ohio State		Ohio Stadium; Columbus, OH	FOX	L 14–73	101,022
November 23	3:30 p.m.	Nebraska		Maryland Stadium; College Park, MD	BTN	L 7–54	34,802
November 30	3:30 p.m.	at Michigan State		Spartan Stadium; East Lansing, MI	FS1	L 16–19	51,366
*Non-conference game; ^{†}Homecoming; Rankings from AP Poll and CFP Rankings (after November 5) released prior to game; All times are in Eastern time

== Game summaries ==
=== Howard ===
	1	2	3	4	Total
Bison	0	0	0	0	0
Terrapins	28	28	16	7	79

	Category	Player	Statistics
Offensive	Passing	Josh Jackson	15-24, 245 yds, 4td, 92.9 qbr
Offensive	Rushing	Jake Funk	12 car, 79 yds, 1 td
Offensive	Receiving	Dontay Demus Jr.	3 rec, 100 yds, 2 td
Defensive		Sam Okuayinonu	3 solo-4 ast/7 tot, 1 sack
Defensive		Keandre Jones	1 solo-3 ast/4 tot, 1.5 sack
Defensive		Ayinde Eley	2 solo-4 ast/6 tot

=== Syracuse ===
	1	2	3	4	Total
No. 21 Orange	7	6	7	0	20
Terrapins	21	21	7	14	63

	Category	Player	Statistics
Offensive	Passing	Josh Jackson	21-38, 296 yds, 3td, 1 int, 84.7 qbr
Offensive	Rushing	Javon Leake	7 car, 107 yds, 2 td
Offensive	Receiving	Darryl Jones	3 rec, 70 yds
Defensive		Keandre Jones	7 solo-1 ast/8 tot, 2 sack, 1 ff
Defensive		Jordan Mosley	3 solo,1 sac, 1 int
Defensive		Antoine Brooks	8 solo-1 ast/9 tot

=== At Temple ===
	1	2	3	4	Total
No. 21 Terrapins	2	0	13	2	17
Owls	7	0	6	7	20

	Category	Player	Statistics
Offensive	Passing	Josh Jackson	15-38, 183 yds, 1td, 1 int, 16.1 qbr
Offensive	Rushing	Anthony McFarland Jr.	26 car, 137 yds, 1 td
Offensive	Receiving	Dontay Demus Jr.	3 rec, 42 yds
Defensive		Antoine Brooks	13 solo/13 tot, 1 fr
Defensive		Jordan Mosley	5 solo-2 ast/7 tot, 1ff
Defensive		Chance Campbell	3 solo-1 ast/4 tot, 1 int

=== Penn State ===
	1	2	3	4	Total
No. 12 Nittany Lions	14	24	7	14	59
Terrapins	0	0	0	0	0

	Category	Player	Statistics
Offensive	Passing	Josh Jackson	10-21, 65 yds, 0 int, 3.8 qbr
Offensive	Rushing	Anthony McFarland Jr.	9 car, 31 yds
Offensive	Receiving	Dontay Demus Jr.	1 rec, 18 yds
Defensive		Antoine Brooks	6 solo/6 tot
Defensive		Nick Cross	2 solo-1 ast/3 tot, 1 int
Defensive		Chance Campbell	5 solo-1 ast/6 tot

=== At Rutgers ===
	1	2	3	4	Total
Terrapins	7	20	21	0	48
Scarlet Knights	0	7	0	0	7

	Category	Player	Statistics
Offensive	Passing	Josh Jackson	9-16, 179 yds, 2 td, 60.5 qbr
Offensive	Rushing	Anthony McFarland Jr.	7 car, 87 yds, 2 td
Offensive	Receiving	Dontay Demus Jr.	3 rec, 94 yds, 1 td
Defensive		Ayinde Eley	4 solo-8 ast/12 tot, 1int
Defensive		Keandre Jones	5 solo-5 ast/10 tot, 1 sac
Defensive		Isaiah Davis	2 solo-2 ast/4 tot, 1 int

=== At Purdue ===
	1	2	3	4	Total
Terrapins	0	14	0	0	14
Boilermakers	13	17	3	7	40

=== Indiana ===
	1	2	3	4	Total
Hoosiers	14	10	7	3	34
Terrapins	7	14	7	0	28

=== At Minnesota ===
	1	2	3	4	Total
Terrapins	0	3	0	7	10
No. 17 Golden Gophers	14	14	10	14	52

=== Michigan ===
Michigan at Maryland

Team	1	2	3	4	Total
• No. 14 Wolverines	14	7	14	3	38
Terrapins	0	0	7	0	7

- Date: November 2
- Location: Maryland Stadium
  College Park, MD
- TV announcers (ABC): Steve Levy, Brian Griese, Todd McShay, Molly McGrath

=== At Ohio State ===
Maryland at Ohio State

Team	1	2	3	4	Total
Terrapins	0	0	7	7	14
• No. 1 Buckeyes	21	21	10	21	73

- Date: November 9, 2019
- Location:
  Ohio Stadium
  Columbus, Ohio
- Game start: 12:00 p.m. EST
- TV announcers (FOX): Gus Johnson, Joel Klatt, Jenny Taft

=== Nebraska ===
	1	2	3	4	Total
Cornhuskers	17	17	10	10	54
Terrapins	0	0	0	7	7

=== At Michigan State ===
	1	2	3	4	Total
Terrapins	7	0	9	0	16
Spartans	3	10	0	6	19

== 2020 NFL draft ==
Round	Pick	Player	Position	NFL Club
4	124	Anthony McFarland Jr.	RB	Pittsburgh Steelers
6	198	Antoine Brooks	DB	Pittsburgh Steelers
UDFA		Javon Leake	RB	New York Giants
UDFA		Tino Ellis	CB	New Orleans Saints
UDFA		Tyler Mabry	TE	Seattle Seahawks

== Rankings ==
Ranking movements Legend: ██ Increase in ranking ██ Decrease in ranking — = Not ranked
	Week																
Poll	Pre	1	2	3	4	5	6	7	8	9	10	11	12	13	14	15	Final
AP	—	—	21	—	—	—	—	—	—	—	—	—	—	—	—	—	
Coaches	—	—	25	—	—	—	—	—	—	—	—	—	—	—	—	—	
CFP	Not released										—	—	—	—	—	—	Not released
