= Squirrel White =

American football player (born 2004)

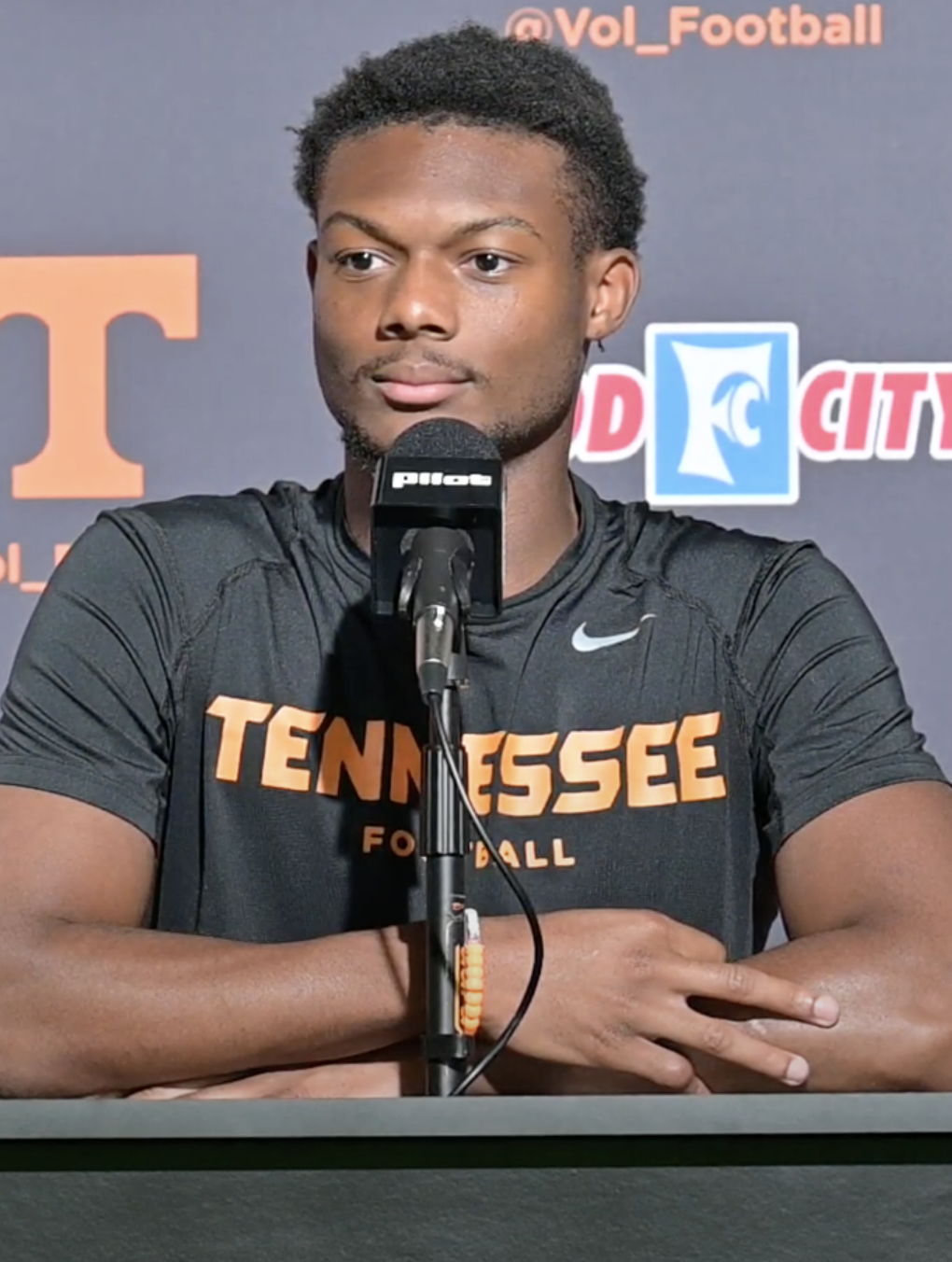
- White in 2024

No. 26
- Position: Wide receiver

Personal information
- Born: May 5, 2004 (age 22); Birmingham, Alabama, U.S.
- Listed height: 5 ft 9 in (1.75 m)
- Listed weight: 177 lb (80 kg)

Career information
- High school: Clay-Chalkville (Clay, Alabama)
- College: Tennessee (2022–2024); Florida State (2025)
- NFL draft: 2026: undrafted

Career history
- Chicago Bears (2026)*
- * Offseason or practice squad member only

Marquarius Malik "Squirrel" White (born May 5, 2004) is an American former professional football wide receiver. He played college football for the Tennessee Volunteers and Florida State Seminoles in college and was signed as an undrafted free agent by the Chicago Bears in 2026. Shortly after, he retired from professional football.

== Early life ==
White's great-grandmother nicknamed him "Squirrel" as an infant because he imitated the movement of a squirrel in her garden. According to White, "When she was holding me, there was a squirrel in her garden. It picked her tomato. And when the squirrel moved, I moved at the same time. So she started calling me [Squirrel]."

== High school career ==
White attended and played high school football at Clay-Chalkville High School in Clay, Alabama. As a senior, he had 49 receptions for 1,162 yards and 16 touchdowns. White committed to the University of Tennessee to play college football. He also ran track in high school.

== College career ==
As a true freshman at Tennessee, White played in 12 games and had 30 receptions for 481 yards with two touchdowns.

After the 2024 school season, White entered the transfer portal. He landed with the Florida State Seminoles.

== Professional career ==
Pre-draft measurables
Height	Weight	Arm length	Hand span	Wingspan	40-yard dash	10-yard split	20-yard split	20-yard shuttle	Three-cone drill	Vertical jump	Broad jump
5 ft 9 3/8 in (1.76 m)	177 lb (80 kg)	30 in (0.76 m)	8 1/2 in (0.22 m)	6 ft 1 1/8 in (1.86 m)	4.64 s	1.64 s	2.65 s	4.35 s	7.05 s	29.5 in (0.75 m)	9 ft 9 in (2.97 m)
All values from Pro Day

White was signed as an undrafted free agent by the Chicago Bears after the conclusion of the 2026 NFL draft.

On May 11, White retired from the NFL.
