= Jaylen Mbakwe =

American football player (born 2005)

No. 3 – Georgia Tech Yellow Jackets
- Position: Cornerback
- Class: Junior

Personal information
- Born: September 28, 2005 (age 21)
- Listed height: 6 ft 0 in (1.83 m)
- Listed weight: 195 lb (88 kg)

Career information
- High school: Clay-Chalkville (Pinson, Alabama)
- College: Alabama (2024–2025); Georgia Tech (2026–present)
- Stats at ESPN

Jaylen Mbakwe (born September 28, 2005) is an American college football cornerback for the Georgia Tech Yellow Jackets. He previously played for the Alabama Crimson Tide.

== Early life ==
Mbakwe attended Clay-Chalkville High School in Pinson, Alabama where he played football and ran track. He entered his junior year with more than 60 scholarship offers. That year he played as both a wide receiver and cornerback. For his senior season, he moved to quarterback and led his team to an Alabama 6A title. He rushed 148 times and recorded over 1,000 yards on the ground while accumulating 23 touchdowns. He also passed for 2,007 yards and 20 touchdowns, and was named MVP of the state championship game after throwing and rushing for 282 yards and four touchdowns. Over the course of his high school career, he lined up as a receiver, running back, defensive back, kick/punt returner, and quarterback. Following his senior season, Mbakwe earned a spot to play in the Under Armour All-America Game and also played in the Alabama-Mississippi All-Star Game.

A five-star recruit, Mbakwe committed to play college football at the University of Alabama over offers from Georgia, USC, LSU, and Notre Dame.

Despite Nick Saban's retirement upon the conclusion of the 2023 season, Mbakwe remained firm in his commitment to Alabama.

College recruiting (2024)
Name	Hometown	School	Height	Weight	Commit date
Jaylen Mbakwe; CB	Clay, Alabama	Clay-Chalkville	5 ft 11 in (1.80 m)	170 lb (77 kg)	Jul 26, 2022
Jaylen Mbakwe; CB	Recruit ratings: Rivals: 247Sports: ESPN: (92)				
