= Tyrrell Pigrome =

American football player (born 1997)

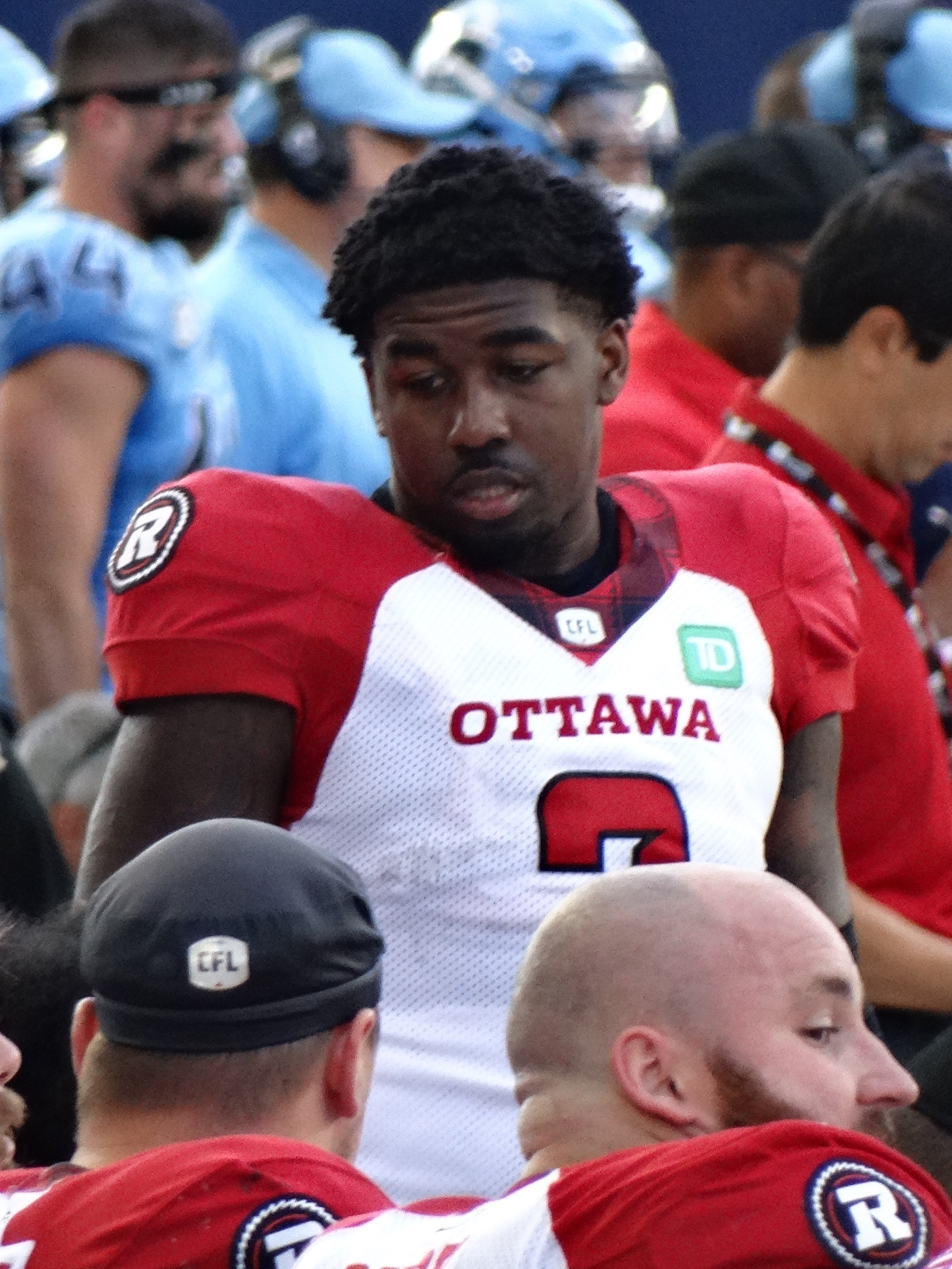
- Pigrome with the Ottawa Redblacks in 2023

Potsdam Royals
- Position: Quarterback

Personal information
- Born: October 22, 1997 (age 29); Birmingham, Alabama, U.S.
- Listed height: 5 ft 9 in (1.75 m)
- Listed weight: 206 lb (93 kg)

Career information
- High school: Clay-Chalkville (Clay, Alabama)
- College: Maryland (2016–2019); Western Kentucky (2020); Ole Miss (2021); Towson (2022)
- NFL draft: 2023: undrafted

Career history
- Winnipeg Blue Bombers (2023); Ottawa Redblacks (2023); Potsdam Royals (2025–present)

Awards and highlights
- German Bowl champion (2025)
- Stats at CFL.ca

Tyrrell Pigrome (born October 22, 1997) is an American professional football quarterback for the Potsdam Royals of the German Football League. He played college football for the Maryland Terrapins, Western Kentucky Hilltoppers, Ole Miss Rebels, and Towson Tigers. He also played for the Winnipeg Blue Bombers and Ottawa Redblacks of the Canadian Football League (CFL).

== Early life ==
Pigrome was born on October 22, 1997, in Birmingham, Alabama. He attended Clay-Chalkville High School in Clay, Alabama, where he also played high school football.

As a junior, Pigrome lead the team to a state championship title while also throwing for 31 touchdowns and rushing for another 18. As a senior in 2015 he was named as the 2015 Gatorade Alabama Player of the Year. He was also a two-time Alabama Mr. Football runner-up, named the Alabama 6A Offensive Player of the Year, and appeared in the Alabama/Mississippi All-Star Game. He committed to play college football for Maryland.

== College career ==
=== Maryland ===
In 2016, Pigrome appeared in eleven games while making one start as a true freshman. He threw for 322 yards on the season with two touchdown passes. He finished third on the team in rushing yards and rushing touchdowns with 254 and four respectively. He made his college football debut against Howard in the second half in relief of starter Perry Hills. He finished the game completing four of his six pass attempts for 60 yards along with seven rushes for 53 yards and his first-career rushing touchdown. He made his first-career start against Minnesota, becoming the first true freshman to start for Maryland since 2012. In the team's 10–31 loss, Pigrome went 18-of-37 for 161 yards, one touchdown, and two interceptions.

In 2017, Pigrome started the season opener against No. 23 Texas. He completed nine of his 12 pass attempts for two touchdowns while adding an additional 65 yards and another rushing touchdown before suffering a season-ending torn ACL in the second half.

In 2018, Pigrome appeared 11 games and started in the final two following a season-ending injury to starter Kasim Hill. On the season he completed 37 of 67 passes for 561 yards while adding 159 rushing yards on 58 carries. He threw a career-high 185 yards against No. 15 Penn State. He made his first start of the season against Ohio State where he led the team to score 51 points in the 51–52 loss.

In 2019, Pigrome appeared in eleven games and started in three. He ended the season going 69 of 118 for 719 yards and three touchdowns while also rushing for 153 yards and rushing for two touchdowns. He became the first quarterback to start a game in four different seasons for the Terrapins since Vic Turyn in 1945 to 1948. He threw for a career-high 210 yards on 17-of-27 passing while also tacking on two passing touchdowns. He made his first start on the season against Purdue. He tallied his first-career 100-yard game. Following the season, Pigrome announced his intention to transfer from Maryland.

=== Western Kentucky ===
In 2020, Pigrome transferred to Western Kentucky. He appeared in 11 games for the Hilltoppers, starting all 11 of them. He finished the season throwing for a career-high 1,603 yards and nine touchdowns while also rushing for a career-high 325 rushing yards and four touchdowns. After the season, he announced his intentions to transfer for a second time.

=== Ole Miss ===
In 2021, Pigrome transferred to Ole Miss as a walk-on. He did not appear in any games for the Rebels and transferred for the third time that offseason.

=== Towson ===
In 2022, Pigrome transferred to Towson. With the Tigers he appeared in 11 games and lead the team to a winning record of 6–5. He threw for a career-high 1,638 yards and 14 touchdowns and a career-high 574 rushing yards.

=== Statistics ===
Year	Team	Games		Passing								Rushing			
Year	Team	GP	Record	Comp	Att	Pct	Yards	Avg	TD	Int	Rate	Att	Yards	Avg	TD
2016	Maryland	11	0–1	37	71	52.1	322	4.5	2	2	93.9	62	254	4.1	4
2017	Maryland	1	1–0	9	12	75.0	175	14.2	2	1	235.8	11	64	5.8	1
2018	Maryland	11	0–2	37	67	55.2	561	8.4	2	1	132.4	58	159	2.7	1
2019	Maryland	11	0–3	69	118	58.5	719	6.1	3	6	107.9	45	153	3.4	2
2021	Western Kentucky	11	5–6	171	297	57.6	1,603	5.4	9	2	111.6	105	325	3.1	4
2021	Ole Miss	DNP													
2022	Towson	11	6–5	155	274	56.6	1,638	6.0	14	6	119.3	134	574	4.3	2
Career		56	12−17	478	839	57.0	5,018	6.0	32	18	115.5	415	1,529	3.7	14

== Professional career ==
After going undrafted in the 2023 NFL draft, Pigrome signed with the Winnipeg Blue Bombers of the Canadian Football League (CFL) on May 18, 2023. Pigrome played well in both the team's preseason games. He played in his first professional game on June 9, 2023, against the Hamilton Tiger-Cats, where he operated the short-yardage team and had two carries for one yard. He dressed in the first three regular season games, but was released on June 27, 2023, as the team re-signed Dakota Prukop as his replacement in short yardage.

On July 11, 2023, the Ottawa Redblacks announced they had signed Pigrome to a contract. The Redblacks had lost quarterbacks Jeremiah Masoli and Tyrie Adams to season-ending injuries. He played four days later, on July 15, 2023, against his former team, the Winnipeg Blue Bombers. He scored his first professional touchdown on August 19, 2023, against the Montreal Alouettes on a rush attempt. He played in 14 games for the Redblacks where he had 39 carries for 108 yards and six touchdowns along with three pass completions from seven attempts for 46 yards. With Masoli and Adams under contract for the 2024 season, Pigrome was released on March 1, 2024.

On February 26, 2025, Pigrome signed with the Potsdam Royals of the German Football League. Potsdam would go on to win the 2025 German Bowl, their third consecutive league championship.
