= A. J. Davis (cornerback, born 1989) =

American football player (born 1989)

No. 20
- Position: Cornerback

Personal information
- Born: July 6, 1989 (age 37); Birmingham, Alabama, U.S.
- Listed height: 6 ft 0 in (1.83 m)
- Listed weight: 183 lb (83 kg)

Career information
- High school: Clay-Chalkville (Clay, Alabama)
- College: Jacksonville State (2007–2011)
- NFL draft: 2012: undrafted

Career history
- New Orleans Saints (2012–2014)
- Stats at Pro Football Reference

Adrian Jarrell Davis (born July 6, 1989) is an American former professional football cornerback who played for the New Orleans Saints of the National Football League (NFL). He played college football at Jacksonville State University.

== Early life ==
Adrian Jarrell Davis was born on July 6, 1989, in Birmingham, Alabama. He played high school football at Clay-Chalkville High School in Clay, Alabama. He recorded 28 tackles, three interceptions for 73 yards, six pass breakups, and 12 kick returns for 277 yards his senior year in 2006.

== College career ==
Davis played for the Jacksonville State Gamecocks of Jacksonville State University from 2008 to 2011. He was redshirted in 2007. He played in all 11 games, starting nine, during the 2008 season, totaling 41 tackles, three interceptions, and six pass breakups while earning Ohio Valley Conference (OVC) All-Newcomer honors. Davis appeared in ten games, starting eight, in 2009, accumulating 23 tackles, one interception return for 55 yards and a touchdown, five pass breakups, and one fumble recovery. He missed the first game of the 2010 season due to injury but then started the final 11 games, recording 34 tackles, one sack, four pass breakups, and one blocked punt. He totaled 28 tackles, two interceptions, three pass breakups, and one fumble recovery as a senior in 2011, garnering All-OVC recognition. Davis majored in exercise science at Jacksonville State.

== Professional career ==
Davis was signed by the New Orleans Saints on May 7, 2012, after going undrafted in the 2012 NFL draft. He was waived/injured on August 11, and reverted to injured reserve on August 13. He was then waived by the Saints on August 17. He was later signed to the team's practice squad on November 6. Davis was promoted to the active roster on December 28 and made his NFL debut on December 30, 2012, against the Carolina Panthers, playing two snaps on special teams. He was waived/injured again on August 19, 2013, and reverted to injured reserve the next day, where he spent the entire 2013 season. On June 23, 2014, he was waived/injured for the third year in a row. He reverted to injured reserve the next day and missed the entire 2014 season. Davis became a free agent on March 10, 2015.
