= Clay-Chalkville High School =

American public high school

Coordinates: 33.69544°N 86.60172°W

Location
- 6623 Roe Chandler Road; Pinson, Alabama 35126; United States

Information
- Type: Public
- Motto: Building a legacy of excellence... Every student, every day
- Established: 1996 (30 years ago)
- School district: Jefferson County Board of Education
- CEEB code: 010689
- Principal: Eugene Dallas, III
- Teaching staff: 81.00 (FTE)
- Grades: 9-12
- Enrollment: 1,388 (2023–2024)
- Student to teacher ratio: 17.14
- Campus: Suburban
- Colors: Navy blue and silver
- Athletics: AHSAA Class 6A
- Nickname: Cougars
- Feeder schools: Clay-Chalkville Middle School
- Website: www.jefcoed.com/o/claychalkvillehs

Clay-Chalkville High School (CCHS) is a public high school in Pinson, Alabama, a suburb of Birmingham, Alabama, United States. It is the second largest of the Jefferson County Board of Education's fourteen high schools. School colors are navy blue and silver, and the athletic teams are called the Cougars. CCHS competes in AHSAA Class 6A athletics. The school was recognized by "Niche.com" as the 42nd "Best High School for Athletes in Alabama" among the top 50 in 2020. CCHS was one of only two Jefferson County System schools so designated among the state's more than 300 high schools.

== Student profile ==
Enrollment in grades 9-12 for the 2020–21 school year is 1,259 students. Approximately 78% of students are African-American, 20% are white, 1% Asian-American, and 1% are two or more races. Roughly 50% of students qualify for free or reduced price lunch.

CCHS has a graduation rate of 94%. Approximately 84% of its students meet or exceed state proficiency standards in mathematics, and 81% meet or exceed standards in reading. The average ACT score for CCHS students is 21 and the average SAT Score is 1480.

== Campus ==
The CCHS campus was constructed in 1996 and is located on the border of Clay and Pinson. It consists of a one-level building with 53 classrooms, four computer labs, four science labs, a choral room, a band room, a media center, a fine arts room, a video production studio, a lunch room, practice and spectator gymnasiums, a 650-seat auditorium, and 766 spaces for parking. The school has fields for baseball, softball, football, and practice. Stadium seating was removed from the old Shades Valley High School and repaired for use at CCHS. The 9,880 sq. ft. media center is a focal point for the school and includes a time capsule placed by the Class of 2001. It overlooks an outdoor amphitheatre through a curved wall of windows. The auditorium has a fully complemented stage with fly tower and scene room.

As of 2024, plans to construct a larger campus and football stadium are underway. The new facility, intended to accommodate for a projected increase in student enrollment, is set to open for the '27-'28 school year.

== Curriculum ==
CCHS students have access to eight Advanced Placement courses:

- Biology
- Calculus
- Chemistry
- English Language & Composition
- English Literature & Composition
- Psychology
- U.S. History
- Computer Science

CCHS students can also take courses in one of six career-based academies:

- Arts & Communication Academy, including vocal and instrumental training, theater, journalism, and visual arts
- Building Science Academy, including agriscience, construction, drafting and design
- Business, Marketing, and Information Technology Academy, which offers courses in entrepreneurship, leadership, and computing fundamentals
- Culinary Arts Academy, offering both training in both culinary arts and tourism/hospitality
- Educational Training & Human Services Academy, which offers a variety of courses in consumer sciences, child development, psychology, and education
- Health Science Academy, with classes in sports medicine, wellness, and nursing fundamentals

CCHS students are eligible for dual enrollment at Jefferson State Community College, allowing them to earn high school and college credit simultaneously.

== Athletics ==
CCHS competes in Alabama High School Athletic Association (AHSAA) Class 6A athletics and fields teams in the following sports:

- Baseball
- Basketball
- Cheerleading
- Cross country
- Flag football
- Football
- Golf
- Indoor track & field
- Outdoor track & field
- Soccer
- Softball
- Tennis
- Volleyball
- Wrestling

CCHS has won state championships in baseball (2003) and football (1999, 2014, 2021 & 2023).

=== Football ===
The Cougars won the Class 6A football Super 6 ion 1999, beating Robert E. Lee-Montgomery, 30–27, in overtime for the school's first AHSAA state championship. The Cougars would win their second AHSAA Class 6A football title in 2014 by beating the Saraland Spartans in a competitive 36–31 game at Jordan-Hare Stadium in Auburn, Alabama. The victory capped a 15–0 season which ended with the Cougars being ranked 35th in the nation by Max Preps and being featured on the website's Tour of Champions.

In 2011 the undefeated CCHS football team had to forfeit all nine of its victories for having used an ineligible player. It appealed the forfeits to the AHSAA, but the appeal was denied. It later took the case to the Jefferson County Circuit Court, where it was granted an injunctive relief and allowed back in the AHSAA playoffs. However, the Etowah County School System challenged the court's decision in order to put Gadsden City High School, who was the 4th seed in region 7 when CCHS forfeited the wins, back in the playoffs. Gadsden City ended up competing instead of CCHS, losing in the first round.

=== Other sports ===
In 2003 the Cougars' baseball team won the 6A state championship in Montgomery.

== Notable alumni ==
- Corey Barber Jr., college football wide receiver for the LSU Tigers
- Nico Collins, wide receiver for the Houston Texans
- Mario Craver, college football wide receiver for the Texas A&M Aggies
- A. J. Davis, former cornerback for the New Orleans Saints
- Quinton Dial, former defensive end for the San Francisco 49ers
- YBN Nahmir, rapper
- Jaylen Mbakwe, college football cornerback for the Georgia Tech Yellow Jackets
- Hayden Moore, former CFL quarterback for the Hamilton Tiger-Cats
- Tyrrell Pigrome, American gridiron football player
- Courtney Porter, Miss Alabama 2011
- Darrin Reaves, former running back for the Carolina Panthers
- Squirrel White, former wide receiver for the Chicago Bears
