= Mario Craver =

American football player (born 2006)

No. 1 – Texas A&M Aggies
- Position: Wide receiver
- Class: Junior

Personal information
- Born: January 9, 2006 (age 20)
- Listed height: 5 ft 9 in (1.75 m)
- Listed weight: 165 lb (75 kg)

Career information
- High school: Clay-Chalkville (Clay, Alabama)
- College: Mississippi State (2024); Texas A&M (2025–present)

Awards and highlights
- Third-team All-SEC (2025)
- Stats at ESPN

Mario Leon Craver (born January 9, 2006) is an American college football wide receiver for the Texas A&M Aggies. He previously played for the Mississippi State Bulldogs.

== Early life ==
Craver attended Clay-Chalkville High School in Clay, Alabama. As a sophomore, he recorded 46 receptions for 937 yards, and 10 touchdowns. A four-star recruit, Craver committed to play college football at Mississippi State University over offers from Alabama, Auburn, and Ole Miss.

== College career ==
=== Mississippi State ===
In Craver's collegiate debut against Eastern Kentucky, he hauled in a 54-yard touchdown pass. Against Texas A&M, he recorded five receptions for 42 yards and a touchdown, before exiting the game early with an injury. Craver finished his freshman season hauling in 17 receptions for 368 yards and three touchdowns. On December 9, 2024, Craver announced that he would enter the transfer portal.

=== Texas A&M ===
On December 17, 2024, Craver announced that he would be committing to Texas A&M University.

=== Statistics ===
Year	Team	Games		Receiving				Rushing			
Year	Team	GP	GS	Rec	Yds	Avg	TD	Att	Yds	Avg	TD
2024	Mississippi State	9	3	17	368	21.6	3	3	7	2.3	0
2025	Texas A&M	12	9	59	917	15.5	4	11	81	7.4	1
Career		21	12	76	1,285	16.9	7	14	88	6.3	1

== Personal life ==
In 2024, Craver was arrested on charges of being in possession of beer and marijuana alongside fellow Bulldog receiver, JJ Harrell. In March 2025, Craver was arrested again for the possession of a vape pen.
