= Nico Collins =

American football player (born 1999)

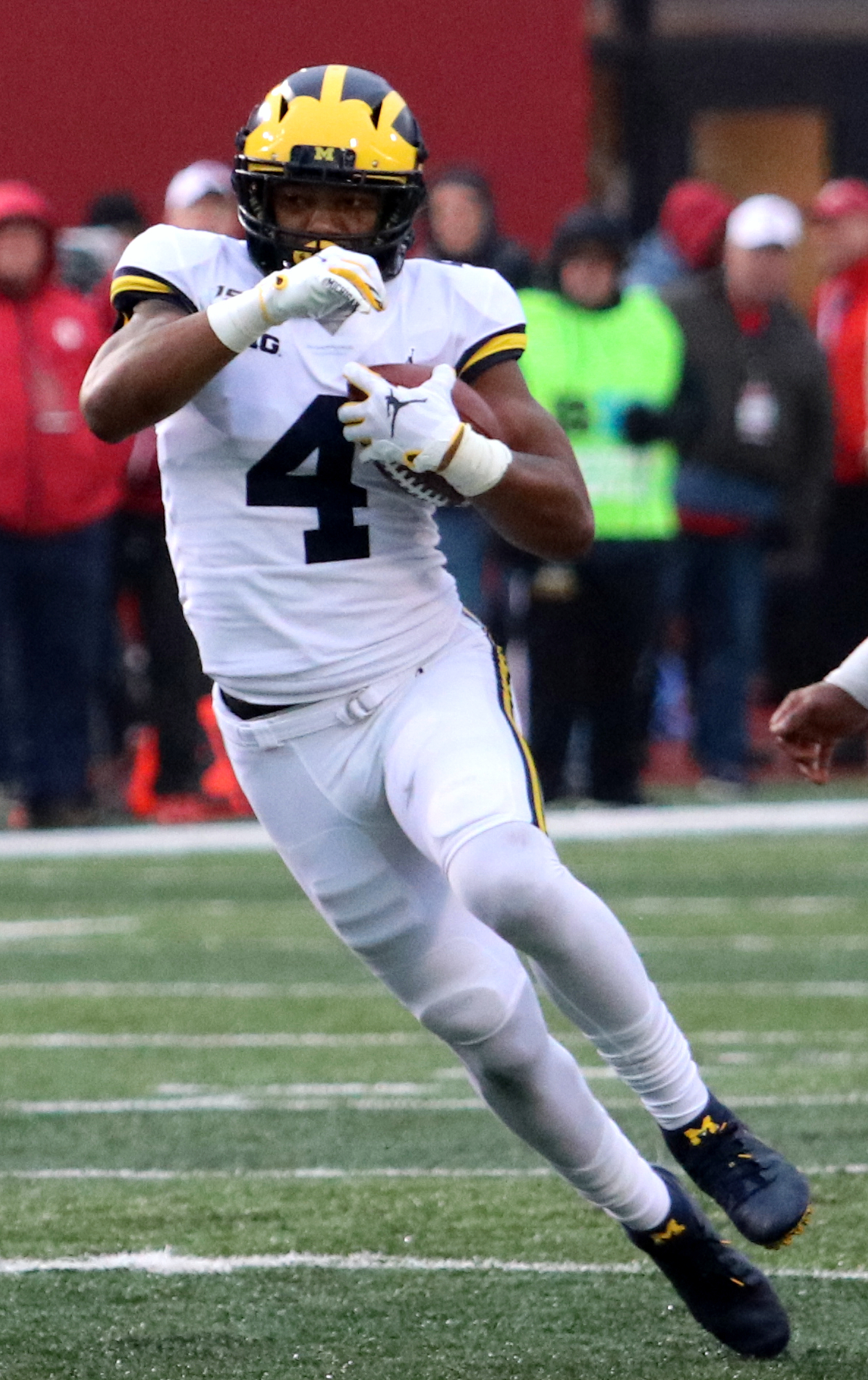
- Collins with the Michigan Wolverines in 2019

No. 12 – Houston Texans
- Position: Wide receiver
- Roster status: Active

Personal information
- Born: March 19, 1999 (age 27); Pinson, Alabama, U.S.
- Listed height: 6 ft 4 in (1.93 m)
- Listed weight: 222 lb (101 kg)

Career information
- High school: Clay-Chalkville (Birmingham, Alabama)
- College: Michigan (2017–2020)
- NFL draft: 2021: 3rd round, 89th overall pick

Career history
- Houston Texans (2021–present)

Awards and highlights
- 2× Pro Bowl (2024, 2025)

Career NFL statistics as of 2025
- Receptions: 289
- Receiving yards: 4,347
- Receiving average: 15.0
- Receiving touchdowns: 24
- Stats at Pro Football Reference

Dominique Stephon "Nico" Collins (born March 19, 1999) is an American professional football wide receiver for the Houston Texans of the National Football League (NFL). He played college football for the Michigan Wolverines and was selected by the Texans in the third round of the 2021 NFL draft.

== Early life ==
Collins was born and raised in Pinson, Alabama, the youngest of three children. His father, Don Collins, a Michigan native, worked as a surgical tech, and his mother worked in human resources. In his youth, Collins played AAU basketball. He attended Clay-Chalkville High School in Clay, Alabama, where he played wide receiver on the undefeated football team that won the 2014 Class 6A state championship. As a junior, he caught 60 passes for 1,103 yards and 16 touchdowns. As a senior, he had 43 receptions for 865 yards and 9 touchdowns. In February 2017, Collins committed to play football at Michigan over Georgia and Alabama. His paternal grandparents live near Buffalo, NY.

College recruiting
| Name | Hometown | School | Height | Weight | 40^{‡} | Commit date |
|---|---|---|---|---|---|---|
| Nico Collins; WR | Birmingham, Alabama | Clay-Chalkville High School | 6 ft 5 in (1.96 m) | 197 lb (89 kg) | 4.50 | Feb 1, 2017 |
| Nico Collins; WR | Recruit ratings: Scout: Rivals: 247Sports: ESPN: | | | | | |
Overall recruit ranking: Rivals: 120 247Sports: 138 ESPN: 150
‡ Refers to 40-yard dash; Note: In many cases, Scout, Rivals, 247Sports, On3, and ESPN may conflict in their listings of height, weight and 40 time.; In these cases, the average was taken. ESPN grades are on a 100-point scale.; Sources: "Michigan Football Commitments". Rivals.; "ESPN". ESPN.; "2017 Team Ranking". Rivals.com.

== College career ==
In 2017, Collins enrolled at the University of Michigan. On October 12, 2017, Collins made his first collegiate reception on a 12 yard pass against Rutgers. As a freshman, he appeared in two games and had three receptions for 27 yards. He had a breakout season in his sophomore year of 2018, earning the Most Improved Offensive Player, finishing the season with 38 receptions for 632 yards and six touchdowns. In 2018 he had four catches for 91 yards and two touchdowns against Ohio State. On November 23, 2019, Collins had a career-best 165 receiving yards and three touchdowns against Indiana. Despite playing alongside Donovan Peoples-Jones, Tarik Black and Ronnie Bell, Collins was second on the team in receiving yards in 2019, with 37 receptions for 729 yards and seven touchdowns.

== Professional career ==
Pre-draft measurables
| Height | Weight | Arm length | Hand span | Wingspan | 40-yard dash | 10-yard split | 20-yard split | 20-yard shuttle | Three-cone drill | Vertical jump | Broad jump | Bench press |
|---|---|---|---|---|---|---|---|---|---|---|---|---|
| 6 ft 4 1/8 in (1.93 m) | 215 lb (98 kg) | 34 1/8 in (0.87 m) | 9 3/8 in (0.24 m) | 6 ft 6 1/2 in (1.99 m) | 4.45 s | 1.55 s | 2.63 s | 4.32 s | 6.79 s | 37.5 in (0.95 m) | 10 ft 5 in (3.18 m) | 14 reps |
All values from Pro Day

=== 2021 season ===
Collins was drafted 89th overall by the Houston Texans in the third round of the 2021 NFL draft. On May 12, Collins officially signed with the Texans. Heading into his first training camp, Collins was listed as a starting wide receiver alongside veterans Brandin Cooks and Chris Conley. Again at the end of the NFL preseason, head coach David Culley named Collins a starting wide receiver, alongside Cooks and Conley.

Collins made his first career start and NFL debut in the Texans' Week 1 victory against the Jacksonville Jaguars. He recorded one reception for seven yards. Collins again started in the Texans' Week 2 loss to the Cleveland Browns, where he recorded one reception for 32 yards before exiting early in the first quarter with a shoulder injury. Collins was placed on injured reserve on September 21. He was activated on October 16, and returned to start the Texans' Week 6 loss to the Indianapolis Colts. In Week 14 against the Seattle Seahawks, Collins recorded five receptions for 69 yards and caught his first career touchdown pass during the Texans' Week 16 victory against the Los Angeles Chargers.

Overall, Collins finished his rookie season appearing in 14 games (8 starts) and recorded 33 receptions for 446 yards and one touchdown while playing in just over half of the Texans' offensive snaps on the season.

=== 2022 season ===
Collins entered the 2022 season as the Texans No. 2 receiver behind Brandin Cooks. He finished the season with 37 catches for 481 yards and two touchdowns, playing in ten games, including seven starts. On December 23, Collins was placed on season–ending injured reserve with a foot injury.

=== 2023 season: Breakout ===
During Week 2 against the Indianapolis Colts, Collins finished with 146 receiving yards and a touchdown as the Texans lost 31–20. In a Week 4 win against the Pittsburgh Steelers, Collins set new single-game career highs with seven receptions for 168 receiving yards and two touchdowns. In Week 13 against the Denver Broncos, Collins would top his single-game career highs in yardage and receptions once again, finishing with nine receptions for 191 receiving yards, adding a touchdown as the Texans won 22–17. In a win-or-go-home scenario against the Colts in Week 18, Collins caught all nine of his targets for a career-high 195 yards and a career-long 75-yard touchdown in a 23–19 win, clinching the Texans a playoff spot for the first time since 2019. He appeared in 15 games and made ten starts in the 2023 season. He had 80 receptions for 1,297 yards and eight touchdowns. He finished the season 8th in the league in receiving yards, and tied 4th in receptions of 20 or more yards.

Collins had a receiving touchdown in the Texans' 45–14 victory over the Browns in the Wild Card Round.

=== 2024 season: Pro Bowler ===
On May 29, Collins agreed to a three-year contract extension with the Texans, worth a maximum of $75 million, with $52 million guaranteed. Collins led the league with 567 receiving yards before suffering a hamstring injury in Week 5 against the Buffalo Bills. On October 9, the Texans placed Collins on injured reserve. He was activated from IR on November 9. In Week 13, he had eight receptions for 119 yards in a 23–20 win over the Jacksonville Jaguars. In Week 15, against the Miami Dolphins, Collins had two touchdowns in the 20–12 victory. He finished the 2024 season with 68 receptions for 1,006 yards and seven touchdowns in 12 games. Collins subsequently earned Pro Bowl honors for the first time in his career.

In the Wild Card Round, Collins had seven receptions for 122 yards and a touchdown in the 32–12 win over the Los Angeles Chargers. He was ranked 32nd by his fellow players on the NFL Top 100 Players of 2025.

=== 2025 season ===
In Week 10 against the Jacksonville Jaguars, Collins had seven receptions for 136 yards in the 36–29 win. He started 15 games for Houston during the 2025 campaign, recording 71 receptions for 1,117 yards and six touchdowns. After suffering a concussion in Houston’s Wild Card Round victory over the Pittsburgh Steelers, Collins missed the team's Divisional Round loss to the New England Patriots, who would go on to appear in Super Bowl LX.

== Career highlights ==
=== Awards & Honors ===
==== NFL ====
- 2× Pro Bowl (2024, 2025)
- First-team PFWA All-NFL (2025)
- Ranked No. 32 in the Top 100 Players of 2025
- Ranked No. 58 in the Top 100 Players of 2026

==== College ====
- 2× All-Big Ten Honorable Mention (2018, 2019)
- Michigan Offensive Player of the Year (2019)
- Most Improved Offensive Player (2018)

=== Records ===
==== Houston Texans franchise records ====
- Most receiving yards through the first four games of a season: 489 yards (2024)
- Third player with three consecutive 1000-yard seasons (2023-2025)

== Career statistics ==
=== NFL ===
==== Regular season ====
| Year | Team | Games | | Receiving | | | | | Fumbles | |
| Year | Team | GP | GS | Rec | Yds | Avg | Lng | TD | Fum | Lost |
|---|---|---|---|---|---|---|---|---|---|---|
| 2021 | HOU | 14 | 8 | 33 | 446 | 13.5 | 32 | 1 | 0 | 0 |
| 2022 | HOU | 10 | 7 | 37 | 481 | 13.0 | 58 | 2 | 0 | 0 |
| 2023 | HOU | 15 | 10 | 80 | 1,297 | 16.2 | 75 | 8 | 1 | 0 |
| 2024 | HOU | 12 | 12 | 68 | 1,006 | 14.8 | 67 | 7 | 0 | 0 |
| 2025 | HOU | 15 | 15 | 71 | 1,117 | 15.7 | 57 | 6 | 1 | 1 |
| Career | | 66 | 52 | 289 | 4,347 | 15.0 | 75 | 24 | 2 | 1 |

==== Postseason ====
| Year | Team | Games | | Receiving | | | | | Fumbles | |
| Year | Team | GP | GS | Rec | Yds | Avg | Lng | TD | Fum | Lost |
|---|---|---|---|---|---|---|---|---|---|---|
| 2023 | HOU | 2 | 2 | 11 | 164 | 14.9 | 38 | 1 | 0 | 0 |
| 2024 | HOU | 2 | 2 | 12 | 203 | 16.9 | 41 | 1 | 0 | 0 |
| 2025 | HOU | 1 | 1 | 3 | 21 | 7.0 | 13 | 0 | 0 | 0 |
| Career | | 5 | 5 | 26 | 388 | 14.9 | 41 | 2 | 0 | 0 |

=== College ===
| Season | Team | G | Receiving | | | |
| Season | Team | G | Rec | Yds | Avg | TD |
|---|---|---|---|---|---|---|
| 2017 | Michigan | 4 | 3 | 27 | 9 | 0 |
| 2018 | Michigan | 13 | 38 | 632 | 16.6 | 6 |
| 2019 | Michigan | 12 | 37 | 729 | 19.7 | 7 |
| 2020 | Michigan | Opted-out due to the COVID-19 pandemic | | | | |
| Career | | 29 | 78 | 1,388 | 17.8 | 13 |
