= Spencer Anderson =

American football player (born 2000)

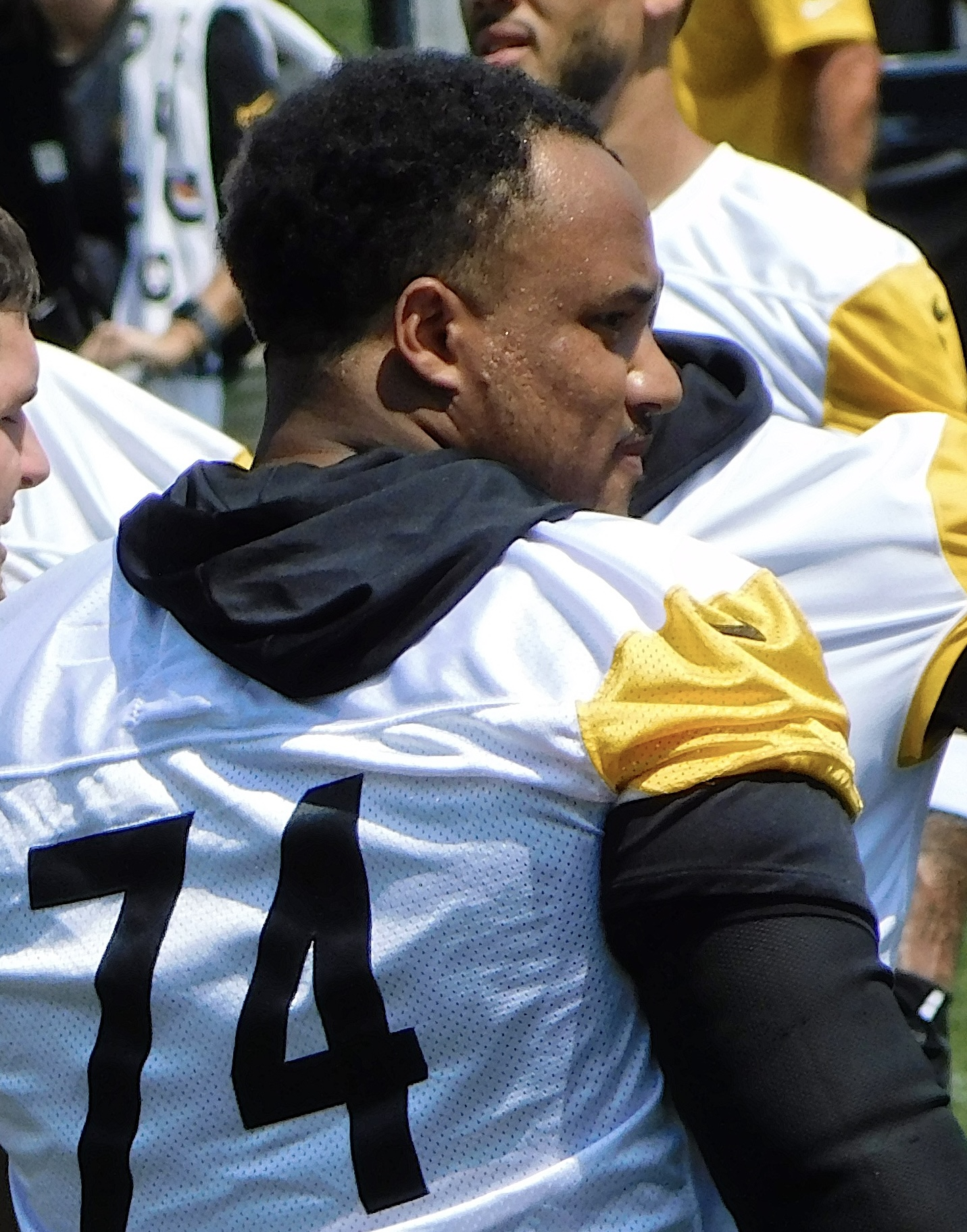
- Anderson with the Pittsburgh Steelers in 2025

No. 74 – Pittsburgh Steelers
- Position: Guard
- Roster status: Active

Personal information
- Born: June 7, 2000 (age 26); Bowie, Maryland, U.S.
- Listed height: 6 ft 5 in (1.96 m)
- Listed weight: 305 lb (138 kg)

Career information
- High school: Bishop McNamara (Forestville, Maryland)
- College: Maryland (2018–2022)
- NFL draft: 2023: 7th round, 251st overall pick

Career history
- Pittsburgh Steelers (2023–present)

Career NFL statistics as of Week 7, 2026
- Games played: 47
- Games started: 13
- Stats at Pro Football Reference

Spencer Anderson (born June 7, 2000) is an American professional football guard for the Pittsburgh Steelers of the National Football League (NFL). He played college football for the Maryland Terrapins.

== Early life ==
Anderson was born on June 7, 2000, and grew up in Bowie, Maryland. He is a cousin of basketball player Harry Giles. Anderson attended Bishop McNamara High School and was ranked a three-star recruit, the 73rd-best tackle and the 17th-best player in the state by 247Sports. He committed to play college football at Maryland over various other offers.

== College career ==
As a true freshman at Maryland in 2018, Anderson made appearances in two games. The following season, he played in all but one of their 12 games, making a single start. He started all five games in the COVID-19-shortened 2020 season. In 2021, Anderson started all 13 games, including four at center and nine at right tackle, only allowing one sack on the year. In his final year, he started all 13 games, including 12 at right guard and one at right tackle, while allowing two sacks. He was invited to the East–West Shrine Bowl following the season.

== Professional career ==
Pre-draft measurables
| Height | Weight | Arm length | Hand span | Wingspan | 40-yard dash | 10-yard split | 20-yard split | 20-yard shuttle | Three-cone drill | Vertical jump | Broad jump | Bench press |
|---|---|---|---|---|---|---|---|---|---|---|---|---|
| 6 ft 4 5/8 in (1.95 m) | 305 lb (138 kg) | 32 1/8 in (0.82 m) | 10 1/2 in (0.27 m) | 6 ft 6 1/4 in (1.99 m) | 5.18 s | 1.80 s | 2.89 s | 5.00 s | 7.63 s | 30.5 in (0.77 m) | 9 ft 5 in (2.87 m) | 29 reps |
All values from Pro Day

Anderson was selected in the seventh round (251st overall) of the 2023 NFL draft by the Pittsburgh Steelers and on May 12, he signed his rookie contract. He made the team's final roster and saw his first playing time in their Week 4 loss to the Houston Texans. As a rookie, he appeared in eight games, but recorded no starts during them. He would make his first postseason appearance in the AFC Wild Card playoff game versus the Buffalo Bills, which the Steelers would lose 31–17, ending Anderson's rookie season.

In the 2024 season, he recorded his first start in Week 1 where the Steelers beat the Atlanta Falcons 18–10. He would subsequently start twice more against the Denver Broncos and the Los Angeles Chargers, both wins for the Steelers. Beginning with Week 4's loss to the Indianapolis Colts, Anderson became a rotational player with rookie left guard Mason McCormick being added to the offensive line's starting lineup. Anderson finished the 2024 season with four starts, but appeared in all 17 regular season games. He made a second postseason appearance with the Steelers in 2024 when the team fell in the AFC Wild card round to the Baltimore Ravens with a final score of 28–14.

== Personal life ==
He married his wife, Savanna, in March 2026.
