= Ayinde Eley =

American football player (born 1998)

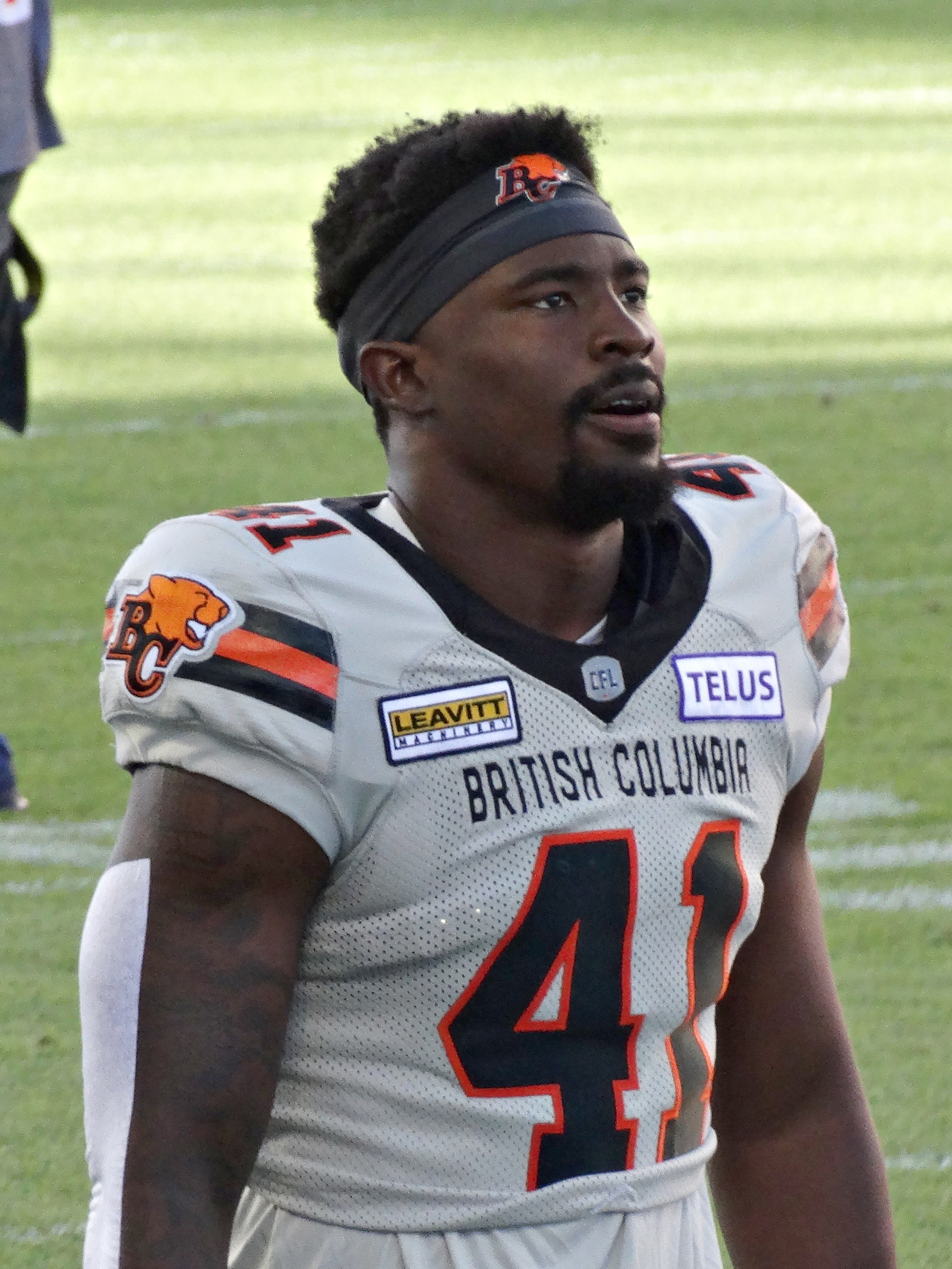
- Eley with the BC Lions in 2024

Profile
- Position: Linebacker

Personal information
- Born: October 22, 1998 (age 28); Silver Spring, Maryland, U.S.
- Listed height: 6 ft 3 in (1.91 m)
- Listed weight: 233 lb (106 kg)

Career information
- High school: Our Lady of Good Counsel (MD)
- College: Maryland (2017–2020); Georgia Tech (2021–2022)

Career history
- 2023: Carolina Panthers*
- 2024: Houston Texans*
- 2024: BC Lions
- 2025: Ottawa RedBlacks
- * Offseason or practice squad member only

Awards and highlights
- Second-team All-ACC (2022)
- Stats at CFL.ca

Ayinde "Ace" Eley (born October 22, 1998) is an American professional football linebacker. He most recently played for the Ottawa Redblacks of the Canadian Football League (CFL). He played college football at Maryland and Georgia Tech. He has also been a member of the Carolina Panthers and Houston Texans of the National Football League (NFL), and the BC Lions of the CFL.

== Early life ==
Eley attended Our Lady of Good Counsel High School in Olney, Maryland. He was rated the No. 2 outside linebacker in Maryland, and a four-star recruit by Scout.com in the class of 2017.

== College career ==
Eley first played college football for the Maryland Terrapins from 2018 to 2020. He was redshirted in 2017. He played in 12 games, starting one, in 2018, recording 13 tackles, one interception, and one pass breakup. Eley appeared in 11 games, starting nine, during the 2019 season, totaling 79 tackles, 0.5 sacks, one interception, five pass breakups, and two fumble recoveries, earning honorable mention All-Big Ten honors. He played in three games, starting one, during the COVID-19 shortened 2020 season, and made 19 tackles.

Eley transferred to play for the Georgia Tech Yellow Jackets from 2021 to 2022. He played in 11 games, all starts, in 2021, recording 90 tackles, 0.5 sacks, and one pass breakup. He started all 12 games during the 2022 season, totaling 118 tackles, 3.5 sacks, four forced fumbles, and two fumble recoveries, garnering second team all-ACC recognition.

== Professional career ==
Pre-draft measurables
Height	Weight	Arm length	Hand span	40-yard dash	10-yard split	20-yard split	20-yard shuttle	Three-cone drill	Vertical jump	Broad jump	Bench press
6 ft 3 1/5 in (1.91 m)	230 lb (104 kg)	31 7/8 in (0.81 m)	9 1/2 in (0.24 m)	4.97 s	1.76 s	2.96 s	4.62 s	7.50 s	32 in (0.81 m)	10 ft 0 in (3.05 m)	20 reps
All values from Pro Day

=== Carolina Panthers ===
After going undrafted in the 2023 NFL draft, Eley signed with the Carolina Panthers on May 16, 2023. He was waived on August 29. He was later signed to the team's practice squad on November 7, 2023.

=== Houston Texans ===
Eley was signed by the Houston Texans on January 22, 2024. He was waived on March 21, 2024.

=== BC Lions ===
Eley signed with the BC Lions of the Canadian Football League (CFL) on April 3, 2024. He was moved to the practice roster on June 20, and promoted to the active on June 26. During the 2024 season he played 17 games and one playoff game, becoming a starting linebacker, making 60 tackles, one special teams tackle, and one forced fumble. He was selected as the Lions nominee for Outstanding Rookie.

On February 22, 2025, it was reported that the Lions had released Eley, having signed linebackers Micah Awe, Adam Auclair and Adam Konar in free agency.

=== Ottawa RedBlacks ===
On February 24, 2025, Eley signed with the Ottawa Redblacks. He played in five regular season games, including two starts, where he had 13 13 defensive tackles, one special teams tackle, and one interception. He was released on October 1, 2025.

== Personal life ==
Eley's father, Donald Hill-Eley, is a football coach.
