= Sam Okuayinonu =

Liberian gridiron football player (born 1998)

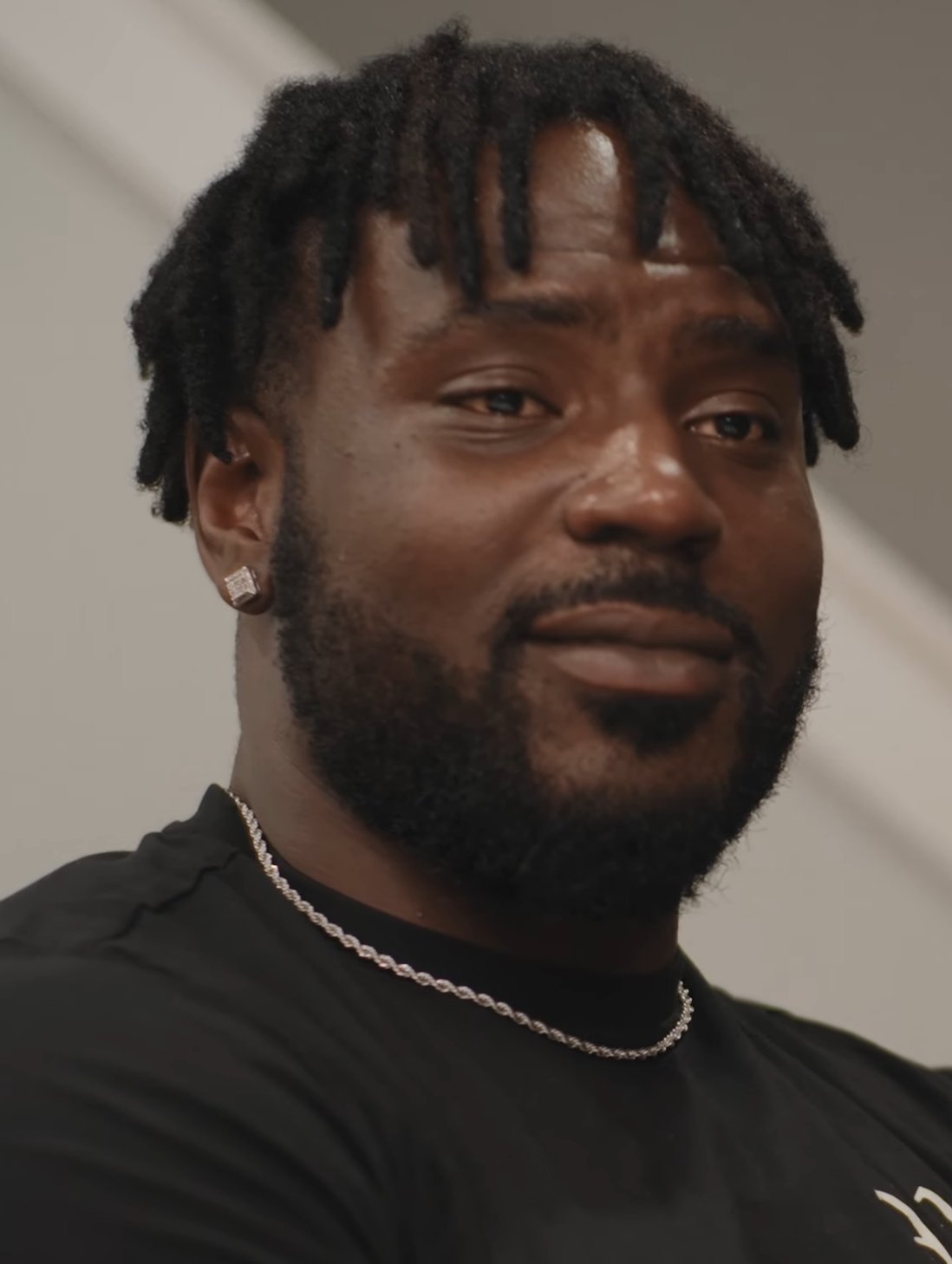
- Okuayinonu in 2023

No. 91 – San Francisco 49ers
- Position: Defensive end
- Roster status: Injured reserve

Personal information
- Born: May 1, 1998 (age 28); Monrovia, Liberia
- Listed height: 6 ft 1 in (1.85 m)
- Listed weight: 269 lb (122 kg)

Career information
- High school: Lowell (Lowell, Massachusetts, U.S.)
- College: Maryland (2019–2021)
- NFL draft: 2022: undrafted

Career history
- Tennessee Titans (2022); San Francisco 49ers (2023–present)

Awards and highlights
- Third-team All-Big Ten (2021)

Career NFL statistics as of 2025
- Total tackles: 85
- Sacks: 6.5
- Forced fumbles: 2
- Pass deflections: 1
- Stats at Pro Football Reference

Sam Okuayinonu (born May 1, 1998) is a Liberian professional American football defensive end for the San Francisco 49ers of the National Football League (NFL). He played college football for the Maryland Terrapins, and signed as undrafted free agent with the Tennessee Titans in 2022.

== Early life ==
Sam Okuayinonu was a three-star recruit from Lowell, Massachusetts. He played defensive line for Lowell High School graduating in 2016.

== College career ==
On January 26, 2019, Okuayinonu committed to the Maryland Football. At Maryland, Okuayinonu had a total of 90 tackles, 12.0 tackles for loss and 5.5 sacks. After the 2021 Pinstripe Bowl, Okuayinonu declared for the draft.

== Professional career ==
Pre-draft measurables
Height	Weight	Arm length	Hand span	Wingspan	40-yard dash	10-yard split	20-yard split	20-yard shuttle	Three-cone drill	Vertical jump	Broad jump	Bench press
6 ft 1 in (1.85 m)	269 lb (122 kg)	33 1/4 in (0.84 m)	9 1/4 in (0.23 m)	6 ft 5 in (1.96 m)	4.77 s	1.62 s	2.71 s	4.58 s	7.48 s	35.5 in (0.90 m)	10 ft 3 in (3.12 m)	31 reps
All values from Pro Day

=== Tennessee Titans ===
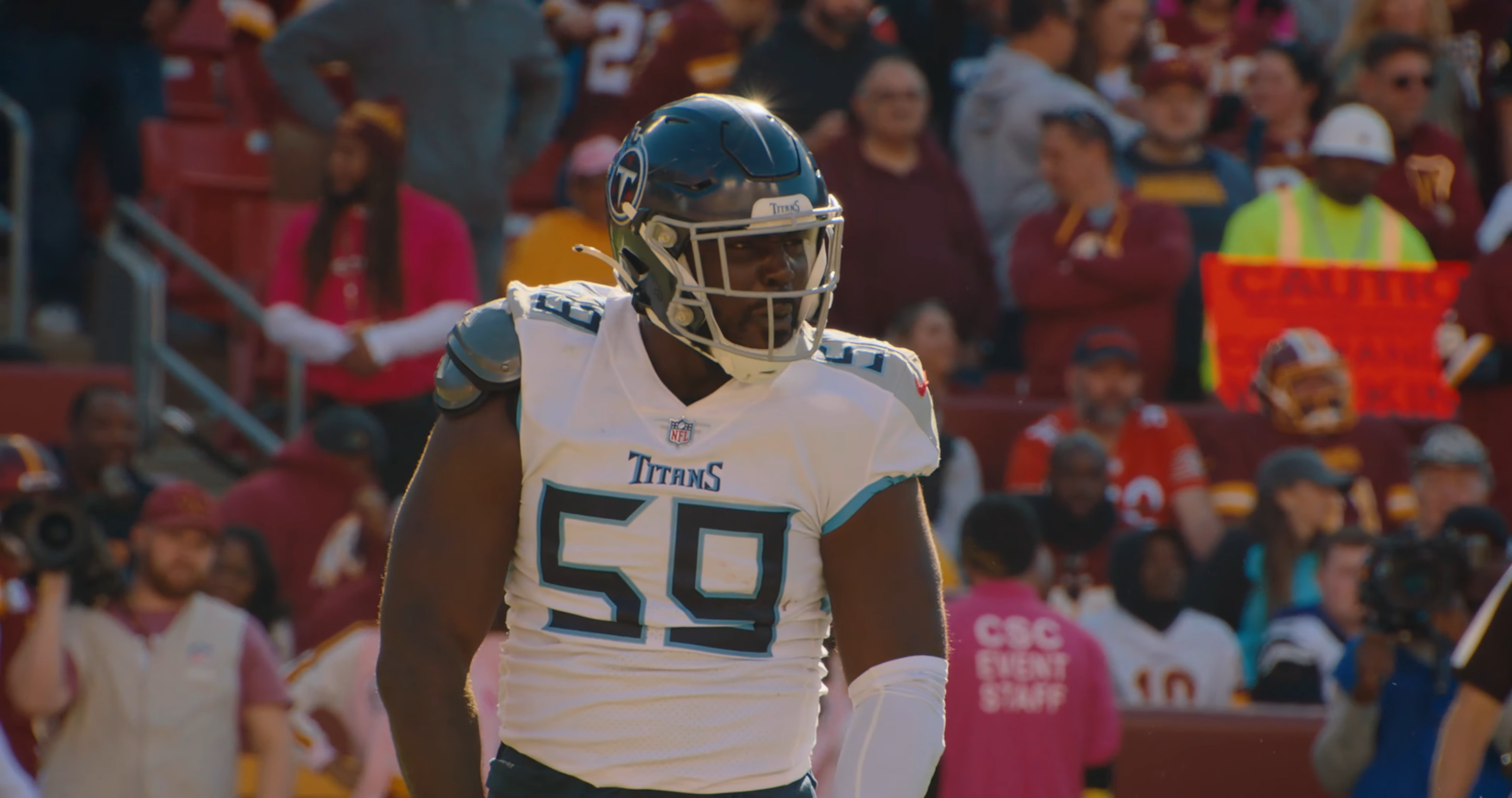
Okuayinonu playing for the Tennessee Titans in 2022

Okuayinonu was not selected in the 2022 NFL draft. On April 30, 2022, he signed with the Tennessee Titans as an undrafted free agent. Okuayinonu was waived by the Titans as a part of final roster cuts on August 30; he was re–signed to the team's practice squad the following day. He was promoted to the active roster on October 4. The Titans waived Okuayinonu on December 6, and subsequently re-signed with the team's practice squad. He was promoted to the active roster on December 29, then waived the next day and re-signed back to the practice squad.

Okuayinonu signed a reserve/future contract with the Titans on January 10, 2023. On August 29, he was waived by Tennessee during final roster cuts before the start of the regular season. Though Okuayinonu re–signed with the practice squad on August 30, the next day he was released again.

=== San Francisco 49ers ===
On January 10, 2024, Okuayinonu was signed to the San Francisco 49ers' practice squad. He signed a reserve/future contract with the 49ers on February 13.

Okuayinonu was waived by the 49ers on August 28, 2024, and re-signed to the practice squad. He was promoted to the active roster on September 28. Okuayinonu played in 16 games (starting three) for San Francisco, logging one pass defensed, one forced fumble, three sacks, and 35 combined tackles.

On March 26, 2025, Okuayinonu re-signed with the 49ers. He made 15 appearances (including 12 starts) for the team, recording one forced fumble, three sacks, and 39 combined tackles.

Designated as an restricted free agent in the 2026 offseason, the 49ers tendered him on March 11, 2026 and re-signed him a week later. He was placed on injured reserve on September 4, after suffering a broken foot. It was subsequently announced that Okuayinonu would require surgery to address the injury, putting his season in jeopardy.

== NFL career statistics ==
Legend
**Bold**	Career high

=== Regular season ===
Year	Team	Games		Tackles					Interceptions						Fumbles			
Year	Team	GP	GS	Cmb	Solo	Ast	TFL	Sck	PD	Int	Yds	Avg	Lng	TD	FF	FR	Yds	TD
2022	TEN	6	0	11	3	8	0	0.5	0	0	0	0.0	0	0	0	0	0	0
2024	SF	**16**	3	35	**25**	10	**6**	**3.0**	**1**	0	0	0.0	0	0	**1**	0	0	0
2025	SF	15	**12**	**39**	23	**16**	**6**	**3.0**	0	0	0	0.0	0	0	**1**	0	0	0
Career		37	15	85	51	34	12	6.5	1	0	0	0.0	0	0	2	0	0	0

=== Postseason ===
Year	Team	Games		Tackles					Interceptions						Fumbles			
Year	Team	GP	GS	Cmb	Solo	Ast	TFL	Sck	PD	Int	Yds	Avg	Lng	TD	FF	FR	Yds	TD
2025	SF	2	2	6	4	2	0	0.0	0	0	0	0.0	0	0	0	0	0	0
Career		2	2	6	4	2	0	0.0	0	0	0	0.0	0	0	0	0	0	0
