= Tyler Mabry =

American football player (born 1996)

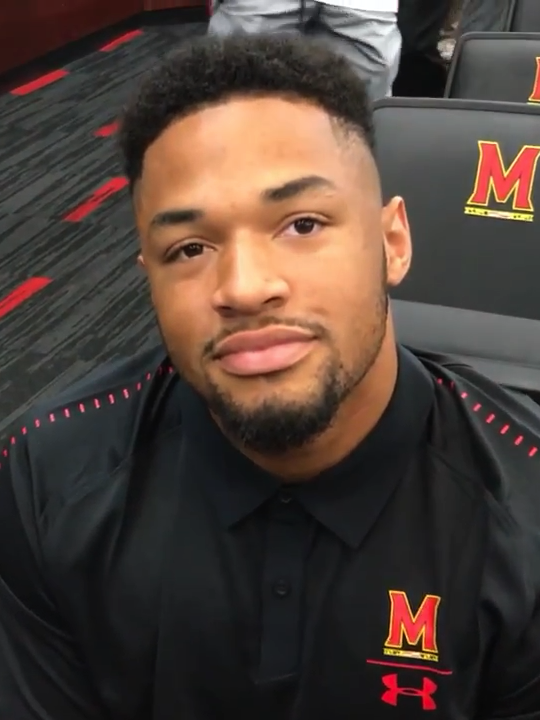
- Mabry in 2019

No. 85, 43
- Position: Tight end

Personal information
- Born: November 21, 1996 (age 29); Ypsilanti, Michigan, U.S.
- Listed height: 6 ft 3 in (1.91 m)
- Listed weight: 247 lb (112 kg)

Career information
- High school: IMG Academy (Bradenton, Florida)
- College: Buffalo (2015–2018); Maryland (2019)
- NFL draft: 2020: undrafted

Career history
- Seattle Seahawks (2020–2024); Carolina Panthers (2025)*
- * Offseason or practice squad member only

Awards and highlights
- First-team All-MAC (2018)

Career NFL statistics
- Receptions: 1
- Receiving yards: 7
- Receiving touchdowns: 1
- Stats at Pro Football Reference

Tyler Robert Mabry (born November 21, 1996) is an American former professional football player who was a tight end for six seasons in the National Football League (NFL). He played college football for the Buffalo Bulls and Maryland Terrapins.

== College career ==
Mabry began his collegiate career at the University at Buffalo and redshirted his true freshman season. As a redshirt junior, he caught 27 passes for 230 yards and two touchdowns and was named first-team All-Mid-American Conference. Mabry transferred to the University of Maryland, College Park, as a graduate transfer for his final season of NCAA eligibility. In his only season with the Terrapins, Mabry started all 12 of the team's games and caught 13 passes for 155 yards and three touchdowns.

== Professional career ==
Pre-draft measurables
Height	Weight	Arm length	Hand span
6 ft 2 3/4 in (1.90 m)	247 lb (112 kg)	34 1/4 in (0.87 m)	10 3/4 in (0.27 m)
All values from Pro Day

=== Seattle Seahawks ===
Mabry signed with the Seattle Seahawks as an undrafted free agent on May 4, 2020. He was waived at the end of training camp during final roster cuts on September 5, 2020, but was signed by to the team's practice squad the following day. Mabry spent the entire 2020 season on the Seahawks' practice squad and signed a reserve/futures contract with the team on January 11, 2021. He was waived at the end of the preseason on August 31, 2021, and again resigned to the practice squad on September 1. The Seahawks promoted Mabry to their active roster on September 6, 2021. He was waived on November 12 and re-signed to the practice squad. He was promoted back to the active roster on January 8, 2022.

On August 30, 2022, Mabry was waived by the Seahawks and signed to the practice squad the next day.

He was promoted to the Seahawks' active roster on December 31, 2022 and scored his first NFL touchdown the next day on a seven-yard reception from Geno Smith in the second quarter of the game against the New York Jets. On January 4, 2023, Seattle signed Mabry to the active roster.

On August 29, 2023, Mabry was waived by the Seahawks and re-signed to the practice squad. He signed a reserve/future contract on January 8, 2024.

Mabry was waived by the Seahawks on August 27, 2024, and re-signed to the practice squad. He was promoted to the active roster on November 16.

=== Carolina Panthers ===
On July 22, 2025, Mabry signed with the Carolina Panthers. He was placed on injured reserve on August 18, and released a week later. He announced his retirement in May 2026.

== Personal life ==
He is married to 2024 Olympic Games gold medalist Yemisi Ogunleye.
