= Keandre Jones =

American football player (born 1997)

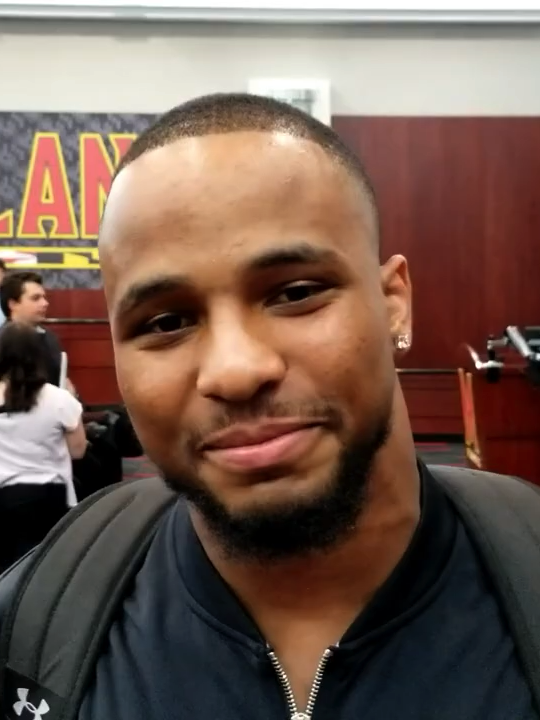
- Jones in 2019

Profile
- Position: Linebacker

Personal information
- Born: September 24, 1997 (age 29); Olney, Maryland, U.S.
- Listed height: 6 ft 3 in (1.91 m)
- Listed weight: 220 lb (100 kg)

Career information
- High school: Good Counsel (Olney)
- College: Ohio State (2016–2018); Maryland (2019)
- NFL draft: 2020: undrafted

Career history
- Chicago Bears (2020)*; Cincinnati Bengals (2020–2023); Washington Commanders (2024)*
- * Offseason or practice squad member only

Career NFL statistics as of 2023
- Tackles: 4
- Stats at Pro Football Reference

Keandre Jones (born September 24, 1997) is an American professional football linebacker. He played college football for the Ohio State Buckeyes and Maryland Terrapins and entered the NFL as an undrafted free agent in 2020. Jones has also been a member of the Chicago Bears, Cincinnati Bengals, and Washington Commanders.

== Professional career ==
=== Chicago Bears ===
Jones signed with the Chicago Bears as an undrafted free agent following the 2020 NFL draft on April 28, 2020. He was waived on September 3, 2020.

=== Cincinnati Bengals ===
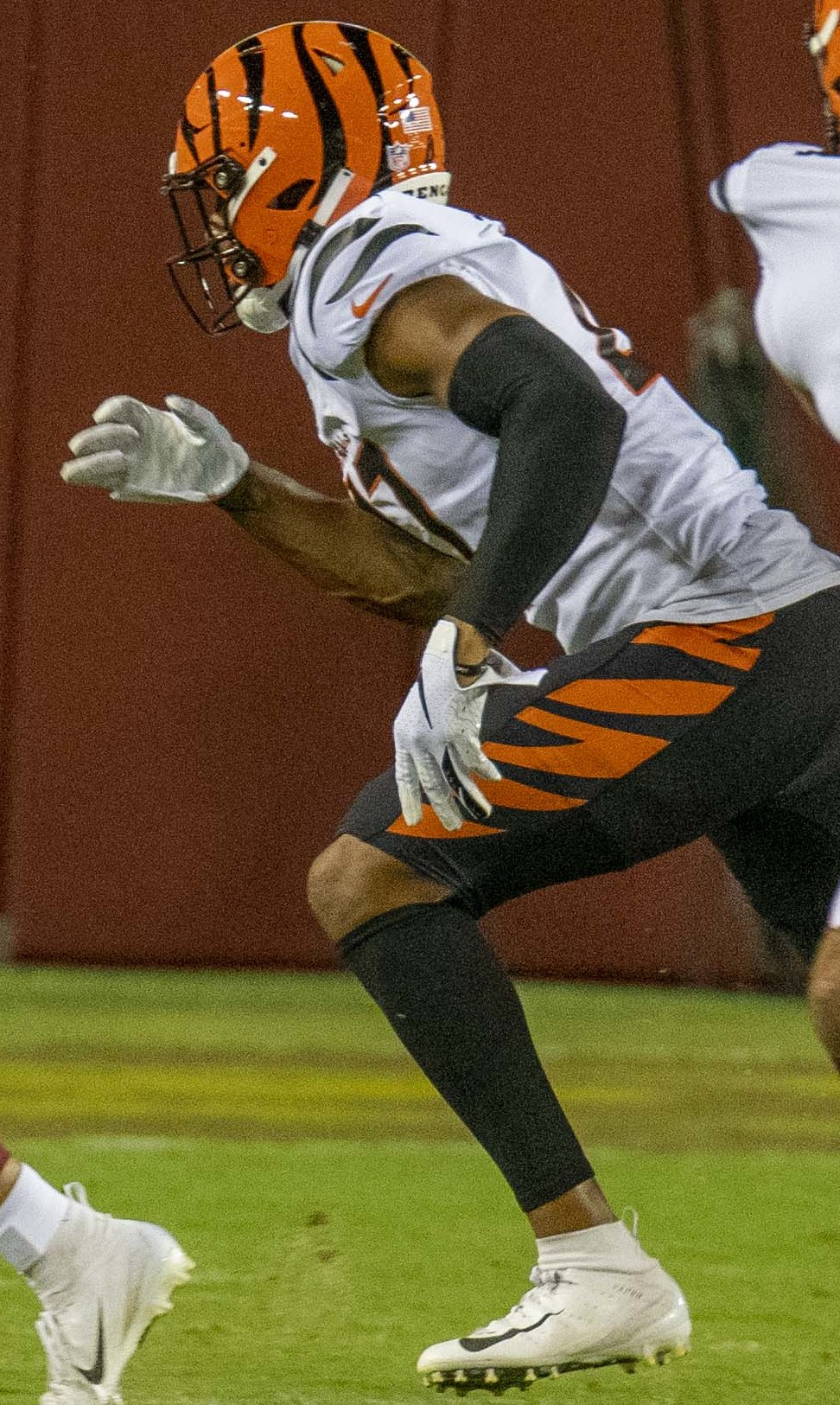
Jones with the Bengals in 2021

Jones signed with the Cincinnati Bengals' practice squad on September 8, 2020. He was elevated to the active roster on December 26 and January 2, 2021, for the team's weeks 16 and 17 games against the Houston Texans and Baltimore Ravens, and reverted to the practice squad after each game. He signed a reserve/future contract with the Bengals following the season on January 4, 2021.

On August 31, 2021, Jones was waived by the Bengals and re-signed to the practice squad the next day. He was promoted to the active roster on December 21. On August 30, 2022, Jones was waived by the Bengals and signed to the practice squad the next day. He signed a reserve/future contract on January 31, 2023. On August 29, 2023, Jones was yet again waived by the Bengals.

=== Washington Commanders ===
Jones signed with the Washington Commanders on February 23, 2024. He was released on August 20, 2024.
