= Antoine Brooks =

American football player (born 1997)

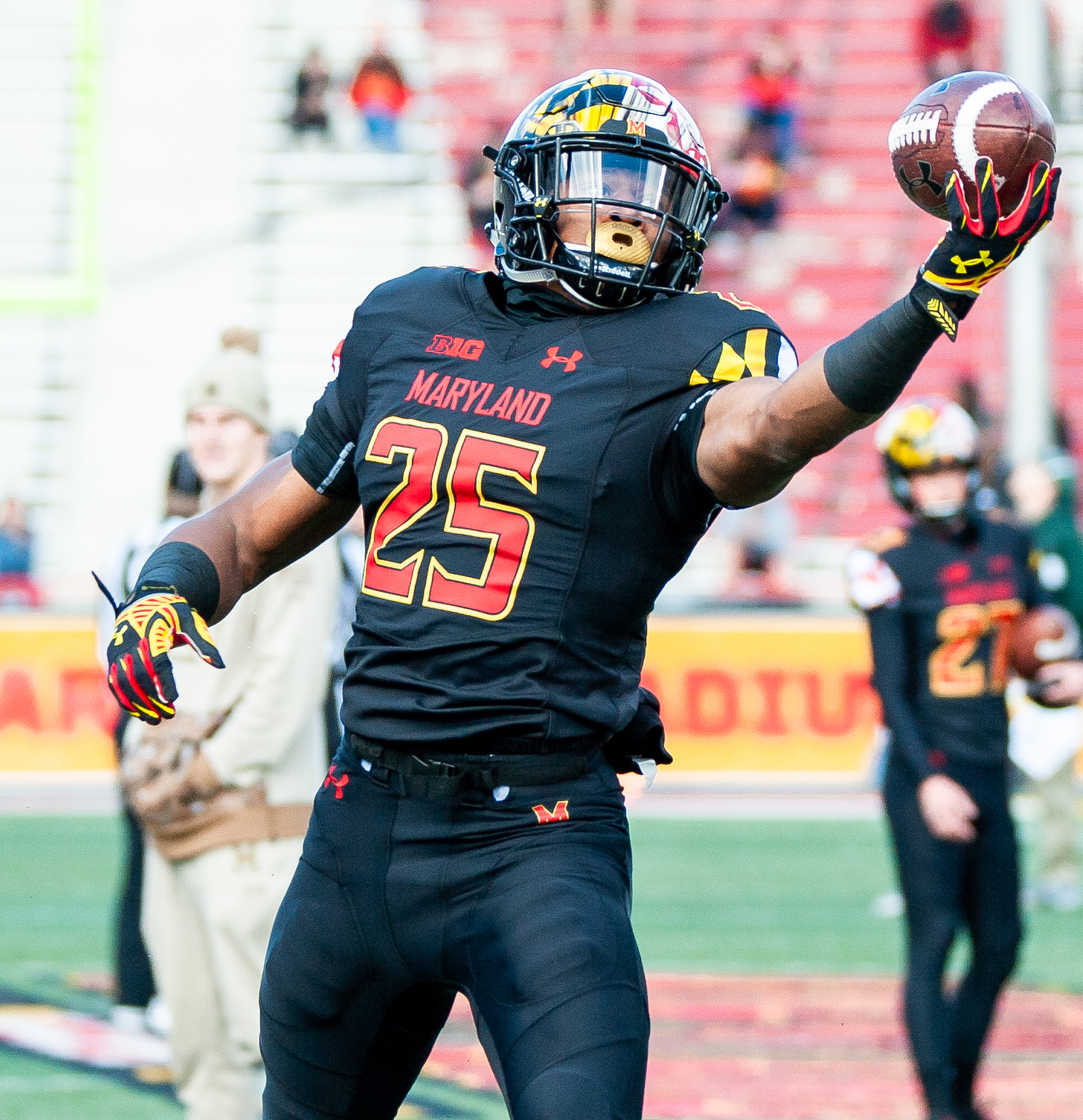
- Brooks with the Maryland Terrapins in 2018

No. 5 – Saskatchewan Roughriders
- Position: Safety
- Roster status: Practice roster
- CFL status: American

Personal information
- Born: October 28, 1998 (age 28); Lanham, Maryland, U.S.
- Listed height: 5 ft 11 in (1.80 m)
- Listed weight: 215 lb (98 kg)

Career information
- High school: DuVal (Lanham)
- College: Maryland (2016–2019)
- NFL draft: 2020: 6th round, 198th overall pick

Career history
- Pittsburgh Steelers (2020); Los Angeles Rams (2021); Seattle Sea Dragons (2023); Memphis Showboats (2024)*; Saskatchewan Roughriders (2024–present)
- * Offseason or practice squad member only

Awards and highlights
- Super Bowl champion (LVI); Grey Cup champion (2025); 2× Second-team All-Big Ten (2018, 2019)

Career NFL statistics
- Total tackles: 5
- Stats at Pro Football Reference

Career CFL statistics as of 2025
- Total tackles: 30
- Sacks: 2
- Interceptions: 2
- Defensive touchdowns: 1
- Stats at CFL.ca

Antoine Brooks Jr. (born October 28, 1997) is an American professional football safety for the Saskatchewan Roughriders of the Canadian Football League (CFL). He played college football at Maryland and was selected by the Pittsburgh Steelers in the sixth round of the 2020 NFL draft.

== Early life ==
Brooks grew up in Lanham, Maryland, and attended DuVal High School. He was a starting defensive back and quarterback for the Tigers. As a junior, he was named first-team All-Metro by The Washington Post and first-team All-State at defensive back. Midway through his senior season Brooks suffered a compound fracture on his ankle and a broken wrist while throwing a pass against Wise High School, requiring five hours of surgery to repair and putting his football career in doubt. He was still named second-team All-Metro, first-team All-State and the Prince George's County 4A Offensive Player of the Year despite missing half of the season. Although he originally had over 15 scholarship offers, much of his recruiting interest faded after his injury and he initially committed to play college football at Buffalo. Brooks committed to play at Maryland a few days before National Signing Day after a late push from coach D. J. Durkin over offers from Pitt, Indiana, Hawaii, Buffalo, Army, Old Dominion and Charlotte.

== College career ==
Brooks played in six games, mostly on special teams, during his freshman season before being suspended for the rest of the season. He became the Terrapins' primary nickel back as a sophomore and finished second on the team with 77 tackles and led all defensive backs in the Big Ten Conference with 9.5 tackles for loss along with one sack, two interceptions, three pass breakups and a forced fumble. As a junior, Brooks was Maryland's third leading tackler with 68 and led the team with 9.5 tackles for loss with 2.5 sacks, three passes defended and an interception and was named second-team All-Big Ten by the league's coaches. As a senior, Brooks played safety and nickel linebacker and lead the team with 87 tackles with 8.5 tackles for loss, and interception and six passes defended and again named second-team All-Big Ten by the coaches and to the third-team by the media.

== Professional career ==
Pre-draft measurables
Height	Weight	Arm length	Hand span	Wingspan	40-yard dash	10-yard split	20-yard split	Vertical jump	Bench press
5 ft 10 5/8 in (1.79 m)	220 lb (100 kg)	31 1/8 in (0.79 m)	9 1/4 in (0.23 m)	6 ft 2 7/8 in (1.90 m)	4.64 s	1.53 s	2.70 s	34.5 in (0.88 m)	18 reps
All values from NFL Combine

=== Pittsburgh Steelers ===
Brooks was selected by the Pittsburgh Steelers with the 198th pick in the sixth round of the 2020 NFL draft. He was waived on September 5, 2020, and signed to the practice squad the next day. He was elevated to the active roster on October 31, November 7, November 14, and November 30 for the team's weeks 8, 9, 10, and 12 games against the Baltimore Ravens, Dallas Cowboys, Cincinnati Bengals, and Ravens, and reverted to the practice squad after each game. He was signed to the active roster on December 3.

On August 24, 2021, Brooks was waived/injured and placed on injured reserve. He was released on September 2.

=== Los Angeles Rams ===
On September 4, 2021, Brooks was signed to the Los Angeles Rams practice squad. He was promoted to the active roster on November 9. He was waived on January 29, 2022, and re-signed to the practice squad. Brooks won Super Bowl LVI when the Rams defeated the Cincinnati Bengals.

On February 15, 2022, Brooks signed a reserve/future contract with the Rams. He was waived on May 4.

=== Seattle Sea Dragons ===
On November 17, 2022, Brooks was drafted by the Seattle Sea Dragons of the XFL. The Sea Dragons folded when the XFL and United States Football League merged to create the United Football League (UFL).

=== Memphis Showboats ===
On January 15, 2024, Brooks was selected by the Memphis Showboats in the 12th round of the Super Draft portion of the 2024 UFL dispersal draft. He signed with the team on January 30. Brooks was released on March 10.

=== Saskatchewan Roughriders ===
On April 11, 2024, Brooks signed with the Saskatchewan Roughriders of the Canadian Football League (CFL).
