= Tino Ellis =

American football player (born 1997)

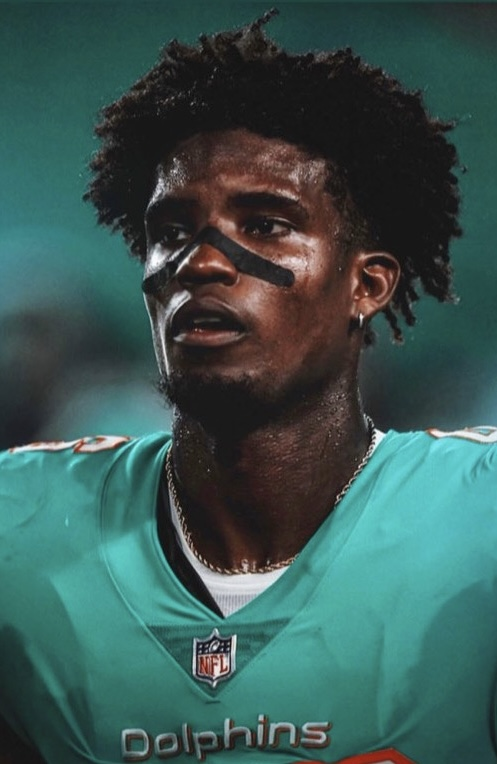
- Ellis with the Miami Dolphins in 2021

No. 34, 5, 7
- Position: Cornerback

Personal information
- Born: October 15, 1997 (age 29); Baltimore, Maryland, U.S.
- Listed height: 6 ft 1 in (1.85 m)
- Listed weight: 195 lb (88 kg)

Career information
- High school: DeMatha Catholic (Hyattsville, Maryland)
- College: Maryland
- NFL draft: 2020: undrafted

Career history
- New Orleans Saints (2020)*; Miami Dolphins (2020–2021)*; Michigan Panthers (2022); Miami Dolphins (2023)
- * Offseason or practice squad member only
- Stats at Pro Football Reference

Tino Ellis (born October 15, 1997) is an American former professional football cornerback and model. After playing college football at Maryland, he signed with the New Orleans Saints as an undrafted free agent in 2020.

== Early life ==
Ellis attended DeMatha Catholic High School in Hyattsville, Maryland where he was a 4 star recruit, 2016 Under Armour All-American, and lead his school to three straight WCAC Championships. At DeMatha he was teammates of defensive end Chase Young and running back Anthony Mcfarland Jr. who were both selected in the 2020 NFL draft. He committed to University of Maryland to play college football. At Maryland he was a four-year letterman. His breakout season came in 2018 as a junior, where he started all 12 games and earned Honorable Mention All-Big Ten honors. That year, he led the Terrapins with 11 pass breakups, ranking fourth in the Big Ten. On September 22, 2018, against Minnesota, Ellis recorded five pass breakups, tying the FBS single-game high for that season. His senior season was cut short due to an upper-body injury suffered against Purdue.

== Professional career ==
=== New Orleans Saints ===
Ellis signed with the New Orleans Saints as an undrafted free agent following the 2020 NFL draft on April 25, 2020. He was waived by New Orleans from the injured reserve list on August 19.

=== Miami Dolphins (first stint) ===
Ellis signed with the Miami Dolphins on October 15, 2020. On August 31, 2021, Ellis was waived by the Dolphins and re-signed to the practice squad the next day. Ellis was waived again by Miami on September 6.

=== Michigan Panthers ===
Ellis was selected in the 8th round of the 2022 USFL draft by the Michigan Panthers. He appeared in nine games during the 2022 season, recording 35 tackles and two interceptions before returning to the NFL for a second stint with the Miami Dolphins.

=== Miami Dolphins (second stint) ===
On July 27, 2022, Ellis signed with the Miami Dolphins. He was waived/injured on August 16 and placed on injured reserve. Ellis was released by the Dolphins on August 24. He was re-signed to the team's practice squad on October 10.

Ellis signed a reserve/future contract with Miami on January 16, 2023. He was waived/injured by the Dolphins on August 21, and placed on injured reserve.

== Modeling and television ==
Following his career in professional football, Ellis transitioned into the fashion industry, signing with ONE Management in their New York City and Chicago markets. He later expanded his representation by signing with NEXT Management in Miami. As a model, Ellis has appeared in commercial campaigns for New Balance, Joe Fresh Goods, Under Armour, and Sketchers. In addition to fashion, he has pursued work in physical acting, maintaining a professional profile for productions.

In June 2026, Ellis appeared on the eighth season of the reality show Love Island USA, but was eliminated after less than a day on the show.
