= Clay, Alabama =

City in Alabama, United States

- City
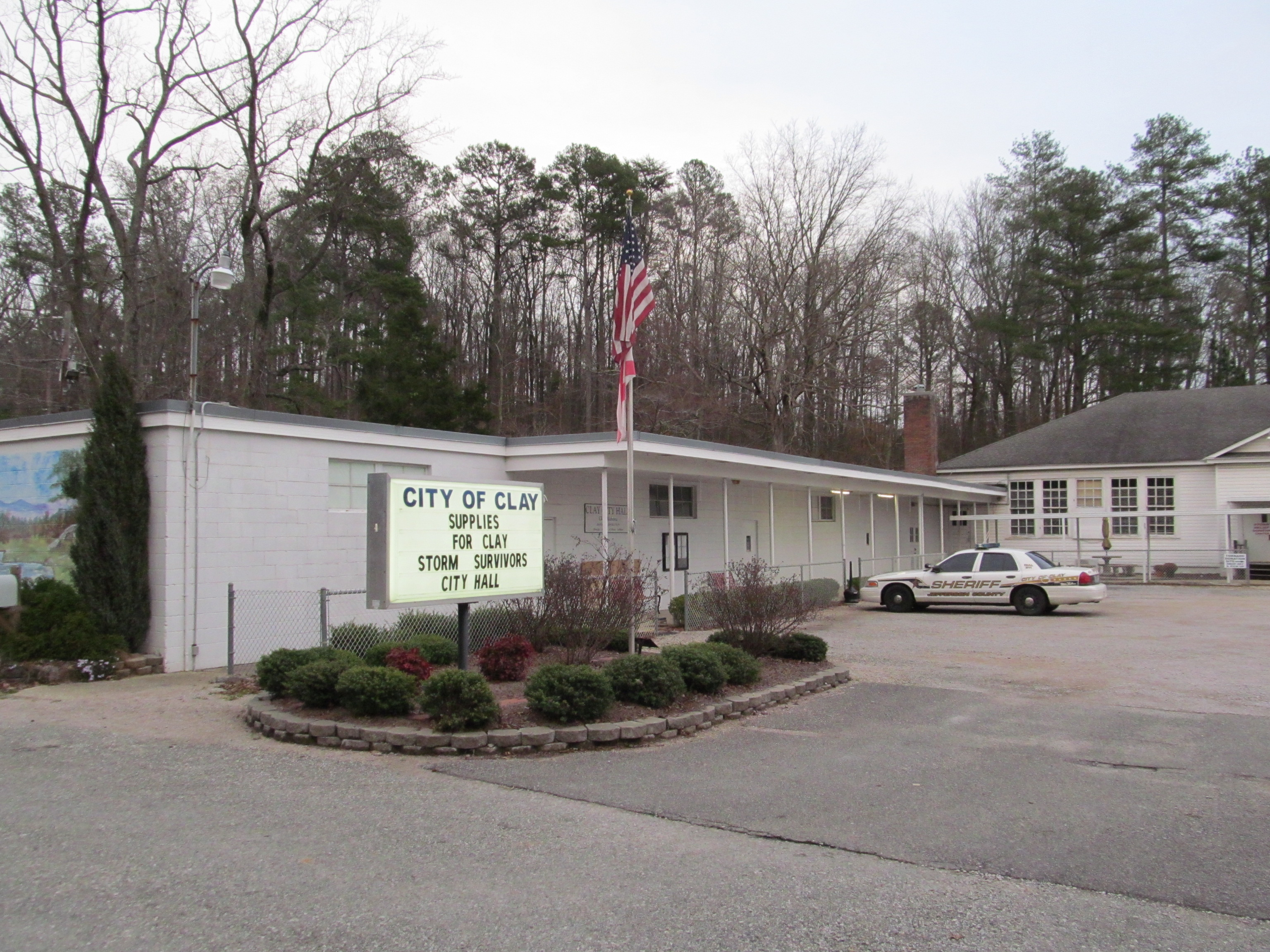
- City Hall

- Seal

- Location of Clay in Jefferson County, Alabama.
- Coordinates: 33°42′35″N 86°37′12″W
- Country: United States
- State: Alabama
- County: Jefferson

Area
  - Total: 11.34 sq mi (29.38 km^{2})
  - Land: 11.28 sq mi (29.21 km^{2})
  - Water: 0.066 sq mi (0.17 km^{2})
- Elevation: 1,014 ft (309 m)

Population (2020)
  - Total: 10,291
  - Density: 912.4/sq mi (352.27/km^{2})
- Time zone: UTC-6 (Central (CST))
  - Summer (DST): UTC-5 (CDT)
- ZIP code: 35048
- Area codes: 205 & 659
- FIPS code: 01-15256
- GNIS feature ID: 2404063
- Website: http://www.clayalabama.org/

Clay is a city in northeastern Jefferson County, Alabama, United States. It is part of the Birmingham–Hoover–Cullman Combined Statistical Area in the north-central part of the state. Local government is run by a mayor and city council. As of the 2020 census, Clay had a population of 10,291.

Before incorporation on June 6, 2000, it was a census-designated place (CDP).

The oldest church in Jefferson County, Mount Calvary Presbyterian Church, is located in Clay. The congregation has been meeting continually since 1806, when it was established by early Scots-American settlers.

On January 23, 2012, a total of 231 homes and businesses were either damaged or destroyed when an EF3 tornado passed through several subdivisions. Damage was heavy in downtown Center Point. Some of the homes were flattened. Trees were snapped and uprooted along the path and the Center Point Elementary School was damaged. A sixteen-year-old student from Jefferson County International Baccalaureate School died before reaching cover during the tornado.

== Geography ==
According to the U.S. Census Bureau, the CDP had a total area of 10.3 square miles (27 km^{2}), of which 10.3 square miles (27 km^{2}) was land and 0.04 square miles (0.10 km^{2}) (0.29%) was water.

== Media ==
The local newspaper is The Trussville Tribune. The Tribune, which covers government, sports, crime, and community events in Trussville, Clay and Pinson, is published each Wednesday. It provides current news online.

== Demographics ==
Historical population
| Census | Pop. | Note | %± |
|---|---|---|---|
| 1990 | 10,987 | | — |
| 2000 | 4,947 | | −55.0% |
| 2010 | 9,708 | | 96.2% |
| 2020 | 10,291 | | 6.0% |
| 2025 (est.) | 10,198 | ▼ | −0.9% |
U.S. Decennial Census

Note: Census demographic data were enumerated for the Census-Designated Place (CDP) for somewhat different boundaries prior to incorporation. The 1990 population of 10,987 was for the CDP of Pinson-Clay-Chalkville, which was subdivided in 2000 into their own separate CDPs. Therefore, exact population for the Clay portion in 1990 cannot be ascertained

=== Racial and ethnic composition ===
Clay city, Alabama – Racial and ethnic composition Note: the US Census treats Hispanic/Latino as an ethnic category. This table excludes Latinos from the racial categories and assigns them to a separate category. Hispanics/Latinos may be of any race.
| Race / Ethnicity (NH = Non-Hispanic) | Pop 2000 | Pop 2010 | Pop 2020 | % 2000 | % 2010 | % 2020 |
|---|---|---|---|---|---|---|
| White alone (NH) | 4,832 | 8,093 | 5,560 | 97.68% | 83.36% | 54.03% |
| Black or African American alone (NH) | 34 | 1,287 | 3,766 | 0.69% | 13.26% | 36.60% |
| Native American or Alaska Native alone (NH) | 15 | 28 | 20 | 0.30% | 0.29% | 0.19% |
| Asian alone (NH) | 20 | 59 | 87 | 0.40% | 0.61% | 0.85% |
| Native Hawaiian or Pacific Islander alone (NH) | 0 | 3 | 5 | 0.00% | 0.03% | 0.05% |
| Other race alone (NH) | 2 | 14 | 24 | 0.04% | 0.14% | 0.23% |
| Mixed race or Multiracial (NH) | 24 | 97 | 425 | 0.49% | 1.00% | 4.13% |
| Hispanic or Latino (any race) | 20 | 127 | 404 | 0.40% | 1.31% | 3.93% |
| Total | 4,947 | 9,708 | 10,291 | 100.00% | 100.00% | 100.00% |

=== 2020 census ===
As of the 2020 census, Clay had a population of 10,291, with 3,862 households and 2,674 families. The median age was 40.7 years. 21.8% of residents were under the age of 18 and 16.7% of residents were 65 years of age or older. For every 100 females there were 94.3 males, and for every 100 females age 18 and over there were 90.7 males age 18 and over.

74.3% of residents lived in urban areas, while 25.7% lived in rural areas.

There were 3,862 households in Clay, of which 32.9% had children under the age of 18 living in them. Of all households, 56.3% were married-couple households, 13.4% were households with a male householder and no spouse or partner present, and 25.5% were households with a female householder and no spouse or partner present. About 21.1% of all households were made up of individuals and 9.7% had someone living alone who was 65 years of age or older.

There were 4,049 housing units, of which 4.6% were vacant. The homeowner vacancy rate was 1.7% and the rental vacancy rate was 10.3%.

Racial composition as of the 2020 census
| Race | Number | Percent |
|---|---|---|
| White | 5,609 | 54.5% |
| Black or African American | 3,790 | 36.8% |
| American Indian and Alaska Native | 38 | 0.4% |
| Asian | 89 | 0.9% |
| Native Hawaiian and Other Pacific Islander | 5 | 0.0% |
| Some other race | 180 | 1.7% |
| Two or more races | 580 | 5.6% |
| Hispanic or Latino (of any race) | 404 | 3.9% |

=== 2010 census ===
At the 2010 census, there were 9,708 people, 3,574 households, and 2,780 families living in the city. The population density was 480 inhabitants per square mile (190/km^{2}). There were 3,799 housing units at an average density of 368.8 per square mile (142.4/km^{2}). The racial makeup of the city was 84.1% White, 13.3% Black or African American, 0.3% Native American, 0.6% Asian, 0.6% from other races, and 1.1% from two or more races. 1.3% of the population were Hispanic or Latino of any race.

Of the 3,574 households 32.4% had children under the age of 18 living with them, 64.3% were married couples living together, 9.7% had a female householder with no husband present, and 22.2% were non-families. 20.0% of households were one person and 9.2% were one person aged 65 or older. The average household size was 2.72 and the average family size was 3.13.

The age distribution was 23.9% under the age of 18, 8.8% from 18 to 24, 24.2% from 25 to 44, 31.9% from 45 to 64, and 11.1% 65 or older. The median age was 40.1 years. For every 100 females, there were 94.3 males. For every 100 females age 18 and over, there were 95.5 males.

The median household income was $70,273 and the median family income was $82,911. Males had a median income of $52,800 versus $42,813 for females. The per capita income for the city was $28,000. About 1.7% of families and 3.6% of the population were below the poverty line, including 4.7% of those under age 18 and 8.7% of those age 65 or over.

=== 2000 census ===
At the 2000 census, there were 4,947 people, 1,636 households, and 1,421 families living in the CDP. The population density was 479.7 inhabitants per square mile (185.2/km^{2}). There were 1,683 housing units at an average density of 163.2 per square mile (63.0/km^{2}). The racial makeup of the CDP was 97.96% White, 0.71% Black or African American, 0.30% Native American, 0.40% Asian, 0.12% from other races, and 0.51% from two or more races. 0.40% of the population were Hispanic or Latino of any race.

Of the 1,636 households 49.3% had children under the age of 18 living with them, 76.4% were married couples living together, 8.3% had a female householder with no husband present, and 13.1% were non-families. 11.2% of households were one person and 3.9% were one person aged 65 or older. The average household size was 3.02 and the average family size was 3.26.

The age distribution was 30.7% under the age of 18, 7.4% from 18 to 24, 33.6% from 25 to 44, 22.4% from 45 to 64, and 5.9% 65 or older. The median age was 35 years. For every 100 females, there were 98.0 males. For every 100 females age 18 and over, there were 94.9 males.

The median household income was $61,042 and the median family income was $64,798. Males had a median income of $40,092 versus $28,787 for females. The per capita income for the CDP was $21,323. About 3.9% of families and 4.5% of the population were below the poverty line, including 6.3% of those under age 18 and 11.7% of those age 65 or over.

== Notable people ==
- Nico Collins, NFL player
- Clayne Crawford, actor
- Courtney Porter, Miss Alabama 2011
- YBN Nahmir, rapper
