= Tornadoes of 1998 =

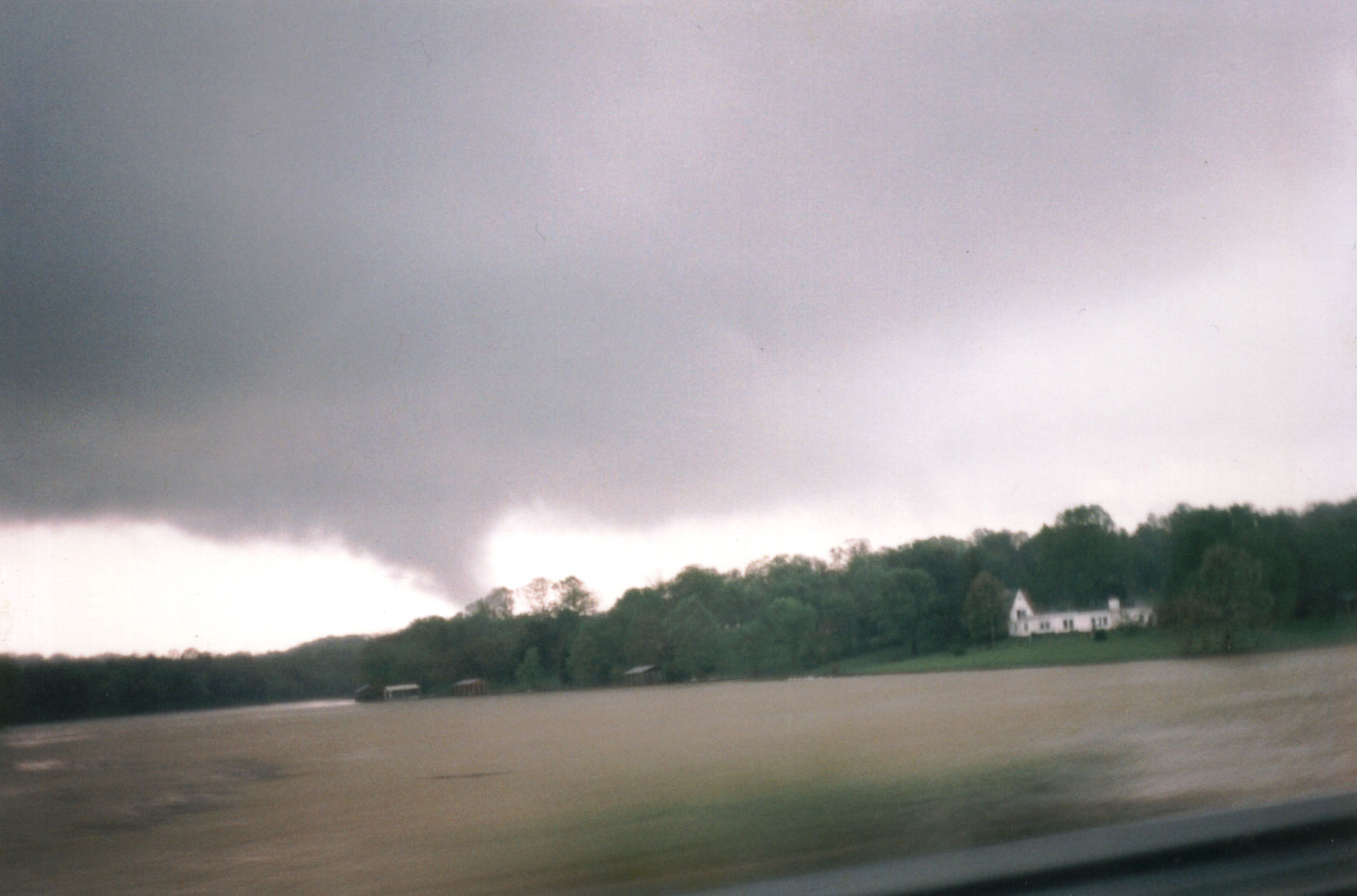
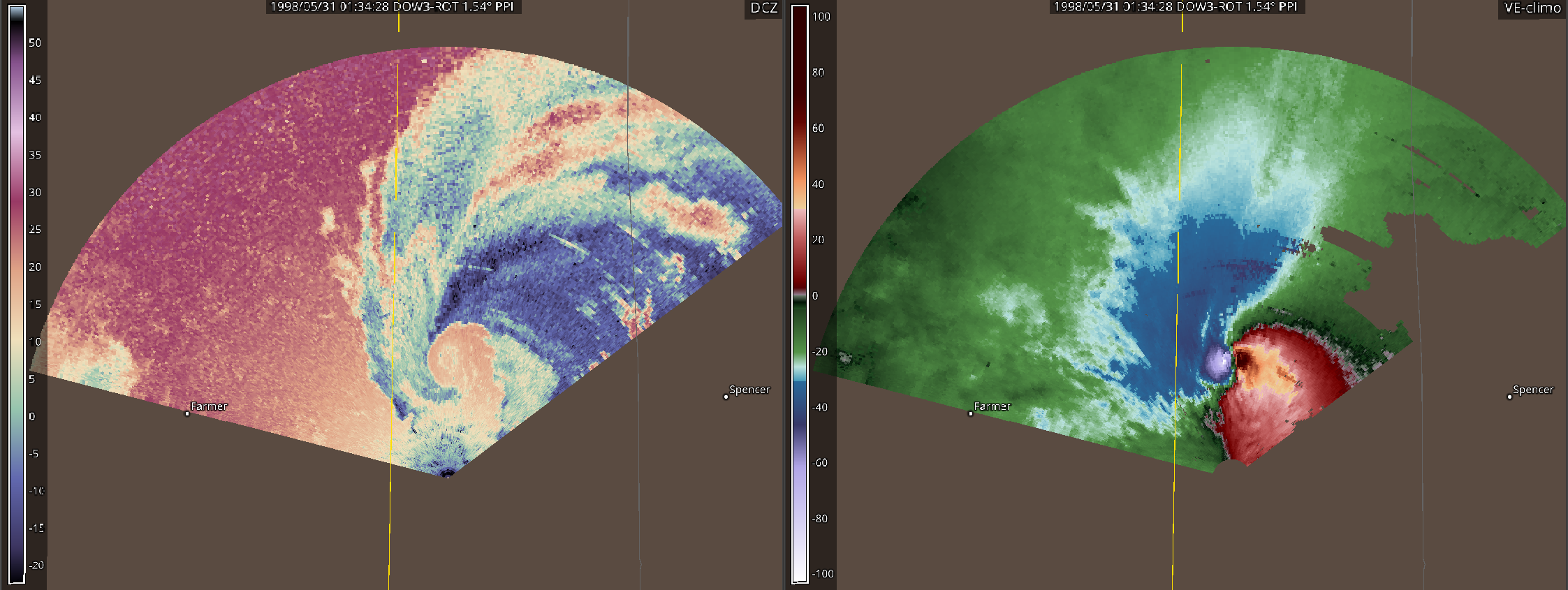
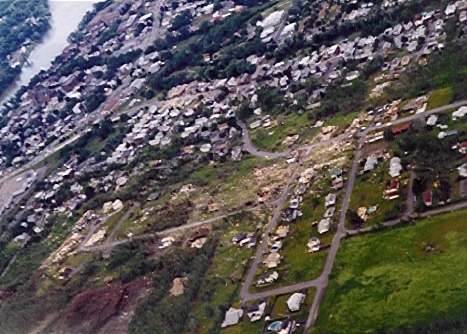
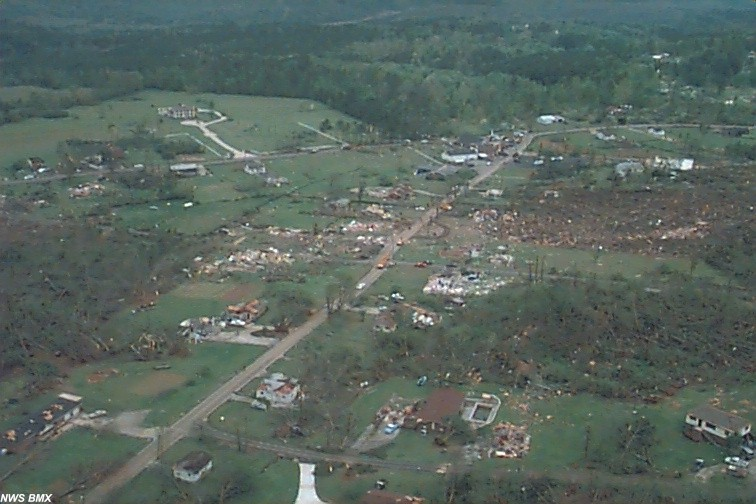
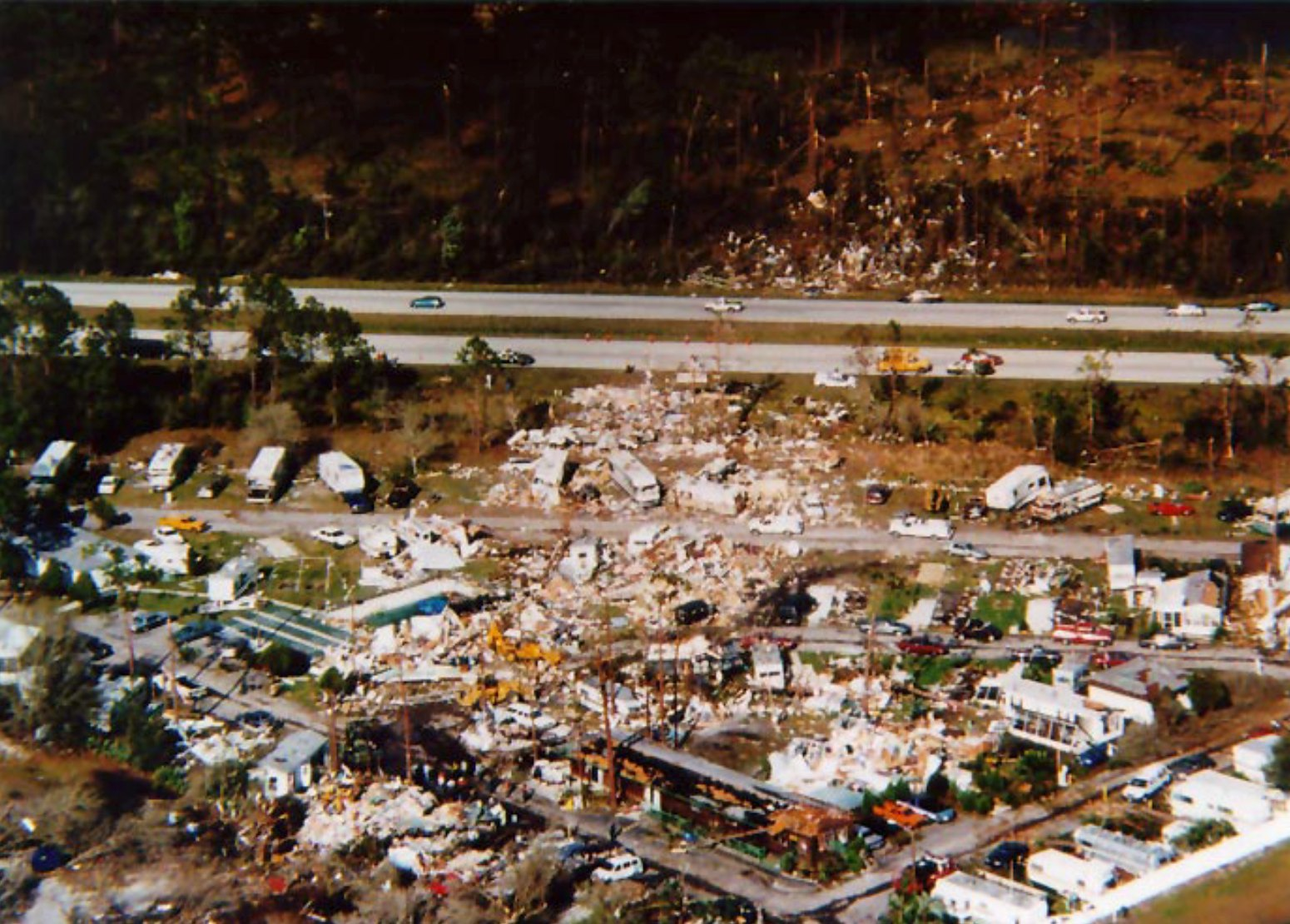
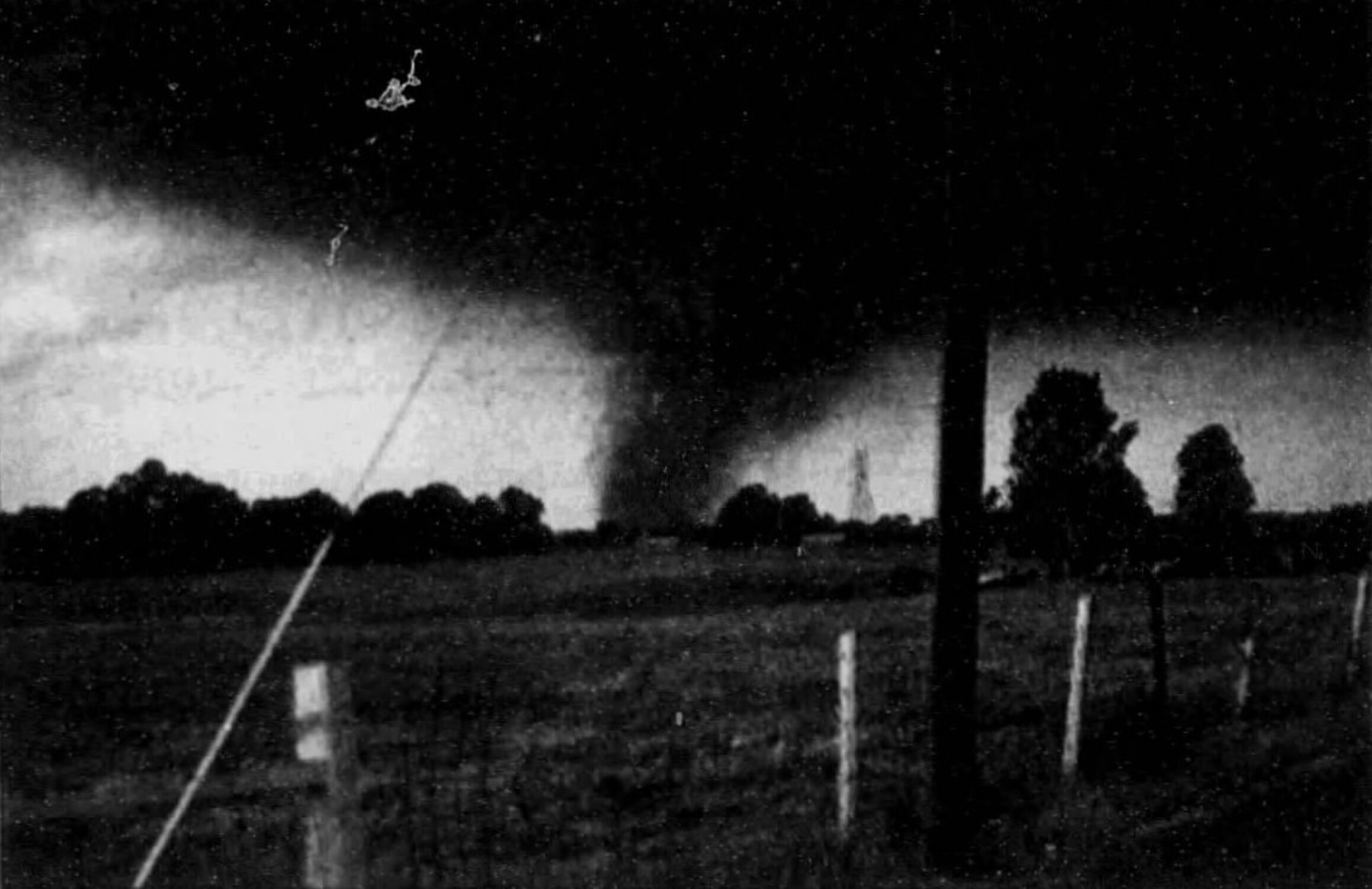
- Clockwise from top: An intense F3 tornado shortly after leaving Nashville, Tennessee on April 16; An aerial photo of Mechanicville, New York after an F3 tornado on May 31; An RV park after an F3 tornado struck Kissimmee, Florida on February 22; A large F4 tornado in rural Hancock County, Indiana on June 11; An aerial photo showing F5 damage in Rock Creek, Alabama after a tornado on April 8; Doppler on Wheels (DOW) mobile radar data of a destructive F4 tornado that struck Spencer, South Dakota on May 30.
- Timespan: January – December 1998
- Maximum rated tornado: F5 tornado: Birmingham, Alabama on April 8; Lawrenceburg, Tennessee on April 16
- Tornadoes in U.S.: 1,424
- Damage (U.S.): $1.72 billion
- Fatalities (U.S.): 130
- Fatalities (worldwide): >380

This page documents the tornadoes and tornado outbreaks of 1998, primarily in the United States. Most tornadoes form in the U.S., although some events may take place internationally. Tornado statistics for older years like this often appear significantly lower than modern years due to fewer reports or confirmed tornadoes, however by the 1990s tornado statistics were coming closer to the numbers we see today.

== Synopsis ==
Fatal United States tornadoes in 1998
- Approximate touchdown location of killer tornadoes in 1998
Summary of tornadoes
- February 22 – Florida (1 death)
- February 23 – Florida (3 deaths)
- February 23 – Florida (13 deaths)
- February 23 – Florida (25 deaths)
- March 20 – Georgia (12 deaths)
- March 20 – North Carolina (2 deaths)
- March 29 – Minnesota (1 death)
- March 29 – Minnesota (1 death)
- April 1 – Virginia (2 deaths)
- April 8 – Alabama (32 deaths)
- April 8 – Alabama (2 deaths)
- April 8 – Georgia (1 death)
- April 9 – Georgia (2 deaths)
- April 9 – Georgia (4 deaths)
- April 16 – Arkansas (2 deaths)
- April 16 – Tennessee (2 deaths)
- April 16 – Tennessee (1 death)
- April 16 – Kentucky (2 deaths)
- April 16 – Tennessee (3 deaths)
- April 16 – Kentucky (1 death)
- April 16 – Tennessee (1 death)
- May 7 – South Carolina (1 death)
- May 10 – South Carolina (1 death)
- May 15 – Minnesota (1 death)
- May 30 – South Dakota (6 deaths)
- May 31 – Pennsylvania (1 death)
- June 2 – Pennsylvania (2 deaths)
- June 27 – Ohio (1 death)
- September 3 – South Carolina (1 death)
- September 10 – Louisiana (1 death)
- October 17 – Texas (1 death)
- October 18 – Texas (1 death)
Total fatalities: 130

The 1998 tornado season saw record numbers of tornadoes and also the most fatalities since 1974 (surpassed in 2011). A number of tornado events resulted in large loss of life. In February, a series of tornadoes caused 42 fatalities in Florida. In March, a tornado killed 12 in Georgia. In April, an F5 tornado killed 32 in the Birmingham, Alabama area. By year's end, 130 people had been killed in the United States.

== Events ==
Confirmed tornado total for the entire year 1998 in the United States.

Confirmed tornadoes by Fujita rating
FU	F0	F1	F2	F3	F4	F5	Total
0	883	382	116	35	6	2	1,424

== January ==
There were 47 tornadoes confirmed in the U.S. in January.

=== January 7-8 (United Kingdom) ===
At 23:49 on 7 January, a waterspout made landfall on the west side of Selsey Bill before travelling east until it reached the sea on the other side of the bill. Whilst it was on land, the tornado caused £5-10 million in damage as it went through the town of Selsey in West Sussex. It was rated T3 on the TORRO scale, with T4 possibly reached in some places. A second tornado was later formed by the same storm further down the coast in Peacehaven, East Sussex, over 55 km (34 mi) away.

== February ==
There were 72 tornadoes confirmed in the U.S. in February.

=== February 2–3 ===
An area of severe weather moved across southern Florida, resulting in four confirmed tornadoes. An F2 tornado touched down on the north edge of Miami International Airport, with a measured wind gust of 104 mph (167 km/h). It strengthened to peak intensity as it moved across Opa Locka Airport, eventually moving into North Perry Airport in Pembroke Pines. At those three airports, 235 aircraft were destroyed and damaged. Severe damage also occurred in residential areas and business districts.

=== February 9–12 ===
The Storm Prediction Center issued an extremely rare February high risk day for February 10. A rare derecho then affected parts of Texas, Louisiana and Mississippi, producing widespread damaging winds and 22 tornadoes.

=== February 22–23 ===
The most devastating tornado outbreak to ever occur in Florida in terms of loss of life and property damage, occurred from Kissimmee to Sanford. Three of the tornadoes in the outbreak were rated F3. One in particular touched down in northwest Osceola County struck parts of Kissimmee, with the worst damage seen in the southern, eastern, and northeastern parts of the city. It dissipated in Orange County, and was rated an F3. The first tornado, rated F2, caused a fatality and three injuries.

FU	F0	F1	F2	F3	F4	F5
0	7	3	2	3	0	0

== March ==
There were 72 tornadoes confirmed in the U.S. in March.

=== March 7–9 ===
FU	F0	F1	F2	F3	F4	F5
0	14	9	39	0	0	0

A large storm system produced 26 tornadoes across the southeast. In addition, heavy snow was reported in Chicago and heavy rain caused flooding.

=== March 20 ===
FU	F0	F1	F2	F3	F4	F5
0	3	4	3	2	0	0

A deadly tornado outbreak struck portions of the Southeastern United States on March 20. Particularly hard hit was Gainesville, Georgia, where at least 12 people were killed in an early morning F3 tornado. The entire outbreak killed 14 people and produced 12 tornadoes across three states with the town of Stoneville, North Carolina also being hard hit by the storms.

=== March 24 (India) ===
A brief but extremely deadly tornado hit West Bengal in India, killing 250 people. This was the deadliest tornado on record in India.

=== March 28 ===
FU	F0	F1	F2	F3	F4	F5
0	3	2	1	0	0	0

An F2 tornado touched down at approximately 5:25 AM in the town of Mattoon, Illinois. Winds reached around 152 miles per hour and damaged over 90 homes; eight homes and six businesses were destroyed. Tornado Warnings were in effect but had expired at 5:00 AM leaving no warning from tornado sirens or trained spotters in the field. Unusually, the tornado spawned at the back end of a storm instead of the front. At least three people were injured.

=== March 29 ===
FU	F0	F1	F2	F3	F4	F5
0	6	3	5	1	1	0

An unseasonably-strong tornado outbreak affected the Upper Midwest on March 29. 16 tornadoes struck across the region—14 in Minnesota and two in Wisconsin. 13 of the tornadoes in Minnesota were spawned by a single supercell thunderstorm. Two people were killed, and 21 others were injured. Most of the damage was caused by three tornadoes: an F4 tornado that hit the town of Comfrey, Minnesota, an F3 tornado that struck St. Peter, Minnesota, and an F2 tornado that hit Le Center, Minnesota.

== April ==
There were 182 tornadoes confirmed in the U.S. in April.

=== April 6–9 ===
FU	F0	F1	F2	F3	F4	F5
0	39	13	7	2	0	1

An extremely violent F5 tornado started North of Kellerman, Alabama and traveled through Northern Jefferson County, before dissipating in Northern Pratt City. The F5 tornado produced catastrophic damage in Oak Grove, McDonald Chapel, and the small community of Edgewater. The same supercell that spawned the Birmingham F5 spawned an F2 that continued into neighboring St. Clair County, killing two people. A high-end F2 tornado struck Dunwoody, Georgia, a northern suburb of metro Atlanta late on April 8, striking parts of DeKalb and Gwinnett Counties. It is one of the strongest and most damaging tornadoes ever recorded to have hit the area.

In all, 62 tornadoes touched down from the Midwestern United States and Texas to the Mid-Atlantic. The outbreak was responsible for at least 41 deaths, with seven in Georgia and 34 in Alabama.

=== April 15–16 ===
FU	F0	F1	F2	F3	F4	F5
0	25	17	10	7	3	1

A two-day tornado outbreak affected portions of the Midwestern United States, Mississippi and Tennessee Valleys on April 15–16, with the worst of the outbreak taking place on the second day. On that day, at least 10 tornadoes swept through Middle Tennessee—three of them touching down in Nashville, causing significant damage to the downtown and East Nashville areas. Nashville became the first major city in nearly 20 years to have an F2+ tornado make a direct hit in the downtown area.

In addition, the outbreak produced several other destructive tornadoes in Middle Tennessee. One of them, southwest of Nashville, was an F5 tornado—one of only two ever recorded in the state. That tornado remained mainly in rural areas of Wayne and Lawrence Counties. Other tornadoes during the 2-day outbreak struck Arkansas, Alabama, Illinois and Kentucky.

12 people were killed by tornadoes during the outbreak, including two in Arkansas, three in Kentucky, and seven in Tennessee.

== May ==
There were 310 tornadoes confirmed in the U.S. in May.

=== May 4 ===
Two rare, anticyclonic tornadoes struck Los Altos and Sunnyvale in Santa Clara County, California (Silicon Valley).

=== May 7 ===
A tornado outbreak in the Southeast spawned 20 tornadoes in North Carolina, including an F3 tornado in Clemmons and an F4 tornado in Caldwell County.

=== May 15 ===
FU	F0	F1	F2	F3	F4	F5
0	0	5	0	0	0	0

A large squall line with embedded supercells crossed much of Minnesota, producing large hail, destructive downburst winds, and five weak, but damaging F1 tornadoes, which killed one and injured 31. In all, the storms caused $1.5 billion (1998 USD) in damage.

Early on May 15, 1998, a stationary front was positioned from the western border of Minnesota, southward to Kansas. To the east of the stationary front, temperatures and dew points were unseasonably high. Several Minnesota cities reported record high dew points (including the Twin Cities at 70 °F (21 °C)) and low–minimum temperates for May 15. A deepening area of low pressure over Kansas ejected to the north, moving along the stationary front. Behind the low pressure area was much cooler and drier air. The clash of these two differing air masses was the impetus for the development of the severe weather.

A squall line moving at speeds to 70 miles per hour (113 km/h) with embedded supercells entered Minnesota from the southwest during the early afternoon hours, and raced northward across most of the state.

A separate storm system in Iowa spawned several tornadoes including a dusty F3 tornado that impacted Lone Tree, causing significant damage and injuring 47 people with 28 in Washington County, 17 in Johnson County and 2 in Cedar County. The town of Washington suffered extensive damage to the businesses, houses, apartment complex, the town's church and livestock sale barn, 27 people were injured in the town itself and one more injury occurred outside of the town as the tornado rolled over a car and the same storm that produced the Washington F3 would go on to produce a skipping tornado southwest of Benton, Wisconsin where the tornado left moderate to severe damage to 40 farms and downing powerlines, 11 people were injured by this tornado. From the earlier storm systems in Iowa, an intermittent F2 tornado impacted the town of Algona, destroying two homes and fifteen farms. A much more separate storm system struck Wisconsin, producing a F3 tornado that impacted east of Durand, destroying a trailer home and collapsing a home before lifting, a F1 tornado would go on to produce severe damage to the chemical fertilizer plant northwest of Elk Mound before destroying a house alongside a mobile home near Elk Mound.

=== May 30–31 ===
FU	F0	F1	F2	F3	F4	F5
0	7	8	3	0	1	0

A historic tornado outbreak and derecho began on the afternoon of May 30 and lasted into the next day. It affected a large portion of the northern half of the United States and Southern Ontario from Southeastern Montana east-southeastward to the Atlantic Ocean. The initial tornado outbreak, including the devastating Spencer tornado, hit Southeast South Dakota on the evening of May 30. The Spencer tornado was the most destructive and second deadliest tornado in South Dakota history. 13 people were killed; seven by tornadoes and six by the derecho, and damage was estimated to be at least $500 million. Over two million people lost electrical power, some for up to 10 days.

== June ==
There were 376 tornadoes confirmed in the U.S. in June.

=== June 2 ===
FU	F0	F1	F2	F3	F4	F5
0	15	22	7	2	1	0

The most significant tornado outbreak in recent history over the east-central United States occurred on June 2. This severe weather event spawned a total of 50 tornadoes from New York to South Carolina and caused an estimated $42 million in damage, 80 injuries and two fatalities. For portions of New York, New Jersey and Pennsylvania, it was the second historic severe weather outbreak in three days, as it immediately followed the Late-May 1998 tornado outbreak and derecho on May 30–31, which spawned 41 tornadoes over New York, New Jersey, Pennsylvania and Vermont, caused an estimated $83 million in damage, 109 injuries and one fatality.

=== June 13 ===
FU	F0	F1	F2	F3	F4	F5
0	32	10	3	0	0	0

June 13 saw over 40 tornadoes touchdown in the United States, primarily across Kansas, Nebraska, and Oklahoma. Significant tornadoes include an F2 which struck Downtown Sabetha, Kansas, and four tornadoes which struck the North Oklahoma City area.

=== June 19 (Belarus) ===
An extremely large F3 tornado swept across Vas'kovka, Belarus, flattening thousands of trees in its path and destroying several houses on the outskirts of the village.

=== June 23 ===
A very large F2 tornado occurred in the open countryside near Columbus, Nebraska, slowly churning through fields and destroying a few farmsteads. One house was blown off its foundation.

=== June 29 ===
Along with a long-lived derecho that affected areas from South Dakota to Iowa, 20 tornadoes were reported, one of which was an F2 tornado, injuring 85 people in central Iowa. Over eight states, the derecho and associated tornadoes killed one person and injured 174.

== July ==
There were 82 tornadoes confirmed in the U.S. in July.

== August ==
There were 61 tornadoes confirmed in the U.S. in August.

=== August 23 ===
FU	F0	F1	F2	F3	F4	F5
0	2	0	0	1	0	0

An F3 tornado impacted Egg Harbor, Wisconsin, causing an estimated $6.5 million in damages. It was part of a severe weather outbreak that produced two other weak tornadoes.

== September ==
There were 104 tornadoes confirmed in the U.S. in September.

=== September 24–30 ===
FU	F0	F1	F2	F3	F4	F5
0	26	20	1	0	0	0

Hurricane Georges triggered a six-day tornado outbreak as it moved through Southeastern United States. Most of the tornadoes produced by the storm formed in the outer bands of the storm and were relatively weak; however, one F2 tornado touched down in Florida. The outbreak produced 47 tornadoes—20 in Alabama, 17 in Florida and 10 in Georgia—and was the most extensive tornado event in Florida history, with touchdowns reported throughout the entire length of the state.

== October ==
There were 86 tornadoes confirmed in the U.S. in October.

=== October 4 ===
FU	F0	F1	F2	F3	F4	F5
0	11	9	8	1	0	0

October 4 saw 29 tornadoes touch down in the United States, 26 of which struck Oklahoma. The day was Oklahoma's largest October tornado outbreak on record. Thunderstorms initially developed over Northwestern Oklahoma during the mid-to-late afternoon hours. The first tornado, rated F2, touched down in Southeastern Woods County to the south-southwest of the town of Dacoma. The tornado then tracked northeast, causing damage to an abandoned house and destroying a barn and garage. Entering Alfalfa County, the tornado then destroyed an office building and a gas plant and blew the roof off a nearby modular home. Multiple witnesses reported this multiple-vortex tornado to have been at least a quarter of a mile wide. The second tornado, rated F0, touched down southeast of Cherokee in Alfalfa County where it was spotted by a county sheriff's deputy. An F0 tornado was spotted by a state trooper and was on the ground for less than one minute near SH-11 west of Medford and caused no known damage.

=== October 27 (United Kingdom) ===
An F1 tornado struck the village of Cowshill, County Durham. Damage to the village was reported.

== November ==
There were 26 tornadoes confirmed in the U.S. in November.

== December ==
There were 6 tornadoes confirmed in the U.S. in December.

=== December 15 (South Africa) ===
An F2 tornado hit Umtata, Eastern Cape, South Africa. Roofs and walls were torn from some structures. Eleven people died when the wall of a bus station collapsed.

== See also ==
- Tornado
  - Tornadoes by year
  - Tornado records
  - Tornado climatology
  - Tornado myths
- List of tornado outbreaks
  - List of F5 and EF5 tornadoes
  - List of North American tornadoes and tornado outbreaks
  - List of 21st-century Canadian tornadoes and tornado outbreaks
  - List of European tornadoes and tornado outbreaks
  - List of tornadoes and tornado outbreaks in Asia
  - List of Southern Hemisphere tornadoes and tornado outbreaks
  - List of tornadoes striking downtown areas
- Tornado intensity
  - Fujita scale
  - Enhanced Fujita scale
