= List of tornadoes in the outbreak of April 15–16, 1998 =

Mid-season tornadoes in the United States

The 1998 Nashville tornado outbreak was a two-day tornado outbreak which affected portions of the Midwestern United States, Mississippi, and Tennessee Valleys on April 15 and April 16, 1998, with the worst of the outbreak taking place on the second day. On that day, at least ten tornadoes swept through Middle Tennessee—three of them touching down in Nashville, causing significant damage to the downtown and East Nashville areas. Nashville became the first major city in nearly 20 years to have an F2 or larger tornado make a direct hit in the downtown area.

== Confirmed tornadoes ==
Confirmed tornadoes by Fujita rating
FU	F0	F1	F2	F3	F4	F5	Total
0	25	17	10	7	3	1	63

=== April 15 event ===
List of confirmed tornadoes – Wednesday, April 15, 1998 (Note: All dates are based on the local time zone where the tornado touched down; however, all times are in Coordinated Universal Time for consistency.)
F#	Location	County / Parish	State	Start Coord.	Time (UTC)	Path length	Max width	Summary
F0	N of Hoopole	Henry	IL	41.53°N 89.92°W	20:50	0.1 mi (160 m)	10 yd (9.1 m)	Brief tornado caused minor damage to a corn field.
F0	W of Viola	Mercer	IL	41.20°N 90.60°W	22:00	0.1 mi (160 m)	10 yd (9.1 m)	Brief touchdown with no damage.
F0	W of Red Bud	Monroe	IL	38.20°N 90.08°W	22:47–22:48	0.1 mi (160 m)	50 yd (46 m)	Brief touchdown in an open field with no damage.
F0	S of Marissa	St. Clair	IL	38.23°N 89.75°W	23:12	0.2 mi (320 m)	10 yd (9.1 m)	Bleachers in a baseball field were destroyed, a dumpster was blown damaging the side of a building, and a few trees were downed.
F0	NE of Coulterville (1st tornado)	Washington	IL	38.20°N 89.58°W	23:32–23:33	0.2 mi (320 m)	20 yd (18 m)	Brief tornado in open country.
F0	NE of Coulterville (2nd tornado)	Perry	IL	38.20°N 89.58°W	23:32	1 mi (1.6 km)	50 yd (46 m)	Brief tornado videotaped moving through open fields.
F0	SE of Waterloo to Fayetteville	Monroe, St. Clair	IL	38.27°N 90.07°W	00:05–00:25	15 mi (24 km)	50 yd (46 m)	An ambulance was overturned and several trees were downed.
F1	E of Hoyleton	Washington	IL	38.43°N 89.27°W	00:30–00:40	2 mi (3.2 km)	50 yd (46 m)	A barn and a few farm buildings were destroyed, and several trees were downed.
F2	ESE of Irvington to N of Walnut Hill	Jefferson, Marion	IL	38.42°N 89.08°W	00:43–00:50	5.5 mi (8.9 km)	350 yd (320 m)	Several outbuildings and barns were destroyed, nine homes sustained major damage, and several mobile homes were overturned. Several trees were downed. A man was injured when his tractor-trailer was picked up and overturned.
F2	NE of Walnut Hill	Marion	IL	38.50°N 89.03°W	00:52–01:00	4 mi (6.4 km)	300 yd (270 m)	At least ten homes were damaged, and over a dozen barns and farm buildings and two mobile homes were destroyed. Two tractor-trailers were overturned as well.
F1	NW of Kell to SE of Iuka	Marion	IL	38.50°N 88.95°W	01:05–01:20	9 mi (14 km)	250 yd (230 m)	Eight homes were damaged, a mobile home was destroyed, and 18 barns and farm buildings were either heavily damaged or destroyed. Many trees were downed along the path.
F1	SW of Marquand	Madison	MO	37.35°N 90.42°W	01:39–?	12 mi (19 km)	100 yd (91 m)	A barn and several outbuildings were damaged, and many trees were downed.
F2	SW of Flora to NW of Clay City	Clay	IL	38.65°N 88.53°W	01:45–02:00	9.5 mi (15.3 km)	150 yd (140 m)	The tornado moved through Flora, derailing 60 to 70 train cars, destroying a set of railroad crossing signals, caused roof and structural damage to numerous homes, and destroyed a mobile home and several garages and sheds. The mobile home was moved around 100 feet (30 m). On the east side of Flora, 40 to 50 condominiums were damaged, ten businesses in an industrial park were damages, and power poles were downed. Several vehicles in the area were damaged from falling trees and debris, numerous trees were downed, and a mobile home was overturned northwest of Clay City. Eight people sustained minor injuries.
F0	NE of Crosstown	Perry	MO	37.75°N 89.72°W	01:50	0.2 mi (320 m)	20 yd (18 m)	Brief touchdown with no damage.
F2	NW of Clay City to N of Olney	Clay, Richland	IL	38.72°N 88.38°W	02:00–02:25	16 mi (26 km)	150 yd (140 m)	A mobile home and a shed were destroyed, and numerous trees were downed.
F0	W of De Soto	Jackson	IL	37.82°N 89.27°W	02:36	0.3 mi (480 m)	30 yd (27 m)	Brief tornado with no damage.
F0	Clinton	Van Buren	AR	35.58°N 92.48°W	02:45–02:46	2 mi (3.2 km)	100 yd (91 m)	Several trees and tree limbs were knocked down, causing roof damage to a home and knocking down a power line. An outbuilding sustained minor shingle damage as well.
F0	SW of De Soto	Jackson	IL	37.80°N 89.27°W	03:34	0.4 mi (0.64 km)	30 yd (27 m)	Brief tornado with no damage observed by law enforcement.
F0	NW of Pocahontas	Cape Girardeau	MO	37.50°N 89.65°W	04:43–04:44	0.6 mi (0.97 km)	40 yd (37 m)	Brief touchdown with no damage.
F2	NW of Otwell	Pike	IN	38.48°N 87.15°W	05:15–05:20	4 mi (6.4 km)	50 yd (46 m)	Two barns and a few outbuildings were destroyed, two farm houses sustained significant damage, and several trees and power poles were snapped.

=== April 16 event ===
List of confirmed tornadoes – Thursday, April 16, 1998
F#	Location	County / Parish	State	Start Coord.	Time (UTC)	Path length	Max width	Summary
F4	Manila area	Mississippi	AR	35.87°N 90.18°W	07:50–08:10	3.35 to 5 mi (5.39 to 8.05 km)	400 yd (370 m)	2 deaths – The tornado moved northeast through Manila, where several homes, mobile homes, and businesses were heavily damaged or destroyed. A discount department store and a gas station/food mart were flattened, and three small factory and machine shop buildings and a furniture store were destroyed. Several other buildings were seriously damaged, and numerous trees and power lines were blown down. Twelve people were injured.
F1	Blytheville	Mississippi	AR	35.92°N 89.92°W	08:25–08:30	0.5 mi (0.80 km)	50 yd (46 m)	Some homes sustained roof damage, a 60-ton air-conditioner unit on top of a supermarket was moved, and many trees were downed.
F3	E of Dyersburg	Dyer	TN	36.03°N 89.32°W	09:00–09:15	4 mi (6.4 km)	100 yd (91 m)	2 deaths – Three mobile homes were destroyed, including one with the two fatalities. One site-built home was destroyed, with a truck being thrown into it, and several other homes were damaged. Numerous trees and power poles were downed. Three people were injured. Small debris travelled as far as Dyer, about 15 miles (24 km) to the east.
F2	NE of Maury City	Crockett	TN	35.82°N 89.23°W	09:20–09:30	5 mi (8.0 km)	100 yd (91 m)	A mobile home and five farm sheds were destroyed, and seven site-built houses were damaged. Two people were injured.
F3	SE of Tidwell	Dickson	TN	36.00°N 87.33°W	12:05–12:10	2 mi (3.2 km)	1,300 yd (1,200 m)	Seven mobile homes and 35 site-built homes were either damaged or destroyed, a flea market complex lost a wall and part of its roof, trees were downed, and cars were demolished. Five people were injured.
F0	WSW of Lonoke	Pulaski, Lonoke	AR	34.73°N 92.10°W	13:15–13:17	3 mi (4.8 km)	100 yd (91 m)	Numerous homes sustained roof damage, a shed was heavily damaged, a trailer was overturned as destroyed, and many trees were downed.
F3	N of Port Royal to ESE of Adams	Montgomery, Robertson	TN	36.57°N 87.15°W	15:14–15:35	12.5 mi (20.1 km)	400 yd (370 m)	Several homes were damaged and a TVA transmission line tower fell in Montgomery County. In Robertson County, part of the roof of a school was blown off. Many trees and power lines were downed along the path, with many trees landing on homes.
F0	SE of Buffalo	Humphreys	TN	35.88°N 87.82°W	16:09–16:10	0.5 mi (0.80 km)	100 yd (91 m)	Brief tornado with no damage.
F0	Greenfield	Poinsett	AR	35.63°N 90.72°W	16:20	0.2 mi (320 m)	10 yd (9.1 m)	A few trees were downed.
F2	NNW of Lafayette	Macon	TN	36.58°N 86.08°W	17:09–17:15	3 mi (4.8 km)	800 yd (730 m)	A barn and a house sustained roof damage. Many trees and power lines were downed as well. A 2013 reanalysis found that the rating may be too high based on reported damage.
F0	NE of Pegram	Cheatham	TN	36.13°N 87.00°W	20:14	0.5 mi (0.80 km)	100 yd (91 m)	No damage was reported. A 2013 reanalysis noted that this may have been a false tornado report.
F3	West Nashville to NW of Lebanon	Davidson, Wilson	TN	36.07°N 86.92°W	20:26–?	28 mi (45 km)	1,320 yd (1,210 m)	1 death – See section on this tornado – 60 people were injured.
F3	NW of Russellville to E of Glasgow	Logan, Warren, Allen, Barren	KY	36.95°N 86.78°W	20:35–21:50	48 mi (77 km)	200 yd (180 m)	2 deaths – A house was destroyed, and 45 others were severely damaged. 35 mobile homes and 25 barns were also heavily damaged or destroyed. The fatalities and the heaviest damage was in Glasgow. A total of 146 homes and 50 barns were affected in Barren County alone. The supercell produced another tornado in Metcalfe County shortly afterward.
F1	NW of Applegate to Port Sanilac	Sanilac	MI	43.37°N 82.68°W	20:57–21:05	7.5 mi (12.1 km)	100 yd (91 m)	Four homes, ten barns, five silos, and a grain bin were destroyed, and twelve homes and six barns were damaged. The marina in Port Sanilac sustained significant damage, and a horse was fatally injured. The tornado continued over Lake Huron and became a waterspout.
F1	NW of Lebanon to SSE of Hartsville	Wilson, Trousdale	TN	36.25°N 86.41°W	21:05–?	15.9 mi (25.6 km)	200 yd (180 m)	Trees were downed. This was originally considered part of the Nashville tornado, but a 2013 reanalysis determined that one dissipated and this one formed just to the east.
F0	SW of Henderson	Chester	TN	35.43°N 88.67°W	21:33–21:40	1 mi (1.6 km)	25 yd (23 m)	Brief tornado touchdown.
F1	WNW of Shaw	Bolivar	MS	33.60°N 90.87°W	21:47–22:00	4 mi (6.4 km)	100 yd (91 m)	A house was heavily damaged, windows were blown out of mobile homes, and a couple boats were flipped.
F4	SE of Savannah to SE of Waynesboro	Hardin, Wayne	TN	35.13°N 88.13°W	21:50–22:25	30.1 mi (48.4 km)	1,760 yd (1,610 m)	3 deaths – 34 homes were completely destroyed, 14 homes had major damage, and 22 homes had minor damage. Some homes were swept completely off of their foundations. A lumber yard and many mobile homes were destroyed. Many trees were downed as well. Six people were injured. This tornado came from the same supercell that produced the F5 tornado and the other F4 tornado in Tennessee. This tornado may have reached F5 intensity.
F2	Edmonton	Metcalfe	KY	37.00°N 85.70°W	21:53–22:05	8 mi (13 km)	100 yd (91 m)	1 death – 54 structures were destroyed, 43 other suffered major damage, and 19 other sustained minimal damage.
F2	Lebanon	Wilson	TN	36.17°N 86.42°W	21:56–?	9.6 mi (15.4 km)	880 yd (800 m)	Many homes and businesses, including a factory, were damaged in western Lebanon. Trees were downed and fencing was destroyed. 26 outbuildings and 21 vehicles were damaged as well.
F3	E of Portland to NE of Pellyton	Adair	KY	37.12°N 85.43°W	22:15–22:40	20 mi (32 km)	100 yd (91 m)	Fourteen homes were heavily damaged or destroyed, and three mobile homes and 27 barns were destroyed. A total of 30 homes, 84 barns, two schools, and eight businesses were affected. The Pellyton area was most impacted.
F1	Donelson to North Mount Juliet	Davidson, Wilson	TN	36.18°N 86.66°W	22:27–?	9.8 mi (15.8 km)	200 yd (180 m)	Homes were damaged and trees were downed.
F5	WNW of Lawrenceburg to NNE of Ethridge	Wayne, Lawrence	TN	35.29°N 87.58°W	22:30–22:55	19.3 mi (31.1 km)	1,760 yd (1,610 m)	See article on this tornado – 21 people were injured. Considered the only official F5/EF5 to have ever occurred in Tennessee (an unofficial one was in Pinson, Tennessee in 1923). This tornado came from the same supercell that produced the two F4 tornadoes in Tennessee.
F3	SW of Byrdstown to Static	Pickett	TN	36.55°N 85.22°W	22:35–22:50	8.6 mi (13.8 km)	880 yd (800 m)	40 site-built homes, 22 mobile homes, and 100 barns were destroyed. Two greenhouses were heavily damaged, 45 utility poles were blown down, and fences were damaged. Thousands of trees were downed. Four people were injured.
F0	NE of Sunnyside	Leflore	MS	33.70°N 90.28°W	22:35	2 mi (3.2 km)	50 yd (46 m)	Weak tornado over an open field with no damage.
F4	ESE of Summertown to NE of Culleoka	Lawrence, Giles, Maury	TN	35.42°N 87.24°W	23:00–23:30	18.7 mi (30.1 km)	1,320 yd (1,210 m)	The tornado touched down just inside Lawrence County, where trees and power lines were downed, a gas tank was ruptured, cars were overturned, and homes were damaged. Five site-built homes and eight mobile homes were damaged in Giles County. In Maury County, near Culleoka, an 18-wheeler was blown over, many homes were damaged, and several trailers/mobile homes were either damaged or destroyed. Trees and power lines were downed as well. Nine people were injured. This tornado came from the same supercell that produced the F5 tornado and the other F4 tornado across Wayne and Lawrence counties.
F2	E of Jimtown to SW of Whitley City	Wayne, McCreary	KY	36.62°N 84.77°W	23:05–23:30	18.6 mi (29.9 km)	100 yd (91 m)	The tornado moved predominately through the Big South Fork Recreation Area and struck the small community of Smithtown just before lifting. Several homes, mobile homes, outbuildings, and a barn were damaged, and a vehicle was overturned. Numerous trees were downed along the path.
F0	NE of Level Green	Rockcastle	KY	37.30°N 84.42°W	23:35–23:39	0.2 mi (320 m)	30 yd (27 m)	A garage was destroyed, and trees were downed.
F1	SW of Hightogy	Lamar	AL	33.67°N 88.18°W	00:25–00:35	4.9 mi (7.9 km)	75 yd (69 m)	Three homes and several outbuildings and barns were damaged. Numerous trees were snapped or uprooted.
F0	SE of Townley	Walker	AL	33.83°N 87.45°W	01:29–01:31	1.8 mi (2.9 km)	50 yd (46 m)	Several trees were downed.
F0	N of Jasper	Walker	AL	33.87°N 87.30°W	01:36–01:41	4.6 mi (7.4 km)	100 yd (91 m)	A few mobile homes were damaged, and trees and power lines were downed.
F1	NE of Jasper	Walker, Cullman	AL	33.88°N 87.17°W	01:46–01:53	5.5 mi (8.9 km)	110 yd (100 m)	Three mobile homes were destroyed, and four more were damaged. One house sustained major damage, and several more received minor damage. Numerous trees and power lines were down along the path.
F0	SE of Wilburn	Cullman	AL	33.92°N 87.03°W	01:57–02:01	4 mi (6.4 km)	75 yd (69 m)	A few structures were damaged, and numerous trees were downed.
F1	NNE of Arkadelphia to NNE of Colony	Cullman	AL	33.93°N 86.95°W	02:04–02:11	5.8 mi (9.3 km)	90 yd (82 m)	Several houses and outbuildings were damaged, and numerous trees were downed.
F1	S of Garden City	Cullman, Blount	AL	34.00°N 86.77°W	02:15–02:20	3.7 mi (6.0 km)	100 yd (91 m)	One house was heavily damaged and several others had minor damage. Numerous trees were snapped or uprooted.
F0	NE of Oneonta	Blount	AL	34.02°N 86.40°W	02:35–02:39	2.1 mi (3.4 km)	75 yd (69 m)	Numerous trees and tree limbs were snapped off, damaging several homes and barns. Several cows were killed or injured as well.
F1	W of Attalla	Etowah	AL	34.00°N 86.27°W	02:46–02:59	8.4 mi (13.5 km)	150 yd (140 m)	A trailer was flipped over while a barn and another trailer lost their roofs. Several trees were downed, some falling onto homes.
F1	Reece City	Etowah	AL	34.05°N 86.07°W	03:01–03:06	3.1 mi (5.0 km)	100 yd (91 m)	Hundreds of trees were snapped or uprooted, some of which fell on homes.
F1	SE of Flintstone	Walker	GA	34.93°N 85.33°W	03:20	0.5 mi (0.80 km)	50 yd (46 m)	Three trailers, two barns, and a car were destroyed, the roof was torn off a house, and trees and power lines were downed. Two people were injured.
F0	Centre	Cherokee	AL	34.15°N 85.68°W	03:35–03:37	1.3 mi (2.1 km)	75 yd (69 m)	Several roofs were damaged, and a few trees were downed.
F1	Cisco	Murray	GA	34.95°N 84.73°W	04:05	0.5 mi (0.80 km)	100 yd (91 m)	A mobile home park was struck, with seven mobile homes being destroyed, two receiving major damage, and six more having minor damage. One home had major structural damage, and 14 others had minor damage. Numerous trees were downed as well. Ten people sustained minor injuries.
F1	W of Cleveland to S of Charleston	Bradley	TN	35.17°N 85.00°W	04:20–?	11.5 mi (18.5 km)	50 yd (46 m)	1 death – Two homes were destroyed, and 33 additional homes, 10 barns, two mobile homes, and a church were damaged. The fatality occurred while the person tried to take shelter.

== See also ==
- List of North American tornadoes and tornado outbreaks
- 1998 Nashville tornado outbreak
