= 1998 Spencer tornado =

1998 F4 tornado in South Dakota

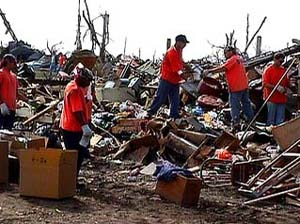
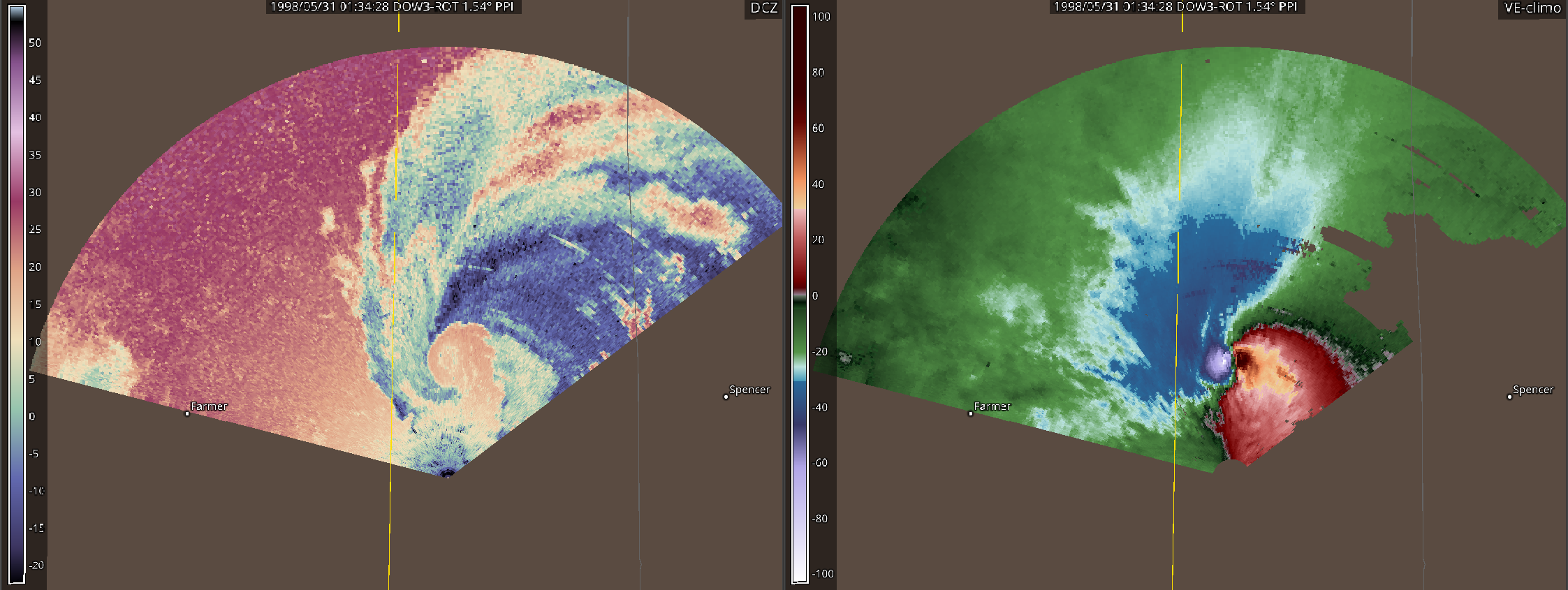
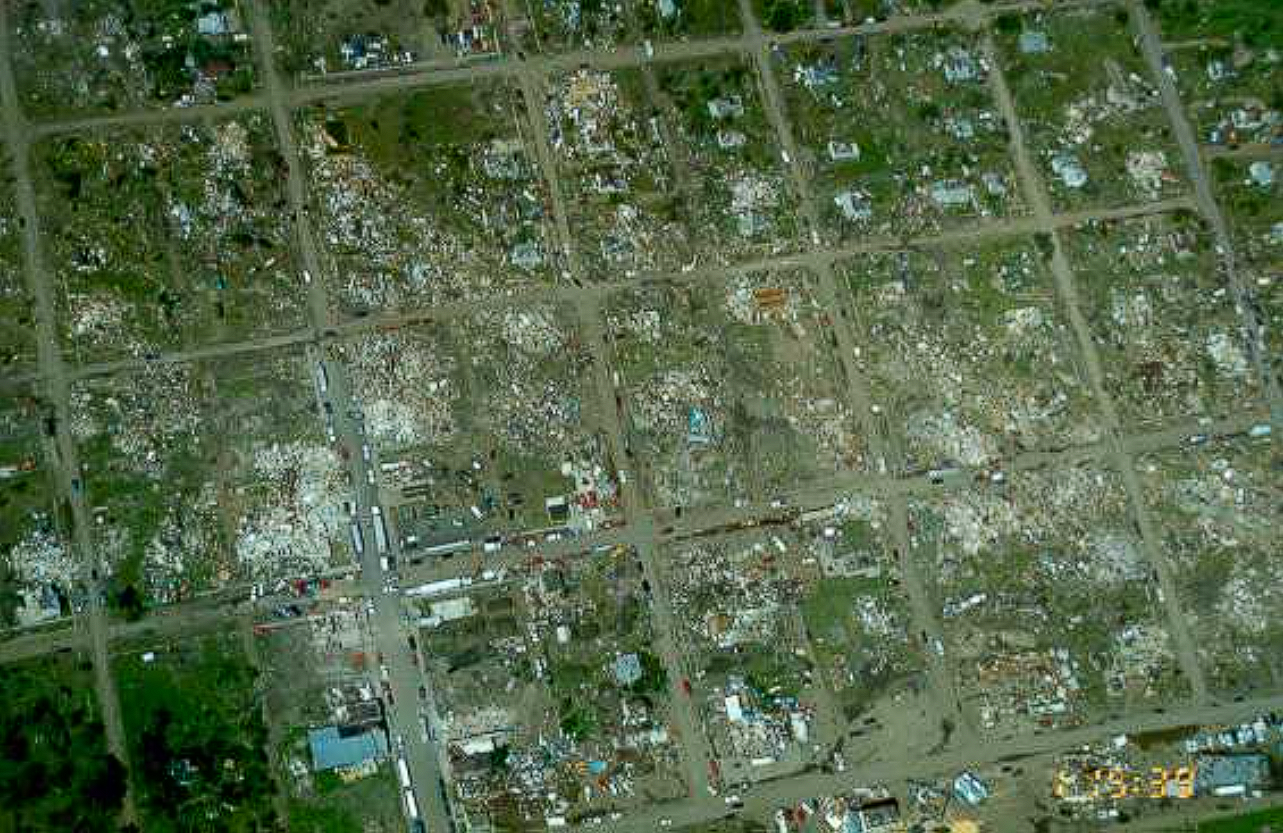
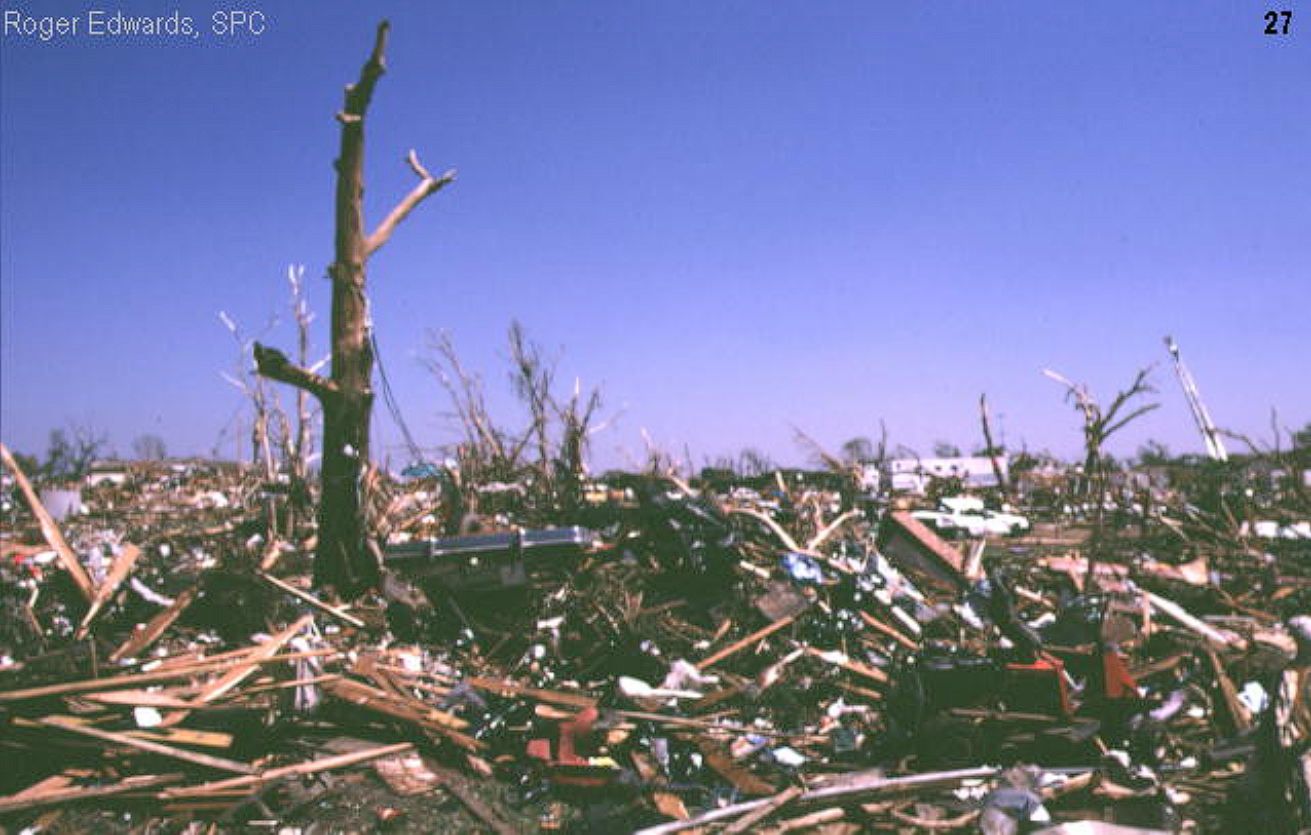
- Clockwise from top: A photo taken of the deadly and dust cloaked tornado as it was entering Spencer, a Doppler on Wheels mobile radar dataset of the tornado, panorama of F3 to F4 rated damage in Spencer, aerial view of northeastern Spencer, photo of workers cleaning up debris following the tornado in Spencer.

Meteorological history
- Formed: May 30, 1998, 8:26 p.m. CDT (UTC−05:00)
- Dissipated: May 30, 1998, 8:52 p.m. CDT (UTC−05:00)
- Duration: 26 minutes

F4 tornado
- on the Fujita scale
- Max width: 1,600 yards (0.91 mi; 1.5 km)
- Path length: 14 miles (23 km)
- Highest winds: Official intensity: 207–260 mph (333–418 km/h); Measured winds: 264 mph (425 km/h) (Instantaneous winds estimated by Doppler On Wheels (DOW) mobile radar)

Overall effects
- Fatalities: 6
- Injuries: 150
- Damage: $18.5 million (1998 USD)
- Areas affected: Hanson and McCook Counties, South Dakota, United States; particularly near Farmer and in Spencer.
- Part of the Late-May 1998 tornado outbreak and derecho and Tornadoes of 1998

On the evening of May 30, 1998, a large, destructive and extremely violent tornado tore across Hanson and McCook Counties, in the southeastern part of the state of South Dakota. It particularly devastated the small city of Spencer, and was part of the historic late-May tornado outbreak and derecho that swept across the northern United States and southern Canada. In South Dakota, the storm was the deadliest tornado to occur in state history, and was the fifth deadliest of the 1998 season.

The Spencer tornado as it is known by the press, was part of a family of tornadoes that formed under the same supercell thunderstorm. It formed after a few previous tornadoes nearby had dissipated, passing near the community of Farmer before rapidly intensifying and impacting Spencer at peak intensity. Survey results from the National Weather Service in Sioux Falls concluded that the tornado's damage was consistent with a rating of F4 on the Fujita Scale, with winds ranging from 207–260 mph (333–418 km/h). A nearby Doppler on Wheels (DOW) mobile radar truck unit, captured instantaneous wind gusts of up to 264 mph (425 km/h).

== Meteorological synopsis ==
=== Episode narrative ===
A severe weather set-up was in place for May 30. A strong jet stream was approaching South Dakota, bringing winds over 50 m/s, or 112 mph (180 km/h). Another jet stream was leaving the area simultaneously, creating a region of low pressure that sat atop the Missouri River. Warm, moist air extended from the southeast with cooler, dry air to the north. A cold front and dry line was also present. CAPE values were up to 4050 J/kg. These meteorological conditions led to strong wind shear, high moisture, cool mid-level temperatures, and a capped atmosphere, leading to a significant weather event across South Dakota, producing tornadic supercells. As a result of these, the Storm Prediction Center issued a Moderate Risk for eastern South Dakota.

=== Event narrative ===
By 6:00 p.m. CDT (23:00 UTC), several isolated thunderstorms formed along the dryline, including one located about 100 km (62.1 mi) west-northwest of Spencer. These supercells were observed by both the Sioux Falls WSR-88D radar and a Doppler on Wheels (DOW) mobile radar. Spotter reports and an NWS damage survey suggested that five different tornadoes caused the damage in Hanson and McCook Counties, including the town of Spencer. After an F2 rated tornado near Fulton had dissipated, the Spencer tornado would begin forming.

== Tornado summary ==
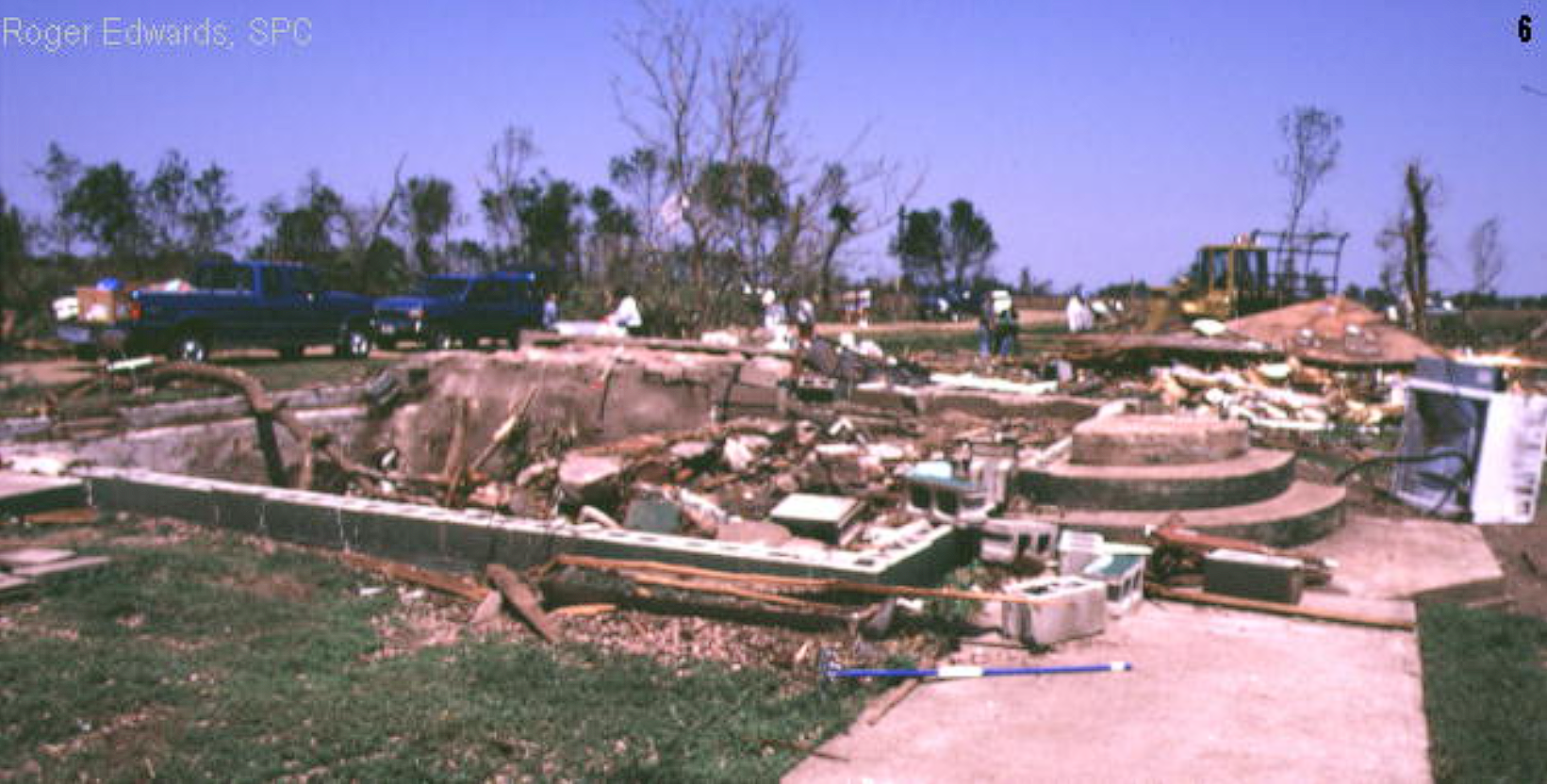
An unanchored farmhouse was swept away on 252nd Street, between Farmer and Spencer.

=== Early stages ===
At 8:26 p.m. CDT (01:26 UTC), the tornado formed over rural Hanson County, northwest of Farmer. From 8:26 p.m. to 8:37 p.m. CDT (01:37 UTC), it would move southeast over rural farmland northwest of Spencer. It blew down a fence before knocking a few trees down, and impacting a farmstead at F1-F3 intensity before crossing into McCook County, where Spencer was located. Multiple storm chasers watched the tornado as it was approaching the community, appearing as a large, dusty, "wedge" tornado. Copious amounts of dust along the western and southern sides of the tornado were being sucked up by the parent supercell's rear flank downdraft, confusing storm chasers and spotters observing the tornado from 2 mi (3.22 km) away. At 8:32 p.m. CDT (01:32 UTC), a tornado warning was issued for areas in northern McCook County, where Spencer was also included.

=== Track through Spencer ===
Radar loop of supercells forming over South Dakota on May 30. The green "Home" location is where Spencer was located.

Between 8:38 p.m. CDT (01:38 UTC) to 8:45 p.m. CDT (01:45 UTC), the tornado impacted the community, entering town from the northwest corner. Based on damage surveys after the tornado, significant damage (F2+) extended 100–150 m (328–492 ft) north of the tornado's center. To the south of the tornado, serious damage reached 200–250 m (656–820 ft) out, ranging from F0-F4 on the Fujita Scale. Six residents of the town were killed, becoming the first tornado in South Dakota to have fatalities since 1970; and also becoming the first F4 rated tornado in South Dakota since 1993. Five of the six fatalities occurred inside an apartment complex which was hit by the most violent winds. Well-constructed homes were leveled, structures with weak foundations were blown off, vehicles were thrown. Nearly all 190 homes and structures in town were leveled including the town's water tower, bank, five churches, post office, fire department, nursing home, grain bins, and other businesses. A few homes around the northeastern portion of town were spared by the tornado. A receipt was blown from Spencer and found west of Chandler, about 80 miles east of Spencer. It left a path of destruction of nearly 1 mile through town. Just before reaching I-90, the tornado dissipated around 5 mi (8.05 km) southeast of Spencer, leaving a path of approximately 14 miles (23 kilometers).

== Aftermath ==
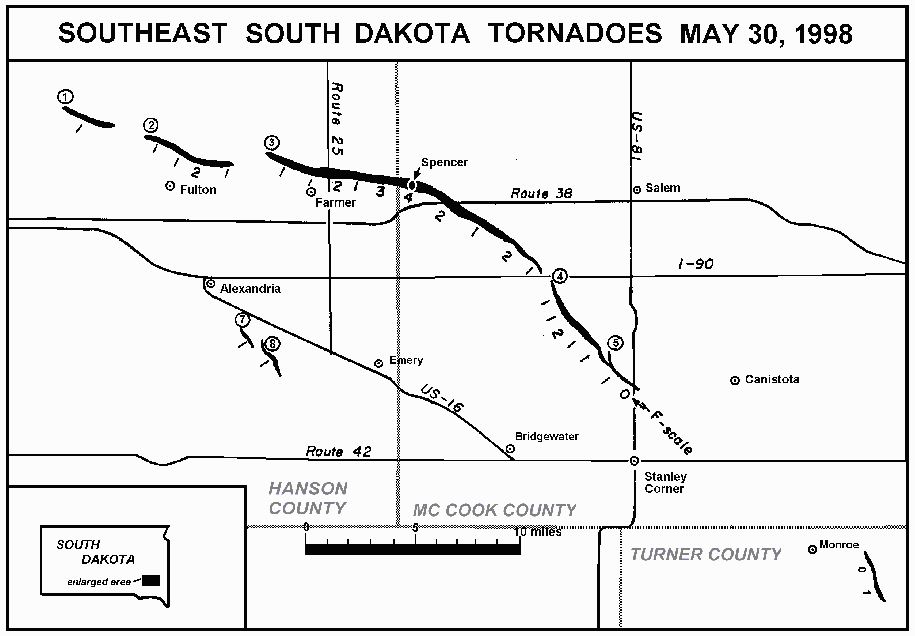
The Spencer tornado's path along with other tornadoes in South Dakota during the outbreak.

Just after 9:00 p.m. CDT (02:00 UTC), the first reports of damage in Spencer was reported at the forecast office. At 9:10 p.m. CDT (02:10 UTC), the last tornado spawned by the Spencer supercell dissipated. Details on the casualties and the amount of destruction that occurred to the town reached the forecast office after 10:00 p.m. CDT (03:00 UTC). Ground and aerial surveys of the damage began the following day on May 31, conducted by Greg Harmon − a meteorologist in charge of the NWS Forecast Office in Sioux Falls. On June 3, 1998, the NWS officially classified the tornado with a rating of F4.

The NWS also noted the length of the damage path to be around 14 miles (23 km) long, with a maximum width of ^{3}/_{8} mi (0.60 km) over town. Emergency services responded quickly to the destruction. Among these were former Federal Emergency Management Agency (FEMA) Director James Lee Witt and former FEMA Regional Director and U.S. Senate candidate Rick Weiland. Witt − who guided the agency through 348 disasters − said that the Spencer tornado was one of the higher end of his list of worst disasters during his time in office. Weiland along with Bill Janklow coordinated to help survivors receive food, shelter, and necessities. FEMA also worked with state and local governments and voluntary organizations, such as the American Red Cross, to provide relief assistance to the victims.

After the tornado, the population of Spencer, South Dakota decreased from 315 citizens to only 145. The Spencer tornado was also one of the first tornadoes fully documented by Doppler On Wheels (DOW). It has since been overshadowed by other tornadoes with higher wind speeds that were recorded by DOW − such as the 1999 Bridge Creek-Moore, 2013 El Reno, and 2024 Greenfield tornadoes. The tornado claimed a total of six, injured 150, hospitalized 41 others. 156 property owners were undecided about rebuilding, 62 properties would be rebuilt, 16 property owners stayed at Spencer but at a different location. 12 owners wanted to lease or sell excess property. The tornado caused a total of $18.5 million in damages, making it the costliest in South Dakota's history.

== Mobile radar measurements ==
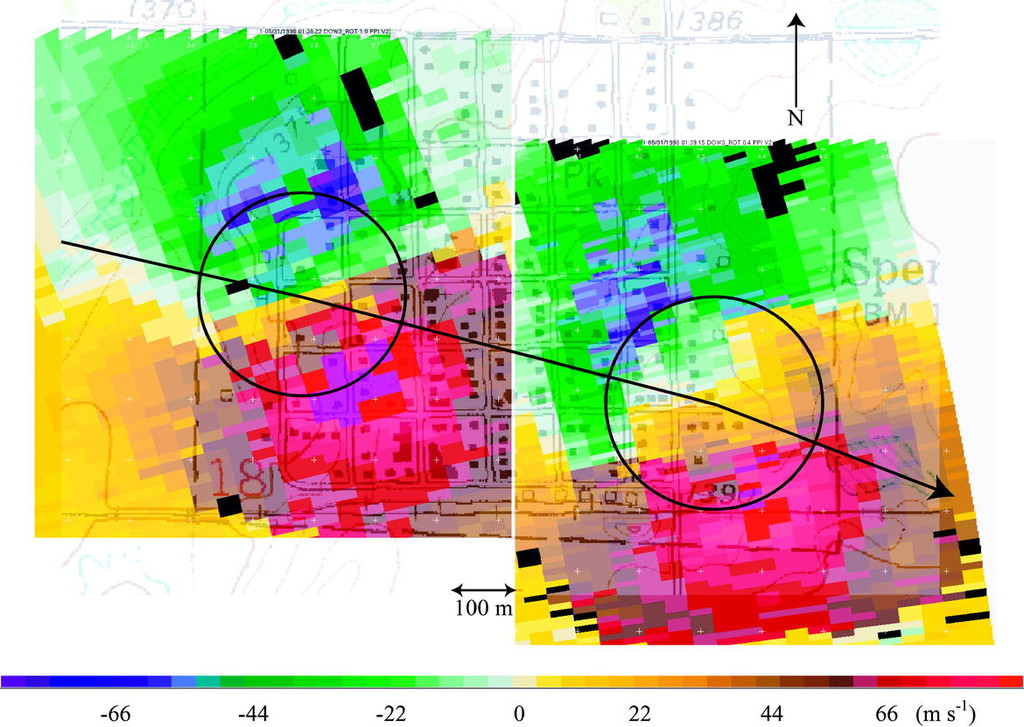
Doppler On Wheels (DOW) field data of the tornado over Spencer. DOW recorded gusts in excess of 93 m/s, or 208 mph (335 km/h) in the magenta gates between 8:38:29 p.m. CDT (01:38:29 UTC), to 8:39:18 p.m. CDT (01:39:18 UTC).

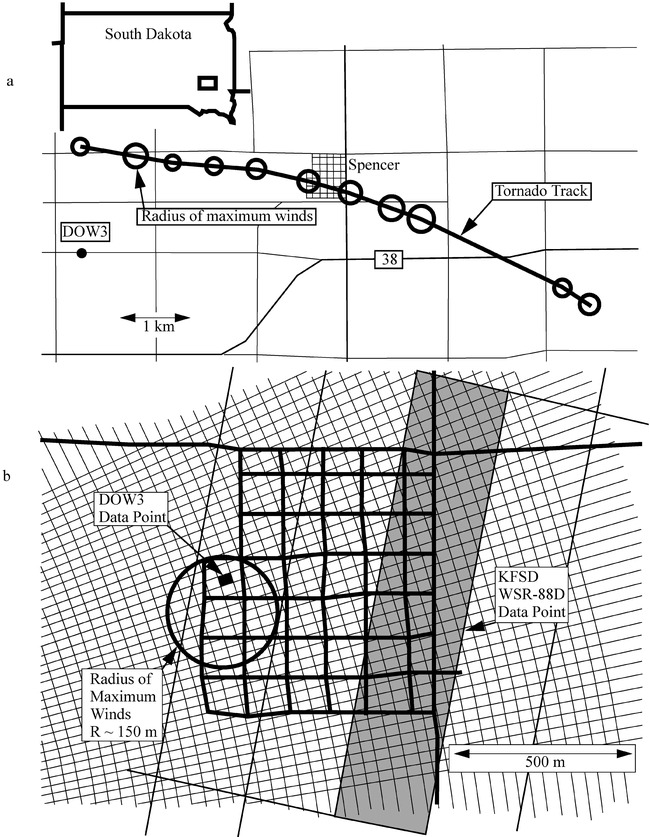
Geometry of the DOW radar deployment showing geographic locations of (a) the tornado core-flow region. (b) shows the polar grid of radar data samples from both DOW and the KFSD radars over the street map of Spencer.

Throughout the entire tornado's life, a Doppler on Wheels (DOW) mobile radar truck was observing the tornado as it moved through parts of southeastern South Dakota, which was positioned 4 km (2.49 mi) west of Spencer. The DOW truck was close enough to the tornado to measure winds above ground level (20-40 m AGL).

While the tornado was over town, 5-second average winds of over 100 m/s, or roughly 225 mph (362 km/h) were recorded, putting it around the F4 range of wind speeds in the original Fujita Scale, and higher than the EF5 threshold for the Enhanced Fujita Scale. These wind speeds were located at the south side of the tornado's core, matching the intense damage seen after the tornado. F1 range of wind speeds lasted for around 120 seconds south of town, with F2, F3, and F4 winds lasting shorter and were concentrated in a narrower path, just south of the tornado's center, with F4 winds lasting 22 seconds around 50 m (164 ft) away south where F4 damage was reported. The radar truck also recorded winds of up to 264 mph (425 km/h) below 50 m (164 ft) above the ground level around a small area, above the threshold for F5 winds in the Fujita Scale, also capturing a peak of 250 mph (402 km/h) on the west side of town.

== See also ==
- List of F4, EF4, and IF4 tornadoes
- Tornado records
  - Highest winds observed in a tornado
- Mobile radar observation of tornadoes
  - List of notable observations
- 2003 Manchester tornado − A similar, destructive F4 tornado in South Dakota that wiped out a town.
- 2025 Enderlin tornado − A violent EF5 tornado in North Dakota that also occurred alongside a derecho.
- 2024 Greenfield tornado − An exceptionally violent and destructive EF4 tornado in Iowa, which was recorded with mobile radar.
- 1999 Bridge Creek-Moore tornado − An extremely violent F5 tornado that occurred nearly a year later in Oklahoma, which also saw mobile radar observations.
