= Tornado outbreak and derecho of May 30–31, 1998 =

Weather event

Late-May 1998 tornado outbreak and derecho
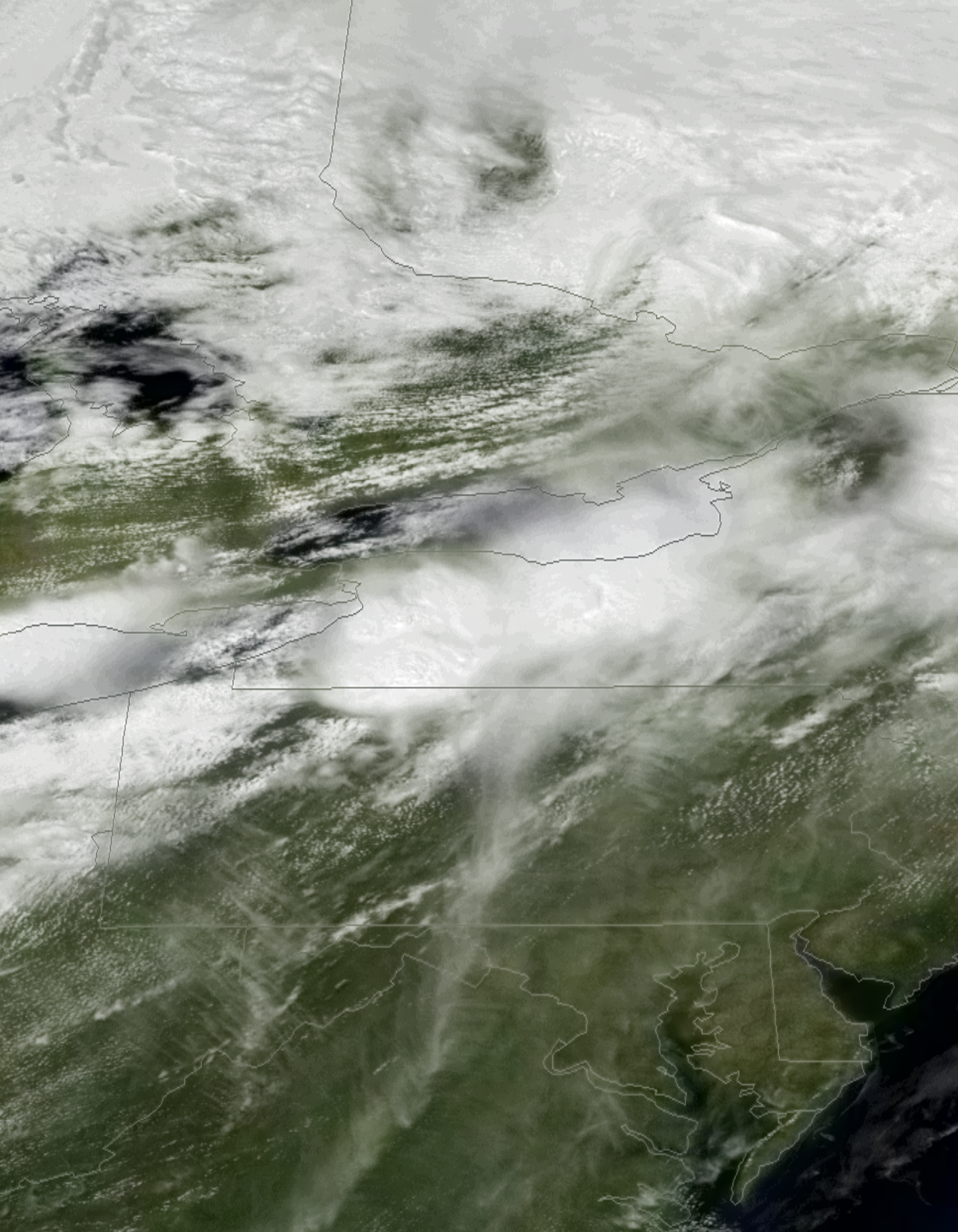
- Satellite imagery of the derecho inland Upstate New York on May 31

Meteorological history
- Formed: May 30, 1998
- Dissipated: May 31, 1998
- Duration: 2 days

Tornado outbreak
- Tornadoes: 60
- Max. rating: F4 tornado
- Highest winds: 220 mph (350 km/h); Spencer, SD tornado

Overall effects
- Fatalities: 7 deaths (+6 non-tornadic), 233+ tornadic injuries
- Areas affected: Great Plains, Midwest, Ontario, Northeastern United States
- Power outages: Over 2 million
- Part of the tornado outbreaks of 1998

The Late-May 1998 tornado outbreak and derecho was a historic tornado outbreak and derecho that began on the afternoon of May 30 and extended throughout May 31, 1998, across a large portion of the northern half of the United States and southern Ontario from southeastern Montana east and southeastward to the Atlantic Ocean. The initial tornado outbreak, including the devastating Spencer tornado, hit southeast South Dakota on the evening of May 30. The Spencer tornado was the most destructive and the second-deadliest tornado in South Dakota history. A total of 13 people were killed; 7 by tornadoes and 6 by the derecho. Over two million people lost electrical power, some for up to 10 days.

The derecho was the most violent line of thunderstorms observed on earth during the 1998 calendar year according to the National Weather Service review shortly after the year was over. It was the climax of an unusually heavy derecho season in the North-Central United States and adjacent parts of Canada and the Northeast United States, and this storm combined the characteristics of the two major forms of derecho, the serial and progressive derecho, known as a hybrid derecho. At various points of its evolution, it displayed textbook or record manifestations of supercell and derecho-related phenomena such as the right-mover supercell, evolution of supercells into a linear meso-scale feature which rapidly became a derecho, cumulonimbus with overshooting top and dome, bow echo, bookend vortices, regular and rotor downbursts, gust front, gustnado, rear inflow notch, classic derecho radar signature, effects of infrasound and atmospheric electricity, haboobs, and wind effects on bodies of water including seiches and exposure of bottoms of water features by the wind. The disturbance which was originally the derecho finally disappeared off the coast of Norway more than a week later.

== May 30 South Dakota event ==
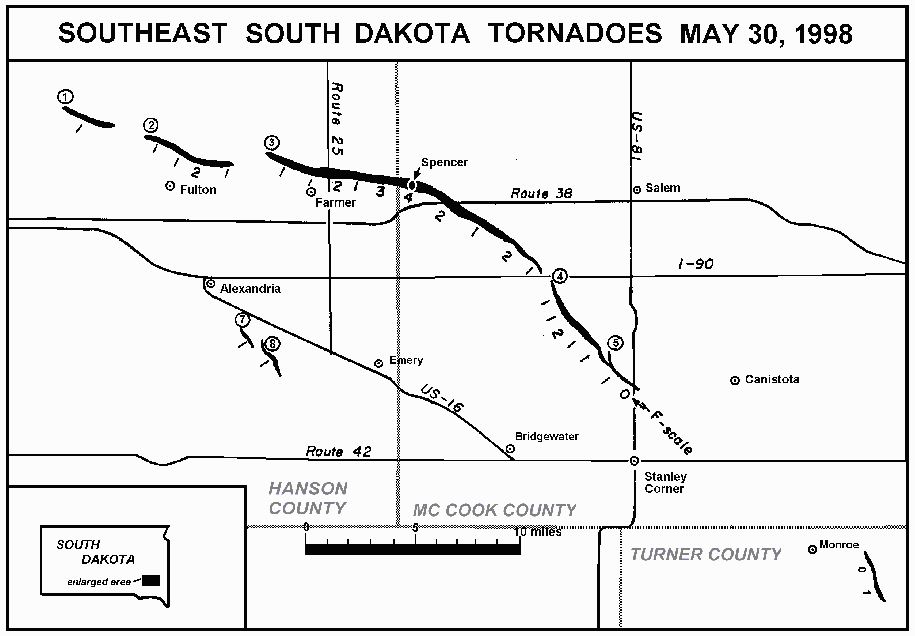
NWS damage survey map tracking the tornado families in southeast South Dakota

The first severe weather of the outbreak was reported at 12:30 p.m. in southeast Montana. Several hours later a supercell thunderstorm produced 2.75-inch (7.0 cm) hail across southeast Montana, kicking off the outbreak in earnest. Numerous reports of very large hail were received throughout the outbreak with the largest official report of 3.00 inches (7.6 cm) 10 miles (16 km) north of St. Lawrence in east-central South Dakota. The hail itself produced thousands of dollars in damage. Many reports of severe straight-line winds and damage were also reported. Numerous storm chaser reports suggest that significant severe weather events also occurred in the sparsely populated area traversed by the storm.

Later that evening, a supercell in southeastern South Dakota produced a series of tornadoes. The family of tornadoes that crossed the Spencer area was observed by a Doppler on Wheels (DOW) radar (Wurman et al. 1997, Wurman 2001). The DOW observed the tornadoes from before 8:04 through 8:45 pm local time (01:04–01:45 UTC)(Alexander and Wurman 2005) and the passage of a destructive F4 tornado through Spencer itself from 8:37-8:38 (01:37-01:38 UTC). DOW measurements of tornadic winds over the largely destroyed southern portion of Spencer permitted the first direct comparison of measured winds with F (or EF) Scale damage ratings as reported in the above referenced articles. Peak observed Doppler winds of near 115 m/s (260 mph) corresponded well with the documented F4 damage.

The DOW observations showed that the list of tornadoes derived from damage surveys alone, and the F-scale rating of that damage, may be incomplete and underestimate actual tornado intensity (Wurman and Alexander 2005). Single tornadoes may be mis-characterized as multiple tornadoes due to breaks in the observed damage. DOW measurements suggest that the F4 tornado may have had a multiple-vortex structure as it struck Spencer.

Storm chasers William T. Reid, Martin Lisius, Keith Brown, and Cheryl Chang forecasted and intercepted the large and destructive Spencer, South Dakota tornado moments before it entered the town. The chase team was positioned east of town and first observed the tornado at approximately 8:35 pm and captured numerous photographs, video, and 35mm motion picture film of the event as it unfolded.

== Confirmed tornadoes ==
Confirmed tornadoes by Fujita rating
FU	F0	F1	F2	F3	F4	F5	Total
0	7	8	3	0	1	0	18

=== May 30 event (South Dakota) ===
F no.	Location	County	Time (UTC)	Path length	Damage
South Dakota
F0	W of Lake Preston	Kingsbury	0002	unknown	First tornado touchdown. Short-lived with no damage.
F1	NW of Fulton	Hanson	0008	2 miles (3.2 km)	This was a fairly large and dusty tornado that affected mostly open ground in rural areas. It was the first tornado of the tornado family generated by the supercell that produced the Spencer tornado.
F2	NE of Fulton	Hanson	0016	6 miles (9.6 km)	Large tornado that produced minor damage, mostly remaining in open fields and trees. This was the second tornado of the Spencer tornado family.
F4	Spencer area	Hanson, McCook	0026	14 miles (23 km)	6 deaths – See article on this tornado
F1	SE of Alexandria	Hanson	0055	2 miles (3.2 km)	Tornado not related to the Spencer tornado family; it formed on a rear flank downdraft (RFD) of the Spencer supercell and tracked roughly to the south of that storm. Multiple major tornadoes from these two supercells were often ongoing and visible simultaneously. This tornado resulted in moderate damage to crops and several buildings.
F2	S of Salem	McCook	0056	6 miles (9.6 km)	Large tornado that resulted in significant damage to numerous farm buildings and houses, as well as extensive power line and crop damage. This too was a very large and strong tornado incurring about $1.0 million in damages to farm property, power lines, and crops. Tornado was 700 yards (640 m) wide.
F1	W of Emery	Hanson	0101	2 miles (3.2 km)	Related to the Alexandria tornado. Minor damage was reported.
F1	W of Canistota	Hanson	0107	1 miles (1.6 km)	Final tornado from the Spencer tornado family. Significant damage occurred at one farm.
F0	E of Emery	Hanson	0110	unknown	Brief tornado.
F1	E of Monroe	Turner	0125	1 mile (1.6 km)	Moderate property damage was reported.
Sources: NCDC

=== May 30 event (Derecho) ===
F no.	Location	County	Time (UTC)	Path length	Damage
Wisconsin
F2	E of Menomonie	Dunn	0428	1 mile (1.6 km)	Three houses, including a mobile home, were destroyed. Heavy damage also reported on several farms. 8 people were injured.
F0	SW of Mosinee	Marathon	0621	200 yd (180 m)	Brief tornado embedded in the damage from the derecho.
F1	N of Stockbridge	Calumet	0720	1 mile (1.6 km)	Considerable damage reported in the area. Two barns were destroyed, along with a garage and silo. Damage also reported to one house.
Michigan
F0	SE of Lake City	Missaukee	0930	500 yd (450 m)	Numerous trees were snapped.
F0	Torch Lake	Antrim	0935	unknown	Brief tornado touchdown with minimal damage.
F1	N of Kalkaska	Kalkaska	0950	7 miles (11 km)	One mobile home was destroyed and two others were damaged. Extensive tree damage reported.
F0	N of Grayling	Crawford	0955	unknown	Brief tornado touchdown. One house sustained heavy damage.
F0	W of Flushing	Genesee	1025	unknown	Tornado confirmed amidst heavy derecho damage. Minor tornado-related tree and building damage.
Sources: NCDC

=== Spencer, South Dakota ===
Spencer, South Dakota
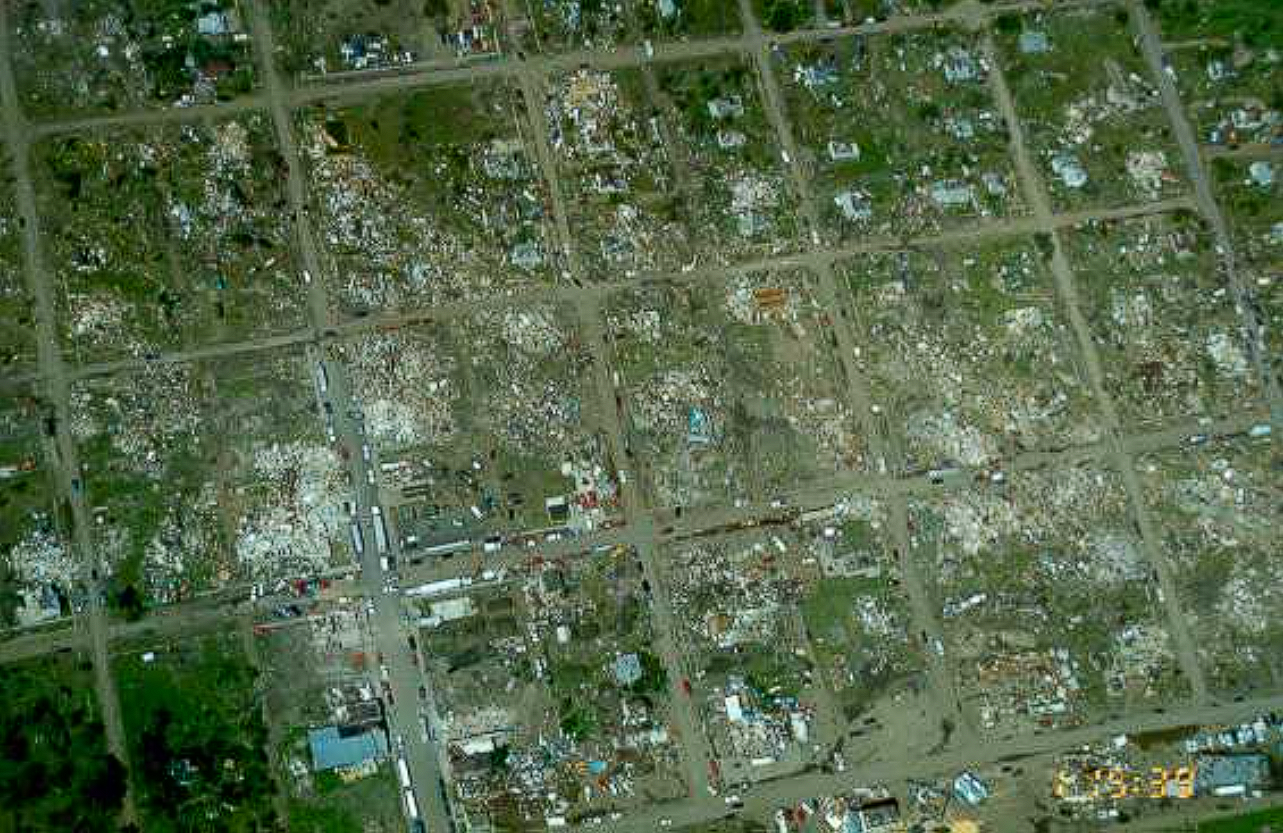
- Aerial view of northeastern Spencer.

Meteorological history
- Formed: May 30, 1998, 8:26 p.m. CDT (UTC−05:00)
- Dissipated: May 30, 1998, 8:52 p.m. CDT (UTC−05:00)
- Duration: 26 minutes

F4 tornado
- on the Fujita scale
- Highest winds: Official intensity: 207–260 mph (333–418 km/h); Radar estimated: 264 mph (425 km/h) (Measurement by Doppler On Wheels (DOW) mobile radar)

Overall effects
- Fatalities: 6
- Injuries: 150
- Damage: $18.5 million (1998 USD)

This violent tornado became the most destructive and deadliest tornado in South Dakota state history. It was also the fifth deadliest tornado of the year. It began as a large, dust-cloaked tornado northwest of Farmer in Hanson County, concurrent with the demise of the earlier "Fulton" F2 tornado produced by the supercell thunderstorm. Continuing toward the east-southeast, it struck several farmsteads before crossing the Hanson/McCook County line a half mile west-northwest of Spencer. At this time, the tornado was being observed by the University of Oklahoma Doppler on Wheels crew, whose mobile Doppler weather radar data showed up to 220 mph (350 km/h) winds in the tornado only a few decameters above the ground, while another source showed winds of 264 mph (425 km/h) within the lowest 50 m (160 ft) above radar level, which suggest winds of both F5 and EF5 intensity though the maximum damage intensity observed in the town of Spencer was F4.

This tornado carved a 1,600 yd (0.91 mi; 1.5 km) wide path before impacting the town of Spencer between 8:38 p.m. CDT (01:38 UTC) and 8:45 p.m. CDT (01:45 UTC), destroying or damaging all but a few houses on the northeastern side of town, and blowing over the water tower. Several homes in town were swept from their foundations by the tornado. The tornado killed six people, injured 150 (which is more than one-third of the town residents), and destroyed most of the town's 190 buildings. Many trees and power lines were downed, and vehicles were destroyed as well. 5 of the 6 fatalities occurred in an apartment building that collapsed. Damage was estimated at $18.5 million. The population of the town diminished soon after to less than half of what it was previous to the tornado, from 315 to 145 in April 1999.

== May 30–31 Southern Great Lakes derecho ==
This derecho got its start from a developing low pressure system that moved into the northern Great Plains and Great Lakes. The derecho formed from the same storm system that spawned the Spencer, South Dakota Tornado, which killed six people. The supercell thunderstorm which produced that tornado transitioned into the derecho which killed another six people. It would become the most destructive natural disaster to hit the Upper Midwest in recent memory.

=== Minnesota ===
The most damage in Minnesota occurred at the northern edge in Sibley and McLeod Counties. Winds ranged from 80–100 mph (130–160 km/h) in those two counties.

After the derecho raced through Minnesota, tens of thousands of trees were blown down. There were 500,000 customers without power. Over 100 homes were destroyed or damaged beyond repair. Twenty-two people were injured. The derecho caused $50 million in damage in southern Minnesota and northern Wisconsin.

=== Wisconsin ===
The derecho raced across Wisconsin in only three hours killing one person in Washington County when a tree fell through the roof and onto her bed where she was sleeping. It injured 37 people in Wisconsin. Many utility companies and emergency customers said that this was the most damaging straight-line wind thunderstorm event in 100 years. Five thousand homes and businesses were damaged and 24 were destroyed.

An area of south-central, south-east, and east-central Wisconsin reported wind gusts of over 100 mph (160 km/h) from this thunderstorm complex with an all-time official state record gust of 128 mph (206 km/h) 3 miles (4.8 km) north-east of Watertown in Dodge County. As with other derechos like the July 4, 1977 blow-down in northern Wisconsin, there were other unofficial reports of higher winds as well as estimates of such, including winds of 102 mph (164 km/h) sustained for a number of minutes and gusts up to 140 mph (230 km/h) also in Dodge County and/or adjacent sections of Fond du Lac County.

The roar of the wind from the derecho was audible up to 30 miles (48 km) away as the storm traversed this region. Road signs and other metal structures were found thrown about and even violently twisted in the area of 100 mph-plus wind from north-east Dane County through Dodge and Fond du Lac and Washington counties—evidence of both straight-line winds and rotor downbursts were widespread in this area as well as many other points along the path of the storm, and the sound of wind and perhaps hail and the effects of infrasound from some parts of the storm complex was also reported. In the latter case, some people reported strange feelings of pressure, and dogs, cats, and raccoons went wild.

The derecho also caused boating accidents by generating a seiche on Lake Michigan which was reported to be around 10 feet (3.0 metres) high as it first struck the Michigan coastline of Lake Michigan further north in Muskegon County.

=== Central Great Lakes ===
The storm raced through Michigan in only two hours at an average speed of 70 mph (110 km/h). Four people were killed in Michigan, and 146 were injured. Total damage was estimated at $172 million (1998 dollars). 250 homes and 34 businesses were destroyed. In Grand Haven the Story & Clark smokestack at the Piano Factory Condominiums was destroyed when the force of the high wind caused it to crumble, and trees collapsed all over the city, some falling onto roofs. Damage in Spring Lake was worse, due to a highly localized zone of higher winds. The Mill Pointe Condominiums suffered serious damage, including the collapse of one unit. Others were subsequently removed. A factory lost its roof in the storm, and a number of businesses were damaged severely, one beyond repair. Country Estates Mobile Home park also suffered serious damage. Extensive damage to Grandville (approximately 30 miles (48 km) inland) led to the city being closed off, with no traffic allowed to enter in the day after the derecho's passage. A woman was killed in Pinconning, about 130 miles (210 km) north of Detroit, when a tree fell on her house.

This derecho would go on to break the record for biggest power outage ever in the state of Michigan (but later surpassed by the 2003 North America blackout). 860,000 people lost power, slightly more than the number from the Southern Great Lakes Derecho of 1991. It blew down five 345-kilovolt transmission towers owned by Consumers Energy.

A total of 13 counties in Central Lower Michigan were declared federal disaster areas.

One person drowned in Ontario when his boat turned over from the derecho's strong winds. Buildings in Toronto lost numerous windows and significant damage was observed in areas such as Trenton, Napanee, Picton and Kingston. Heavy thunderstorm activity was also reported in Ottawa and Montreal, but without damage.

It caused $300,000 worth of damage in central New York before reforming into a tornado outbreak at around 11 am on May 31.

=== Summary ===
Overall, the derecho traveled 975 miles (1,569 km) from southern Minnesota to central New York in 15 hours at an average speed of 65 mph (105 km/h). It became one of the most damaging derecho events in North America's history, causing $300 million (1998 USD) in damage.

== May 31 New York and Pennsylvania tornadoes ==
On Sunday, May 31, Friday's cold front, which stalled over southern Pennsylvania, started moving quickly back northward as a warm front as strong low pressure approached the Great Lakes. North of the warm front, most of the Hudson Valley and Western New England were under a cool and stable marine air mass, as a result of southeast winds from the Atlantic Ocean. Around 8 am, the warm front was located roughly over the Mohawk River to central and northern Massachusetts, producing powerful thunderstorms. After the warm front's passage, sunshine broke out and strong heating commenced across the Northeast with temperatures quickly rising from the 50s through the 70s into the 80s, and dewpoints skyrocketing from the lower 40s into the upper 60s. Surface winds began blowing from the southeast at around 30 mph, while the winds at mid-levels were from the southwest at 60 to 80 mph, and the winds at jetstream level were still ranging from 120 to 150 mph from the west. High levels of instability were present as well. This created an unusually highly sheared environment in the Northeast.

The Storm Prediction Center issued a High Risk for severe thunderstorms across northern Pennsylvania, northern New Jersey, eastern and central New York, western Massachusetts, western Connecticut, and western Vermont. A High Risk had never before been issued for the Northeastern United States, and hasn't been since this event. This indicated an abnormally dangerous weather situation for this region of the country, a situation more common in the Plains States, Midwest and Deep South.

Around 1 pm, the Michigan derecho was moving into New York from Ontario and rapidly weakening. The decaying squall line broke apart into discrete convection over New York and Pennsylvania, which quickly re-intensified into tornadic supercells.

The most destructive tornado of the day was an F3 that tore through Mechanicville and the adjacent town of Stillwater. It caused major damage to Mechanicville's old industrial section located on Route 4 and 32 along the Hudson River. One of the two historic smokestacks (visible from 2 miles away) was knocked down by the tornado. In 2005, the other smokestack and the conjoined building were bulldozed. The tornado was rated F3 (winds estimated at 200 MPH at the time) on the Fujita scale, and was 970 yards (890 m) wide. In total, 70 homes and businesses were completely demolished, and hundreds more damaged. Extensive deforestation occurred along the path as well. 68 people were injured, but no loss of life occurred. Pink insulation was reported falling from the sky ahead of the tornado, in Valley Falls, New York, 12 miles east of Mechanicville. Film negatives from Mechanicville were reportedly found there as well.

Numerous other strong tornadoes touched down across upstate New York and Pennsylvania that evening, several of which reached F2 to F3 intensity. One F3 caused major damage in the city of Binghamton. The other F3 caused major damage in the village of Windsor. This outbreak was likely the most intense, widespread, and long duration severe weather event in modern New York state history. Other less intense tornadoes touched down in surrounding states.

== Confirmed tornadoes ==
Confirmed tornadoes by Fujita rating
FU	F0	F1	F2	F3	F4	F5	Total
0	13	13	10	6	0	0	42

=== May 31 event ===
List of confirmed tornadoes
F#	Location	County	Time (CDT)	Path length	Damage
Indiana
F0	Spencerville area	DeKalb	1244	0.1 miles (0.16 km)	Brief tornado reported by law enforcement.
F0	Auburn area	DeKalb	1315	0.1 miles (0.16 km)	Brief touchdown with no damage.
Ohio
F0	Continental area	Putnam	1404	0.1 miles (0.16 km)	Brief touchdown with no damage.
F1	SE of Hickoryville	Clinton	1825	0.3 miles (0.5 km)	Damage was limited to trees
Ontario
F0	SE of Trenton	Prince Edward	1445	unknown	
New York
F3	W of Round Lake, New York to E of North Bennington, Vermont	Saratoga, Rensselaer (New York), Bennington (Vermont)	1522	31 miles (48.8 km)	This tornado had a total path length of 31 miles (50 km), crossing through 3 counties and 2 states (NY and VT). Worst damage occurred in Mechanicville and Stillwater. 350 homes and businesses damaged or destroyed along its entire track, with 68 injuries and about $70M. Large swaths of forest were leveled, and light debris from Mechanicville was found 12 miles away. Vehicles were flipped and a smokestack was blown over as well. In Vermont, extensive F2 damage occurred to homes and damage was estimated at $630,000. Tornado was 970 yards wide at times.
F1	SW of Colonie	Albany	1537	3.5 miles (5.6 km)	This was a small tornado that crossed the Albany International Airport and the New York State Thruway. It was 75 yards wide and produced $25,000 in damage. Many trees were uprooted.
F0	Davenport area	Delaware	1545	3 miles (4.8 km)	Small tornado which produced $150,000 in damage. Path width was 75 yards.
F1	Brocton area	Chautauqua	1605	2 miles (3.2 km)	Small tornado caused 2 injuries and $90,000 in damage. A house, a garage, and a barn sustained considerable damage. Other structures sustained minor damage to roofs and siding. Path width was 25 yards.
F3	Apalachin to Downsville	Tioga, Broome, Delaware	1630	62 miles (99.2 km)	This was a long-track tornado, and the longest-tracked tornado of the entire event. In Tioga County, the tornado skipped along hilltops, causing F0 to F1 tree damage near Apalachin. In neighboring Broome County, the tornado moved through the city of Binghamton at F2 intensity, damaging several structures and downing numerous trees. A TV station studio building sustained major structural damage in Binghamton. An SUV and a metal dumpster in the parking lot were tossed, and a VHS tape from the studio was found more than a mile away. A 1000-foot TV tower was downed as well. The tornado maintained its strength as it continued into Conklin, destroying mobile homes, snapping trees, and badly damaging permanent homes. Outside of Conklin, the tornado weakened to F0 strength and only caused minor damage in the Windsor area. The tornado re-intensified to F2 strength as it struck Sanford, destroying a mobile home and a metal power substation. The tornado reached maximum intensity in Delaware County and struck Deposit as an F3. A house there was left with only an interior closet standing. The tornado weakened, damaging several other homes east of Deposit before dissipating. Caused at least $2 million in damage. Several people were injured.
F2	S of Plymouth	Chenango	1650	1 miles (1.6 km)	This tornado was short lived, but had a massive width of over 1500 yards. Many trees were downed, and trailers and mobile homes were destroyed. Several cabins and a house were damaged. Small boats and sheds were tossed into a lake as well. The tornado caused $500,000 in damage.
F0	E of North Norwich	Chenango	1700	0.5 miles (0.8 km)	Trees were uprooted and a barn had metal roofing torn off. A billboard was blown over, and a house sustained damage to its roof and siding. Caused $135,000 in damage. Width was 75 yards.
F2	N of Portlandville	Otsego	1725	1 miles (1.6 km)	A large swath of trees was leveled, and structures sustained minor damage.
F3	Silver Lake to Milford	Otsego	1730	5 miles (8 km)	Multiple-vortex tornado. At the beginning of the path, trees and mobile homes were damaged in New Lisbon and Morris. The tornado intensified as it passed near Laurens, where large swaths of dense forest were leveled, with some trees denuded. Farms sustained extensive damage, and livestock was killed as well. One house was shifted off of its foundation. A refrigerator from a destroyed trailer near the end of the path was thrown 100 yards into a pond. Three people were injured, and $800,000 worth of damage occurred. The path was 800 yards wide.
F2	S of East Schodack	Rensselaer	1822	8 miles (12.8 km)	Many trees were downed and trailers were flipped. Three barns were destroyed and a few homes were damaged as well.
Pennsylvania
F1	E of Buttonwood	Lycoming	1620	0.5 miles (0.8 km)	A shed was destroyed and the roof of a lumberyard building was blown off. A wooden plank was found pierced through the tire of a semi truck, and a portable toilet was thrown into a ravine.
F0	E of Hughestown	Luzerne	1800	0.2 miles (0.32 km)	Caused damage to trees and utility poles.
F1	S of Johnsonburg	Elk	1830	3 miles (4.8 km)	Caused damage to trees and farms. Roofing was torn from a silo and a barn, and a shed was destroyed.
F0	NW of Ridgway	Elk	1830	0.5 miles (0.8 km)	Damage was limited to trees.
F2	SW of Blooming Grove	Pike	1908	2 miles (3.2 km)	Some homes at a campsite sustained minor to moderate damage, mostly from falling trees. Extensive tree damage was observed at Promise Land State Park, where large swaths of forest were leveled.
F1	S of Jericho	Cameron, Clinton	1910	5 miles (8 km)	Damage was limited to trees.
F3	N of Pecks Pond to Dingmans Ferry	Pike	1920	20 miles (32 km)	A summer home was leveled, with only one wall left standing. A mobile home was destroyed and large swaths of forest were leveled. The path was 200 yards wide.
F2	N of Blooming Grove	Pike	1920	3 miles (4.8 km)	Hundreds of trees were downed.
F0	W of Wimmers	Lackawanna	1920	0.3 miles (0.5 km)	Damage was limited to trees.
F1	Old Forge	Lackawanna	1920	0.1 miles (0.16 km)	Windows at a restaurant were blown out and a fire station sustained minor damage. Trees were downed, and a dugout at a baseball field was destroyed.
F1	NE of Salladasburg	Lycoming	1945	7 miles (11.2 km)	A haywagon, several sheds, and numerous trees were damaged. A garage and breezeway were destroyed.
F3	Salisbury area	Somerset	1950	13 miles (20.8 km)	1 death – Fatality occurred when a church steeple crushed a car. 10 to 15 businesses were heavily damaged and a house was completely destroyed. Livestock was killed and other homes were severely damaged as well. A factory building was partially destroyed and tractor-trailers were flipped. A church was also damaged and headstones were knocked over in a cemetery. Many trees were downed along the path. The path was 880 yards wide.
F0	W of Jericho	Wayne	1950	0.5 miles (0.8 km)	Caused damage to trees and power lines.
F3	Lyons area	Berks	2000	8.3 miles (13.3 km)	40 homes were damaged or destroyed in Lyons, mostly in the northern part of town. One house completely collapsed. Many trees were downed as well. The path was 120 yards wide.
F0	Montoursville area	Lycoming	2002	0.5 miles (0.8 km)	One hangar was damaged heavily and three others sustained minor damage, while some planes at the Lycoming County Airport were tossed around.
F0	S of Hughesville	Lycoming	2015	0.2 miles (0.32 km)	A trailer was destroyed while a second was blown off of its foundation.
F1	N of Beaumont	Wyoming	2015	0.5 miles (0.8 km)	Many trees were downed. One house sustained minor damage from a falling tree.
F0	W of Greentown	Pike	2050	0.3 miles (0.5 km)	Brief tornado with no damage.
F2	NE of Quarryville	Lancaster	2330	7 miles (11.2 km)	One barn was destroyed while six homes and several barns were damaged. One house had its second story ripped off. Many trees were downed, some of which landed on structures.
F1	NE of Daleville	Chester	2343	6 miles (9.6 km)	
F1	S of Pocopson	Chester	2352	3 miles (4.8 km)	5 homes were heavily damaged and 43 others less severely damaged. One mobile home was destroyed.
F2	Trevose	Bucks	0020	5.6 miles (9 km)	35 commercial building were damaged.
F2	Willow Grove to Philadelphia	Montgomery, Philadelphia	unknown	unknown	Tornado struck the north side of Philadelphia. A total of 20 structures were damaged or destroyed. Homes had their roofs blown off and cars had their windows blown out. Four people were injured.
New Hampshire
F2	S of Antrim	Hillsborough	1703	0.5 miles (0.8 km)	A wall from an elementary school was damaged while a boat and trailer were flipped over.
Connecticut
F1	SW of Washington	Litchfield	2030	0.3 miles (0.5 km)	Damage was limited to trees.
Kentucky
F2	E of Pellyton	Adair	2035	1 miles (1.6 km)	A brick home was heavily damaged while several mobile homes were destroyed.
F1	N of Fonde	Bell	2148	1.5 miles (2.4 km)	Two mobile homes were destroyed, while 12 homes and 2 churches were damaged.
Sources: NCDC, Tornado History Project - May 31, 1998 Storm Data 1998 Ontario Tornadoes

== See also ==
- List of derecho events
- June 2012 North American derecho
- Derecho and tornado outbreak of April 4–5, 2011
