= Tornado outbreak of April 15–16, 1998 =

Mid-season tornado outbreak in the United States

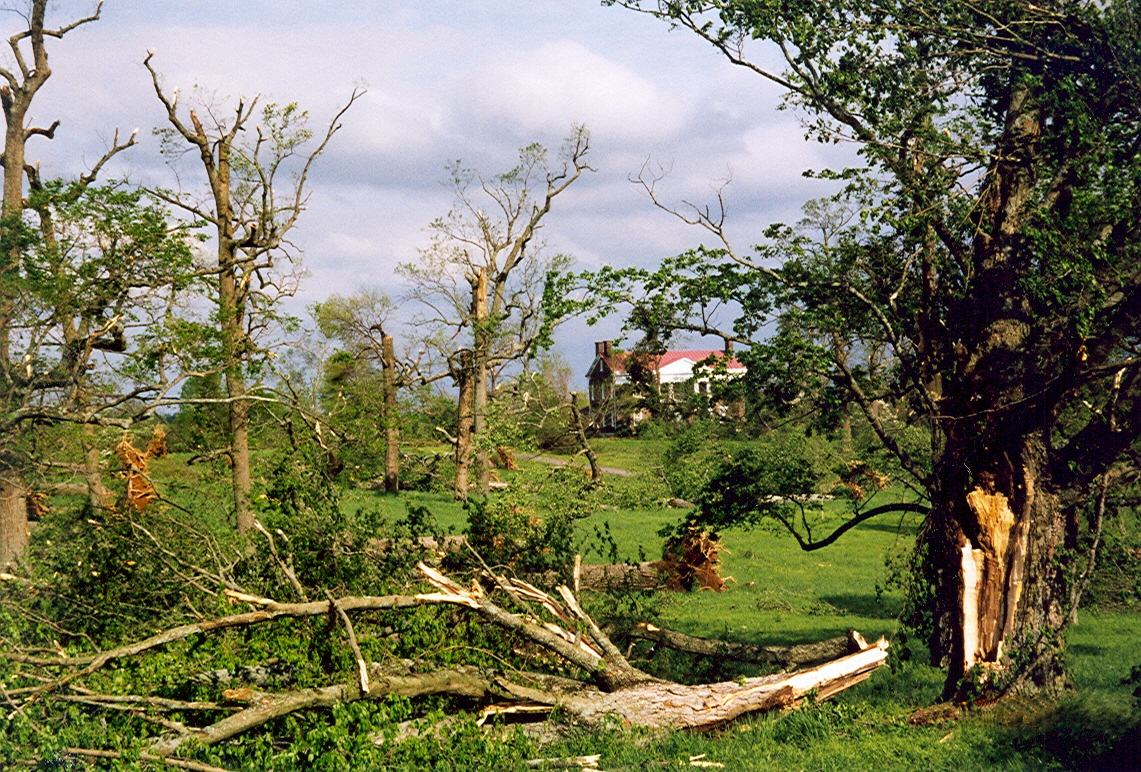
- Tornado damage to trees near The Hermitage

Meteorological history
- Date: April 15–16, 1998
- Duration: 1 day, 7 hours, 30 minutes

Tornado outbreak
- Tornadoes: 63
- Max. rating: F5 tornado

Overall effects
- Fatalities: 12
- Injuries: 120 (approximately)
- Damage: >$133 million (1998 USD)
- Areas affected: Midwestern and Southern United States
- Part of the tornado outbreaks of 1998

The tornado outbreak of April 15–16, 1998, also known as the 1998 Nashville tornado outbreak, was a two-day tornado outbreak that affected portions of the Midwestern United States, Mississippi and Tennessee Valleys on April 15 and April 16, 1998, with the worst of the outbreak taking place on the second day. On that day, 13 tornadoes swept through Middle Tennessee—two of them touching down in Nashville, causing significant damage to the downtown and East Nashville areas. Nashville became the first major city in nearly 20 years to have an F2 or stronger tornado make a direct hit in the downtown area.

In addition, the outbreak produced several other destructive tornadoes in Middle Tennessee. One of them, southwest of Nashville, was an F5 tornado—one of only two (the only official one) ever recorded in the state (the other, unofficial however, being in Pinson, Tennessee in 1923). That tornado remained mainly in rural areas of Wayne and Lawrence counties. Other tornadoes during the 2-day outbreak struck Arkansas, Alabama, Illinois, and Kentucky.

12 people were killed by tornadoes during the outbreak: two in Arkansas, three in Kentucky, and seven in Tennessee (one in Nashville, three in Wayne County, and three more elsewhere).

This tornado outbreak occurred at the end of the record-setting 1997–1998 El Niño event.

== Meteorological synopsis ==
Outbreak death toll
State	Total	County	County total
Arkansas	2	Mississippi	2
Kentucky	3	Barren	2
Kentucky	3	Metcalfe	1
Tennessee	8	Bradley	1
Tennessee	8	Davidson	2
Tennessee	8	Dyer	2
Tennessee	8	Wayne	3
Totals	12		
All deaths were tornado-related

One week after the Birmingham tornado outbreak took place across Alabama and Georgia on April 8–9, 1998 and several other Midwestern and Eastern United States states on April 6–7, a similar pattern developed across the Midwest and southeastern United States starting on April 16, 1998. A very strong low pressure system developed across the central part of North America and was associated with a long cold front. Ahead of the storm, the warm moist air generated from the Gulf of Mexico increased the likelihood for a significant weather event. On April 15, activity developed across the Mid-Mississippi Valley and southern Ohio Valley where several tornadoes touched down in Illinois starting in the late afternoon before moving into Arkansas during the overnight hours where the first fatalities were reported.

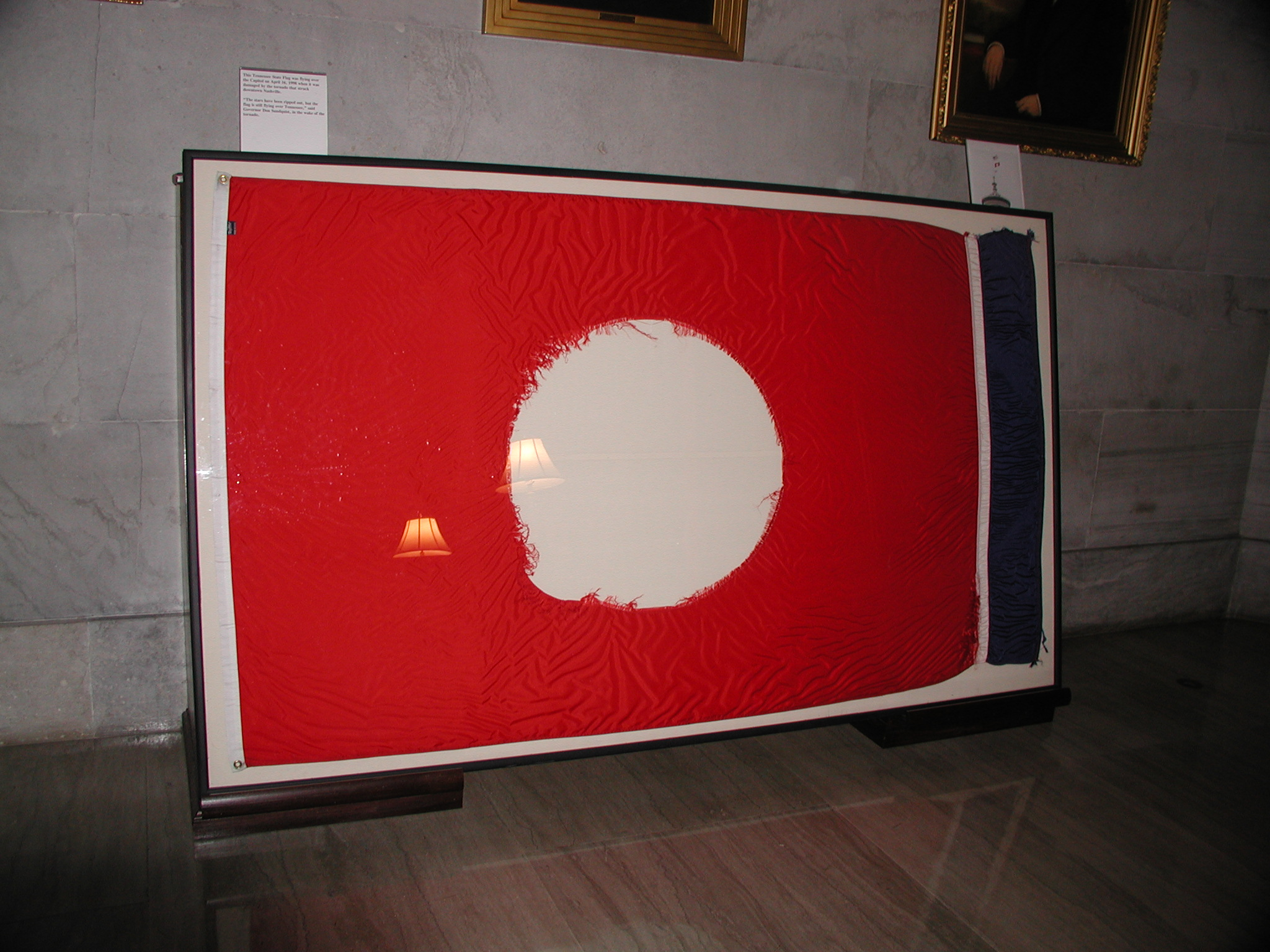
The Tennessee state flag which flew over the Capitol during the outbreak; its middle three-star emblem was ripped out during the storm. This flag is on display at the Tennessee State Capitol.

On April 16, as the main low-pressure system was near the Great Lakes and its cold front crossing the Mississippi River, dew points reached the mid to upper 60s across the Tennessee Valley while later in the day, CAPE values reached 1600 J/kg while dry air intrusion was also on the rise increasing the threat of severe weather across the area. As the bulk of the supercells moved out of Arkansas, the tornadic activity was slower during the morning hours before re-intensifying west of Nashville early in the afternoon. Major tornadoes struck from southern Tennessee to southern Kentucky with additional storms as far north as Michigan and several other storms in Alabama across Walker and Cullman Counties, which was slightly north of the areas that were hardest hit by the previous outbreak.

== Confirmed tornadoes ==
Confirmed tornadoes by Fujita rating
FU	F0	F1	F2	F3	F4	F5	Total
0	25	17	10	7	3	1	63

=== Downtown Nashville–Mount Juliet, Tennessee ===
Downtown Nashville, Tennessee
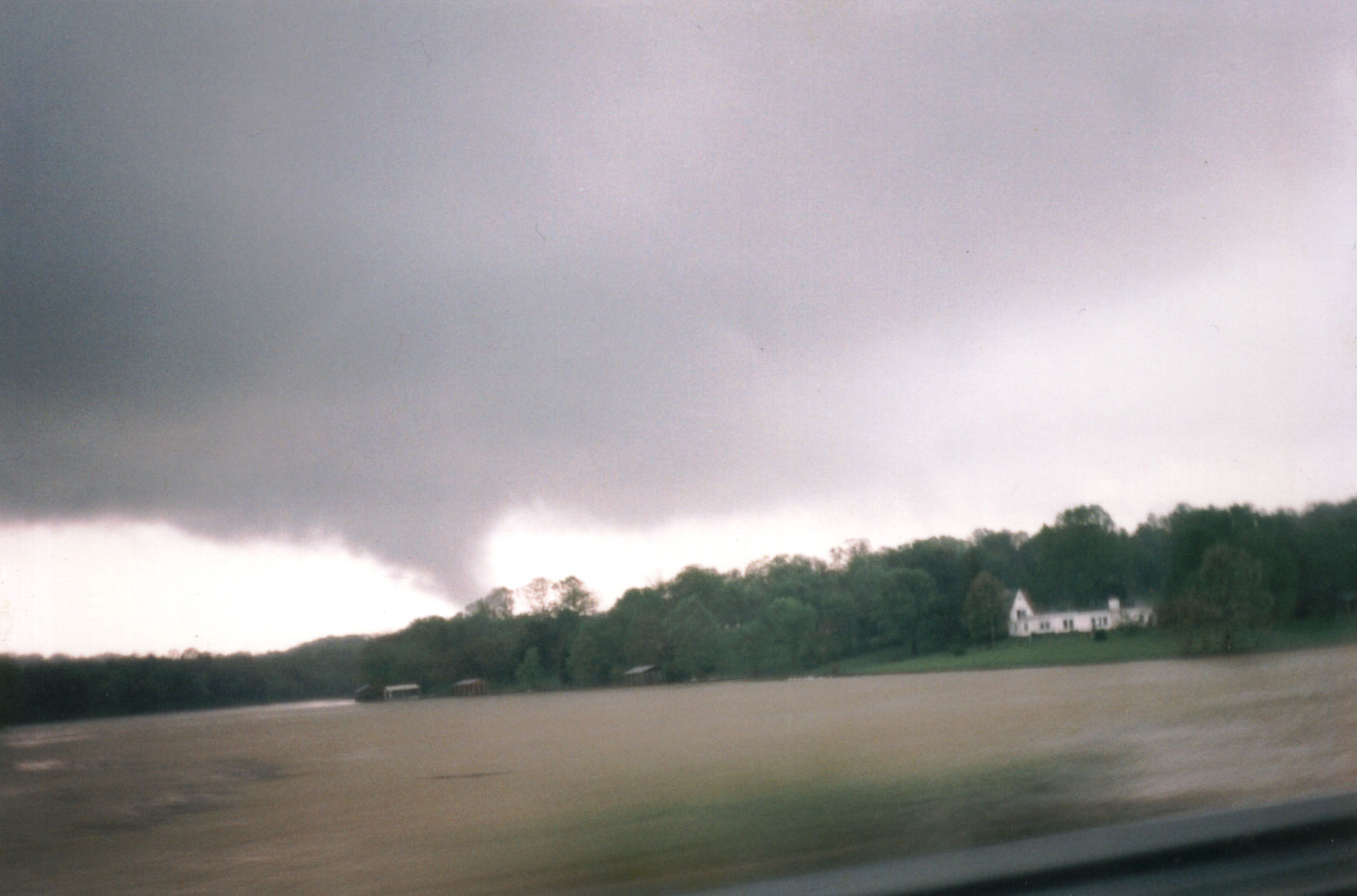
- The tornado as it was tracking through Mount Juliet.

Meteorological history
- Date: April 16, 1998 , 3:30 pm. CDT (UTC−05:00)
- Dissipated: April 16, 1998 , 3:54 pm. CDT (UTC−05:00)
- Duration: 24 minutes

F3 tornado
- on the Fujita scale
- Highest winds: 158–206 mph (254–332 km/h)

Overall effects
- Fatalities: 1
- Injuries: 60
- Damage: $100 million (1998 USD)

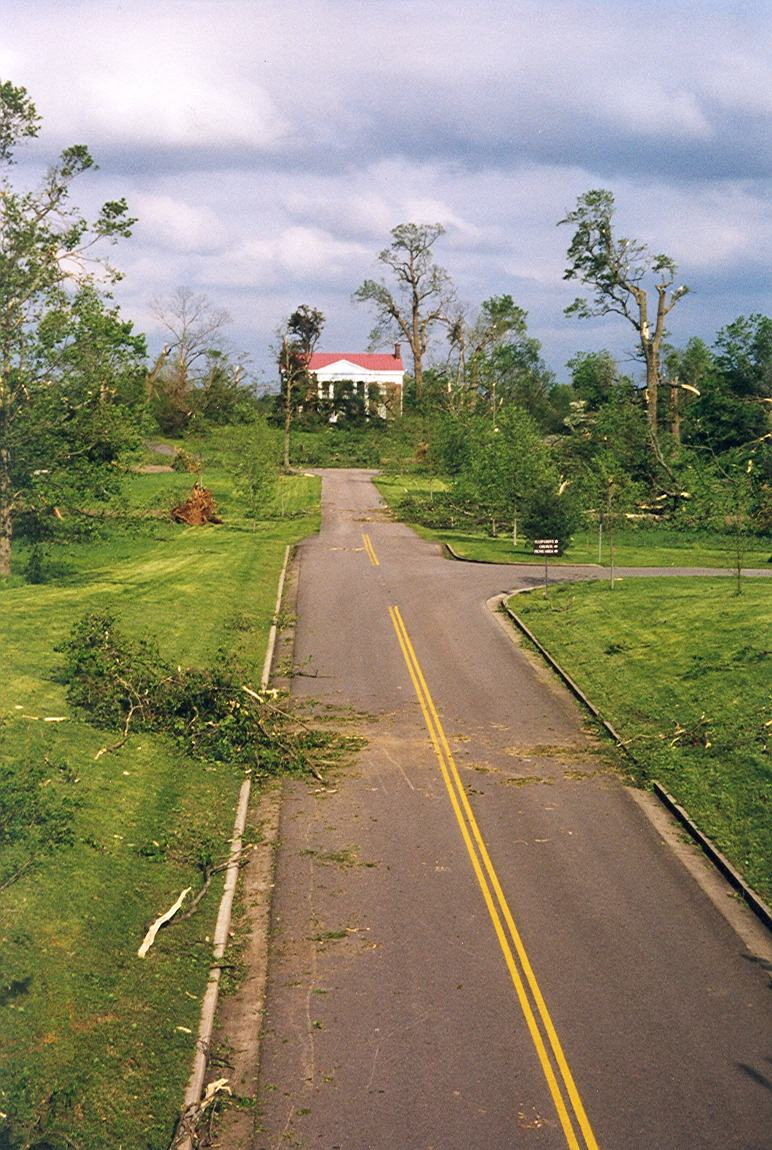
Damage near the Tulip Grove Mansion, part of The Hermitage

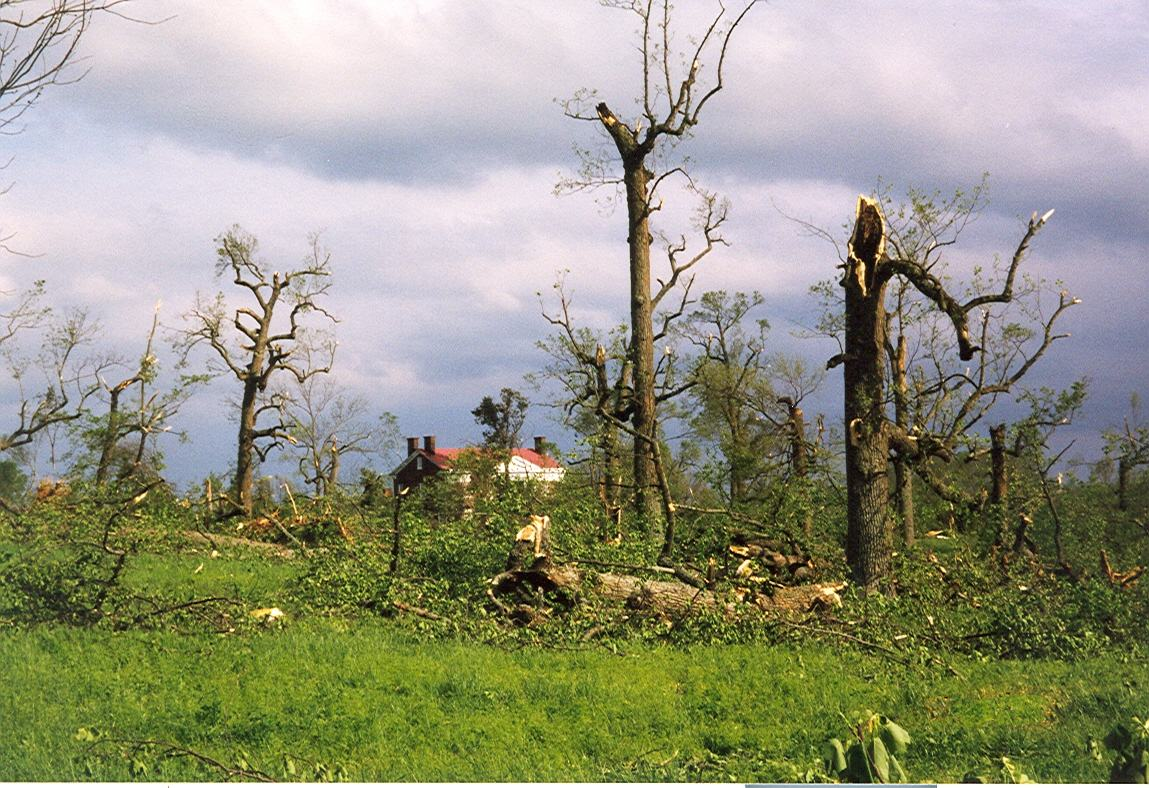
More damage near the Tulip Grove Mansion

This intense and significant tornado touched down near the intersection of Charlotte Pike and Forty-Sixth Avenue and traveled directly through downtown Nashville. The tornado manifested itself as a large area of rapidly rotating rain curtains and dark clouds, rather than a traditional funnel. After crossing the Cumberland River, it passed through East Nashville, Donelson, and Hermitage before finally lifting northwest of Lebanon in extreme northern Wilson County. An ROTC student from Vanderbilt University was trapped under a fallen tree in Centennial Park and later died from his injuries. The tornado blew many windows out of office buildings. Many large buildings, including skyscrapers, were damaged. The TPAC building had over 100 windows blown out. 30 small airplanes were damaged at Cornelia Fort Airport. 35 total buildings in downtown Nashville were deemed structurally unsound after the tornado. The tornado blew down 3 construction cranes on the construction site of the Tennessee Oilers' football stadium near the Cumberland River, before crossing the river. Many signs were downed throughout downtown as well.

The tornado continued east and hit the residential section of East Nashville. At least 300 homes were damaged in East Nashville, many of which lost a good part of their roofs, with a few destroyed. Trees were uprooted and telephone poles were knocked down in this area. A nursing home was hit and all the residents had to be evacuated. A church, which was well over 100 years old, received major damage. It then re-crossed the Cumberland River, where more trees were downed and more homes and other buildings were damaged across Donelson and Hermitage. Over a thousand trees were blown down at Andrew Jackson's home, The Hermitage. Some of those trees were well over 200 years old, with a few having been planted by Andrew Jackson himself.

The tornado moved into Wilson County, downing many trees, power lines, and signs. Several homes suffered mostly roof damage in the area. A baseball field and a lumber yard were damaged in Mt. Juliet. Part of the roof was taken off a bank in Mt. Juliet as well. The tornado then continued across rural Wilson County and produced sporadic damage before it dissipated just south of the Cumberland River in extreme northern Wilson County. A 2013 reanalysis noted that tornado would have likely been rated EF2 if the Enhanced Fujita Scale was operational at that time.

Nearly 22 years later, a long-tracked high-end EF3 tornado passed just north of Downtown Nashville just after midnight on March 3, 2020. That tornado moved along a more easterly path that intersected with the path of this tornado in East Nashville. It then continued east along Interstate 40 through Wilson and Smith counties. That tornado killed five people, injured 220, and caused $1.504 billion in damage, making it the 6th costliest tornado in US history.

=== Lawrence County, Tennessee ===
Lawrence County, Tennessee
- The tornado in rural Lawrence County.

Meteorological history
- Formed: April 16, 1998 , 4:30 p.m. CDT (UTC−05:00)
- Dissipated: April 16, 1998 , 4:43 p.m. CDT (UTC−05:00)
- Duration: 13 minutes

F5 tornado
- on the Fujita scale
- Highest winds: 261–318 mph (420–512 km/h)

Overall effects
- Fatalities: 0
- Injuries: 21
- Damage: $4 million (1998 USD)

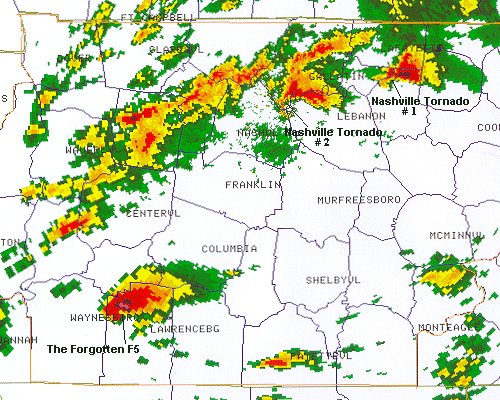
NOAA radar image of the Nashville and southwestern Tennessee supercells.

No fatalities were reported with this large and violent F5 wedge tornado as it touched down just inside Wayne County and traveled through sparsely populated areas of Lawrence County, west and northwest of Lawrenceburg. There were 21 injuries, however. It did not significantly affect any towns along its 19.3 miles (31.1 km) path and 13 minute existence.

However, many large and well-built homes with anchor bolts were completely leveled with some swept clean from their foundations, and vehicles were thrown hundreds of yards. One truck was rumored to have been taken about 20 miles (32 km), though this was never confirmed. A 200-foot section of grass was scoured away at a pasture, leaving only bare soil behind. Clumps of dirt were pulled up as well. Many trees and power lines were downed as well as 75 utility poles. Some of the trees were completely debarked, and several livestock were killed as well.

It is the most recent Tennessee F5/EF5 and only official one as the March 11, 1923 Pinson tornado took place before the introduction of the Fujita scale and before records were officially kept.

This tornado originally extended from Hardin County southeast of Savannah through Wayne, Lawrence, Giles, and Maury counties as one long-track F5. A 2013 reanalysis determined there were three separate tornadoes with distinct path breaks. The first tornado was rated high-end F4 in Hardin and Wayne counties. The second was the F5 tornado in Lawrence County, and the third, another rated F4, tracked from northern Lawrence through Giles and Maury counties. Due to the media coverage surrounding the Nashville tornado, this tornado has been referred to as "The Forgotten F5".

=== Other tornadoes ===
==== South Central Kentucky ====
South Central Kentucky also received severe weather from this outbreak. The most notable of the storms that occurred in South Central Kentucky that day was a particularly strong supercell storm that dumped baseball-sized hail on central Warren County including the Bowling Green central business district and Western Kentucky University causing massive amounts of damage to cars as well as structures. The storm also caused flash flooding in the area of WKU's main campus. The damage from the hail was so great that it seemed to overshadow the F3 tornado event happening in the southern part of the county, which was more rural. The tornado then moved into Barren County actually crossing a bend in the northern portion of Barren River Lake near the small town of Lucas. The tornado then would pass just south of downtown Glasgow and cross the Cumberland Parkway just west of the Barren/Metcalfe county line. It would then dissipate right at that county line. An F2 tornado was later spawned by this supercell in Metcalfe County, crossing the Cumberland Parkway in the western part of the county and passing just to the south of the county seat, Edmonton.

== See also ==
- List of North American tornadoes and tornado outbreaks
  - List of F5 and EF5 tornadoes
- List of tornadoes striking downtown areas
- March 1933 Nashville tornado outbreak
- Tornado outbreak of April 6–8, 2006 – Nine fatalities in the Nashville area
- Tornado outbreak of March 2–3, 2020
