= Hickoryville, Ohio =

Unincorporated community in Ohio, U.S.

Coordinates: 39°27′56″N 83°59′44″W

Hickoryville is an unincorporated community in Warren County, in the U.S. state of Ohio.

== History ==
The community was named for a grove of hickory trees near the original town site.
