= Portland, Kentucky =

Unincorporated community in Kentucky, United States

Portland
- Unincorporated community
- Location within the state of Kentucky Portland (the United States)
- Coordinates: 37°7′14″N 85°26′46″W
- Country: United States
- State: Kentucky
- County: Adair
- Elevation: 722 ft (220 m)
- Time zone: UTC-6 (Central (CST))
  - Summer (DST): UTC-5 (CDT)
- GNIS feature ID: 508859

Portland is an unincorporated community in Adair County, Kentucky, United States. Its elevation is 722 feet (220 m).

== History ==
On April 16, 1998, an F3 tornado struck Portland before traveling to nearby Pellyton, where most of its damage occurred. Fourteen homes were heavily damaged or destroyed, and three mobile homes and 27 barns were destroyed. A total of 30 homes, 84 barns, two schools, and eight businesses were affected.
