= Spencer, South Dakota =

- City
- Location in McCook County and the state of South Dakota
- Coordinates: 43°43′39″N 97°35′28″W
- Country: United States
- State: South Dakota
- County: McCook
- Incorporated: 1917

Area
  - Total: 0.27 sq mi (0.69 km^{2})
  - Land: 0.27 sq mi (0.69 km^{2})
  - Water: 0 sq mi (0.00 km^{2})
- Elevation: 1,381 ft (421 m)

Population (2020)
  - Total: 136
  - Density: 507.2/sq mi (195.83/km^{2})
- Time zone: UTC-6 (Central (CST))
  - Summer (DST): UTC-5 (CDT)
- ZIP code: 57374
- Area code: 605
- FIPS code: 46-60060
- GNIS feature ID: 1267589
- Website: spencersd.com

Spencer is a city in McCook County, South Dakota, United States. The population was 136 at the 2020 census. The city was almost destroyed by a violent F4 tornado on May 30, 1998 which killed six people.

== History ==
Spencer was laid out in 1887 when the railroad was extended to that point. The city was named for H. Spencer, a railroad official. A post office has been in operation in Spencer since 1887. Spencer was officially incorporated in 1917.

=== 1998 tornado ===
On May 30, 1998, the most destructive and second deadliest tornado in South Dakota history struck Spencer. It began as a large, dust-cloaked tornado northwest of Farmer in Hanson County, concurrent with the demise of the "Fulton" tornado. Continuing toward the east-southeast, it struck several farmsteads before crossing the Hanson/McCook County line a half mile west-northwest of Spencer. At this time, the tornado was being observed by the OU Doppler on Wheels crew, whose mobile Doppler weather radar data showed up to 264 mph winds in the tornado a few tens of meters above ground level. The population of the town diminished soon after to less than half of what it was previous to the tornado, from 315 to 145 in April 1999, and has since hovered around that mark.

== Geography ==
According to the United States Census Bureau, the city has a total area of 0.27 square miles (0.70 km^{2}), all land.

== Demographics ==
Historical population
Census	Pop.	Note	%±
1900	332		—
1910	506		52.4%
1920	637		25.9%
1930	561		−11.9%
1940	617		10.0%
1950	552		−10.5%
1960	460		−16.7%
1970	385		−16.3%
1980	380		−1.3%
1990	317		−16.6%
2000	157		−50.5%
2010	154		−1.9%
2020	136		−11.7%
U.S. Decennial Census

=== 2020 census ===
As of the 2020 census, Spencer had a population of 136. The median age was 48.0 years. 20.6% of residents were under the age of 18 and 26.5% of residents were 65 years of age or older. For every 100 females there were 106.1 males, and for every 100 females age 18 and over there were 107.7 males age 18 and over.

0.0% of residents lived in urban areas, while 100.0% lived in rural areas.

There were 62 households in Spencer, of which 22.6% had children under the age of 18 living in them. Of all households, 53.2% were married-couple households, 24.2% were households with a male householder and no spouse or partner present, and 16.1% were households with a female householder and no spouse or partner present. About 29.1% of all households were made up of individuals and 17.8% had someone living alone who was 65 years of age or older.

There were 72 housing units, of which 13.9% were vacant. The homeowner vacancy rate was 0.0% and the rental vacancy rate was 6.3%.

Racial composition as of the 2020 census
Race	Number	Percent
White	132	97.1%
Black or African American	0	0.0%
American Indian and Alaska Native	4	2.9%
Asian	0	0.0%
Native Hawaiian and Other Pacific Islander	0	0.0%
Some other race	0	0.0%
Two or more races	0	0.0%
Hispanic or Latino (of any race)	0	0.0%

=== 2010 census ===
As of the census of 2010, there were 154 people, 60 households, and 47 families residing in the city. The population density was 570.4 inhabitants per square mile (220.2/km^{2}). There were 77 housing units at an average density of 285.2 per square mile (110.1/km^{2}). The racial makeup of the city was 96.8% White, 0.6% African American, and 2.6% from two or more races. Hispanic or Latino of any race were 2.6% of the population.

There were 60 households, of which 30.0% had children under the age of 18 living with them, 66.7% were married couples living together, 11.7% had a female householder with no husband present, and 21.7% were non-families. 20.0% of all households were made up of individuals, and 8.3% had someone living alone who was 65 years of age or older. The average household size was 2.57 and the average family size was 2.94.

The median age in the city was 42.7 years. 29.9% of residents were under the age of 18; 1.9% were between the ages of 18 and 24; 19.4% were from 25 to 44; 24.6% were from 45 to 64; and 24% were 65 years of age or older. The gender makeup of the city was 48.1% male and 51.9% female.

=== 2000 census ===
As of the census of 2000, there were 157 people, 64 households, and 44 families residing in the city. The population density was 596.7 inhabitants per square mile (230.4/km^{2}). There were 73 housing units at an average density of 277.4 per square mile (107.1/km^{2}). The racial makeup of the city was 98.73% White, 0.64% Native American and 0.64% Asian.

There were 64 households, out of which 31.3% had children under the age of 18 living with them, 59.4% were married couples living together, 6.3% had a female householder with no husband present, and 31.3% were non-families. 31.3% of all households were made up of individuals, and 20.3% had someone living alone who was 65 years of age or older. The average household size was 2.45 and the average family size was 3.05.

In the city, the population was spread out, with 28.7% under the age of 18, 6.4% from 18 to 24, 25.5% from 25 to 44, 21.7% from 45 to 64, and 17.8% who were 65 years of age or older. The median age was 37 years. For every 100 females, there were 86.9 males. For every 100 females age 18 and over, there were 80.6 males.

The median income for a household in the city was $21,250, and the median income for a family was $34,688. Males had a median income of $26,250 versus $22,500 for females. The per capita income for the city was $13,164. About 7.0% of families and 11.4% of the population were below the poverty line, including 14.6% of those under the age of eighteen and 14.8% of those 65 or over.

== See also ==
- Late-May 1998 tornado outbreak and derecho
