= 1998 Oak Grove–Birmingham tornado =

1998 Tornado in Alabama

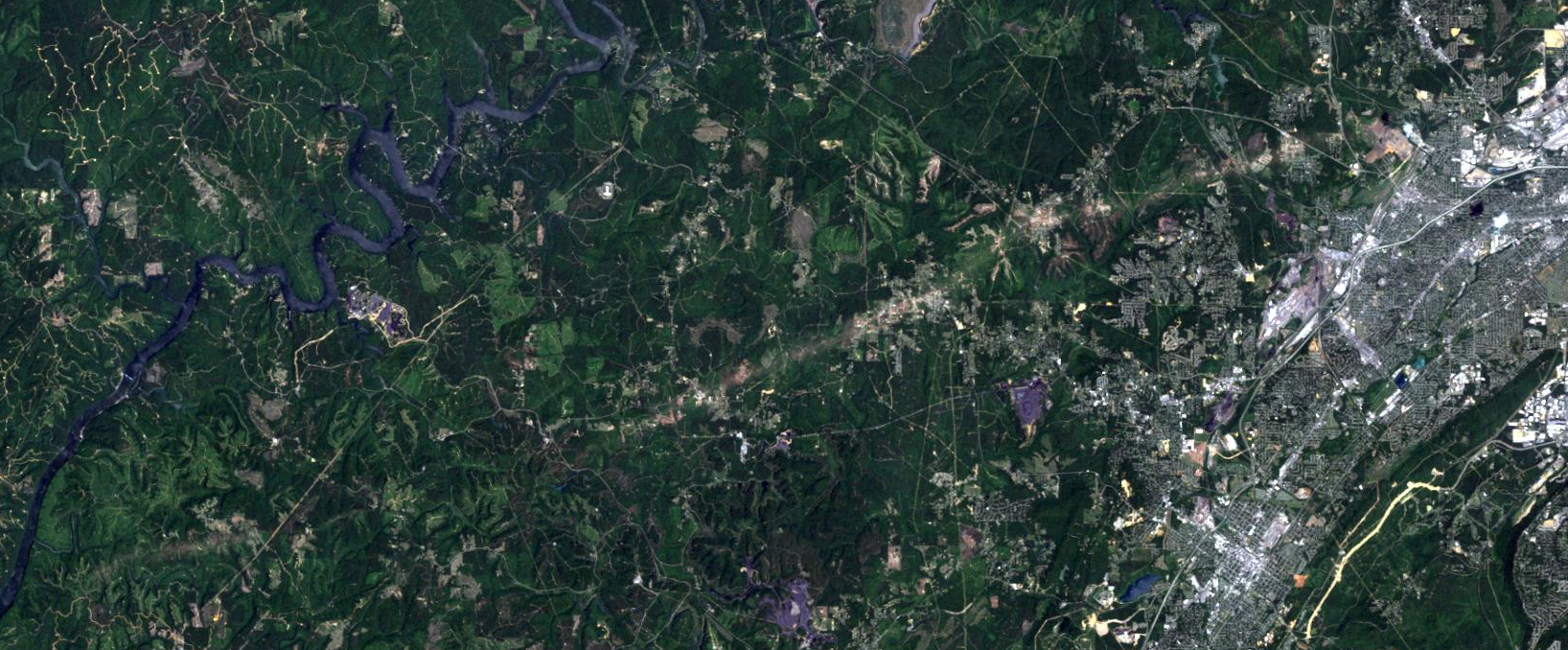
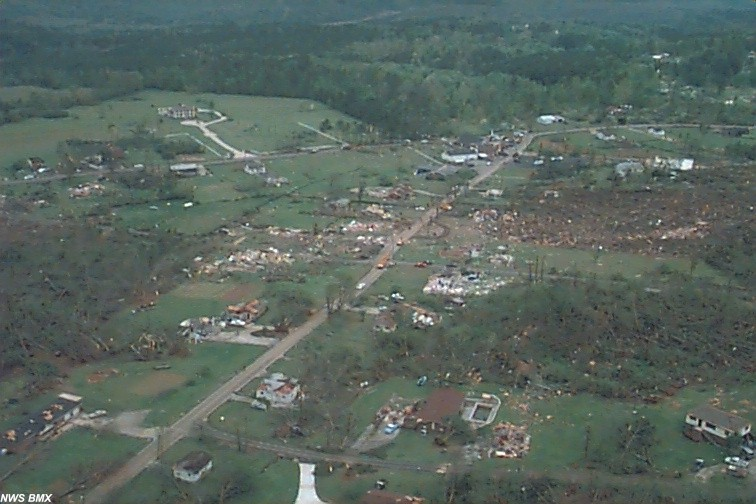
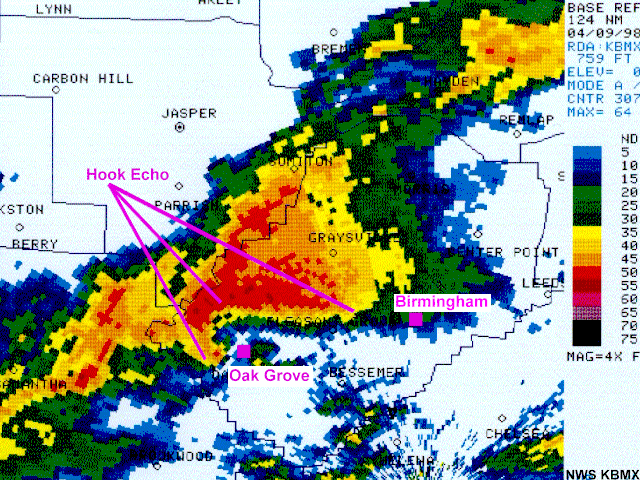
- Counterclockwise from top A satellite view of the tornado's track across Tuscaloosa and Jefferson counties. An aerial view of F5 tornado damage in Rock Creek. A radar still-image of the tornado as it approached Oak Grove.

Meteorological history
- Date: April 8, 1998
- Formed: April 8, 1998, 7:42 p.m. CDT (UTC–05:00)
- Dissipated: April 8, 1998, 8:28 p.m. CDT (UTC–05:00)
- Duration: 46 minutes

F5 tornado
- on the Fujita scale
- Highest winds: >260 mph (420 km/h)

Overall effects
- Fatalities: 32
- Injuries: 259
- Damage: $202.83 million (1998 USD)
- Part of the Tornado outbreak of April 6–9, 1998 and Tornadoes of 1998

In the evening hours of April 8, 1998, a violent and deadly tornado devastated multiple suburban communities of Birmingham, Alabama, primarily Oak Grove, Rock Creek, Edgewater, and McDonald Chapel. The tornado was part of a larger tornado outbreak which included the Great Plains, Dixie Alley, and the Carolinas, tracking for 30.3 miles through Tuscaloosa and Jefferson Counties in Central Alabama, killing 32 people, injuring a further 259, and causing $202.83 million (1998 USD) in damages. The tornado was given an official rating of F5 on the Fujita Scale.

The tornado began in rural Tuscaloosa County at 7:42 PM CDT, entering Jefferson County shortly after, producing F1 damage. However within minutes, the tornado strengthened to F3 intensity as it entered Oak Grove, destroying a high school and fire station, three people were killed as the tornado destroyed a mobile home. The tornado then intensified further to F5 intensity as it impacted the town of Rock Creek, where many homes were destroyed or swept away. 11 people were killed here. The tornado struck two power transmission lines just to the east, cutting off power to western Birmingham. The tornado then weakened before striking the town of Sylvan Springs at F4 intensity, where more homes were destroyed and four were killed. Shortly thereafter, the tornado intensified to F5 once again, striking the communities of Edgewater and McDonald Chapel. The tornado killed 14 people in this area, with multiple homes being swept away. It then began to weaken as it left McDonald Chapel, entering Northern Birmingham at F3 intensity shortly after, causing substantial damage to homes in the Pratt City Neighborhood. The tornado would then lift a few miles to the east of Birmingham International Airport, 3 mi (4.8 km) north of Interstate 20 along Highway 78.

As of 2026, the Oak Grove–Birmingham tornado was the last F5 to hit the state of Alabama before the adoption of the Enhanced Fujita Scale in 2007. Since then, two more EF5 tornadoes occurred in the state in 2011, with one impacting Hackleburg and Phil Campbell, while the other impacting Rainsville, killing 71 and 25 people respectively.

== Meteorological synopsis ==
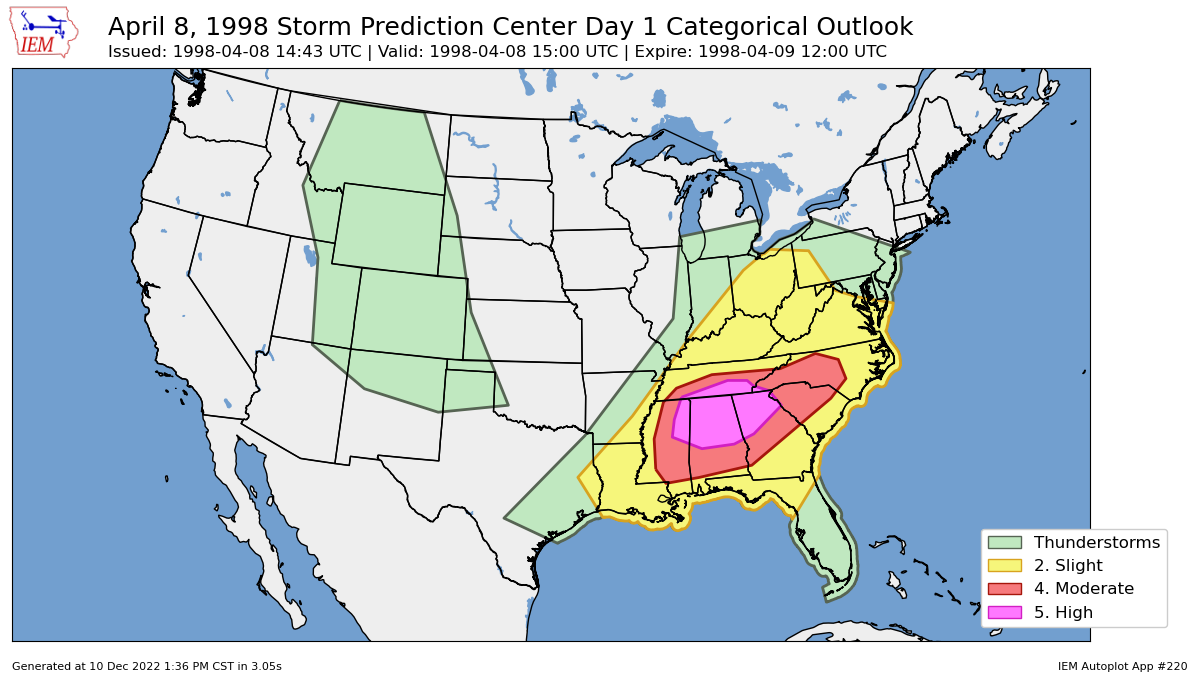
Storm Prediction Center Outlook for April 8, 1998. A High Risk was issued and lasted for the entire Outlook Cycle.

A highly unstable atmospheric environment was present over the deep south on April 8, 1998. A strong jet stream was active, and a low-pressure system was moving northeast from Iowa to southern Minnesota. At the same time, a weather disturbance from Texas was moving east into eastern Texas. Winds over 120 kts in the upper atmosphere were affecting north-central Texas on the evening of April 7 and moving into the lower Mississippi Valley by the evening of April 8.

In the about 700-500 mb area of the atmosphere, a strong weather front was developing over the southern plains in the morning and moved east into the lower Mississippi Valley by the evening. There was a "dry punch" in the southwest flow (a dry air mass) moving over southern Louisiana and southwestern Alabama in the evening. Closer to the surface, warm, moist air from the Gulf of Mexico was being pushed northward by south winds, causing temperatures and dew points to rise throughout the southeastern U.S.

By 6:00 p.m. UTC, CAPE values was recorded at 1300 J/kg and increased to 2370 J/kg by midnight. A very dry layer of air above 700 mb caused a steep temperature decrease with height, indicating instability. Storm relative helicity values increased from 55 to 220 m²/s² between 6:00 p.m. UTC and midnight, and the next forecast model predicted even higher helicity values in northern Alabama. In the lower levels of the atmosphere, wind shear increased from 18 to 26 m/s (35 to 50 knots) between 6:00 p.m. UTC and midnight.

The Storm Prediction Center issued a high risk for severe thunderstorms across northern Mississippi, Alabama, and northwest Georgia, that lasted the entire outlook cycle on April 8. At 2:00 p.m. CDT on April 8, the SPC issued the first Tornado Watch for northern and central Mississippi and northern and central Alabama, which was valid until 8:00 p.m. CDT. Multiple more tornado watches were issued at 7:30 p.m., 7:36 p.m., and 1:15 a.m. respectively.

== Tornado summary ==
=== Tuscaloosa County ===
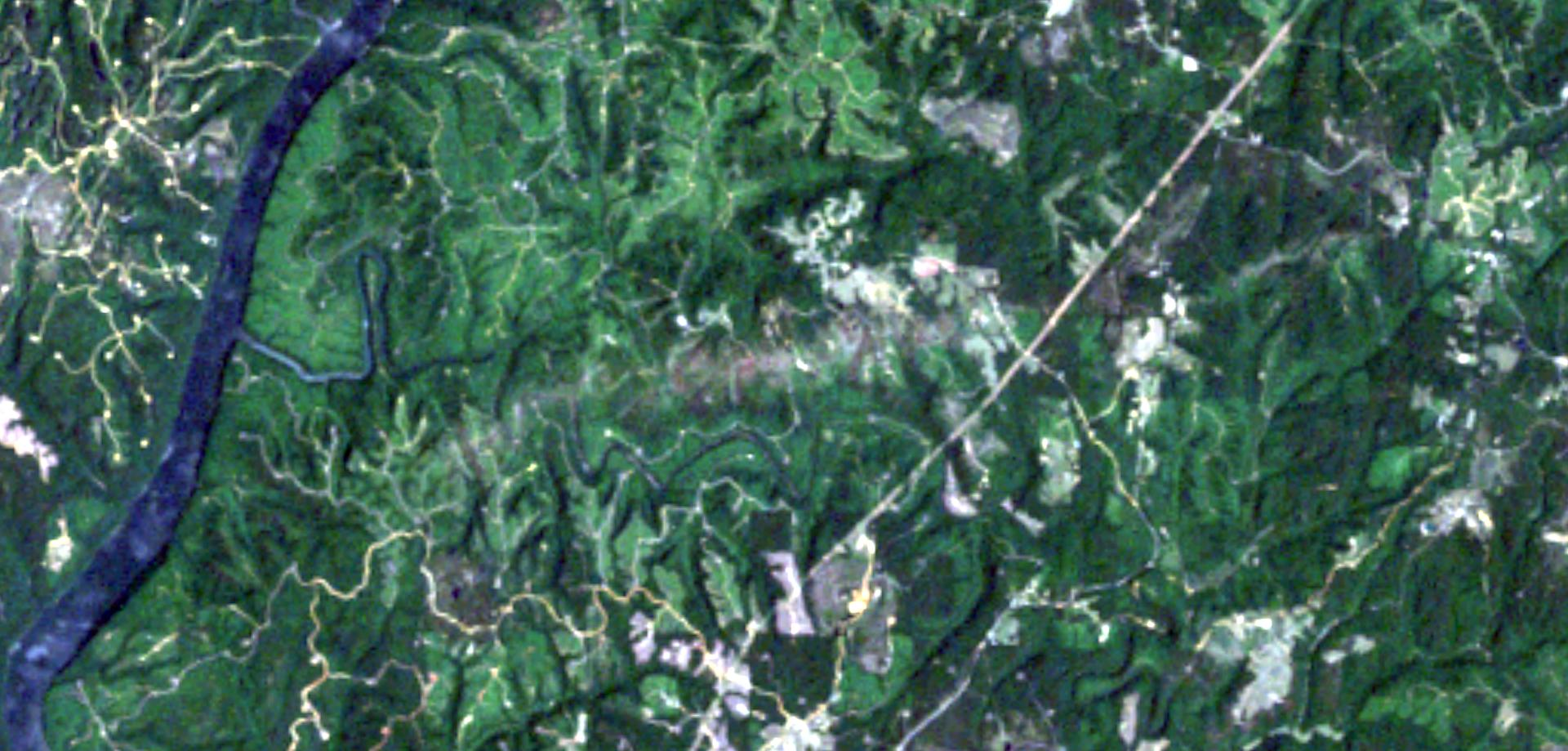
Satellite image of the tornado track through eastern Tuscaloosa County

A high precipitation supercell formed along the Mississippi–Alabama border and quickly became tornadic, producing an F3 tornado which tracked through rural areas north of Tuscaloosa, Alabama. The parent supercell then cycled and produced the Oak Grove–Birmingham tornado in eastern Tuscaloosa County at 7:42 PM CDT, around 1.5 miles east of the Warrior River. At 7:45 PM a tornado warning was issued for Jefferson County. The tornado produced F0 damage to structures, destroying 1,000 acres of forest during its track through Tuscaloosa County. The tornado struck the community of Bull City before crossing into Jefferson County shortly after.

=== Oak Grove ===
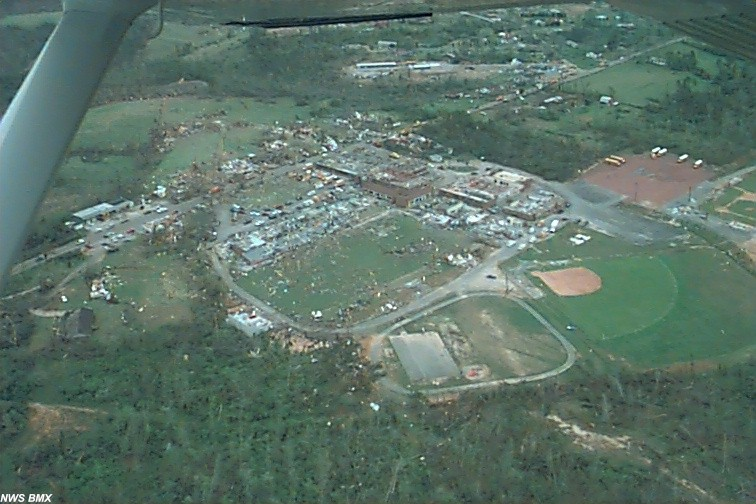
Oak Grove High School after the tornado

At 7:50 PM CDT, the tornado entered Jefferson County at F0 intensity. However within minutes of entering Jefferson County, the tornado quickly intensified to F3 strength as the tornado entered the community of Oak Grove. The tornado destroyed a mobile home with four occupants inside, only one of which survived. Oak Grove High School was struck shortly after, where a cheerleader squad consisting of 25 people were practicing in the school's gymnasium when the tornado hit. All 25 sheltered in the school's lobby, which was the only part of the school to avoid collapse as the support beams bent from the center over the lobby, shielding it from debris. Debris consisting of metal lockers, concrete blocks, bleachers, and other materials littered the gymnasium floor, sometimes up to 3 ft (0.91 m) deep. All 25 cheerleaders sustained minor injuries. The tornado then destroyed the eastern Concord fire station in Oak Grove as it crossed County Road 23/54.

=== Rock Creek and Sylvan Springs ===
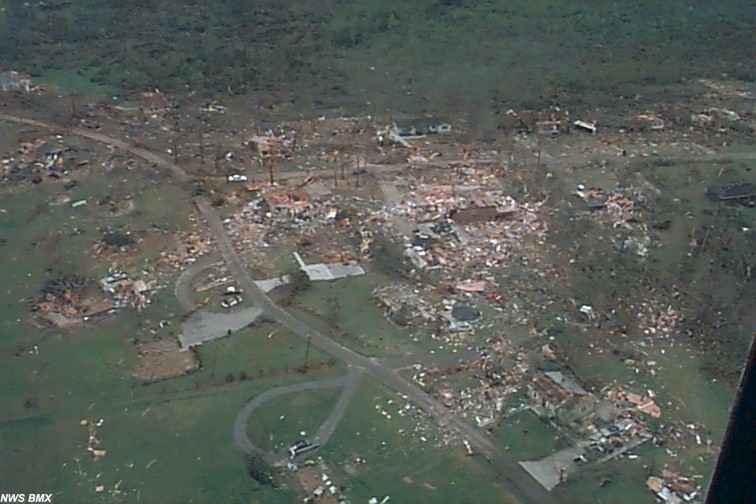
F4 Damage in Sylvan Springs

The tornado intensified and grew in size as it crossed Warrior River Road into Rock Creek, reaching F5 intensity for the first time as it damaged or destroyed multiple homes. The Central Concord Volunteer Fire Station was also destroyed. The Rock Creek Church of God's Family Life Center had its roof torn off, becoming a makeshift trauma center in the wake of the tornado to treat the injured. 11 people were killed in Rock Creek as multiple homes were swept clean by winds in excess of 260 mph (420 km/h). After exiting Rock Creek, the tornado toppled large power transmission lines from the Miller Steam Plant electric generating station north of Rock Creek. The resulting power surge caused the western side of Birmingham to lose all power, captured on live television on the ABC 33/40 tower camera as meteorologist James Spann was covering the tornado. The tornado then weakened slightly as it entered Sylvan Springs, where multiple additional homes in the area would be destroyed at F4 intensity, killing an additional four people. The tornado tracked through mostly rural areas after leaving Sylvan Springs, although a few homes north of Pleasant Grove were destroyed.

=== Edgewater and McDonald Chapel ===
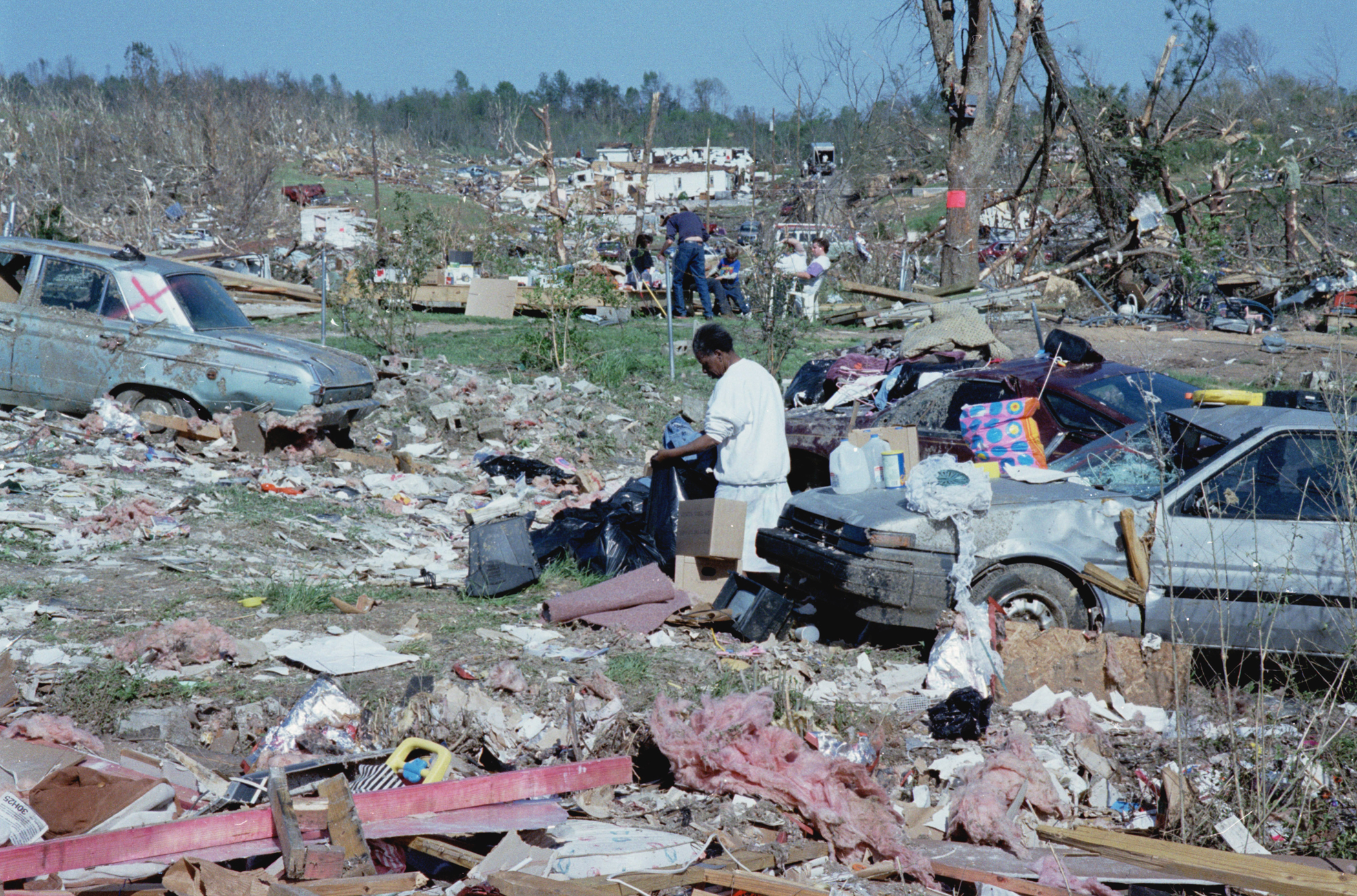
Damage in McDonald Chapel

After tracking through mostly rural areas past Sylvan Springs, the tornado struck the community of Edgewater, causing very erratic damage as some homes received light damage, while others along the block were completely destroyed. The tornado then intensified to F5 strength once again as it entered McDonald Chapel, sweeping multiple homes off their foundations and destroying countless more as it tracked through the town. At the Open Door Baptist Church in McDonald Chapel, 67 people were gathered for Wednesday Night Prayer Meeting. The church received a warning about the incoming tornado around 15 minutes prior to the tornado striking the church, causing everyone to shelter in one long hallway. As the tornado struck the church, the roof and multiple exterior walls collapsed, while the hallway the churchgoers were gathered in remained intact, protecting the lives of all 67 people, though multiple sustained injuries when flying debris struck like missiles. Multiple cars in the church's parking lot were picked up and tossed into a nearby ravine. In both Edgewater and McDonald Chapel, 13 people were killed.

=== Birmingham ===
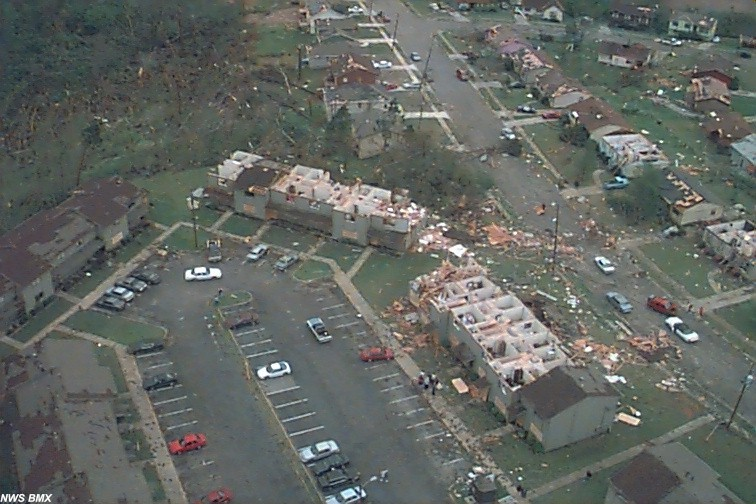
F3 damage to apartment buildings in Sandusky

After tracking through McDonald Chapel, the tornado crossed Alabama 269 into Birmingham. The tornado killed an additional person as it struck the neighborhood of West Ensley. The supercell then detached from the outflow boundary around this time, and the tornado began to weaken. Having weakened to F3 intensity, the tornado entered the neighborhoods of Sandusky and North Pratt. The tornado removed the roof from apartment buildings in Sandusky, and destroyed more homes in North Pratt. Shortly after, at around 8:28 PM, the tornado dissipated in the neighborhood of Pratt City. The tornado traveled 30.6 mi (49.2 km) and lasted an hour and 26 minutes on the ground

== Aftermath ==
=== Damages ===
608 homes were destroyed, 556 sustained major damage, and another 810 sustained minor damage according to an analysis by the American Red Cross. The US Forest Service estimated that 1,000 acres of timber were lost in Tuscaloosa County, and a further 4,000 were lost in Jefferson County, with trees being debarked so badly that they reflected in the moonlight. The tornado caused $202.83 million (1998 USD) in damages, and 32 people were killed, with most being in Rock Creek, Edgewater, and McDonald Chapel, and injured a further 259.

=== Historical Retrospective ===
At the time, the Oak Grove–Birmingham F5 tornado was the seventh deadliest in Alabama state history, and the worst tornado in Alabama since the Marion, Alabama F4 during the 1932 Deep South tornado outbreak. Since then, two other tornadoes have caused more deaths, with the 2011 Hackleburg–Phil Campbell EF5 killing 72, and the 2011 Tuscaloosa–Birmingham EF4 killing 64, the latter of which affected some of the same areas as the Oak Grove–Birmingham F5.

=== Safety report and subsequent findings ===
In a quick response report published in 1999, the recommendations in the report noted that NOAA weather radios were not heavily used even during times of severe weather, noting that efforts to make weather radios more available and efforts to teach about its utility and benefits needed to continue. In the same report, it was noted that tornado sirens were inconsistently and ineffectively used despite their availability, and that federal authorities needed to examine their standardization policies. A major finding was that tornado shelters were not available to a majority of people along the tornadoes path, with survivors stating that they wanted shelters but could not afford them. The report also noted that insurance policies were a significant factor in slowing down rebuilding efforts as they did not reward policy holders for investing in wind resistant methods such as foundation anchors or hurricane clips.

== See also ==
- Tornadoes of 1998
- 2011 Hackleburg–Phil Campbell tornado - the deadliest tornado to strike Alabama and the next tornado to be rated as an F5 or EF5 in the state
- 2011 Tuscaloosa–Birmingham tornado - A deadly EF4 tornado that had struck the Birmingham area 13 years later.
