= Orantes Grant =

American football player (born 1978)

No. 56, 57
- Position: Linebacker

Personal information
- Born: March 18, 1978 (age 48); Atlanta, Georgia, U.S.

Career information
- High school: Dunwoody (Dunwoody, Georgia)
- College: Georgia
- NFL draft: 2000: 7th round, 219th overall pick

Career history
- Dallas Cowboys (2000–2001); Washington Redskins (2002–2003); Cleveland Browns (2003)

Awards and highlights
- Second-team All-SEC (1999)

Career NFL statistics
- Games played: 26
- Total tackles: 32
- Forced fumbles: 1
- Fumble recoveries: 3
- Stats at Pro Football Reference

Orantes Laquay Grant (born March 18, 1978) is an American former professional football player who was a linebacker in the National Football League (NFL) for the Dallas Cowboys, Washington Redskins and Cleveland Browns. He played college football for the Georgia Bulldogs and was selected by the Cowboys in the seventh round of the 2000 NFL draft.

== Early life ==
Grant was a three-year starter at Dunwoody High School. As a sophomore in 1993, he helped his team win the AAAA state championship as a tight end. He was switched to linebacker as a senior, receiving All-State honors while making 130 tackles. He also had 78 carries for 570 rushing yards at running back.

He was named the DeKalb County Defensive Player of the Year award from the Dunwoody News and was listed in the Top 50 Georgia list by the Atlanta Journal-Constitution.

== College career ==
Grant accepted a football scholarship from the University of Georgia. As a freshman he was a backup, making 42 tackles (3 for loss) and one pass defensed.

As a sophomore in 1997, he was named the starter at weakside linebacker, registering 81 tackles (second on the team), 2.5 sacks, 3 quarterback pressures, 2 passes defensed and 2 forced fumbles (led the team). He had 10 tackles against Arkansas State University. He made 12 tackles against the University of Tennessee and the University of Kentucky.

As a junior in 1998, he posted 125 tackles (led the team), 80 solo tackles (led the team), 2.5 sacks, 5 quarterback pressures, 6 tackles for loss (second on the team), 5 passes defensed, one forced fumble and one fumble recovery. He had 22 tackles against the University of Kentucky and 14 against the University of Tennessee.

As a senior, his stats suffered because of a change in the defensive scheme. He made 69 tackles (second on the team), 46 solo tackles (led the team), 2 sacks, 3 quarterback pressures and 2 passes defensed. Against Vanderbilt University, he had 13 tackles and one sack. He made 10 tackles against Georgia Institute of Technology. He finished his career with 44 games, 312 tackles (13th in school history), 190 solo tackles (seventh in school history) and 15 sacks.

== Professional career ==
=== Dallas Cowboys ===
Grant was selected by the Dallas Cowboys in the seventh round (219th overall) of the 2000 NFL draft, reuniting with George Edwards who was his position coach in college. As a rookie, he was deactivated for the first 2 games. He was a backup behind Dexter Coakley and tied for fourth on the team with 11 special teams tackles.

In 2001, he appeared in 10 games (one start), while missing 3 contests with a torn meniscus and 2 with an ankle injury. He collected 16 defensive tackles (one for loss), one forced fumble, one fumble recovery and 8 special teams tackles (tied for fifth on the team). He was released on September 1, 2002.

=== Washington Redskins ===
On December 4, 2002, Grant was signed by the Washington Redskins as a free agent. He appeared in one game.

In 2003, he appeared in one game and was waived on October 28.

=== Cleveland Browns ===
On November 26, 2003, he signed with the Cleveland Browns as a free agent. He was released on December 3.
