= Allen DeGraffenreid (offensive lineman) =

American football player (born 1974)

No. 69
- Position: Offensive lineman

Personal information
- Born: June 3, 1974 (age 52); Kansas City, Missouri, U.S.
- Listed height: 6 ft 4 in (1.93 m)
- Listed weight: 293 lb (133 kg)

Career information
- High school: Dunwoody (Dunwoody, Georgia)
- College: Vanderbilt (1993–1996)
- NFL draft: 1997: undrafted

Career history
- Arizona Cardinals (1997–1998); Denver Broncos (2000)*
- * Offseason or practice squad member only
- Stats at Pro Football Reference

Allen DeGraffenreid (born June 3, 1974) is an American former professional football player who was an offensive lineman for one season with the Arizona Cardinals of the National Football League (NFL). He played college football for the Vanderbilt Commodores. He was also a member of the Denver Broncos.

== Early life and college ==
Allen DeGraffenreid was born on June 3, 1974, in Kansas City, Missouri. He has a twin brother, Bryan, who played with him in high school and college. He attended Dunwoody High School in Dunwoody, Georgia. He only played a single season of high school football, but was nonetheless a top-ranked prospect, being among the top 20 recruits in the state.

He was a member of the Vanderbilt Commodores from 1993 to 1996 and a three-year letterman from 1994 to 1996. He was a starter in his junior and senior seasons, playing at left tackle in 1995 before moving to guard in 1996. After his senior year, he was invited to the NFL Scouting Combine; his twin brother received an invite to the event as well.

== Professional career ==
After going undrafted in the 1997 NFL draft, DeGraffenreid signed with the Arizona Cardinals on April 21. He quit the team in July but later returned that same month. He was released on August 19 and signed to the Cardinals' practice squad on August 26, 1997. The next year, he made the team as a third-string center. He finished the 1998 season having appeared in five games. DeGraffenreid was released on September 5, 1999. He wore jersey number 69 while with the Cardinals. He stood 6'4" and was 293 pounds during his professional career.

DeGraffenreid was signed by the Denver Broncos on January 18, 2000. He was released on August 21, 2000.
