= Allen DeGraffenreid =

Allen DeGraffenreid may refer to:

- Allen DeGraffenreid (offensive lineman) (born 1974), American football player
- Allen DeGraffenreid (wide receiver) (born 1970), American football player
