= Tornado outbreak of April 6–9, 1998 =

Weather event in the United States

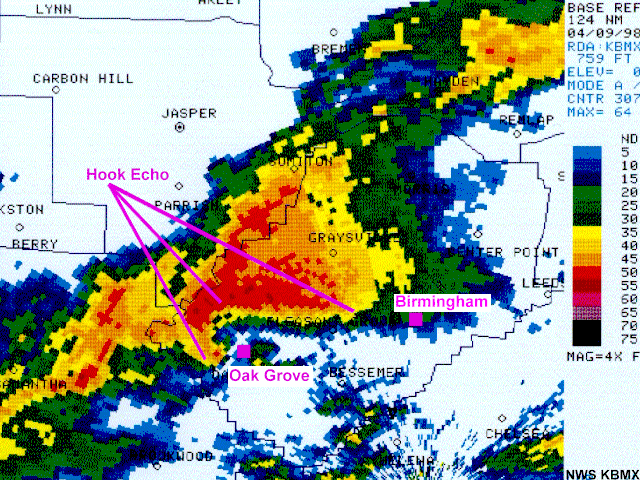
- Radar shot of the Birmingham supercell with the hook echo tornado signature located near Oak Grove.

Meteorological history
- Duration: April 6–9, 1998

Tornado outbreak
- Tornadoes: 62
- Max. rating: F5 tornado
- Duration: ~4 days

Overall effects
- Fatalities: 41
- Injuries: 250+
- Damage: $344.645 million (1998 USD)
- Areas affected: Midwestern and Eastern United States
- Part of the tornado outbreaks of 1998

The tornado outbreak of April 6–9, 1998 was a large tornado outbreak that started on April 6 across the Great Plains and ended on April 9 across the Carolinas and Georgia, in 1998. A total of 62 tornadoes touched down from the Middle Atlantic States to the Midwestern United States and Texas. The outbreak is infamous for producing a deadly F5 that tore through the suburbs of Birmingham, Alabama, killing 32 people. This tornado outbreak was responsible for 41 deaths: 7 in Georgia and 34 in Alabama.

== Confirmed tornadoes ==
Confirmed tornadoes by Fujita rating
FU	F0	F1	F2	F3	F4	F5	Total
0	39	13	7	2	0	1	62

=== April 6 event ===
F#	Location	County	Time (UTC)	Path length	Damage
Texas
F0	N of Elliott	Wilbarger	2313	0.1 miles (0.16 km)	Brief touchdown in a field.
Iowa
F0	NE of Adaza	Greene	2315	0.2 miles (0.32 km)	Brief touchdown with no damage.
F0	S of Dayton	Webster	2355	0.1 miles (0.16 km)	Brief touchdown with no damage.
F0	NE of Ralston	Greene	0000	0.2 miles (0.32 km)	Brief touchdown with no damage.
Kansas
F1	E of Schoenchen	Ellis	2325	3.3 miles (5.3 km)	Damage to a metal building, a chicken house and a quonset hut. 2 people were injured.
Oklahoma
F0	SE of Velma	Stephens	0145	0.1 miles (0.16 km)	Brief tornado in an open field.
Source: Tornado History Project - April 6, 1998 Storm Data

=== April 7 event ===
F#	Location	County	Time (UTC)	Path length	Damage
Illinois
F0	SW of Eden	Peoria	2101	0.1 miles (0.16 km)	Brief touchdown with no damage.
F0	NW of Clear Lake	Cass	2110	0.3 miles (0.5 km)	Caused minor damage to 5 cabins.
F2	NE of Clear Lake	Mason	2120	3 miles (4.8 km)	A frame house was moved from its foundation with an exterior wall blown off. Three outbuildings, two grain bins, and a barn were destroyed as well.
F1	NW of Bath	Mason	2135	0.3 miles (0.5 km)	Tornado damaged a frame house and destroyed its garage. Ten homes sustained moderate to major damage, with several others along with businesses suffering minor damage. Another garage was destroyed as well.
F0	NW of Ormonde	Warren	2231	0.1 miles (0.16 km)	
F0	Vermont area	Fulton	2235	0.1 miles (0.16 km)	Brief touchdown in a field.
F0	Monmouth area (1st tornado)	Warren	2242	0.1 miles (0.16 km)	
F1	Monmouth area (2nd tornado)	Warren	2252	0.5 miles (0.8 km)	Farm buildings were damaged or destroyed.
F0	SW of Havana	Mason	2255	0.1 miles (0.16 km)	Brief touchdown with no damage.
F1	NE of Monmouth	Warren	2302	0.1 miles (0.16 km)	
F2	NE of Havana	Fulton, Mason	2304	11 miles (17.6 km)	A mobile home and a machine shed were destroyed. Irrigation equipment was overturned and a pumping station was damaged.
F0	NW of Mount Pulaski	Logan	2305	0.1 miles (0.16 km)	Brief touchdown with no damage.
F0	S of Gerlaw	Warren	2313	0.1 miles (0.16 km)	Brief touchdown with damage to a cemetery.
F0	NW of Moweaqua	Christian	2314	0.1 miles (0.16 km)	Brief touchdown with no damage.
F0	NE of Pleak	Shelby	2328	0.1 miles (0.16 km)	Brief touchdown in a field.
F0	SE of Todds Point	Shelby	2340	0.1 miles (0.16 km)	Brief touchdown in a field.
F2	S of Cadwell to S of Arthur	Moultrie, Douglas	0008	11 miles (17.6 km)	29 homes and several barns and outbuildings were damaged or destroyed. One mobile home was blown off of its foundation. 8 people were injured.
F0	SE of Hartsburg	Logan	0023	0.1 miles (0.16 km)	Damage was limited to trees.
F0	N of Hindsboro (1st tornado)	Douglas	0042	0.2 miles (0.32 km)	A machine shed was destroyed.
F0	NW of Hindsboro (2nd tornado)	Douglas	0058	0.3 miles (0.5 km)	Caused damage to power poles and outbuildings.
F0	S of Newman	Douglas	0104	0.1 miles (0.16 km)	Brief touchdown in a field with no damage.
F0	N of Brocton	Edgar	0111	0.2 miles (0.32 km)	A shed was destroyed and utility poles were damaged.
F0	Chrisman area	Edgar	0115	0.2 miles (0.32 km)	A barn was damaged, and debris from the structure was thrown and smashed windows of homes and businesses.
F0	SE of Sidell	Vermilion	0120	0.1 miles (0.16 km)	Brief touchdown with no damage.
F0	NW of Metcalf	Edgar	0129	0.1 miles (0.16 km)	Brief touchdown with no damage.
F0	NE of Chrisman	Edgar	0149	0.2 miles (0.32 km)	One home, 2 barns, and a machine shed suffered roof damage.
Missouri
F1	SW of Wayland	Clark	2120	2.5 miles (4 km)	2 machine sheds and a barn were destroyed, and a mobile home was flipped over.
Iowa
F0	W of Fort Madison	Lee	2145	0.1 miles (0.16 km)	Brief touchdown with no damage.
F0	Fort Madison area	Lee	2200	0.1 miles (0.16 km)	Brief touchdown with no damage.
F0	N of New Boston	Lee	2202	0.1 miles (0.16 km)	One home sustained minor roof damage.
Indiana
F0	NW of Dana	Vermilion	0133	0.1 miles (0.16 km)	A pole barn was destroyed.
F1	W of North Union	Montgomery	0245	1.2 miles (1.9 km)	A garage and a pole barn were destroyed, while the roof of another barn was damaged.
F0	E of Willisville	Pike	0251	0.5 miles (0.8 km)	Brief touchdown in a field.
Source: Tornado History Project - April 7, 1998 Storm Data

=== April 8 event ===
F#	Location	County	Time (UTC)	Path length	Damage
Texas
F0	S of Driftwood	Hays	0940	0.5 miles (0.8 km)	
F0	NW of Buda	Hays	0957	1 miles (1.6 km)	
Louisiana
F1	NE of Haynesville	Claiborne	1243	0.2 miles (0.32 km)	Caused damage to carport roofs and patio covers.
Alabama
F1	S of Heath	Covington	1520	0.1 miles (0.16 km)	Tornado damaged a mobile home and the roof of a motel.
F3	S of Gordo to N of Northport	Pickens, Tuscaloosa	0001	19.5 miles (31.2 km)	Tornado was a precursor to the Birmingham F5. Traveled through rural areas north of the city of Tuscaloosa, with five homes and 11 mobile homes destroyed. 24 homes and 13 mobile homes were also damaged, and two people were injured.
F5	N of Kellerman to Birmingham	Tuscaloosa, Jefferson	0042	30.3 miles (48.5 km)	32 deaths – See article on this tornado
F1	E of Lakeview	DeKalb	0123	1.8 miles (2.9 km)	A few barns were destroyed.
F2	N of Pell City	St. Clair	0156	14.4 miles (23 km)	2 deaths - This tornado was spawned by the same supercell that produced the Birmingham F5. It remained over rural areas for 14 miles (23 km) and partially destroyed Bethel Baptist Church in Moody. 26 homes and mobile homes, along with other buildings were destroyed in the Coal City area. About 90 other homes and mobile homes suffered minor to major damage. The two fatalities occurred in a mobile home. Twelve additional people were injured. This storm later produced the Dunwoody tornado.
Arkansas
F0	Sunset	Crittenden	2320	0.5 miles (0.8 km)	Damage was limited to trees.
Tennessee
F0	S of Lawrenceburg	Lawrence	0000	0.5 miles (0.8 km)	Damage was limited to trees.
F1	Manchester area	Coffee	0100	1 miles (1.6 km)	Caused roof damage to several buildings in downtown Manchester.
Georgia
F1	N of Tallapoosa	Haralson	0330	3.5 miles (5.6 km)	One mobile home was destroyed while 36 homes, 7 businesses, and 2 churches were damaged
F2	Smyrna to NW of Buckhead	Cobb, Fulton	0420	3.5 miles (5.6 km)	The tornado began near the Georgia Memorial Park cemetery, and then blew the roof and upper floor off of a wood-frame strip mall, located on the west corner of Cobb Parkway (U.S. 41) and Windy Hill Road. As the tornado crossed this intersection, two Cobb police officers in their cars, who were traveling south on Cobb Parkway, were caught in the storm. The officer in front sped through the tornado to escape it, while the officer behind followed and turned his light bar on, activating the vehicle's dashcam. This video from inside the tornado was later shown on national television. A car dealership along the path sustained heavy damage, with over one half of a million dollars in damage to cars. The tornado continued across the intersection, seriously damaging a Haverty's furniture store, blowing over the canopy at a gas station, and blowing down a billboard. After crossing Interstate 75, it passed over the Interstate North complex, a major office park full of high-rise buildings on the north side of the Cumberland/Galleria edge city, which is home to The Weather Channel. Continuing into Fulton County at the Chattahoochee River, the tornado downed trees and power lines and caused minor structural damage. Four people were injured. The tornado lifted, while the rotating supercell traversed what is now the city of Sandy Springs and went on to produce the Dunwoody tornado.
F2	Dunwoody to N of Lawrenceville	DeKalb, Gwinnett	0435	19 miles (30.4 km)	1 death – See section on this tornado – Ten people were injured.
Source: Tornado History Project - April 8, 1998 Storm Data

=== April 9 event ===
F#	Location	County	Time (UTC)	Path length	Damage
Georgia
F3	NE of Pembroke to W of Coldbrook	Bryan, Effingham	0945	8 miles (12.8 km)	2 deaths - In Bryan County, 74 homes and other buildings were damaged with 14 of them destroyed, including six mobile homes, two frame houses, two brick homes and four other buildings. In Effingham County, 40 homes were damaged, with six mobile homes destroyed. 17 other people were injured.
F2	E of Donald to Richmond Hill	Long, Liberty, Bryan	1035	24.5 miles (39.2 km)	4 deaths - Ten mobile homes were destroyed in Rye Patch with two others damaged. In Fort Stewart, 55 buildings were damaged including 7 destroyed. 7 other people were injured.
South Carolina
F1	W of Hardeeville	Jasper	1022	1 miles (1.6 km)	Several buildings and homes were damaged.
Ohio
F0	NE of Copley	Summit	1745	0.3 miles (0.5 km)	Minor roof damage occurred.
F0	NW of North Eaton	Lorain	1745	0.1 miles (0.16 km)	Brief touchdown with no damage.
F0	SW of Windham	Portage	1830	0.1 miles (0.16 km)	Brief touchdown with no damage.
F0	Leavittsburg area	Trumbull	1928	0.1 miles (0.16 km)	Brief touchdown with no damage.
Pennsylvania
F1	NE of New Brighton	Beaver	1830	0.2 miles (0.32 km)	A cinder block warehouse was damaged.
Virginia
F0	Chesapeake area	Chesapeake	2000	5 miles (8 km)	Damage was limited to trees that fell on some homes.
Source: Tornado History Project - April 9, 1998 Storm Data

=== Oak Grove - Birmingham, Alabama ===
Oak Grove - Birmingham, Alabama
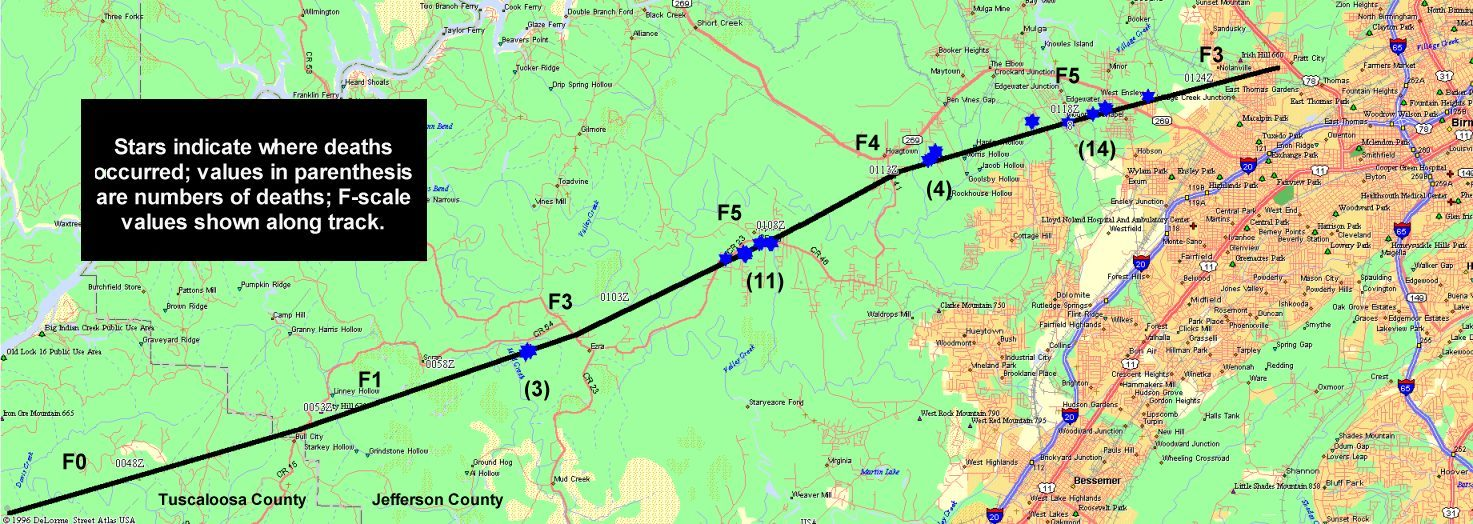
- Tornado track of the Jefferson County F5 tornado.

Meteorological history
- Date: April 8, 1998
- Formed: April 8, 1998, 7:42 p.m. CDT (UTC–05:00)
- Dissipated: April 8, 1998, 8:28 p.m. CDT (UTC–05:00)
- Duration: 46 minutes

F5 tornado
- on the Fujita scale
- Highest winds: >260 mph (420 km/h)

Overall effects
- Fatalities: 32
- Injuries: 259
- Damage: $202.83 million (1998 USD)

Shortly after 7:30 p.m. on April 8, the outbreak's deadliest tornado cut a 31-mile-long (50 km), 3/4-mile-wide (1.2 km) swath through multiple Birmingham suburbs, producing damage ranging from F3 to F5 and causing massive destruction before lifting in the western limits of the City of Birmingham, just northwest of the junctions of Interstates 20, 59 and 65. The worst of the destruction occurred across the cities of Oak Grove, Rock Creek, and McDonald Chapel. The second area affected by F5 damage was also devastated by a violent tornado in 1956 that tracked through the same areas hit by this storm. Debris from the tornado was scattered across central Alabama as far north as sections of Blount County, and extensive deforestation occurred along the majority of the path.

The tornado began in rural Tuscaloosa County, only causing F0 damage there. The tornado reached F1 intensity after it entered Jefferson County, and then rapidly intensified to an F3 as it crossed a stray outflow boundary, slamming into Oak Grove, an unincorporated town west of Rock Creek. Oak Grove was one of the hardest hit locations, with many structures destroyed in the area. Oak Grove High School sustained major structural damage, and the elementary school portion was destroyed. The school building was rebuilt two years later and reopened a mile away from the damaged area. No one inside the school was killed, but a group of cheerleaders practicing at the school's gymnasium escaped disaster with only minor injuries when a wall prevented a portion of the roof from falling on them. The tornado caused its first three fatalities in Oak Grove, which occurred when a mobile home completely disintegrated, throwing the occupants across the street; of the four occupants, only one survived. The Oak Grove fire station was severely damaged as well.

The tornado continued to intensify dramatically as it moved northeast across the outflow boundary, reaching F5 intensity as it struck Rock Creek. Many homes in the town were leveled or swept completely away, and the roof of Rock Creek Church of God's Family Life Center was blown off. Many church attendees were sheltering in the restroom when the building was destroyed; all were safe. Several cars in the church parking lot were thrown into a 50-foot deep ravine. The church was turned into a makeshift trauma center immediately after the tornado. A total of eleven people were killed in Rock Creek. The far western fringes of Concord were impacted in this area as well (particularly the Warrior River Road area). The tornado weakened slightly to F4 intensity as it struck the neighboring community of Sylvan Springs, where many additional homes were completely leveled, and four people were killed. Homes were damaged and destroyed just outside Pleasant Grove as well.

Outbreak death toll
State	Total	County	County total
Alabama	34	Jefferson	32
Alabama	34	St. Clair	2
Georgia	7	Bryan	2
Georgia	7	De Kalb	1
Georgia	7	Liberty	1
Georgia	7	Long	3
Totals	41		
All deaths were tornado-related

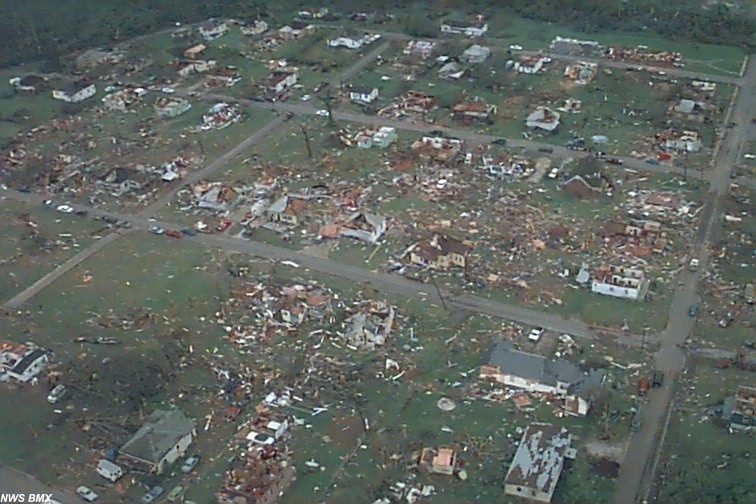
Tornado damage in Edgewater, Alabama (courtesy of NWS Birmingham, Alabama)

Continuing past Pleasant Grove, the tornado began to encroach on Birmingham's inner suburbs. This tornado regained its maximum F5 strength as it tore through the communities of Edgewater and McDonald Chapel. Fourteen people lost their lives there and the storm swept away numerous homes. The tornado's effects were noticed around the same time by the ABC 33/40 Birmingham tower camera, which was pointed toward the western suburbs. Even though it was dark, a massive power failure occurred in western Birmingham, when several transmission lines coming from the Miller Steam Plant electric generating station were knocked off line. This was noticed during the long-form weather coverage on ABC 33/40, which lasted most of the evening; the station, and several of its competitors, has a policy of pre-empting regular programming and broadcasting only severe weather information when a tornado warning is in effect for any part of its coverage area. The storm began to separate from the outflow boundary and began to weaken somewhat as it crossed Alabama State Route 269 into the northern Birmingham neighborhood of Pratt City, though it was still very powerful. F3 damage and several injuries occurred in Pratt City before the tornado abruptly dissipated. Had the tornado remained on the ground, it would have gone into the northern sections of downtown Birmingham. A few miles further to the east, the Birmingham International Airport could have been affected as well. The storm lifted before reaching these sections of Birmingham. However, a new F2 tornado touched down again in neighboring St. Clair County, where two people were killed.

The tornado was at the time the seventh deadliest in Alabama history, killing one more person than in a tornado that hit Alabama on March 21, 1932; a young boy died nine days after this event from head injuries. His father was paralyzed from the waist down, and his mother suffered severe injuries. Another mother and her two children, despite taking shelter in their underground basement, were killed when hundreds of pounds of debris was blown onto them. Overall, 32 people were killed by the tornado and hundreds more were injured.

=== Dunwoody, Georgia ===
Dunwoody, Georgia
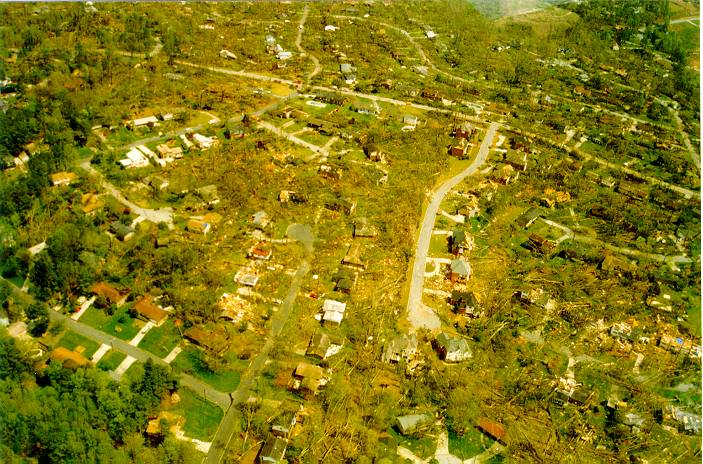
- Tornado damage in Dunwoody, Georgia

Meteorological history
- Date: April 9, 1998

F2 tornado
- on the Fujita scale
- Highest winds: 150 mph (240 km/h)

Overall effects
- Fatalities: 1
- Injuries: 10
- Damage: $75 million (NCDC)
- Areas affected: Metro Atlanta

After producing three F2+ tornadoes in Alabama, the Birmingham supercell moved into Georgia, producing another F2 in Cobb County. After that tornado lifted, this tornado, also rated F2, touched down at 12:25 a.m. on April 9, just north of Perimeter Center in DeKalb County. After sparing the many high-rises there, the tornado rapidly intensified to high-end F2 strength with 150 mph (240 km/h) winds, and grew to one-half-mile (0.80 km) wide. It damaged thousands of homes and downed tens of thousands of native pine and hardwood forest trees. More than 3,000 homes were damaged, 200 seriously damaged and 70 were destroyed (or nearly so) condemned, having to be completely rebuilt. The campus of DeKalb College (now Perimeter College at Georgia State University) sustained major damage, with over 80% of its trees downed and windows blown out of its buildings. One person was killed when a tree fell on his home.

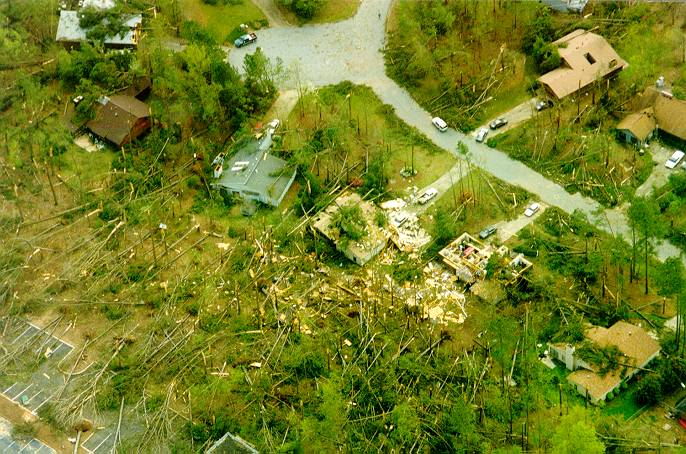
Severe damage in a neighborhood in Dunwoody

The storm continued into Gwinnett County, somewhat weakened, but still causing extensive damage in Peachtree Corners. The tornado crossed the county line one mile (1.6 km) west of Norcross, traveling parallel to Old Norcross Road at F2 status. It continued to Duluth, taking shingles off the roofs of houses in downtown. Many more trees were snapped along Old Peachtree Road near Interstate 85. The tornado finally weakened and lifted five miles (8.0 km) north of Lawrenceville, having affected over 5,000 homes along its path and injured ten people in Gwinnett County. The total length of the tornado's path was 19 miles (31 km). The current Norcross High School sits on land deforested by the tornado, and then purchased by the Gwinnett school board. In 2007, the county began seeking a grant from GEMA to help it reinstate a system of tornado sirens, beginning with 11 to be installed along the path of the 1998 tornado.

== See also ==
- List of tornadoes and tornado outbreaks
  - List of North American tornadoes and tornado outbreaks
- Tornado outbreak of April 1977
