= Malik Jackson (linebacker) =

American gridiron football player (born 1985)

Profile
- Position: Linebacker

Personal information
- Born: June 10, 1985 (age 41); Brooklyn, New York, U.S.
- Listed height: 6 ft 2 in (1.88 m)
- Listed weight: 230 lb (104 kg)

Career information
- High school: Dunwoody (GA)
- College: Louisville
- NFL draft: 2008: undrafted

Career history
- Oakland Raiders (2008)*; Albany Firebirds (2009); Calgary Stampeders (2009–2013); Ottawa Redblacks (2014–2016)
- * Offseason or practice squad member only

Awards and highlights
- Second-team All-Big East (2006)
- Stats at CFL.ca (archive)

Malik Jackson (born June 10, 1985) is a former professional American and Canadian football linebacker. He was signed by the Oakland Raiders as an undrafted free agent in 2008. He played college football for the Louisville Cardinals.

Jackson was a member of the Oakland Raiders, Albany Firebirds, Calgary Stampeders and Ottawa Redblacks.

== Early life ==
Jackson was born on June 10, 1985, in Brooklyn, New York. He attended Dunwoody High School in Georgia for four years. During his senior season, he totaled 93 tackles, two tackles for losses and four forced fumbles. During high school Jackson played at defensive back.

== College career ==
Jackson played for the Louisville Cardinals for his collegiate career.

As a freshman in 2004 he appeared in 11 games mostly on special teams and recorded eight tackles. Against Army he recorded a career-high three tackles and added two against Cincinnati.

During his sophomore season in 2005, Jackson played in all 12 games and had career high 30 tackles. Jackson made four tackles in his first collegiate start against North Carolina. He added seven tackles which became his career high against Oregon State and then two against Kentucky.

In 2006, as a junior he played in all of the Cardinals' 13 games which included the Orange Bowl. He ranked third on the team with 57 tackles and second in the Big East in sacks and tackles for a loss. Jackson led Louisville in sacks with nine and tackles for a loss with 16. In the Orange Bowl, he had four tackles and two for a loss, also recording a sack and a fumble recovery. The fumble recovery came with 1:55 left in the second half and was considered controversial as to whether Kenneth Moore of Wake Forest's knee had hit the ground. His fumble recovery was also the first of his Louisville career. After the season, he was named to the second-team All-Big East team.

== Professional career ==
=== Oakland Raiders ===
Jackson signed as an undrafted free agent with the Oakland Raiders on April 28, 2008. He was released on August 12. During his stint with the Raiders he was listed as a linebacker.

=== Albany Firebirds ===
Jackson signed with the Albany Firebirds in 2009. On May 9, Jackson debuted with Albany and recorded a team high three pass breakups and four tackles. While with Albany, Jackson played both defensive back and linebacker.

=== Calgary Stampeders ===
Jackson signed with the Calgary Stampeders on May 13, 2009, as a linebacker. He was released on July 8, but re-signed the next day to Calgary's practice roster. In his first appearance of the 2009 Calgary Stampeders season, Jackson recorded one special teams tackle. In a 44–9 victory over the Toronto Argonauts in Week 3, Jackson was runner-up for the league's defensive player of the week award (behind teammate Dwaine Carpenter) after recording six tackles, two sacks and a forced fumble. Malik Jackson spent 5 seasons (2009 through 2013) with the Stampeders, totalling 214 tackles, 26 special teams tackles, 11 sacks, 2 interceptions, 7 fumble recoveries and 2 defensive touchdowns. Jackson suffered a broken arm in the 2013 CFL season, which caused him to only play in 2 games that season. In the off-season Jackson was not re-signed by the Stampedes and became a free agent on February 11, 2014.

=== Ottawa Redblacks ===
On February 12, 2014, Jackson signed with the Ottawa Redblacks of the Canadian Football League.
