= Brook Run Skate Park =

American park in Dunwoody, GA

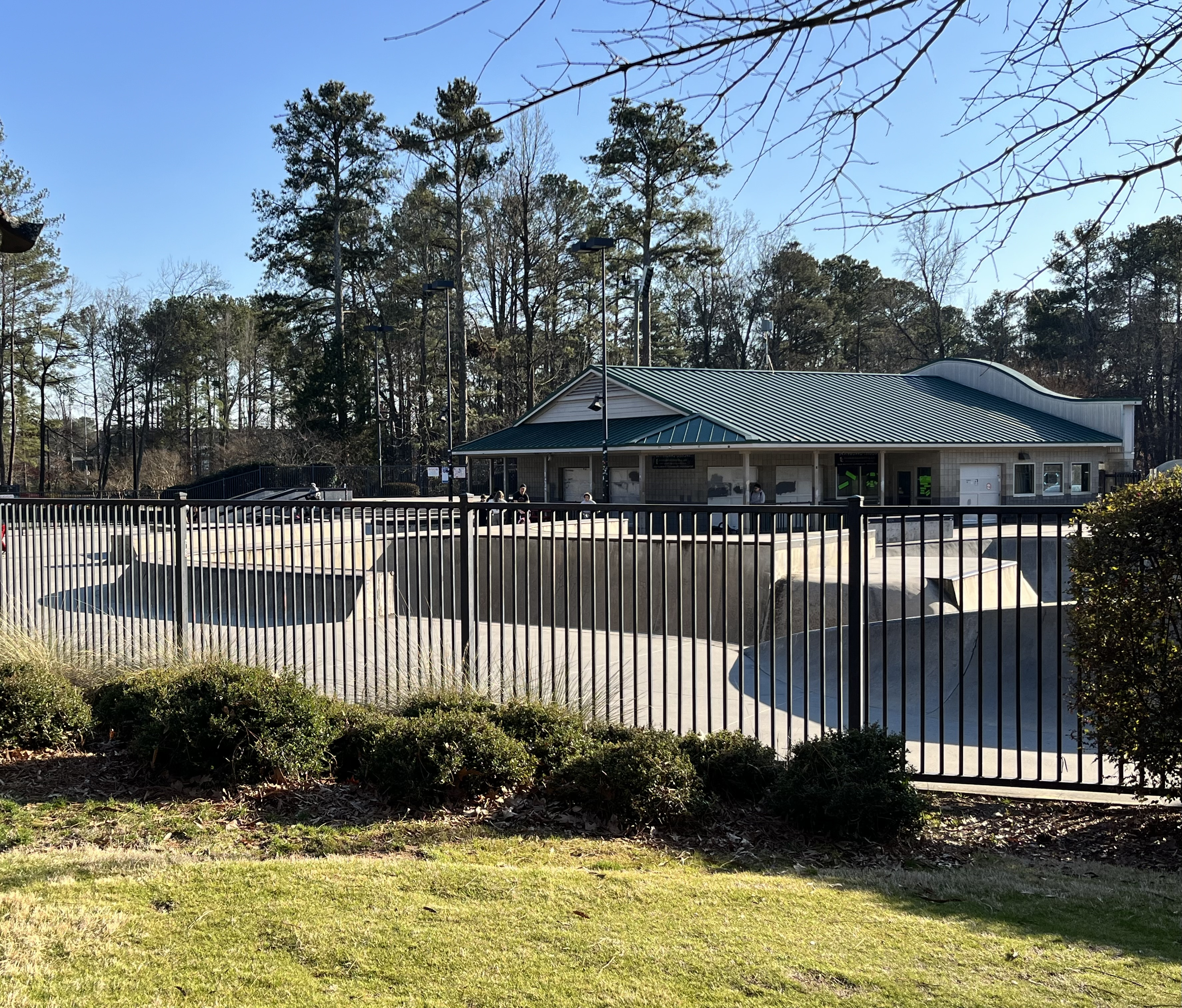
Brook Run Skate Park

Brook Run Skate Park is a 27,000-square-foot (2,500 m^{2}) lighted skate park located in Dunwoody, GA that opened on July 28, 2007. SkateBoardPark.com described the park as, "the newest and best outdoor skatepark in Atlanta."

When the skate park was being built it caused some controversy in its neighborhood because of decreased trees and increased lighting and noise.

Dekalb County originally owned and operated the park. However, the newly incorporated City of Dunwoody took ownership of the skatepark and the surrounding park/recreation area on July 29, 2010. The City of Dunwoody dropped the admission fee in May 2011 and the park is now free. Access to the park was improved with the addition of a magnetic gate that allows access as early as 7am. Brook Run Skatepark has a concession stand and hangout lounge, The Layback Grind Café. The Café is run by Rob Hart and Ross Lanning, and is usually open by 3pm on weekdays and 12 pm on weekends.
