= Corey White (American football) =

American football player (born 1990)

No. 23, 24, 27, 30
- Position: Cornerback

Personal information
- Born: May 9, 1990 (age 36); Dunwoody, Georgia, U.S.
- Listed height: 5 ft 11 in (1.80 m)
- Listed weight: 206 lb (93 kg)

Career information
- High school: Dunwoody
- College: Samford
- NFL draft: 2012: 5th round, 162nd overall pick

Career history
- New Orleans Saints (2012–2014); Dallas Cowboys (2015); Arizona Cardinals (2015); Buffalo Bills (2016); New York Jets (2017)*; Indianapolis Colts (2017)*; Cleveland Browns (2018)*
- * Offseason or practice squad member only

Career NFL statistics
- Total tackles: 161
- Sacks: 1.0
- Forced fumbles: 2
- Fumble recoveries: 2
- Interceptions: 6
- Stats at Pro Football Reference

Corey White (born May 9, 1990) is an American former professional football player who was a cornerback in the National Football League (NFL). He played college football for the Samford Bulldogs and was selected by the New Orleans Saints in the fifth round of the 2012 NFL draft.

== Early life ==
White was born in Dunwoody, Georgia and attended Dunwoody High School, before accepting a scholarship to play college football at Samford University.

As a senior with the Bulldogs, he caught the attention from professional scouts with his strong performances in Samford's occasional games against major college opponents and at the NFL Scouting Combine.

== Professional career ==
Pre-draft measurables
Height	Weight	Arm length	Hand span	40-yard dash	10-yard split	20-yard split	20-yard shuttle	Three-cone drill	Vertical jump	Broad jump	Bench press
5 ft 11 1/2 in (1.82 m)	206 lb (93 kg)	31 5/8 in (0.80 m)	9 3/8 in (0.24 m)	4.39 s	1.60 s	2.39 s	4.20 s	6.72 s	38.5 in (0.98 m)	10 ft 6 in (3.20 m)	15 reps
All values from NFL Combine/Pro Day

=== New Orleans Saints ===
White was selected by the New Orleans Saints in the fifth round (162nd) of the 2012 NFL draft. White became the highest selection in Samford's school history until Jaquiski Tartt was selected in the second round (46th overall) in the 2015 NFL draft. On July 2, he signed a four-year contract.

He was active in 10 games and started 4 of them in his rookie season, as he registered 31 tackles with 1 interception. The next year, he played in all of the games and started 6 due to injuries in the secondary, playing poorly at cornerback, while recording 41 tackles, 1 interception and 1 forced fumble.

In December 2014, White was moved from cornerback to free safety after Jairus Byrd and Rafael Bush were placed on the injured reserve list. He ended the season with 53 tackles, 2 interceptions and a forced fumble. On March 13, 2015, he was waived after starting 19 out of 41 games.

=== Dallas Cowboys ===
White was claimed by the Dallas Cowboys on March 14, 2015. He showed promise in preseason playing at safety and nickel corner. In the fifth game of the season against the New England Patriots, he passed Tyler Patmon and took over the team's nickel corner role, until the eighth game of the season against the Philadelphia Eagles, when he was declared inactive and replaced by Patmon. On November 17, he was released to make room for cornerback Deji Olatoye.

=== Arizona Cardinals ===
The Arizona Cardinals signed White on December 2, 2015. He played three games, not recording a tackle, and was declared inactive for the final two regular season contests.

=== Buffalo Bills ===
On April 4, 2016 White signed with the Buffalo Bills.

=== New York Jets ===
On May 25, 2017, White signed with the New York Jets. On August 4, 2017, White was placed on injured reserve. He was released with an injury settlement on August 10, 2017.

=== Indianapolis Colts ===
On August 21, 2017, White signed with the Indianapolis Colts. He was released on September 2, 2017.

=== Cleveland Browns ===
On January 11, 2018, White signed a reserve/future contract with the Cleveland Browns. He was released by the Browns on April 20, 2018.

== NFL career statistics ==
Legend
**Bold**	Career high

=== Regular season ===
Year	Team	Games		Tackles					Interceptions					Fumbles			
Year	Team	GP	GS	Cmb	Solo	Ast	Sck	TFL	Int	Yds	TD	Lng	PD	FF	FR	Yds	TD
2012	NOR	10	4	31	25	6	0.0	**1**	1	0	0	0	3	0	0	0	0
2013	NOR	**16**	6	41	29	**12**	0.0	**1**	1	**43**	0	**43**	**6**	**1**	**1**	0	0
2014	NOR	15	**9**	**53**	**50**	3	**1.0**	**1**	**2**	2	0	2	**6**	**1**	**1**	0	0
2015	DAL	7	1	6	6	0	0.0	**1**	0	0	0	0	3	0	0	0	0
2015	ARI	3	0	0	0	0	0.0	0	0	0	0	0	0	0	0	0	0
2016	BUF	15	4	30	22	8	0.0	0	**2**	0	0	0	4	0	0	0	0
		66	24	161	132	29	1.0	4	6	45	0	43	22	2	2	0	0

=== Playoffs ===
Year	Team	Games		Tackles					Interceptions					Fumbles			
Year	Team	GP	GS	Cmb	Solo	Ast	Sck	TFL	Int	Yds	TD	Lng	PD	FF	FR	Yds	TD
2013	NOR	**2**	**2**	**8**	**7**	**1**	0.0	**1**	0	0	0	0	0	0	0	0	0
		2	2	8	7	1	0.0	1	0	0	0	0	0	0	0	0	0
