= Dunwoody High School =

Public high school in Dunwoody, Georgia, United States

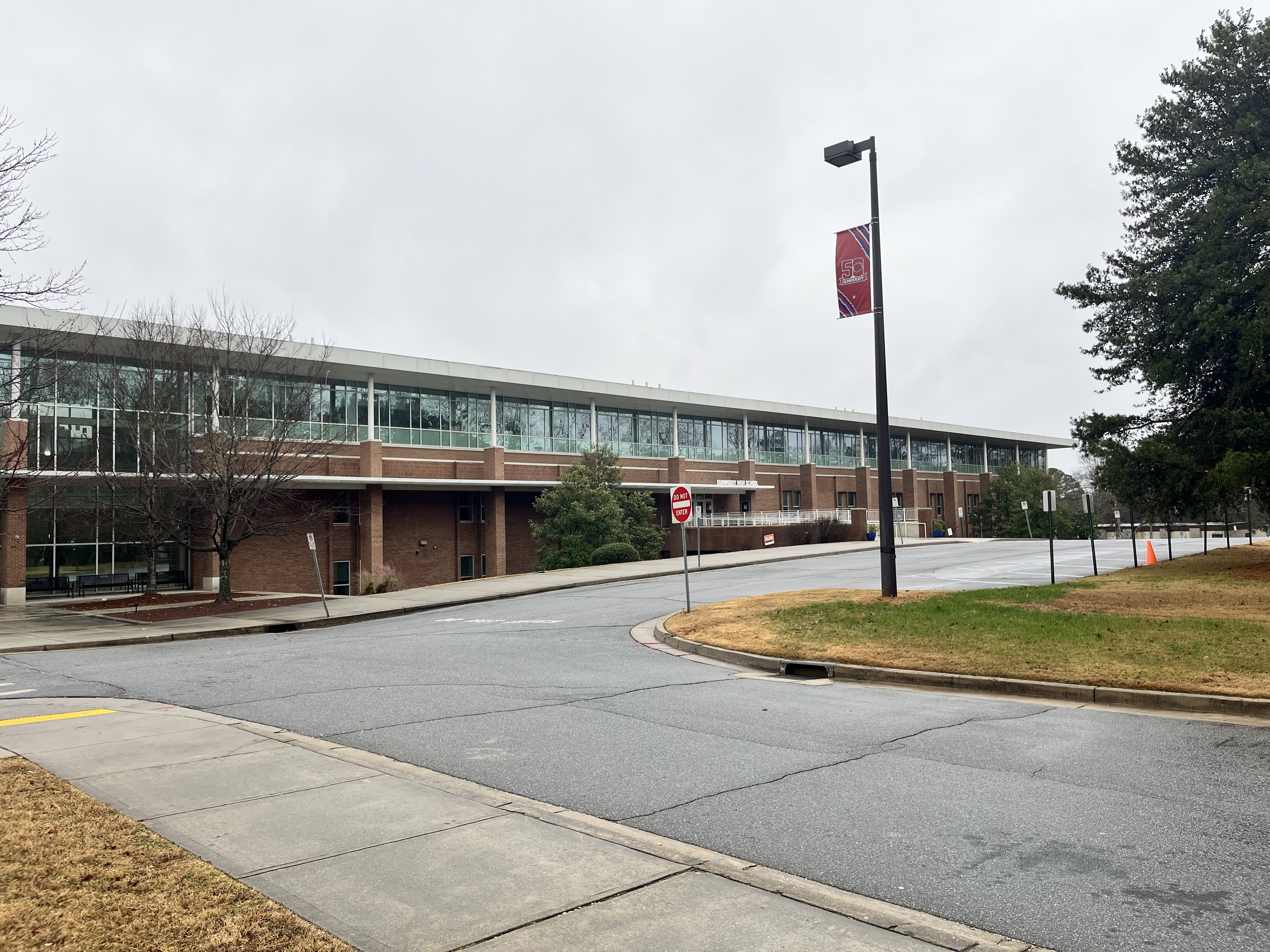

Location
- 5035 Vermack Road; Dunwoody, Georgia; United States; 33°56′44″N 84°18′56″W

Information
- Type: Public
- Motto: Personal Responsibility in Developing Excellence (PRIDE)
- Established: 1971
- Principal: Tom Bass
- Teaching staff: 120.00 (FTE)
- Grades: 9–12
- Enrollment: 1,974 (2023–2024)
- Student to teacher ratio: 16.45
- Campus: Suburban
- Colors: Red, navy, and white
- Mascot: Wildcats
- Rival: Chamblee High School
- Feeder schools: Peachtree Charter Middle School
- Website: dunwoodyhs.dekalb.k12.ga.us

Dunwoody High School is a public high school in Dunwoody, an incorporated city in DeKalb County, Georgia, United States.

Dunwoody enrolls students in grades 9-12, and is operated by the DeKalb County School System. It follows a four by four block schedule, in which students attend four classes every day for 90 minutes.

In 1988, Dunwoody merged with another local high school, Peachtree High School. Peachtree became a middle school and Dunwoody remained the high school. Dunwoody's previous colors were crimson and gold, and their mascot was the Wildcat. Peachtree's colors were red, white, and blue, and their mascot was the Patriot. As part of a compromise between the two schools during the merger, Dunwoody agreed to change its colors to red, white, and blue, while keeping its wildcat mascot. Prior to the merger, Dunwoody High School had an eighth grade, which is now part of Peachtree Middle School.

== Feeder schools ==
The following elementary schools feed into Dunwoody:

- Dunwoody Elementary School
- Hightower Elementary School
- Kingsley Charter Elementary School
- Austin Elementary School
- Vanderlyn Elementary School
- Chesnut Elementary School

Peachtree Charter Middle School is Dunwoody's feeder middle school.

== Career academies ==
Dunwoody High School offers two career academies through the National Academy Foundation program. The academies provide a combination of school-based curricula and work-based experiences, which include paid internships.

The Academy of Finance is a two-year program in which students gain specialized preparation in the field of finance while completing their normal course curriculum. Over the course of the program, students are introduced to four segments of business: Entrepreneurship, Marketing, International Business, and Personal Finance. Students practice real-world activities while preparing marketing plans for products and competing in financial competitions. Business partners from the community visit the class and work with the students. Each year, the academy students visit the New York Mercantile Exchange, the Stock Exchange, and an investment bank to experience how the world's financial centers operate.

The Academy of Mass Communications is a two-year program which offers an educational foundation aimed at a future in the communications industry. The program introduces the students to all facets of the journalism industry (broadcast, print, and speech). Students receive hands-on training in video production with the use of fifteen Final Cut Pro editing systems, work on interview techniques and newspaper layout, and produce a daily news program shown over the closed circuit television system. Each year, the academy students visit NBC in New York to see first-hand how one of the world’s largest broadcasting companies operates. The school gained a new newsroom studio and Apple Mac lab in the spring of 2011.

== Achievements ==
=== Debate ===
The team of Robert Galerstein and Hayley Hopkins received vast national recognition in the 2011-2012 season. Awards included championships at the Wake Forest and Chattahoochee tournaments and finalists at the Emory Barkley Forum. Galerstein and Hopkins reached the finals of the Georgia Varsity State Championship in 2012, making them the most competitively successful team at the high school.

In 2010–2011, the first varsity debate team from Dunwoody (Robert Galerstein and Eilidh Geddes) reached the elimination rounds of the varsity state tournament and qualified for the Tournament of Champions.

=== Quiz Bowl ===
The Dunwoody High School Quiz Bowl team has appeared various times on the television show High-Q, broadcast on WSB-TV.

In 2013, the Quiz Bowl team participated in the National Academic Quiz Team Championships, hosted in Atlanta.

In 2014 and 2015, the Quiz Bowl team attended the National Academic Quiz Team Championships in Chicago.

=== Yearbook ===
The Dunwoody High School yearbook, Chrysalis, received a rating of Superior in GSPA for 2008-2009 yearbooks and was ranked number one in the state.

=== Fine arts ===
The DHS bands have received Superior ratings at the Dekalb County Marching Exhibition and GMEA Concert Band Festivals.

The DHS orchestra performs every spring at the Georgia Music Educators Association Festival, and every year receives the highest marks. In 2014 the orchestra received a Superior, the highest possible rating, from all judges. Also in 2014, the Dunwoody High School orchestra traveled to Austria for a week-long performance tour.

=== In film ===
Dunwoody High School was used as a filming location for the 2012 sports drama Trouble with the Curve. For the filming, the dugouts were temporarily repainted from the school colors of red, white, and blue, to gold and black.

=== Athletics ===
The Girls Track Team has won the GHSA State Championships 3 times [2003, 2013 and 2019]. Dunwoody presently houses the Georgia Girls All-Classification State Meet Record in the Shot Put [47'11"]. This record was set by Janae Profit ['21] in her senior year. That year, she went on to win The Gatorade Player of the Year Award for Girls Track. This was the first time that the award was given to a thrower.

In 2008, Dunwoody's football team won a region championship over St. Pius. Dunwoody beat St. Pius 20-14 in this championship, the first region championship since 1993.

Girls' cross country won both the state and region championship in 2012 and again in 2014.

Boys' hockey team were state finalists in 2009.

=== State Championships ===
Type	Competition	State Titles	Season(s)	Sources/Notes
Girls Sports	Cross Country	5	2011, 2012, 2013, 2014, 2015	1st: 2012, 2014, 2015 3rd: 2011, 2013
Girls Sports	Softball		1994, 1996	
Girls Sports	Swimming	6	1975, 1976, 1983, 1985, 1986, 1987	
Girls Sports	Tennis	2	1980, 1981	
Girls Sports	Track	3	2003, 2013, 2019	
Boys Sports	Baseball	1	2007	
Boys Sports	Basketball	3	1995, 2005, 2006	
Boys Sports	Cross Country	1	1974	
Boys Sports	Football	1	1993	
Boys Sports	Swimming	4	1976, 1977, 1978, 1984	
Boys Sports	Tennis	4	1983, 1985, 1988, 1989	Coach: Celeste Boemker; individual champions: Drew Kirkley (1988) and Scott Cotton (1988–1989)
Boys Sports	Track	2	2009, 2011	James Dwyer - 1 mile (2011), runner-up 2 mile (2011) Kuaniyal Chol - 800m (2009), 800m runner-up (2010)
Boys Sports	Wrestling	1	2017	Constantine Gavalas went undefeated as a senior and won the individual state championship for the 6A bracket

The most notable athletic achievement in football was when the team went 15-0 and won the state championship in 1993 under head coach David Kelly. The newest win in Dunwoody's belt came from the Dunwoody jr wildcats 6th grade team in 2020. The Wildcats finished the season ranked #4 in the nation. Following this season Kelly left Dunwoody to be an assistant coach at the University of Georgia. After a long college coaching career including stops at Georgia Tech, Stanford and LSU, Kelly resigned from his job at the University of Central Florida because of allegations of NCAA recruiting violations. He is now an assistant coach with the Edmonton Eskimos of the CFL.

The most notable athletic achievement in baseball was when the team went 34-4 and swept powerhouse Columbus High School on June 1, 2007. This was the DeKalb County's first championship in baseball since defunct Henderson Mill High won in 1974. Final national baseball polls ranked the wildcats as high as #18 in the nation.

The most notable athletic achievement in boys' basketball was a perfect 30-0 season and state championship in 1995. The basketball team narrowly missed another shot at a perfect season and state title in 2004, losing their only game of the season at the Final Four and finishing 29-1. That team went on to win the And 1 High School national championship in June 2004 and back to back state titles in 2005 and 2006. Two players from those teams played major Division 1 basketball, An'Juan Wilderness, UNC-Charlotte and Zac Swansey, University of Georgia and Tennessee Tech. Four players from the 2007-2008 team that reached the Final Four played major Division 1 basketball, Pierre Jordan, Florida State and Georgia Tech, Delwan Graham, LSU and Jacksonville, Javon McKay, Tennessee Tech and Chris Singleton, a McDonald's All-American, Florida State. The Washington Wizards selected Singleton with the 18th pick in the 2011 NBA draft.

== Notable alumni ==
- Jeff Abbott, former major league baseball player
- Cooper Andrews, actor
- Jeff Arnold, founder of WebMD and Sharecare.
- Vivian Bang, actress
- Harris Barton, former NFL football player
- Idrees Bashir, former NFL football player
- Black Lips, Garage Rock Band
- Byron Bowers, Producer, Comedian, Actor
- Carlton Bruner, Olympic swimmer
- Alex Caskey, Major League Soccer player
- The Brothers Chaps, Michael and Matthew Chapman, creators of Homestar Runner
- Doug Gjertsen, Olympic swimmer
- Orantes Grant, former NFL football player
- Matthew Grocoff, environmentalist, speaker, clean energy and water advocate. [Grocoff was a graduate of Peachtree High School which later merged with Dunwoody High School].
- James Husband (Jamey Huggins), musician who performed with the band Of Montreal, as well as solo; "named" Homestar Runner
- Dexter Jackson, NFL football player
- Malik Jackson, CFL player for the Calgary Stampeders
- Kip Pardue, actor
- Ryan Seacrest, TV host and producer
- Chris Singleton, forward for the Washington Wizards
- Corey White, NFL player, cornerback for the New Orleans Saints
- Jeff Williams, poker player
- Sally Yates, former US Deputy Attorney General, Class of 1978
