= Sylvan Springs, Alabama =

- Town
- Location of Sylvan Springs in Jefferson County, Alabama.
- Coordinates: 33°30′49″N 87°01′42″W
- Country: United States
- State: Alabama
- County: Jefferson

Area
  - Total: 9.29 sq mi (24.05 km^{2})
  - Land: 9.29 sq mi (24.05 km^{2})
  - Water: 0 sq mi (0.00 km^{2})
- Elevation: 623 ft (190 m)

Population (2020)
  - Total: 1,653
  - Density: 178.0/sq mi (68.73/km^{2})
- Time zone: UTC-6 (Central (CST))
  - Summer (DST): UTC-5 (CDT)
- ZIP code: 35118
- Area codes: 205 & 659
- FIPS code: 01-74424
- GNIS feature ID: 2406706
- Website: www.sylvanspringsal.com

Sylvan Springs is a town in Jefferson County, Alabama, United States, located northwest of the Birmingham suburb of Pleasant Grove. It incorporated on May 22, 1957. As of the 2020 census, Sylvan Springs had a population of 1,653. This area was damaged by an F5 tornado on April 8, 1998, including the First United Methodist Church of Sylvan Springs.

== Geography ==
According to the U.S. Census Bureau, the town has a total area of 3.5 square miles (9.1 km^{2}), all land.

== Demographics ==
Historical population
Census	Pop.	Note	%±
1960	245		—
1970	344		40.4%
1980	450		30.8%
1990	1,470		226.7%
2000	1,465		−0.3%
2010	1,542		5.3%
2020	1,653		7.2%
U.S. Decennial Census; 2013 Estimate

=== Racial and ethnic composition ===
Sylvan Springs town, Alabama – Racial and ethnic composition Note: the US Census treats Hispanic/Latino as an ethnic category. This table excludes Latinos from the racial categories and assigns them to a separate category. Hispanics/Latinos may be of any race.
Race / Ethnicity (NH = Non-Hispanic)	Pop 2000	Pop 2010	Pop 2020	% 2000	% 2010	% 2020
White alone (NH)	1,439	1,494	1,470	98.23%	96.89%	88.93%
Black or African American alone (NH)	10	21	49	0.68%	1.36%	2.96%
Native American or Alaska Native alone (NH)	5	8	8	0.34%	0.52%	0.48%
Asian alone (NH)	1	0	0	0.07%	0.00%	0.00%
Native Hawaiian or Pacific Islander alone (NH)	0	0	0	0.00%	0.00%	0.00%
Other race alone (NH)	0	0	1	0.00%	0.00%	0.06%
Mixed race or Multiracial (NH)	3	11	95	0.20%	0.71%	5.75%
Hispanic or Latino (any race)	7	8	30	0.48%	0.52%	1.81%
Total	1,465	1,542	1,653	100.00%	100.00%	100.00%

=== 2020 census ===
As of the 2020 census, Sylvan Springs had a population of 1,653. There were 666 households, including 515 family households, in the town.

The median age was 47.0 years. 19.7% of residents were under the age of 18 and 24.0% were 65 years of age or older. For every 100 females there were 90.9 males, and for every 100 females age 18 and over there were 90.5 males.

0.0% of residents lived in urban areas, while 100.0% lived in rural areas.

Of the 666 households, 29.3% had children under the age of 18 living in them. Of all households, 56.8% were married-couple households, 14.1% were households with a male householder and no spouse or partner present, and 25.7% were households with a female householder and no spouse or partner present. About 23.0% of households were made up of individuals, and 13.2% had someone living alone who was 65 years of age or older.

There were 697 housing units, of which 4.4% were vacant. The homeowner vacancy rate was 1.2% and the rental vacancy rate was 5.7%.

=== 2010 census ===
At the 2010 census, there were 1,542 people, 611 households, and 463 families living in the town. The population density was 440.6 inhabitants per square mile (170.1/km^{2}). There were 650 housing units at an average density of 185.7 per square mile (71.7/km^{2}). The racial makeup of the town was 97.3% White, 1.4% Black or African American, 0.5% Native American, 0.0% Asian, and 0.7% from two or more races. 0.5% of the population were Hispanic or Latino of any race.

Of the 611 households 22.3% had children under the age of 18 living with them, 62.0% were married couples living together, 10.0% had a female householder with no husband present, and 24.2% were non-families. 21.6% of households were one person and 12.6% were one person aged 65 or older. The average household size was 2.52 and the average family size was 2.92.

The age distribution was 20.4% under the age of 18, 6.0% from 18 to 24, 23.5% from 25 to 44, 30.5% from 45 to 64, and 19.7% 65 or older. The median age was 45.2 years. For every 100 females, there were 87.6 males. For every 100 females age 18 and over, there were 96.6 males.

The median household income was $60,938 and the median family income was $71,944. Males had a median income of $56,250 versus $37,692 for females. The per capita income for the town was $25,653. About 5.4% of families and 7.5% of the population were below the poverty line, including 12.0% of those under age 18 and 6.0% of those age 65 or over.

=== 2000 census ===
At the 2000 census, there were 1,465 people, 589 households, and 461 families living in the town. The population density was 420.3 inhabitants per square mile (162.3/km^{2}). There were 610 housing units at an average density of 175.0 per square mile (67.6/km^{2}). The racial makeup of the town was 98.63% White, 0.68% Black or African American, 0.34% Native American, 0.07% Asian, and 0.27% from two or more races. 0.48% of the population were Hispanic or Latino of any race.

Of the 589 households 26.1% had children under the age of 18 living with them, 68.6% were married couples living together, 7.3% had a female householder with no husband present, and 21.7% were non-families. 19.9% of households were one person and 10.7% were one person aged 65 or older. The average household size was 2.49 and the average family size was 2.85.

The age distribution was 18.0% under the age of 18, 8.7% from 18 to 24, 26.6% from 25 to 44, 28.6% from 45 to 64, and 18.2% 65 or older. The median age was 44 years. For every 100 females, there were 93.5 males. For every 100 females age 18 and over, there were 89.1 males.

The median household income was $42,692 and the median family income was $49,853. Males had a median income of $37,500 versus $23,350 for females. The per capita income for the town was $20,338. About 3.9% of families and 4.7% of the population were below the poverty line, including 5.0% of those under age 18 and 7.8% of those age 65 or over.
