= Rock Creek, Alabama =

- CDP
- Location in Jefferson County and the state of Alabama
- Coordinates: 33°28′38″N 87°04′53″W
- Country: United States
- State: Alabama
- County: Jefferson

Area
  - Total: 3.02 sq mi (7.81 km^{2})
  - Land: 3.02 sq mi (7.81 km^{2})
  - Water: 0 sq mi (0.00 km^{2})
- Elevation: 558 ft (170 m)

Population (2020)
  - Total: 1,471
  - Density: 487.7/sq mi (188.32/km^{2})
- Time zone: UTC-6 (Central (CST))
  - Summer (DST): UTC-5 (CDT)
- ZIP code: 35023
- Area codes: 205 and 659
- FIPS code: 01-65412
- GNIS feature ID: 2403485

Rock Creek is a census-designated place in Jefferson County, Alabama, United States. Its location is northwest of Hueytown. At the 2020 census, the population was 1,471. This area was damaged by an F5 tornado on April 8, 1998. An EF2 tornado struck northwest from here on January 23, 2012.

== Geography ==
According to the U.S. Census Bureau, the CDP has a total area of 3.0 square miles (7.8 km^{2}), all land.

== Demographics ==
Historical population
Census	Pop.	Note	%±
2000	1,495		—
2010	1,456		−2.6%
2020	1,471		1.0%
U.S. Decennial Census; 1850 1860 1870; 1880 1890-1900; 1910 1920 1930; 1940 1950 1960; 1970 1980 1990; 2000 2010 2020

Rock Creek was first listed as a census designated place in the 2000 U.S. census.

=== Racial and ethnic composition ===
Rock Creek CDP, Alabama – Racial and ethnic composition Note: the US Census treats Hispanic/Latino as an ethnic category. This table excludes Latinos from the racial categories and assigns them to a separate category. Hispanics/Latinos may be of any race.
Race / Ethnicity (NH = Non-Hispanic)	Pop 2000	Pop 2010	Pop 2020	% 2000	% 2010	% 2020
White alone (NH)	1,470	1,419	1,350	98.33%	97.46%	91.77%
Black or African American alone (NH)	4	12	31	0.27%	0.82%	2.11%
Native American or Alaska Native alone (NH)	6	10	0	0.40%	0.69%	0.00%
Asian alone (NH)	1	1	0	0.07%	0.07%	0.00%
Native Hawaiian or Pacific Islander alone (NH)	0	3	2	0.00%	0.21%	0.14%
Other race alone (NH)	2	0	10	0.13%	0.00%	0.68%
Mixed race or Multiracial (NH)	4	11	57	0.27%	0.76%	3.87%
Hispanic or Latino (any race)	8	0	21	0.54%	0.00%	1.43%
Total	1,495	1,456	1,471	100.00%	100.00%	100.00%

=== 2020 census ===
As of the 2020 census, Rock Creek had a population of 1,471. The median age was 43.4 years. 21.0% of residents were under the age of 18 and 18.6% of residents were 65 years of age or older. For every 100 females, there were 94.8 males, and for every 100 females age 18 and over, there were 96.3 males age 18 and over.

0.0% of residents lived in urban areas, while 100.0% lived in rural areas.

There were 581 households in Rock Creek, of which 26.7% had children under the age of 18 living in them. Of all households, 58.5% were married-couple households, 17.2% were households with a male householder and no spouse or partner present, and 21.9% were households with a female householder and no spouse or partner present. About 20.3% of all households were made up of individuals and 10.4% had someone living alone who was 65 years of age or older.

There were 609 housing units, of which 4.6% were vacant. The homeowner vacancy rate was 0.8% and the rental vacancy rate was 3.7%.

=== 2010 census ===
As of the census of 2010, there were 1,456 people, 576 households, and 447 families living in the CDP. The population density was 490 inhabitants per square mile (190/km^{2}). There were 615 housing units at an average density of 205 per square mile (79/km^{2}). The racial makeup of the CDP was 97.5% White, 0.8% Black or African American, 0.7% Native American, 0.1% Asian, 0.0% from other races, and 0.8% from two or more races. 0.0% of the population were Hispanic or Latino of any race.

There were 576 households, out of which 27.8% had children under the age of 18 living with them, 63.0% were married couples living together, 9.9% had a female householder with no husband present, and 22.4% were non-families. 19.4% of all households were made up of individuals, and 7.7% had someone living alone who was 65 years of age or older. The average household size was 2.53 and the average family size was 2.90.

In the CDP, the population was spread out, with 20.5% under the age of 18, 7.5% from 18 to 24, 27.2% from 25 to 44, 28.8% from 45 to 64, and 16.0% who were 65 years of age or older. The median age was 41 years. For every 100 females, there were 93.6 males. For every 100 females age 18 and over, there were 97.2 males.

The median income for a household in the CDP was $43,370, and the median income for a family was $44,321. Males had a median income of $44,500 versus $38,244 for females. The per capita income for the CDP was $19,878. About 8.4% of families and 8.0% of the population were below the poverty line, including 8.0% of those under age 18 and 0% of those age 65 or over.

=== 2000 census ===
As of the census of 2000, there were 1,495 people, 569 households, and 458 families living in the CDP. The population density was 515.0 inhabitants per square mile (198.8/km^{2}). There were 592 housing units at an average density of 203.9 per square mile (78.7/km^{2}). The racial makeup of the CDP was 98.86% White, 0.27% Black or African American, 0.40% Native American, 0.07% Asian, 0.13% from other races, and 0.27% from two or more races. 0.54% of the population were Hispanic or Latino of any race.

There were 569 households, out of which 35.7% had children under the age of 18 living with them, 67.8% were married couples living together, 9.5% had a female householder with no husband present, and 19.5% were non-families. 17.9% of all households were made up of individuals, and 6.9% had someone living alone who was 65 years of age or older. The average household size was 2.63 and the average family size was 2.98.

In the CDP, the population was spread out, with 24.7% under the age of 18, 7.7% from 18 to 24, 29.9% from 25 to 44, 26.6% from 45 to 64, and 11.0% who were 65 years of age or older. The median age was 38 years. For every 100 females, there were 89.7 males. For every 100 females age 18 and over, there were 92.0 males.

The median income for a household in the CDP was $41,875, and the median income for a family was $49,375. Males had a median income of $35,294 versus $27,250 for females. The per capita income for the CDP was $33,333. About 6.2% of families and 3.8% of the population were below the poverty line, including none of those under age 18 and 7.9% of those age 65 or over.
