= Dunwoody, Georgia =

- City
- City of Dunwoody
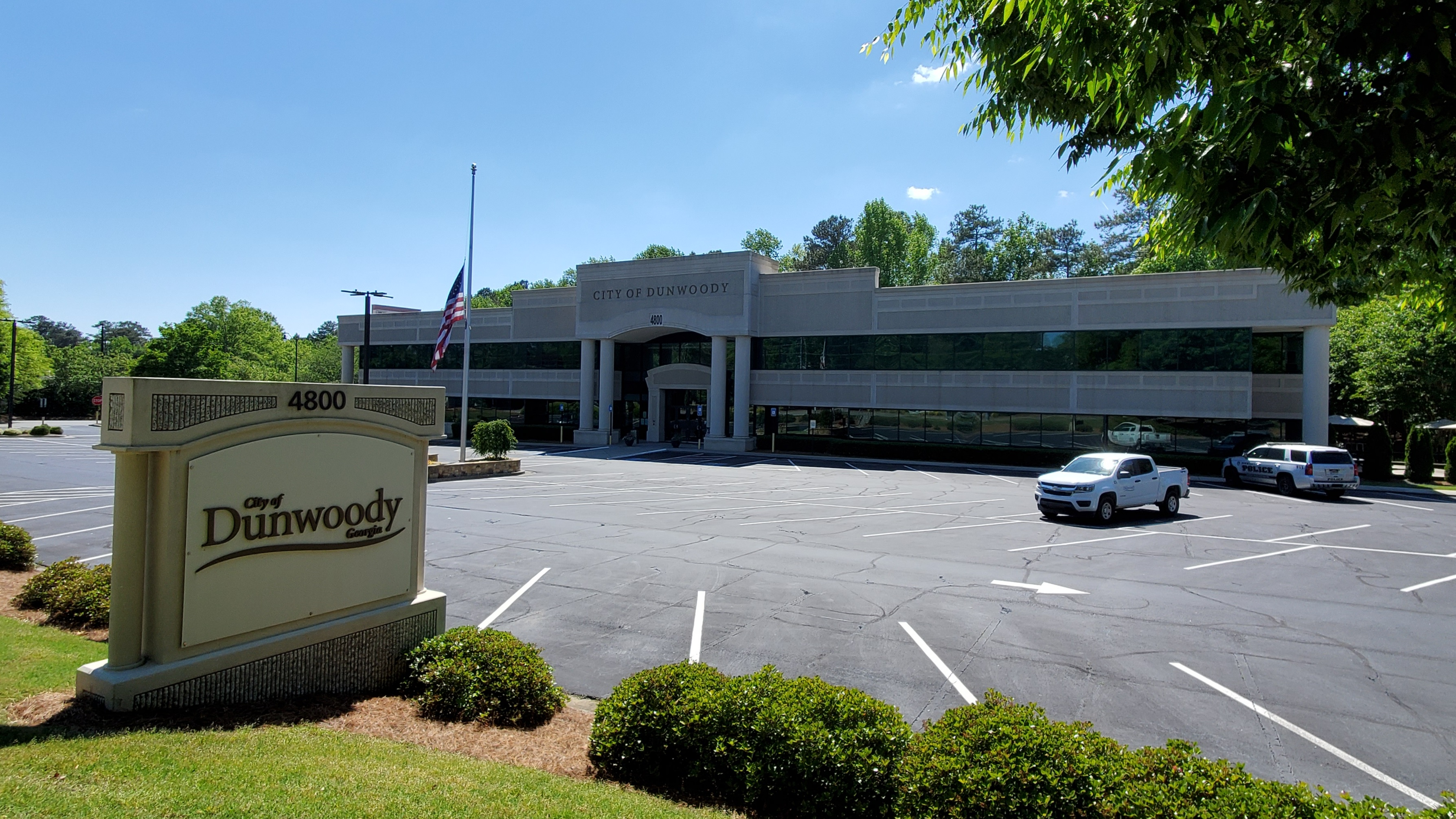
- City hall

- Seal Wordmark
- Interactive map of Dunwoody, Georgia
- Coordinates: 33°56′34″N 84°19′4″W
- Country: United States
- State: Georgia
- County: DeKalb
- Incorporated: December 1, 2008

Government
  - Type: Council–manager
  - Mayor: Lynn Deutsch
  - City Manager: Eric Linton

Area
  - Total: 13.25 sq mi (34.31 km^{2})
  - Land: 13.03 sq mi (33.74 km^{2})
  - Water: 0.22 sq mi (0.57 km^{2})
- Elevation: 1,129 ft (344 m)

Population (2020)
  - Total: 51,683
  - Density: 3,967.7/sq mi (1,531.93/km^{2})
- Time zone: UTC-5 (Eastern (EST))
  - Summer (DST): UTC-4 (EDT)
- ZIP Codes: 30338, 30346, 30360
- Area codes: 770, 678, 470
- FIPS code: 13-24768
- GNIS feature ID: 0325929
- Website: dunwoodyga.gov

Dunwoody is a city located in DeKalb County, Georgia, United States. As a northern suburb of Atlanta, Dunwoody is part of the Atlanta metropolitan area. It was incorporated as a city on December 1, 2008, but its area establishment dates back to the early 1830s. As of 2020, the city had a population of 51,683.

== History ==
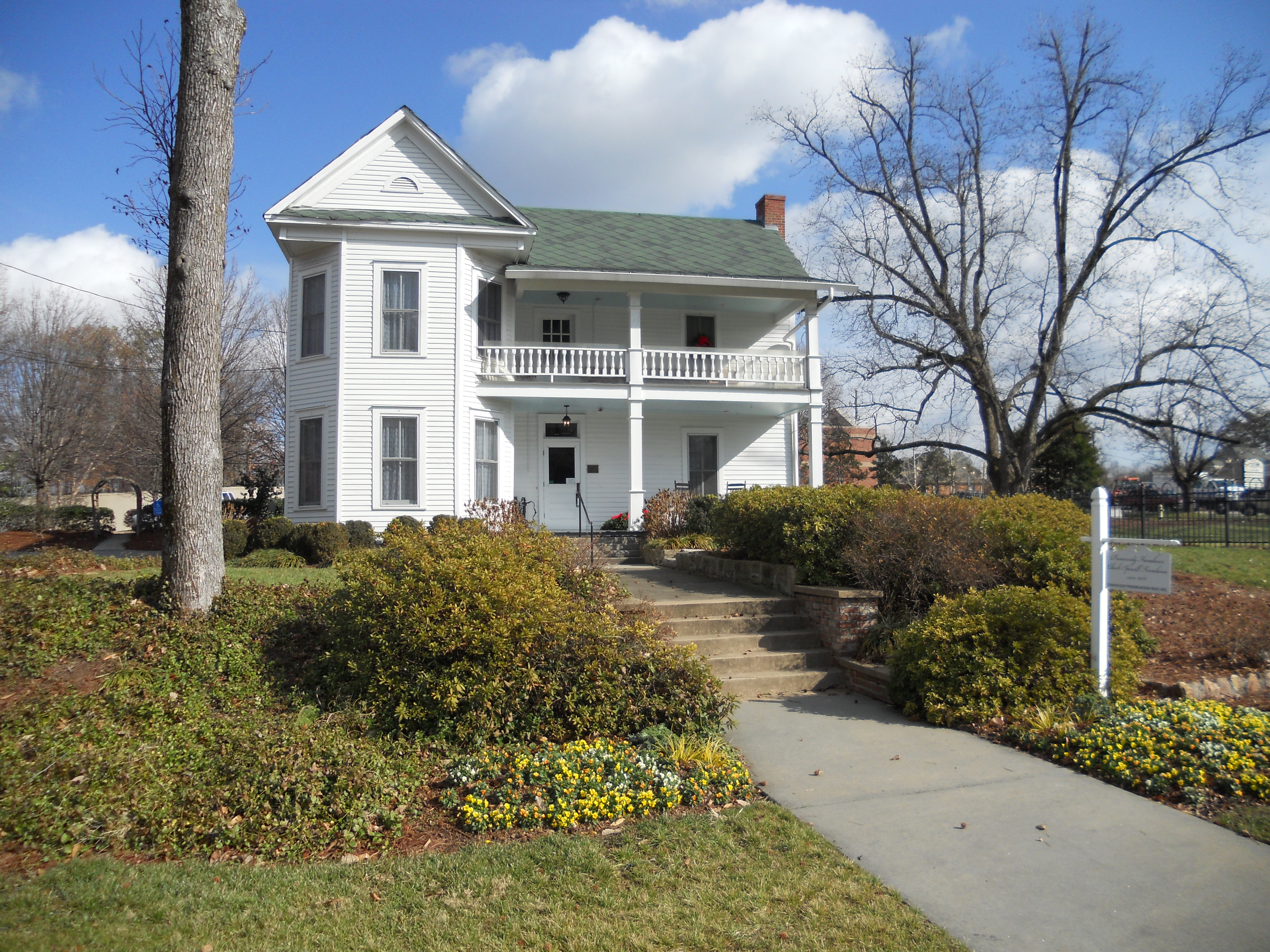
The Dunwoody Farmhouse, historic center of the community

The Dunwoody area was established in the early 1830s and is named for Major Charles Dunwody (1828–1905), an extra "o" added with the incorrect spelling of the name on a banking note. Charles Dunwody originally returned to Roswell after fighting in the Civil War, in which he fought for the Confederates.

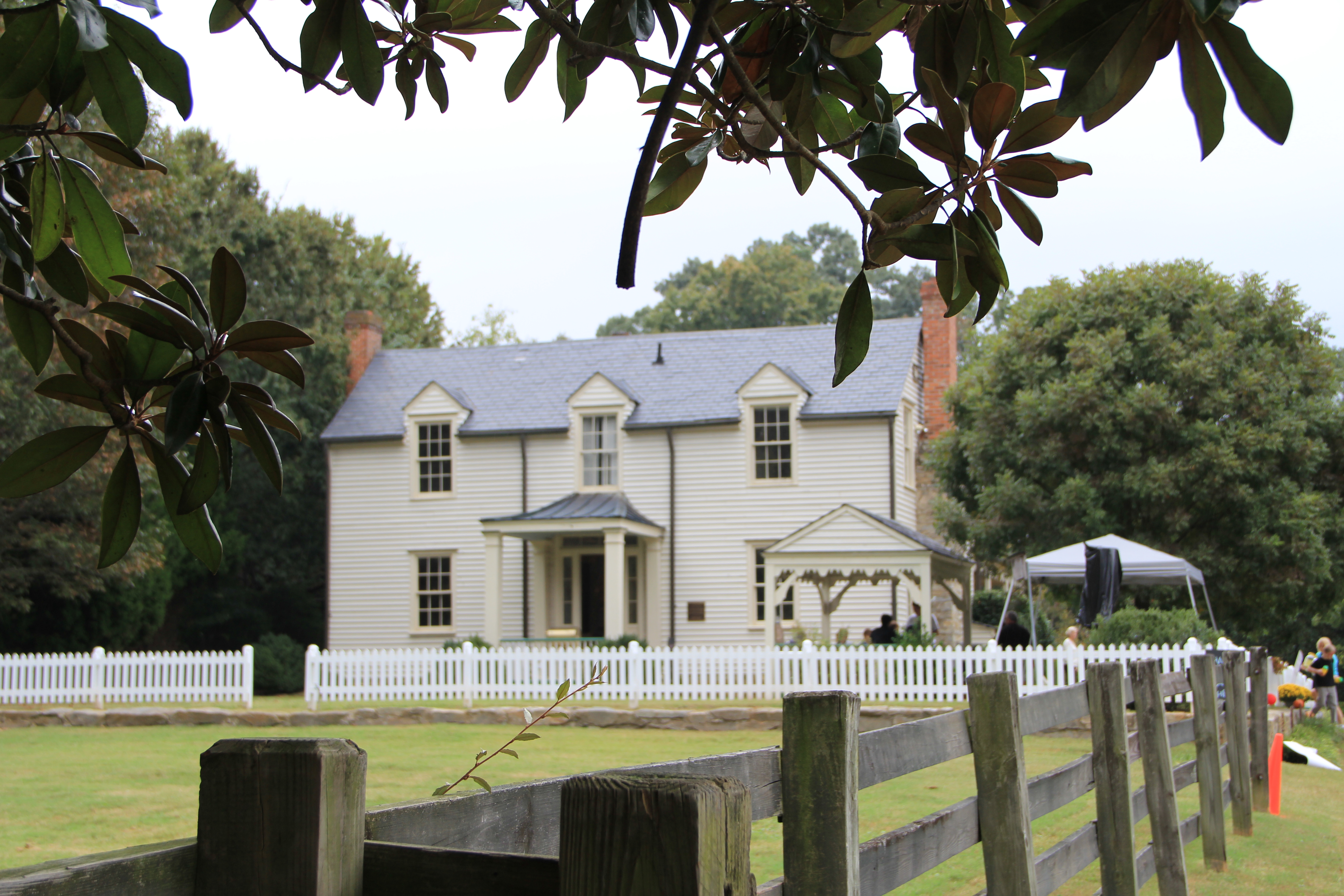
The Donaldson-Bannister House

One of Dunwoody's most historic buildings dates from 1829. The Ebenezer Primitive Baptist Church, at the corner of Roberts Drive and Spalding Drive, is still active to this date and is also the home to one of the city's oldest cemeteries, where many of the founding fathers of Dunwoody are buried. The first public school, Dunwoody Elementary, first stood near the center of the city at the intersection of Chamblee-Dunwoody Road and Mount Vernon Road. It was in continuous operation from 1911 to 1986. A fire destroyed the school's cafeteria in 1966, which was on the corner of Womack Road and Chamblee-Dunwoody Road. On that site today, the Dunwoody branch of the Dekalb County Public Library now operates along with the North Dekalb Cultural Arts Center. In 1881, the Roswell Railroad opened and ran along what is now Chamblee-Dunwoody Road north to the Chattahoochee River. It operated for 40 years, and in 1905, President Theodore Roosevelt made a campaign whistle stop in Dunwoody along the way to Roswell, Georgia.

On account of the railroad, Dunwoody developed into a small crossroads community. The community continued to grow and prosper even after the railroad shut down in 1921. Dunwoody remained rural until suburban residential development was initiated in the 1960s. In 1971, the Spruill family sold a large portion of their property for the construction of Perimeter Mall, with the completion of Dunwoody Village occurring the same year.

In early 2006, a study was conducted by the Carl Vinson Institute of Government of the University of Georgia, to determine how feasible it would be to incorporate Dunwoody as a city. Critics claimed that incorporation of Dunwoody, as in the incorporation of Sandy Springs in 2005, would take away a great deal of tax revenue from the rest of the county, leading to shortages of services, tax increases, or both for everyone else in the county, as has happened in Fulton. Citizens for Dunwoody, Inc. was the non-profit advocacy group begun by Senator Dan Weber to promote the effort.

The bill for incorporation was withdrawn from the Georgia General Assembly for further study in 2006 and passed only the lower house in 2007. In 2008, the bill of incorporation was re-introduced by Senator Weber, and due to increased pressure, it passed in the senate as well as the house. Georgia Governor Sonny Perdue signed the bill allowing the residents to vote for a city of Dunwoody on March 25. The referendum for cityhood, which took place on July 15, was approved by an overwhelming majority of voters. The Dunwoody City Charter was later ratified by the Georgia General Assembly, and on December 1, 2008, after a three-year movement, Dunwoody officially became a city.

== Geography ==
Dunwoody's geographic center is at 33°56′34″N 84°19′4″W (33.942751, -84.317694). According to the United States Census Bureau, Dunwoody has a total area of 13.2 square miles (34.1 km^{2}), of which 12.9 square miles (33.5 km^{2}) is land and 0.23 square miles (0.6 km^{2}), or 1.72%, is water. Dunwoody lies at the northern tip of DeKalb County, bounded by the Fulton County line on the north and west, Interstate 285 on the south, Peachtree Industrial Boulevard on the southeast, and the Gwinnett County line on the northeast.

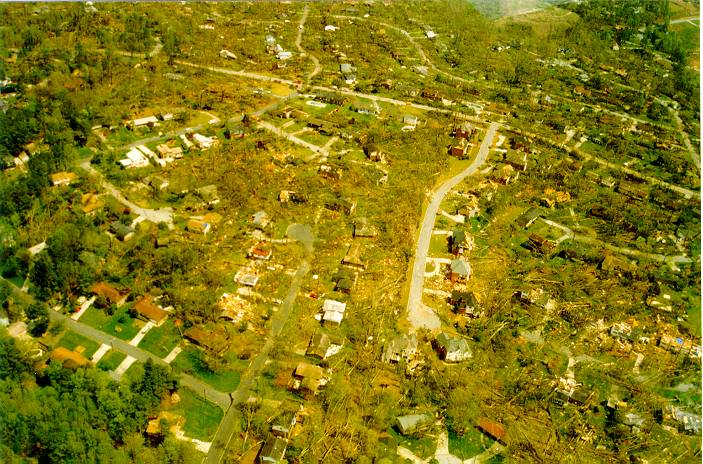
The 1998 tornado's path through a Dunwoody neighborhood

Late on April 8, 1998, a major tornado tore through parts of Dunwoody, running east-northeast from Perimeter Center and into Gwinnett County. Thousands of homes were damaged, hundreds seriously, and several dozen were condemned. In addition, tens of thousands of native forest trees were downed. The vast majority of the tornado's damage occurred here, leading it to be called the "Dunwoody tornado", the most vivid in local memory until the 2008 Atlanta tornado.

=== Districts and neighborhoods ===
Dunwoody Village is the historic heart of the community, and the location of the iconic Dunwoody Farmhouse. The distinctive Colonial Williamsburg architectural style of the district originated with the construction of Dunwoody Village Shopping Center in the 1970s, for which the district gets its name. Since then, all other construction in the area followed suit, giving Dunwoody a unique architectural identity and sense of place.

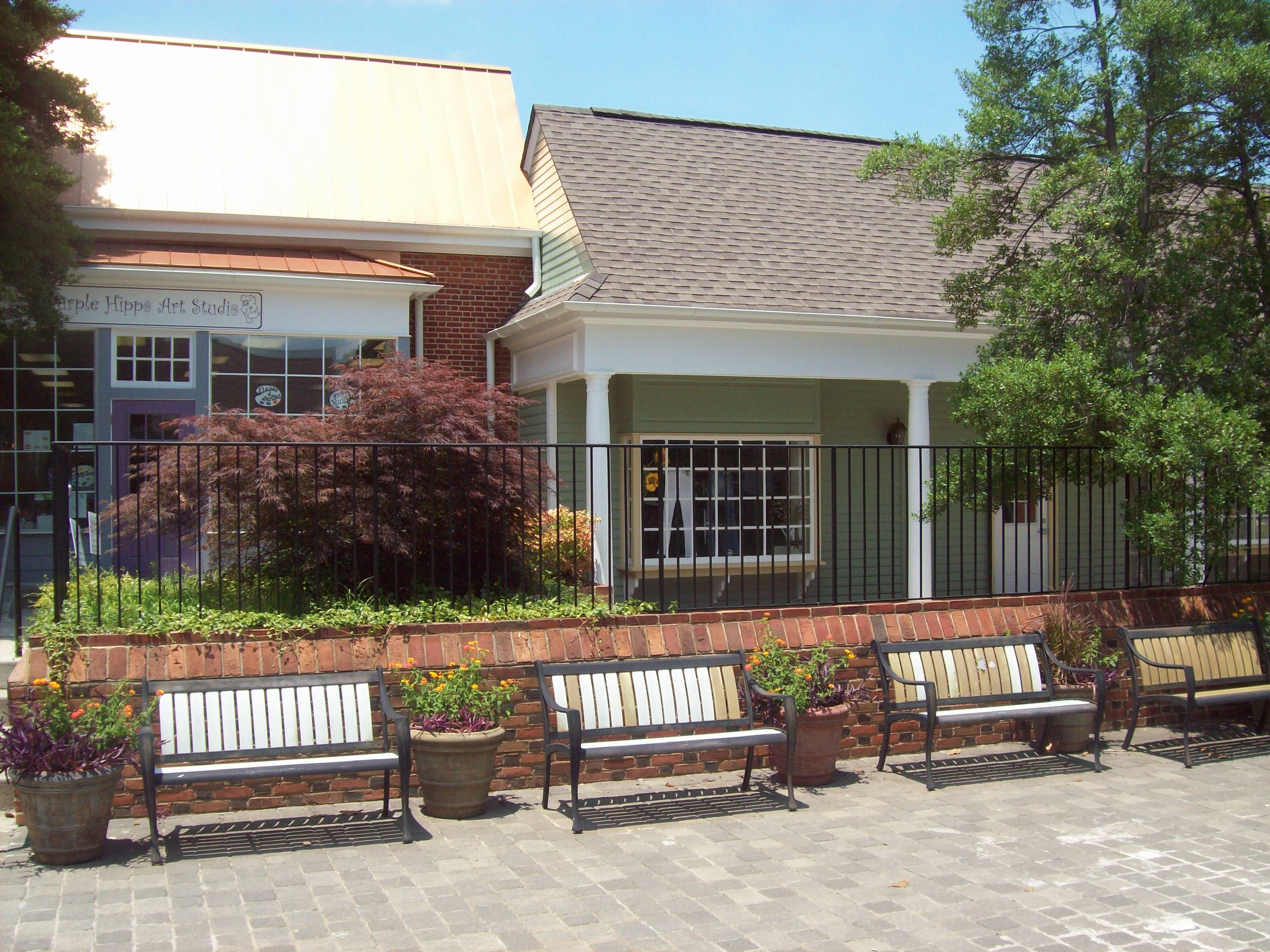
The courtyard of Dunwoody Village

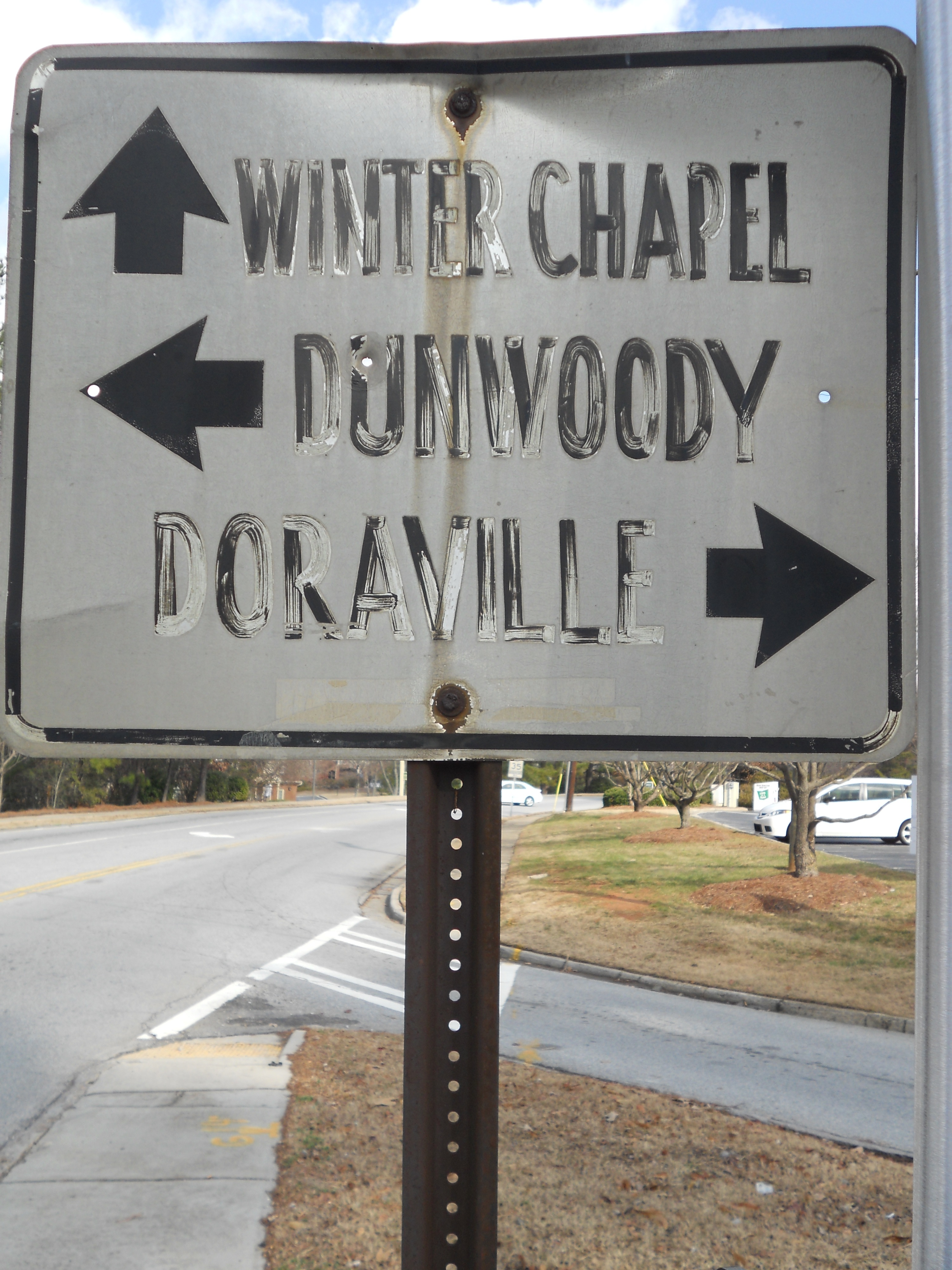
A Dunwoody directional sign indicating Dunwoody Village, Winters Chapel, and Doraville

Perimeter Center is the major edge city and neighborhood that has formed around Perimeter Mall. The mall was developed in 1971, spurring major office, residential, and commercial developments in the decades since. It is one of Metro Atlanta's largest job centers, employing hundreds of thousands of people each day. Perimeter Mall and approximately 40 percent of the Perimeter Community Improvement District, is a self-taxing district of shopping and office buildings (including several high-rises), are both located in Dunwoody. The western part of Perimeter Center edge city spans the Fulton county line into Sandy Springs. The tallest building in Dunwoody is the 34-story Ravinia 3, at 444 feet (135 m). Perimeter Center is located at the intersection of two major highways, GA 400 and I-285. The Dunwoody Transit Station provides public transit to the district.

Georgetown was developed in the early 1960s. It is located near I-285 and borders with the city limits of Chamblee. Overdevelopment in Georgetown was one of the main reasons for the initiation of Dunwoody's incorporation movement, with many new apartments being approved for the area, even in some single-family residential areas. Georgetown, one of the most walkable areas of the city, contains both single-family residential subdivisions and its own retail district. This includes Kroger, who also owns and manages the property.

The Williamsburg commercial district is located on the eastern edge of Dunwoody, adjacent to the Dunwoody Panhandle of Sandy Springs. Shopping areas include Orchard Park Shopping Center, Mt. Vernon Shopping Center and the Williamsburg at Dunwoody Shopping Center. The centralized dining and shopping covers the intersection of Mt. Vernon, Dunwoody Club Drive, and Jett Ferry Road.

Winters Chapel is located at Dunwoody's border with Peachtree Corners. The district shares a name with its main road, which travels through Fulton, Gwinnett and DeKalb County and was an important 19th century route connecting Decatur and Roswell via Holcomb Bridge Road. The district is named after Winters Chapel (now Winters Chapel Methodist Church), which has resided at its present location since the 1870s. The church itself is named after an instrumental founder, Jeremiah Winters. The area is a prime location for light commercial and retail redevelopment opportunities due to good demographics and traffic counts. Two parks, connected by sidewalks, dominate Winters Chapel. The 3/4 mile long, meticulously groomed, linear park running along DeKalb County's Twin Lakes water reservoir on Peeler Road is popular with walkers and joggers. Windwood Hollow Park, at Lakeside Drive and Peeler Road, offers tennis, a children's play area, a picnic pavilion, and a short trail.

Tilly Mill is named after the pioneer Tilly family, who owned a late 19th-century farm and mill on land bisected by Tilly Mill Road, which connects Dunwoody to Peachtree Industrial and Doraville. Landmarks in the area include the Dunwoody campus of Georgia State University's Perimeter College and Dunwoody's signature park, Brook Run. Brook Run, on North Peachtree Road near its intersection with Tilly Mill Road, boasts many wooded walking trails, a children's play area, a dog park, a Veterans Memorial, and a community garden. The 103-acre (0.42 km^{2}) site will see major improvements as Dunwoody plans for its future. Also in Tilly Mill is the Marcus Jewish Community Center, an Orthodox synagogue, and a significant portion of Dunwoody's Jewish population.

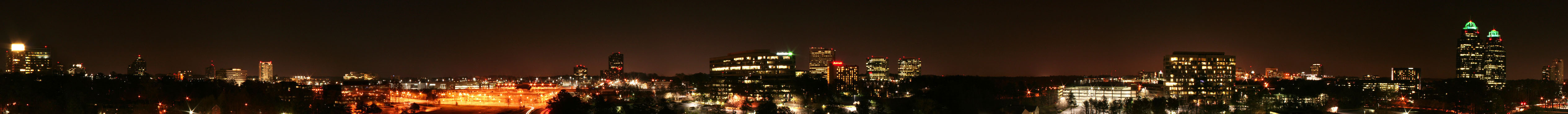
The Perimeter Center skyline including Dunwoody (center) and Sandy Springs (left and right)

== Demographics ==
Dunwoody, Georgia – Racial and ethnic composition Note: the US Census treats Hispanic/Latino as an ethnic category. This table excludes Latinos from the racial categories and assigns them to a separate category. Hispanics/Latinos may be of any race.
Race / Ethnicity (NH = Non-Hispanic)	Pop 2000	Pop 2010	Pop 2020	% 2000	% 2010	% 2020
White alone (NH)	26,833	29,667	27,824	81.79%	64.12%	53.84%
Black or African American alone (NH)	1,423	5,697	6,036	4.34%	12.31%	11.68%
Native American or Alaska Native alone (NH)	31	99	36	0.09%	0.21%	0.07%
Asian alone (NH)	2,536	5,139	8,839	7.73%	11.11%	17.10%
Native Hawaiian or Pacific Islander alone (NH)	3	16	17	0.01%	0.03%	0.03%
Other race alone (NH)	117	111	385	0.36%	0.24%	0.74%
Mixed race or Multiracial (NH)	351	783	1,936	1.07%	1.69%	3.75%
Hispanic or Latino (any race)	1,514	4,755	6,610	4.61%	10.28%	12.79%
Total	32,808	46,267	51,683	100.00%	100.00%	100.00%

Historical population
Census	Pop.	Note	%±
1980	17,768		—
1990	26,302		48.0%
2000	32,808		24.7%
2010	46,267		41.0%
2020	51,683		11.7%
2025 (est.)	51,792	▲	0.2%
U.S. Decennial Census; 2025

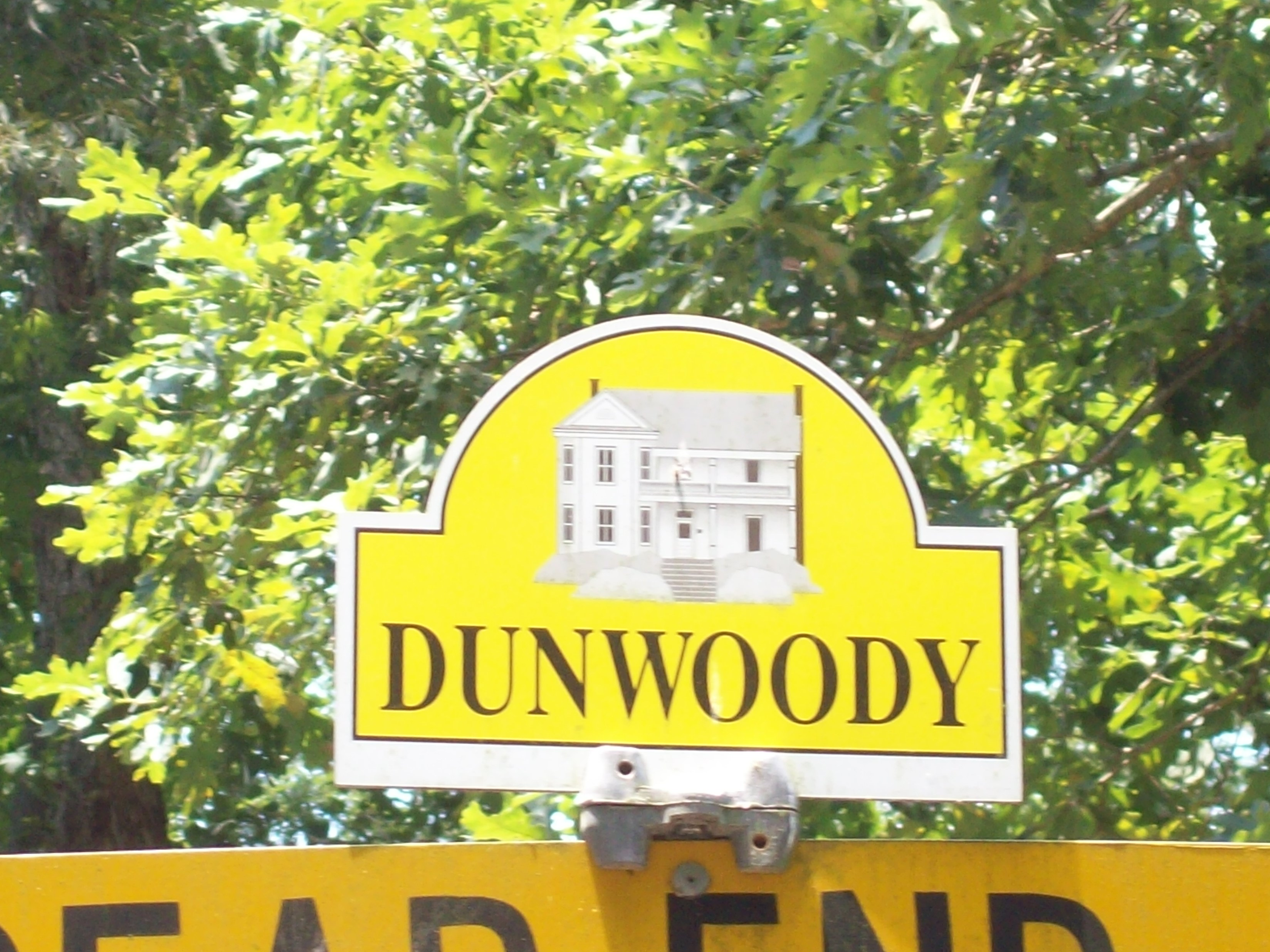
Dunwoody street-sign topper

=== 2020 census ===
As of the 2020 census, Dunwoody had a population of 51,683, 21,148 households, and 12,620 families. The median age was 36.3 years. 23.9% of residents were under the age of 18 and 13.5% of residents were 65 years of age or older. For every 100 females there were 93.4 males, and for every 100 females age 18 and over there were 91.2 males age 18 and over.

100.0% of residents lived in urban areas, while 0.0% lived in rural areas.

Of the city's 21,148 households, 33.6% had children under the age of 18 living in them. Of all households, 50.3% were married-couple households, 18.0% were households with a male householder and no spouse or partner present, and 26.9% were households with a female householder and no spouse or partner present. About 29.6% of all households were made up of individuals and 7.9% had someone living alone who was 65 years of age or older.

There were 22,514 housing units, of which 6.1% were vacant. The homeowner vacancy rate was 1.0% and the rental vacancy rate was 8.3%.

Racial composition as of the 2020 census
Race	Number	Percent
White	28,699	55.5%
Black or African American	6,165	11.9%
American Indian and Alaska Native	264	0.5%
Asian	8,863	17.1%
Native Hawaiian and Other Pacific Islander	22	0.0%
Some other race	3,332	6.4%
Two or more races	4,338	8.4%
Hispanic or Latino (of any race)	6,610	12.8%

== Government ==
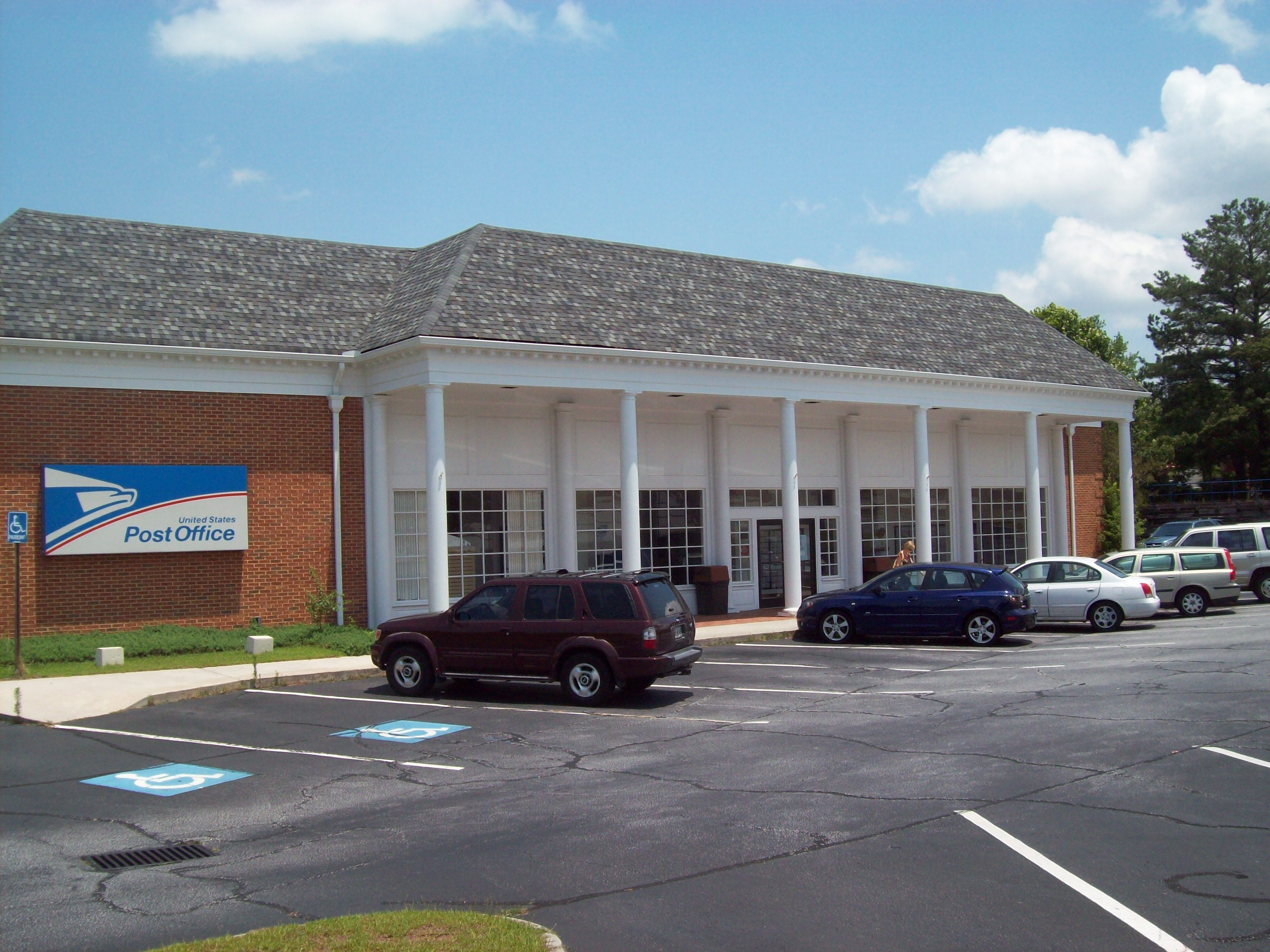
Dunwoody Post Office

The city has a council-manager form of municipal government. Its first mayor was Ken Wright. The current mayor is Lynn Deutsch, elected in November 2019. The city manager is Eric Linton.

Dunwoody's city hall is located at 4800 Ashford-Dunwoody Road from early 2018, after the property was purchased by the city in 2017. The city was renting a space in a Perimeter Center office building at 41 Perimeter Center East for several years prior. City Hall was originally at a temporary location in the city of Sandy Springs for most of the city's first year.

Dunwoody operates its own police force of 64 officers, as well as departments over zoning and land use. The city receives services from DeKalb County including: DeKalb County Schools, Dekalb County Fire & Rescue, sanitation, water, and sewage.

== Economy ==
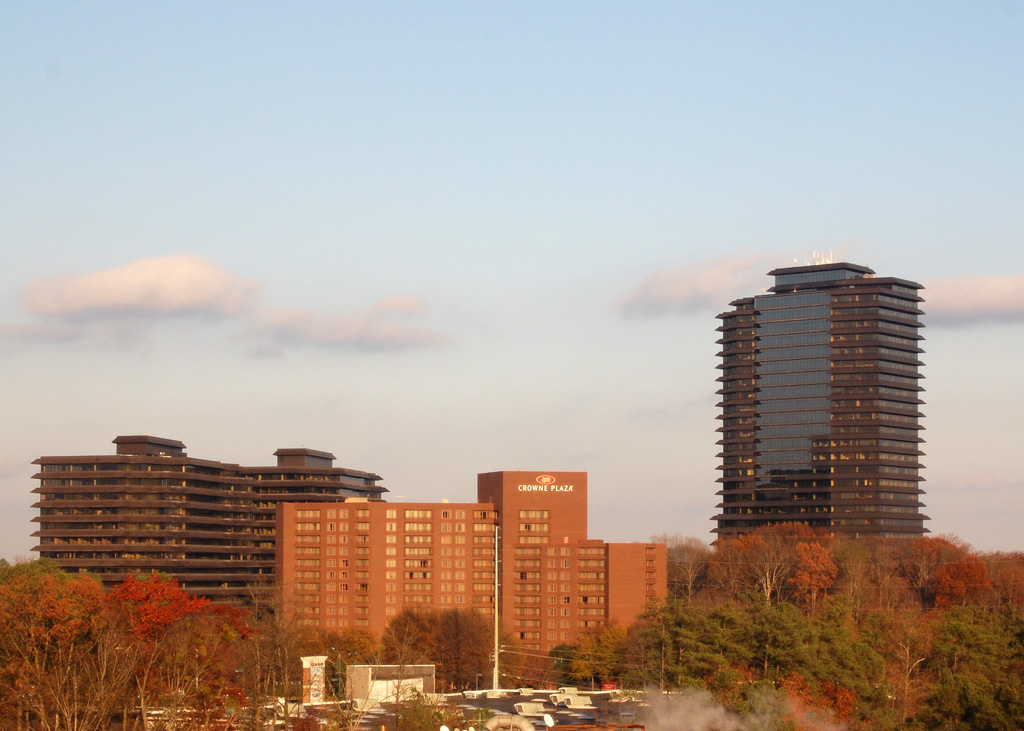
Three Ravinia Drive (far right) is the tallest building in Dunwoody.

The Atlanta Journal-Constitution had its headquarters in the Perimeter Center and in Dunwoody. In 2010 the newspaper relocated its headquarters from Downtown Atlanta to leased offices in the Perimeter Center for financial reasons. There are a number of other local media organizations serving the Dunwoody area which primarily provide local news: the Dunwoody Crier, Dunwoody Reporter, the Aha Connection, and a podcast What's Up Dunwoody.

InterContinental Hotels Group operates its American corporate offices in Dunwoody. The restaurant chain Krystal has its corporate headquarters in the city.

=== Top employers ===
According to the city's 2011 Comprehensive Annual Financial Report, the top employers in the city were:

#	Employer	# of Employees
1	InterContinental Hotels Group	1765
2	Dekalb County School District	772
3	Convergent Outsourcing	423
4	Peachford Hospital	410
5	T Mobile	396
6	Nordstrom	366
7	Southeastern Data	366
8	Maggiano's	322
9	Macy's	298
10	Walmart	298

== Education ==
=== Primary and secondary schools ===
The DeKalb County School System (DCSS) operates local public schools.

Elementary schools operated by DCSS in Dunwoody include:

- Austin Elementary School

- Chesnut Charter Elementary School
- Kingsley Elementary School
- Vanderlyn Elementary School
- Dunwoody Elementary School
- Hightower Elementary School (serves Doraville, feeds into Peachtree Middle and Dunwoody High)

Middle and high schools operated by DCSS in Dunwoody include:

- Peachtree Charter Middle School
- Dunwoody High School

=== Private schools ===
Dunwoody Christian School

=== Colleges and universities ===
- Georgia State University, Dunwoody Campus (formerly Georgia Perimeter College and previous to that, DeKalb Community College North Campus)
- American InterContinental University (AIU Dunwoody), just across the county line in neighboring Sandy Springs
- Troy University, Atlanta site

=== Public libraries ===
DeKalb County Public Library operates the Dunwoody Branch.

== Transportation ==
=== Highways ===
- Interstate 285, also called The Perimeter, runs along the city's southern border.
- A limited access portion of Georgia State Route 141 runs along the southeastern border.
- Georgia State Route 400, while in neighboring Sandy Springs, is very close to the city's western border.

=== Mass transit ===
The Metropolitan Atlanta Rapid Transit Authority (MARTA) provides subway and bus service to Dunwoody and the surrounding area.

MARTA subway stations in Dunwoody are concentrated in the western part of the city. The Dunwoody station is the only station within the city limits, although Medical Center, Sandy Springs station, and North Springs station are very close to the western border. All stations in the area are served exclusively by the Red Line.

While some routes serve the outskirts of the city, there are three main bus routes, one of which leaves from the Dunwoody Station (Route 150).

- Route 103 - Peeler Rd./N. Shallowford Rd.
- Route 132 - Tilly Mill Road
- Route 150 - Perimeter Center/Dunwoody Village

=== Pedestrians and cycling ===
- Dunwoody Trailway
- Georgetown Gateway (Proposed)
- Perimeter Multi-Modal Trails (Proposed)
- PATH400 (Under construction)
- Winters Chapel Corridor Multiuse Trail (Proposed)

== Notable people ==
- Ryan Seacrest, host of American Idol, Wheel of Fortune
- Erin Andrews, ESPN reporter, lived in Dunwoody while working for Fox Sports South
- Bret Baier, Host of Special Report with Bret Baier
- Harris Barton (born 1964), former professional football player, San Francisco 49ers
- Black Lips, "flower punk" band
- Alex Caskey (born 1988), soccer player
- Emily Jacobson (born 1985), saber fencer
- Sada Jacobson (born 1983), Olympic fencing silver and bronze medalist
- Charles London (born 1975), quarterbacks coach for the Atlanta Falcons
- Robert Duncan McNeill, director and actor, known for Star Trek: Voyager
- Robin Meade, anchor CNN Headline News
- Fran Millar, former Georgia politician 1998–2018
- Kip Pardue, actor
- Pat Swindall, U.S. representative for Georgia
- Corey White, former NFL cornerback
- Jeff Williams, poker player
- Cindy Wilson, singer, songwriter and a founding member of new wave rock band The B-52s, lives in Dunwoody
- Sally Yates, former U.S. Attorney General

== Parks ==
- Brook Run Skate Park
- Donaldson-Bannister Farm
